= List of Wisconsin railroads =

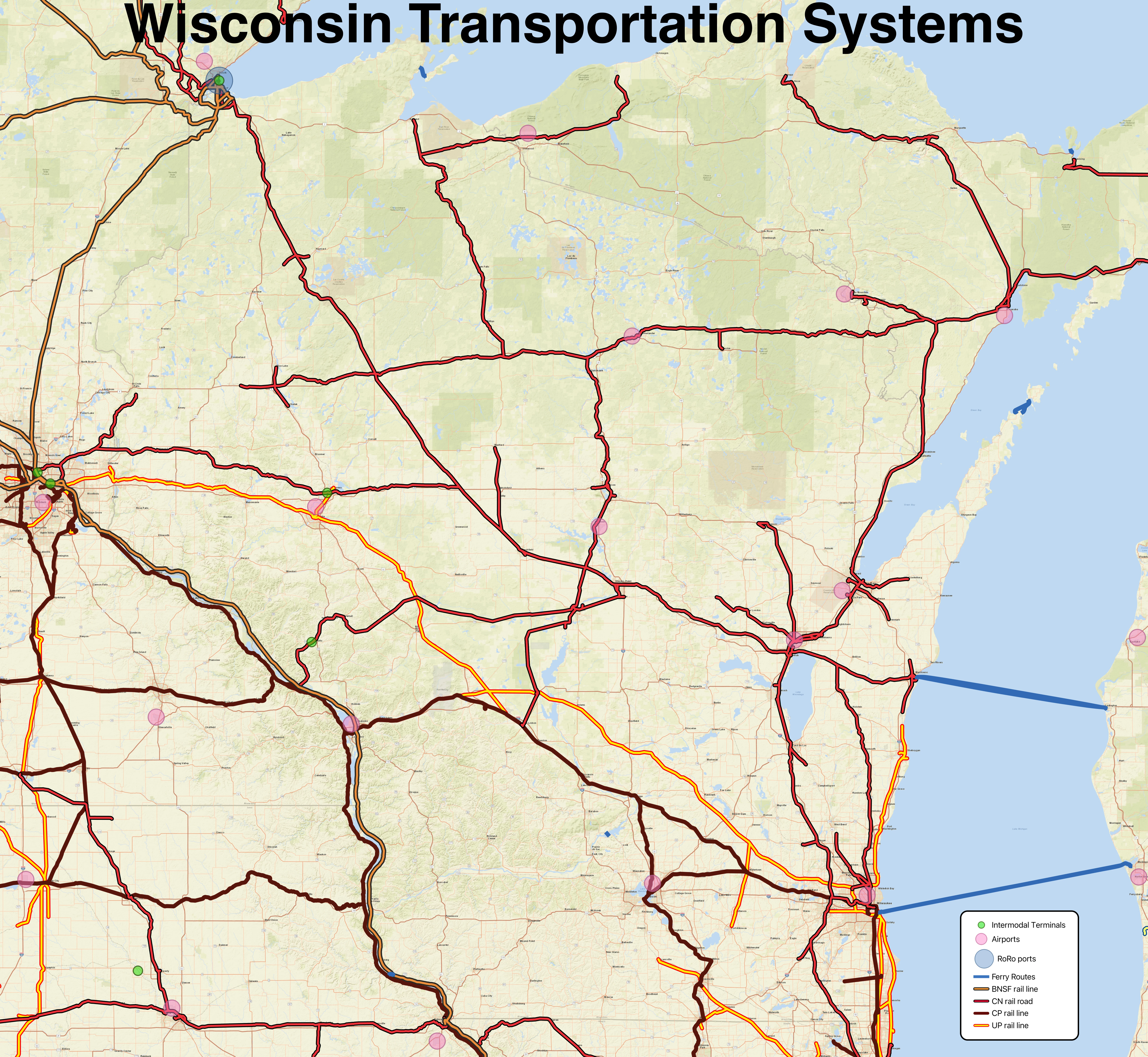
Wisconsin class 1 railroads

The following railroads operate in the U.S. state of Wisconsin.

== Current railroads ==
=== Common freight carriers ===
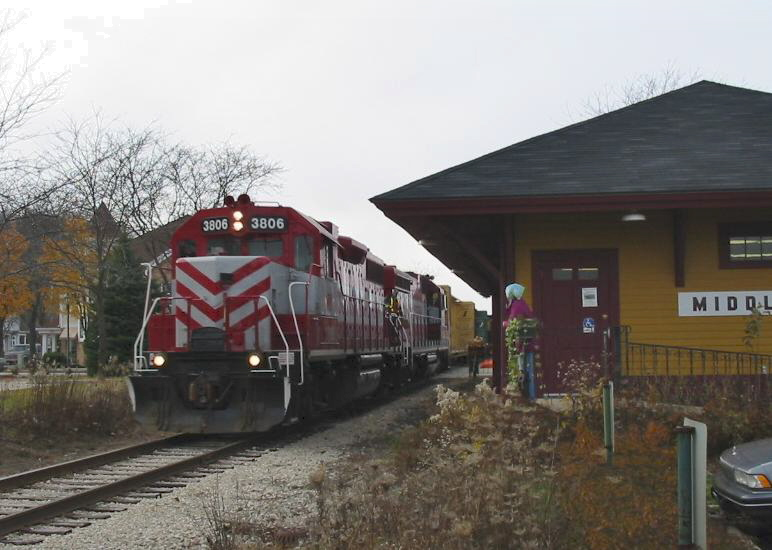
A Wisconsin and Southern Railroad train passes the Middleton depot eastbound toward Madison

- BNSF Railway (BNSF)
- Canadian National Railway (CN) through subsidiaries Duluth, Missabe and Iron Range Railway (DMIR), Duluth, Winnipeg and Pacific Railway (DWP), Sault Ste. Marie Bridge Company (SSAM), and Wisconsin Central Ltd. (WC)
- CPKC Railway (CPKC) through subsidiaries Dakota, Minnesota and Eastern Railroad (DME) and Soo Line Railroad (SOO)
- Escanaba and Lake Superior Railroad (ELS)
- Fox Valley & Lake Superior Rail System (FOXY)
- Progressive Rail, Inc. (PGR)
- Tomahawk Railway (TR)
- Union Pacific Railroad (UP)
- Wisconsin and Southern Railroad (WSOR)
- Wisconsin Great Northern Railroad (WGNS)
- Wisconsin Northern Railroad (WN)

=== Passenger carriers ===
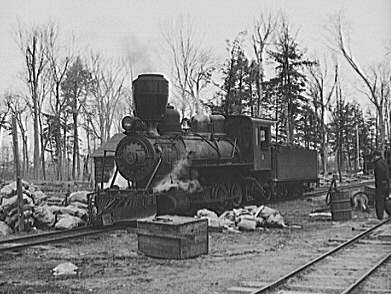
The Lumberjack Steam Train on the Laona and Northern Railway, circa 1937

- Amtrak (AMTK)
- East Troy Electric Railroad (METW)
- Kenosha Streetcar (KAT)
- Laona and Northern Railway (LNO)
- Metra (METX)
- Mid-Continent Railway Museum (MCRY)
- Osceola and St. Croix Valley Railway (MNTX)
- The Hop
- Wisconsin Great Northern Railroad (WGNS)

=== Industrial/private carriers ===
- Cando Rail Services (CRSX)
- Cenex Harvest States
- Port of Milwaukee
- Rail & Transload, Inc.
- Badger Mining Corporation (BMC)
- US Army (USAX)
- Wisconsin Public Service Corporation (WPSX)

=== Proposed ===
- Great Lakes Basin Railroad

== Defunct railroads ==
Name	Mark	System (Note: This is one or more of the Class I railroads that the railroad became part of, if any.)	From	To	Successor	Notes
Abbotsford and Northeastern Railroad	A&NE	CP	1889	1910	Wisconsin Central Railway	
Ahnapee and Western Railway	AW, AHW	GB&W	1890	1993	Fox Valley and Western Ltd.	
Alexander-Edgar Railroad	AEL		1899	1906		
Allouez Bay Dock Company		GN	1903	1913	Great Northern Railway	
Appleton and New London Railway		CNW	1866	1875	Milwaukee, Lake Shore and Western Railroad, Milwaukee, Lake Shore and Western Railway	
Ashland Railway		CNW	1882	1885	Chicago, St. Paul, Minneapolis and Omaha Railway	
Ashland, Odanah and Marengo Railway	AO&M		1902	1921	N/A	
Baraboo Air Line Railroad		CNW	1870	1871	Chicago and North Western Railway	
Bayfield Harbor and Great Western Railroad						
Bayfield, Superior and Minneapolis Railway						
Bayfield Transfer Railway			1883	1933	N/A	
Bayfield Western Railroad			1898			
Beaver Dam and Baraboo Railroad		MILW	1855	1856	Madison, Fond du Lac and Michigan Railroad	
Beloit and Madison Railroad		CNW	1852	1871	Chicago and North Western Railway	
Beloit and Taycheedah Railroad		CNW	1848	1850	Rock River Valley Union Railroad	
Big Falls Railway						
Black River Railroad		CNW	1878	1880	Chicago, St. Paul, Minneapolis and Omaha Railway	
Burlington Northern Inc.	BN		1970	1981	Burlington Northern Railroad	
Burlington Northern Railroad	BN		1981	1996	Burlington Northern and Santa Fe Railway	
Calumet and Blue Island Railway			1896	1897	Chicago, Lake Shore and Eastern Railway	
Cazenovia and Sauk City Railroad			1909	1913	Cazenovia Southern Railroad	
Cazenovia Southern Railroad			1913	1937	N/A	
Cedar Falls and Northern Railway		CNW	1881	1883	Menomonie Railway	
Central Wisconsin Railroad			1920	1926	Fairchild and Northeastern Railroad	
Central Wisconsin Railroad	CWRC		1980	1985	Wisconsin and Calumet Railroad	
Chicago, Burlington and Northern Railroad		CB&Q	1885	1899	Chicago, Burlington and Quincy Railroad	
Chicago, Burlington and Quincy Railroad	CB&Q	CB&Q	1899	1970	Burlington Northern Inc.	
Chicago, Burlington and Quincy Railway		CB&Q	1901	1907	N/A	Leased the Chicago, Burlington and Quincy Railroad
Chicago, Fairchild & Eau Claire Railroad	CF&EC		1882	1897	Fairchild and Northeastern Railroad	
Chicago, Lake Shore and Eastern Railway			1897	1909	Elgin, Joliet and Eastern Railway	
Chicago and Lake Superior Railway			1897			
Chicago, Madison and Northern Railroad			1980	1982	Central Wisconsin Railroad	
Chicago, Madison and Northern Railroad		IC	1886	1903	Illinois Central Railroad	
Chicago and Milwaukee Railway		CNW	1863	1881	Chicago, Milwaukee and North Western Railway	
Chicago, Milwaukee and North Western Railway		CNW	1881	1883	Chicago and North Western Railway	
Chicago, Milwaukee and St. Paul Railway		MILW	1874	1928	Chicago, Milwaukee, St. Paul and Pacific Railroad	
Chicago, Milwaukee, St. Paul and Pacific Railroad	MILW	MILW	1928	1985	The Milwaukee Road, Inc.	
Chicago and North Western Railway	CNW	CNW	1859	1972	Chicago and North Western Transportation Company	
Chicago and North Western Transportation Company	CNW	CNW	1972	1995	Union Pacific Railroad	
Chicago, St. Paul and Fond du Lac Railroad		CNW	1855	1859	Chicago and North Western Railway	
Chicago, St. Paul and Minneapolis Railway		CNW	1878	1880	Chicago, St. Paul, Minneapolis and Omaha Railway	
Chicago, St. Paul, Minneapolis and Omaha Railway	CMO	CNW	1880	1972	Chicago and North Western Transportation Company	
Chicago and Superior Railroad		MILW	1873	1880	Chicago, Milwaukee and St. Paul Railway	
Chicago and Tomah Railroad		CNW	1872	1880	Milwaukee and Madison Railway	
Chicago, Wisconsin and Minnesota Railroad		CP	1885	1899	Wisconsin Central Railway	
Chicago, Wisconsin and Northern Railroad		CP	1884	1888	Chicago, Wisconsin and Minnesota Railroad	
Chippewa Falls and Northern Railway		CNW	1881	1883	Chicago, St. Paul, Minneapolis and Omaha Railway	
Chippewa Falls and Western Railway		CP	1873	1888	Minnesota, St. Croix and Wisconsin Railroad	
Chippewa River Railroad	CVSR					
Chippewa River and Menomonie Railway			1883	1902	Chippewa River and Northern Railway	
Chippewa River and Northern Railway			1902			
Chippewa Valley and Northern Railway			1900			
Chippewa Valley and Northwestern Railway		CNW	1901	1904	Chicago, St. Paul, Minneapolis and Omaha Railway	
Chippewa Valley and Superior Railway		MILW	1881	1882	Chicago, Milwaukee and St. Paul Railway	
Connor-Flanner Railroad			1927	1932	N/A	
Cuyuna Dock Company		NP	1912	1915	Northern Pacific Railway	
Dells and Northeastern Railway			1936	1947	N/A	
Dixon, Rockford and Kenosha Railway		CNW	1864	1864	Chicago and North Western Railway	
Drummond and Southwestern Railway	D&SW		1895	1912		
Dubuque, Platteville and Milwaukee Railroad		MILW	1867	1880	Mineral Point Railroad	
Duluth, Missabe and Northern Railway	DM&N		1915	1937	Duluth, Missabe and Iron Range Railway	
Duluth Short Line Railway		NP	1886	1898	St. Paul and Duluth Railroad	
Duluth, South Shore and Atlantic Railroad		CP	1949	1961	Soo Line Railroad	
Duluth, South Shore and Atlantic Railway	DS&A, DSS&A, DSA	CP	1887	1949	Duluth, South Shore and Atlantic Railroad	
Duluth and Superior Bridge Company			1894			
Duluth, Superior and Michigan Railway		CP	1886	1887	Duluth, South Shore and Atlantic Railway	
Duluth, Superior and Western Terminal Company		GN	1897	1908	Allouez Bay Dock Company, Great Northern Railway	
Duluth and Winnipeg Terminal Company		GN	1892	1897	Duluth, Superior and Western Terminal Company	
Dunbar and Wausaukee Railway	D&W		1892	1918	Wisconsin & Northwestern Railroad	
Eastern Railway of Minnesota		GN	1888	1907	Great Northern Railway	
Eastern LaFayette and Mississippi Railway		MILW	1871	1880	Chicago, Milwaukee and St. Paul Railway	
Eau Claire Railway		CNW	1879	1893	Chicago, St. Paul, Minneapolis and Omaha Railway	
Eau Claire and Chippewa Falls Railway		CNW	1881	1883	Chicago, St. Paul, Minneapolis and Omaha Railway	
Eau Claire, Chippewa Falls and Northeastern Railway		CNW	1902	1904	Chicago, St. Paul, Minneapolis and Omaha Railway	
Elgin, Joliet and Eastern Railway			1909	1913	N/A	Leased the Milwaukee, Bay View and Chicago Railroad
Elgin and State Line Railroad		CNW	1880	1883	Chicago and North Western Railway	
Elkhorn and Walworth Railroad			1982	1985	Wisconsin and Calumet Railroad	
Ettrick Railroad			1929	1937	N/A	
Ettrick and Northern Railroad			1915	1929	Ettrick Railroad	
Fairchild and Mississippi River Railway		CNW	1886	1887	Sault Ste. Marie and Southwestern Railway	
Fairchild and North-Eastern Railway	F&NE		1898	1920	Central Wisconsin Railroad	
Fairchild and Northeastern Railroad	F&NE		1926	1929	N/A	
Fond du Lac, Amboy and Peoria Railway		MILW	1875	1883	Chicago, Milwaukee and St. Paul Railway	
Fond du Lac and Whitewater Railway		MILW	1874	1875	Fond du Lac, Amboy and Peoria Railway	
Fox Lake Railroad		MILW	1859	1904	Chicago, Milwaukee and St. Paul Railway	
Fox Lake and Wisconsin River Railroad		MILW	1857	1859	Fox Lake Railroad	
Fox River Valley Railroad	FRVR		1988	1993	Fox Valley and Western Ltd.	
Fox Valley and Western Ltd.	FVW		1993	2002	Wisconsin Central Ltd.	
Freeport, Dodgeville and Northern Railroad		IC	1887	1888	Chicago, Madison and Northern Railroad	
Galena and Southern Wisconsin Railroad		CNW	1857	1879	Galena and Wisconsin Railroad	
Galena and Wisconsin Railroad		CNW	1879	1880	Chicago and Tomah Railroad	
Galesville and Mississippi River Railroad		CNW	1882	1883	Chicago and North Western Railway	
Glenwood and Northern Railway			1902			
Glidden & Northeastern Railroad			1919	1927	N/A	
Glidden & Southwestern Railroad			1909	1919	N/A	
Goodyear, Neillsville & Northern Railroad			1889	1895	N/A	
Great Northern Railway	GN	GN	1902	1970	Burlington Northern Inc.	
Green Bay and Minnesota Railroad (I)			1851	1866	Green Bay and Lake Pepin Railway	Paper railroad. Never built due to lack of funds. Charter succeeded by GB&LP RR.
Green Bay and Lake Pepin Railway		GB&W	1866	1873	Green Bay and Minnesota Railroad	
Green Bay, Milwaukee and Chicago Railroad		CNW	1851	1857	Milwaukee and Chicago Railroad	
Green Bay and Minnesota Railroad (II)		GB&W	1873	1881	Green Bay, Winona and St. Paul Railroad	
Green Bay, Oshkosh, Madison and Southwestern Railroad		CP	1903	1906	Wisconsin and Northern Railroad	
Green Bay, Stevens Point and Northern Railroad		GB&W	1881	1896	Green Bay and Western Railroad	
Green Bay and Western Railroad	GB&W, GBW	GB&W	1896	1993	Fox Valley and Western Ltd.	
Green Bay, Winona and St. Paul Railroad		GB&W	1881	1896	Green Bay and Western Railroad	
Hawthorne, Nebagamon and Superior Railway	HN&S		1898	1907	N/A	
Hazelhurst and Southeastern Railway			1896			
Hiles & Eastern Railroad			1905	1906		
Hillsboro and Northeastern Railway	HLNE		1901	1985	Chicago and North Western Railway	
Hudson and River Falls Railway		CNW	1878	1880	North Wisconsin Railway	
Illinois Central Railroad	IC	IC	1888	1972	Illinois Central Gulf Railroad	
Illinois Central Gulf Railroad	ICG		1972	1980	Chicago, Madison and Northern Railroad	
I&M Rail Link	IMRL		1997	2002	Iowa, Chicago and Eastern Railroad	
Interstate Transfer Railway			1907	1938	Duluth, Missabe and Iron Range Railway	
Iola and Northern Railroad		GB&W	1893	1914	Green Bay and Western Railroad	
Iowa, Chicago and Eastern Railroad	ICE		2002	2008	Dakota, Minnesota and Eastern Railroad	
Iron Ridge and Mayville Railroad		MILW	1865	1878	Fond du Lac, Amboy and Peoria Railway	
Janesville, Beloit and Rockford Railway		MILW	1880	1882	Chicago, Milwaukee and St. Paul Railway	
Janesville and Evansville Railway		CNW	1886	1887	Chicago and North Western Railway	
Janesville and Southeastern Railway		MILW	1900	1901	Chicago, Milwaukee and St. Paul Railway	
Kenosha and Beloit Railroad		CNW	1853	1857	Kenosha and Rockford Railroad	
Kenosha and Rockford Railroad		CNW	1857	1857	Kenosha, Rockford and Rock Island Railroad	
Kenosha, Rockford and Rock Island Railroad		CNW	1864	1864	Dixon, Rockford and Kenosha Railway	
Kenosha, Rockford and Rock Island Railroad		CNW	1857	1857	Kenosha and State Line Railroad	
Kenosha and State Line Railroad		CNW	1857	1864	Kenosha, Rockford and Rock Island Railroad	
Kettle Moraine Scenic Railway	KMRY	MILW	1971	2001	N/A	
Kewaunee, Green Bay and Western Railroad	KGB	GB&W	1890	1969	Green Bay and Western Railroad	
Kickapoo Valley and Northern Railway		MILW	1889	1899	Wisconsin Western Railroad	
La Crosse and Milwaukee Railroad		MILW	1852	1867	Milwaukee and St. Paul Railway	
La Crosse and Onalaska Short Line Railroad		MILW	1888	1903	Chicago, Milwaukee and St. Paul Railway	
La Crosse and Southeastern Railway		MILW	1904	1933	Chicago, Milwaukee, St. Paul and Pacific Railroad	
La Crosse, Trempealeau and Prescott Railroad		CNW	1857	1877	Chicago and North Western Railway	
Lake Geneva and State Line Railway		CNW	1887	1889	Chicago and North Western Railway	
Lake Superior and Southeastern Railway		CP	1904	1908	Wisconsin Central Railway	
Lake Superior and South Western Railway		GN	1885	1888	Eastern Railway of Minnesota	
Lake Superior Terminal and Transfer Railway	LSTT	CNW/ CP/ GN/ NP	1884	1987	Burlington Northern Railroad	
Laona and Northern Railway	LNO		1902	1983	Nicolet Badger Northern Railroad	
Lisbon, Necedah and Lake Superior Railway		MILW	1889	1891	Chicago, Milwaukee and St. Paul Railway	
Lone Rock – La Valle Railroad			1904	1907	Cazenovia and Sauk City Railroad	
Madison and Beloit Railroad		CNW	1848	1850	Rock River Valley Union Railroad	
Madison, Fond du Lac and Michigan Railroad		MILW	1855	1858	Milwaukee, Watertown and Baraboo Valley Railroad	
Madison, Lodi and Baraboo Railroad		CNW	1864	1870	Baraboo Air Line Railroad	
Madison and Portage Railroad		MILW	1870	1873	Chicago and Superior Railroad	
Madison and Prairie du Chien Railroad		MILW	1852	1853	Milwaukee and Mississippi Railroad	
Manitowoc, Green Bay and North-Western Railway		CNW	1904	1909	Chicago and North Western Railway	
Manitowoc and Mississippi Railroad		CP	1851	1868	Manitowoc and Minnesota Railroad	
Manitowoc and Minnesota Railroad		CP	1868	1871	Wisconsin Central Railroad	
Manitowoc and Western Railroad		CP	1895	1895	Milwaukee and Lake Winnebago Railroad	
Manville & Eau Pleine River Railroad		WC	1881	1908	N/A	
Marathon County Railway			1903	1928	N/A	
Marinette, Tomahawk and Western Railroad	MTW		1912	1992	Tomahawk Railway	
Marinette, Tomahawk and Western Railway			1894	1912	Marinette, Tomahawk and Western Railroad	
Markesan and Brandon Railway		MILW	1882	1903	Chicago, Milwaukee and St. Paul Railway	
Marshfield and Southeastern Railroad		CP	1896	1901	Wisconsin Central Railway	
Mattoon Railway			1895			
Mazomanie, Sauk City and Prairie du Sac Railroad		MILW	1880	1886	Chicago, Milwaukee and St. Paul Railway	
Menasha and Appleton Railway		MILW	1879	1880	Milwaukee and Northern Railroad	
Menominee Railway		CNW	1879	1880	Menominee River Railroad	
Menominee River Railroad		CNW	1880	1882	Chicago and North Western Railway	
Menomonie Railway		CNW	1879	1893	Chicago, St. Paul, Minneapolis and Omaha Railway	
Milwaukee, Bay View and Chicago Railroad			1889	1913	Illinois Steel Company	
Milwaukee and Chicago Railroad		CNW	1857	1863	Chicago and Milwaukee Railway	
Milwaukee, Dexterville and Northern Railway		MILW	1884	1891	Chicago, Milwaukee and St. Paul Railway	
Milwaukee and Fond du Lac Railroad		MILW	1851	1853	Milwaukee, Fond du Lac and Green Bay Railroad	
Milwaukee, Fond du Lac and Green Bay Railroad		MILW	1853	1854	La Crosse and Milwaukee Railroad	
Milwaukee and Horicon Railroad		MILW	1852	1863	Milwaukee and St. Paul Railway	
Milwaukee, Lake Shore and Western Railroad		CNW	1872	1875	Milwaukee, Lake Shore and Western Railway	
Milwaukee, Lake Shore and Western Railway		CNW	1875	1893	Chicago and North Western Railway	
Milwaukee and Lake Winnebago Railroad		CP	1882	1899	Wisconsin Central Railway	
Milwaukee and Madison Railway		CNW	1880	1881	Chicago, Milwaukee and North Western Railway	
Milwaukee, Manitowoc and Green Bay Railroad		CNW	1870	1872	Milwaukee, Lake Shore and Western Railroad	
Milwaukee, Menomonee Falls and Western Railway		MILW	1885	1891	Milwaukee and Superior Railway	
Milwaukee and Mississippi Railroad		MILW	1850	1861	Milwaukee and Prairie du Chien Railway	
Milwaukee and Northern Railroad		MILW	1880	1893	Chicago, Milwaukee and St. Paul Railway	
Milwaukee and Northern Railway		MILW	1870	1880	Milwaukee and Northern Railroad	
Milwaukee and Northwestern Railway		CNW	1871	1872	Northwestern Union Railway	
Milwaukee and Prairie du Chien Railway		MILW	1861	1867	Milwaukee and St. Paul Railway	
The Milwaukee Road, Inc.	MILW	MILW	1985	1986	Soo Line Railroad	
Milwaukee and St. Paul Railway		MILW	1863	1874	Chicago, Milwaukee and St. Paul Railway	
Milwaukee, Sparta and North Western Railway		CNW	1909	1912	Chicago and North Western Railway	
Milwaukee and State Line Railway		CNW	1905	1909	Chicago and North Western Railway	
Milwaukee and Superior Railroad		MILW	1856	1859	Milwaukee and Northern Railway	
Milwaukee and Superior Railway		MILW	1891	1900	Chicago, Milwaukee and St. Paul Railway	
Milwaukee and Watertown Railroad		MILW	1851	1856	La Crosse and Milwaukee Railroad	
Milwaukee, Watertown and Baraboo Valley Railroad		MILW	1858	1861	Milwaukee and Western Railroad	
Milwaukee and Waukesha Railroad		MILW	1847	1850	Milwaukee and Mississippi Railroad	
Milwaukee and Western Railroad		MILW	1861	1863	Milwaukee and St. Paul Railway	
Mineral Point Railroad		MILW	1852	1880	Chicago, Milwaukee and St. Paul Railway	
Mineral Point and Northern Railway	MP&N		1899	1930	N/A	
Minneapolis, St. Paul and Ashland Railway			1894	1906	N/A	
Minneapolis, St. Paul and Sault Ste. Marie Railroad	SOO	CP	1944	1961	Soo Line Railroad	
Minneapolis, St. Paul and Sault Ste. Marie Railway	SOO	CP	1888	1944	Minneapolis, St. Paul and Sault Ste. Marie Railroad	
Minneapolis, Sault Ste. Marie and Atlantic Railway		CP	1883	1888	Minneapolis, St. Paul and Sault Ste. Marie Railway	
Minnesota, St. Croix and Wisconsin Railroad		CP	1884	1888	Wisconsin Central Company	
Minnesota and Wisconsin Railroad		CNW	1896	1902	Chicago, St. Paul, Minneapolis and Omaha Railway	
Minnesota and Wisconsin Railway		CNW	1892	1896	Minnesota and Wisconsin Railroad	
Miscauno and North-Western Railway			1905	1905	Wisconsin and Michigan Railway	
Necedah and Camp Douglas Railroad		MILW	1874	1878	Chicago, Milwaukee and St. Paul Railway	
Neillsville and North Eastern Railway		CNW	1881	1884	Chicago, St. Paul, Minneapolis and Omaha Railway	
Nicolet Badger Northern Railroad	NBNR		1980	1994	N/A	
North Wisconsin Railway		CNW	1871	1880	Chicago, St. Paul, Minneapolis and Omaha Railway	
Northern Pacific Railroad		NP	1864	1896	Northern Pacific Railway	
Northern Pacific Railway	NP	NP	1896	1970	Burlington Northern Inc.	
Northwestern Coal Railway		GN	1892	1953	Great Northern Railway	
Northwestern Union Railway		CNW	1872	1881	Chicago and Milwaukee Railway	
Oconto and South Western Railway		MILW	1889	1890	Milwaukee and Northern Railroad	
Oshkosh and Mississippi River Railroad		MILW	1866	1893	Chicago, Milwaukee and St. Paul Railway	
Oshkosh Transportation Company		CNW	1867	1984	Chicago and North Western Transportation Company	
Owen and Northern Railway		CP	1904	1908	Wisconsin Central Railway	
Packwaukee and Montello Railroad		CP	1881	1899	Wisconsin Central Railway	
Penokee Railroad		CP	1886	1888	Wisconsin Central Company	
Peshtigo Harbor Railroad			1862	1895	Wisconsin and Michigan Railway	
Pine River Valley and Stevens Point Railroad		MILW	1872	1880	Chicago, Milwaukee and St. Paul Railway	
Platteville and Calamine Railroad		MILW	1861	1867	Dubuque, Platteville and Milwaukee Railroad	
Port Edwards, Centralia and Northern Railway		CP	1890	1896	Marshfield and Southeastern Railroad	
Portage, Stevens Point and Superior Railroad		CP	1870	1870	Portage, Winnebago and Superior Railroad	
Portage and Superior Railroad		CP	1866	1869	Portage, Winnebago and Superior Railroad	
Portage, Winnebago and Superior Railroad		CP	1869	1871	Wisconsin Central Railroad	
Prairie du Chien and McGregor Railway		MILW	1872	1894	Chicago, Milwaukee and St. Paul Railway	
Princeton and North Western Railway		CNW	1900	1901	Chicago and North Western Railway	
Princeton and Western Railway		CNW	1883	1912	Milwaukee, Sparta and North Western Railway	
Racine, Janesville and Mississippi Railroad		MILW	1852	1855	Racine and Mississippi Railroad	
Racine and Mississippi Railroad		MILW	1855	1868	Western Union Railroad	
Rice Lake, Dallas and Menomonie Railway		CP	1893	1900	Minneapolis, St. Paul and Sault Ste. Marie Railway	
Rice Lake and Northern Railway		CP	1901	1902	Minneapolis, St. Paul and Sault Ste. Marie Railway	
Ripon and Wolf River Railroad		MILW	1856	1863	Milwaukee and St. Paul Railway	
Robbins Railroad			1898			
Rock River Railway		CNW	1880	1883	Chicago and North Western Railway	
Rock River Valley Union Railroad		CNW	1850	1855	Chicago, St. Paul and Fond du Lac Railroad	
Siskowit & Southern Railroad			1894	1895	Ashland, Siskowit & Iron River Railway	
St. Cloud – Grantsburgh and Ashland Railway		NP	1878	1899	St. Paul and Duluth Railroad	
St. Croix and Chippewa Falls Railroad		CP	1884	1884	Minnesota, St. Croix and Wisconsin Railroad	
St. Croix and Duluth Railway			1899	1908	Washburn & Northwestern Railroad	
St. Croix and Superior Railroad		MILW	1853	1857	La Crosse and Milwaukee Railroad	
St. Paul and Duluth Railroad		NP	1884	1900	Northern Pacific Railway	
St. Paul Eastern Grand Trunk Railway		CNW	1879	1913	Chicago and North Western Railway	
Sault Ste. Marie and Southwestern Railway		CNW	1887	1893	Chicago, St. Paul, Minneapolis and Omaha Railway	
Sheboygan and Fond du Lac Railroad		CNW	1861	1880	Sheboygan and Western Railway	
Sheboygan and Mississippi Railroad		CNW	1852	1861	Sheboygan and Fond du Lac Railroad	
Sheboygan and Western Railway		CNW	1880	1881	Chicago, Milwaukee and North Western Railway	
Southern Wisconsin Railroad		MILW	1852	1856	Milwaukee and Mississippi Railroad	
South Range Narrow Gauge Railroad	SRNG		1891	1896	N/A	
Stanley, Merrill and Phillips Railway			1894	1899	N/A	
State Line and Union Railroad		CNW	1871	1880	Elgin and State Line Railroad	
Sugar River Valley Railroad		MILW	1855	1880	Chicago, Milwaukee and St. Paul Railway	
Superior, Balsam Lake and Southern Railway		CP	1900	1901	Minneapolis, St. Paul and Sault Ste. Marie Railway	
Superior Belt Line and Terminal Railway		GN	1891	1900	Duluth, Superior and Western Terminal Company, Eastern Railway of Minnesota	
Superior and St. Croix Railroad		NP	1870	1896	Northern Pacific Railway	
Superior Short Line Railway		CNW	1884	1895	Chicago, St. Paul, Minneapolis and Omaha Railway	
Superior and Southeastern Railway			1920	1930		
Superior Terminal and Belt Line Railway		GN	1890	1891	Superior Belt Line and Terminal Railway	
Thunder River Railroad			1909	1927	N/A	
Tomah and Lake St. Croix Railroad		CNW	1863	1867	West Wisconsin Railway	
Tomahawk and Eastern Railway			1907	1919	N/A	
Tony and North Eastern Railway			1902	1903	Minneapolis, St. Paul and Sault Ste. Marie Railway	
Unity & Northwestern Railroad			1893	1897	N/A	
Viroqua Railway		MILW	1878	1880	Chicago, Milwaukee and St. Paul Railway	
Wabeno, Otter Lake & Eastern Railroad	WOLE		1905	1930	N/A	
Washburn, Bayfield and Iron River Railway		NP	1895	1902	Northern Pacific Railway	
Washburn & Northwestern Railroad	W&NW		1887	1905	White River Railroad	
Washburn & Northwestern Railroad	W&NW		1902	1910	N/A	
Watertown and Madison Railroad		MILW	1853	1858	Milwaukee, Watertown and Baraboo Valley Railroad	
Waupaca – Green Bay Railway		GB&W	1907	1921	Green Bay and Western Railroad	
West Range Railroad			1889	1897	Mineral Lake & Western Railroad	
West Wisconsin Railway		CNW	1867	1878	Chicago, St. Paul and Minneapolis Railway	
Western Union Railroad		MILW	1863	1900	Chicago, Milwaukee and St. Paul Railway	
Whitcomb and Morris Railway			1896			
White River Railroad	WRRR		1905	1914	N/A	
Winnebago Railroad		MILW	1853	1866	Oshkosh and Mississippi River Railroad	
Winnebago and Superior Railroad		CP	1866	1869	Portage, Winnebago and Superior Railroad	
Winona, Alma and Northern Railway		CB&Q	1883	1885	Chicago, Burlington and Northern Railroad	
Winona Bridge Railway		CB&Q/ GB&W	1890	1985	N/A	
Wisconsin and Calumet Railroad	WICT		1985	1997	Wisconsin and Southern Railroad	
Wisconsin Central Company		CP	1887	1899	Wisconsin Central Railway	
Wisconsin Central Railroad		CP	1954	1961	Soo Line Railroad	
Wisconsin Central Railroad		CP	1871	1899	Wisconsin Central Railway	
Wisconsin Central Railway		CP	1897	1954	Wisconsin Central Railroad	
Wisconsin and Chippewa Railway			1891	1898	Marinette, Tomahawk and Western Railway	
Wisconsin and Michigan Railroad		MILW	1881	1887	Milwaukee and Northern Railroad	
Wisconsin and Michigan Railroad			1918	1938	N/A	
Wisconsin and Michigan Railway	WAND		1992	1995	N/A	
Wisconsin and Michigan Railway			1894	1918	Wisconsin and Michigan Railroad	
Wisconsin Midland Railroad		MILW	1887	1897	Chicago, Milwaukee and St. Paul Railway	
Wisconsin and Minnesota Railroad		CP	1879	1888	Wisconsin Central Company	
Wisconsin and Northern Railroad	W&N	CP	1906	1921	Minneapolis, St. Paul and Sault Ste. Marie Railway	
Wisconsin Northern Railway		CNW	1896	1897	Chicago and North Western Railway	
Wisconsin & Northwestern Railway	W&NW		1906	1921	N/A	
Wisconsin, Pittsville and Superior Railway		MILW	1882	1891	Chicago, Milwaukee and St. Paul Railway	
Wisconsin, Ruby and Southern Railway	WRS		1907	1912	N/A	
Wisconsin and Superior Railroad		CNW	1856	1857	Chicago, St. Paul and Fond du Lac Railroad	
Wisconsin Union Railroad		MILW	1866	1872	Milwaukee and St. Paul Railway	
Wisconsin Valley Railroad		MILW	1871	1880	Chicago, Milwaukee and St. Paul Railway	
Wisconsin Western Railroad	WIWR		1982	1985	Wisconsin and Calumet Railroad	
Wisconsin Western Railroad		MILW	1899	1909	Chicago, Milwaukee and St. Paul Railway	
Wolf River Valley Railway		CNW	1906	1920	Chicago and North Western Railway	
Wolf and Wisconsin Rivers Railroad		CNW	1885	1889	Milwaukee, Lake Shore and Western Railway	
Wood County Railroad		MILW	1883	1891	Chicago, Milwaukee and St. Paul Railway	
Woodville and Southern Railway		CNW	1889	1892	Minnesota and Wisconsin Railway	

=== Private freight carriers ===
- A.A. Bigelow Lumber Company
- A.H. Stange Lumber Company
- Albert Hess Lumber Company
- Alexander-Stewart Lumber Company
- Arpin Hardwood & Lumber Company
- Ashland Lumber Company
- Atwood Lumber & Manufacturing Company
- B.F. McMillan & Brothers Logging Company
- Barker & Stewart Lumber Company
- Bird & Wells Lumber Company
- Bissell Lumber Company
- Blackwell & Webb Lumber Company
- Bonifas-Gorman Lumber Company
- Boyd-McAlpine Lumber Company
- Brooks & Ross Lumber Company
- Brown Robbins Lumber Company
- Buckstaff & Sprague Lumber Company
- Bundy Lumber Company
- Buswell Lumber & Manufacturing Company
- C.C. Collins Lumber Company
- C.J. Kinzel Lumber Company
- C.M. Christenson Company
- Charlie Fish Lumber Company
- Chequamegon Logging Company
- Chippewa Lumber & Boom Company
- Connor Land & Lumber Company
- Copper River Land Company
- Cranberry Lumber Company
- Crane Logging & Lumber Company
- Crocker Chair Company
- D.C. Davis & Sons Lumber Company
- Daly & Sampson Company
- David Tozer Lumber Company
- Dells Paper & Pulp Company
- Doud Sons & Company
- Edward Hines Hardwood & Hemlock Company
- Edward Hines Lumber Company
- Empire Lumber Company
- F.P. Hiles Lumber Company
- Fence River Logging Company
- Flambeau Lumber Company
- Flambeau Paper Company
- Flanner-Steger Lumber Company
- Forest County Lumber Company
- Forseman & Price Lumber Company
- Forster-Mueller Lumber Company
- Forster-Whitman Lumber Company
- Foster-Latimer Lumber Company
- Fountain-Campbell Lumber Company
- Garth Lumber Company
- Geo E. Wood Lumber Company
- George W. Pratt Lumber Company
- Gilkey & Anson Lumber Company
- Girard Lumber Company
- Glenwood Manufacturing Company
- Glidden Veneer Company
- Godfrey Von Platen Lumber Company
- Goodman Lumber Company
- Goodyear Lumber Company
- Great Western Paper Company
- Gurney Lumber Company
- H.D. Mc Cool Land & Logging Company
- H.H. Stolle Lumber Company
- H.J. Wachsmuth Lumber Company
- H.W. Wright Lumber Company
- Hackley-Phelps-Bonnell Lumber Company
- Haile & Mylrea Lumber Company
- Held Lumber Company
- Holmes and Sons Logging Railroad
- Holt Lumber Company
- Hiles Lumber Company
- Ingersoll Land & Lumber Company
- Ingram Lumber Company
- J.J. Kennedy Lumber Company
- J.R. Davis Lumber Company
- J.W. Wells Lumber Company
- Jeffries Lumber Company
- John Edwards Manufacturing Company
- John Hein Lumber Company
- John H. Kaiser Lumber Company
- John Schroeder Lumber Company
- John S. Owen Lumber Company
- Joseph Defer Lumber Company
- Joseph Dessert Lumber Company
- Jump River Lumber Company
- Keith & Hiles Lumber Company
- Kimball & Clark Lumber Company
- Kneeland-McLurg Lumber Company
- Kneeland-West Lumber Company
- Lake Superior Lumber Company
- Land Log & Lumber Company
- Langlade Lumber Company
- Langley & Alderson
- Luger Lumber Company
- Mason-Donaldson Lumber Company
- McMillan-Salsich Lumber Company
- Medford Lumber Company
- Mellen Lumber Company
- Menasha Paper Company
- Menasha Woodenware Company
- Menominee Bay Shore Lumber Company
- Menominee Indian Mills
- Merrill Lumber Company
- Miner Brothers Lumber Company
- Mohr Lumber Company
- Morse & Tradewell Lumber Company
- Mosinee Paper Company
- Nash Lumber Company
- New Dells Lumber Company
- Northwestern Lumber Company
- North Wisconsin Lumber & Manufacturing Company
- Oconto Company
- O'Day & Daley Lumber Company
- Page & Landeck Lumber Company
- Paine Lumber Company
- Park Falls Lumber Company
- Peshtigo Lumber Company
- Pineville Lumber Company
- Puffer-Hubbard Lumber Company
- Quinnesec Logging Company
- R. Connor Lumber Company
- Raymond Lumber Company
- Rib Lake Lumber Company
- Rice Lake Lumber Company
- Robbins Lumber Company
- Roddis Lumber & Veneer Company
- Rust-Owen Lumber Company
- S.G. Cook
- S.J. Murphy Lumber Company
- Salsich & Wilson Lumber Company
- Sawyer-Goodman Lumber Company
- Scott & Howe Lumber Company
- Sever Anderson Logging Company
- Shanagolden Lumber Company
- Shawano Timber & Land Company
- Shores Lumber Company
- Simpson Gould & Company
- Spider Lake Lumber Company
- Sparrow-Kroll Lumber Company
- St Croix Timber & Land Company
- Stitt & Cartier
- Stuart & Sprague Lumber Company
- Thunder Lake Lumber Company
- Tipler-Grossman Lumber Company
- Tomahawk Land Company
- Turtle Lake Lumber Company
- Underwood Veneer Company
- Union Tanning Company
- Upham Manufacturing Company
- Vilas County Lumber Company
- Von Platen-Fox Lumber Company
- W.A. Osburn Lumber Company
- W.F. Switzer Lumber Company
- W.H. Gilbert Company
- Wall-Spaulding Lumber Company
- Westboro Lumber Company
- West Lumber Company
- William Bonifas Lumber Company
- William Holmes & Sons
- William Rogers Lumber Company
- Williams Salsich & Company
- Wisconsin-Michigan Lumber Company
- Wisconsin Timber & Land Company
- Yawkey & Lee Lumber Company
- Yawkey-Bissell Lumber Company

=== Electric ===
- Appleton Electric Light and Power Company
- Ashland Light, Power and Street Railway Company
- Ashland Lighting and Street Railway Company
- Bay Shore Street Railway
- Belle City Electric Railway
- Belle City Street Railway
- Beloit Traction Company
- Chicago, Harvard and Geneva Lake Railway
- Chicago and Milwaukee Electric Railroad
- Chicago North Shore and Milwaukee Railroad
- Chippewa Valley Railway, Light and Power Company
- Chippewa Valley Electric Railroad
- Citizens' Traction Company of Oshkosh
- Eastern Wisconsin Railway and Light Company
- Eau Claire Street Railway, Light and Power Company
- Fond du Lac and Oshkosh Electric Railway
- Fond du Lac Street Railway and Light Company
- Fox River Electric Railway
- Fox River Electric Railway and Power Company
- Fox River Valley Electric Railway
- Grand Rapids Street Railroad
- Green Bay Traction Company
- Janesville Street Railway
- Kenosha Electric Railway
- La Crosse City Railway
- La Crosse and Onalaska Street Railway
- Madison City Railway
- Madison Electric Railway
- Madison and Interurban Traction Company
- Madison Traction Company
- Manitowoc and Northern Traction Company
- Marinette Gas, Electric Light and Street Railway Company
- Menasha and Neenah Street Railway
- Merrill Railway and Lighting Company
- Milwaukee City Railroad
- Milwaukee Light, Heat and Traction Company
- Milwaukee Northern Railway
- Milwaukee, Racine and Kenosha Electric Railway
- Milwaukee Street Railway
- Milwaukee and Wauwatosa Electric Company
- Milwaukee and Wauwatosa Motor Railway
- Milwaukee and Wauwatosa Rapid Transit Company
- Milwaukee Western Electric Railway
- Neenah and Menasha Railway
- North Greenfield and Waukesha Electric Railway
- Oshkosh Street Railroad
- Sheboygan Railway and Electric Company
- Sheboygan City Railway
- Sheboygan Light, Power and Railway Company
- Southern Wisconsin Railway
- Superior Rapid Transit Railway
- The Milwaukee Electric Railway and Light Company
- Waukesha Beach Electric Railway
- Waukesha Electric Railway
- Waupaca Electric Light and Railway Company
- Wausau Street Railroad
- West Side Railroad
- Winnebago Traction Company
- Wisconsin Railway, Light and Power Company
- Wisconsin Electric Railway
- Wisconsin Gas and Electric Company
- Wisconsin Public Service Company
- Wisconsin Rapid Transit Company
- Wisconsin Traction, Light, Heat and Power Company

=== Not completed ===
- Bayfield and St. Croix Railway (St. Croix, Superior, and Bayfield Railway ?)

== See also ==
- 2020 Wisconsin railroad map
