= Wisconsin Northern Railroad =

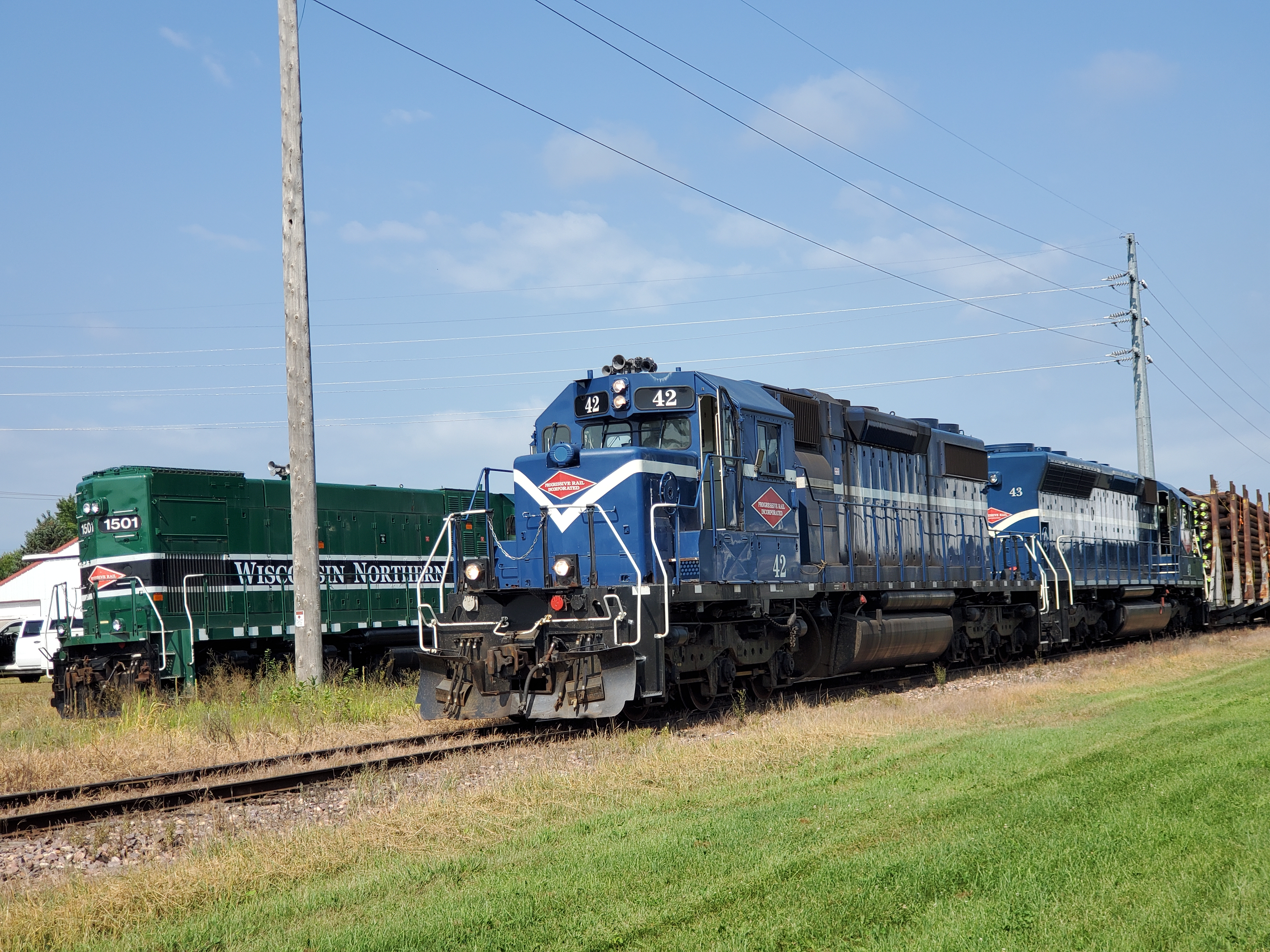
- Wisconsin Northern locomotives 1501, 42, and 43 in Chetek

Overview
- Parent company: Progressive Rail, Inc.
- Headquarters: Lakeville, Minnesota
- Reporting mark: WN
- Locale: Northern Wisconsin
- Dates of operation: November 29, 2004–present
- Predecessor: Chicago and North Western Railway

Technical
- Track gauge: 4 ft 8 1/2 in (1,435 mm) standard gauge
- Length: 62.3 mi (100.3 km)

Other
- Website: progressiverail.com/rrwnr/wnr.html

The Wisconsin Northern Railroad (reporting mark WN) is the trade name employed by Progressive Rail to operate 62.3 miles (100.3 km) of railroad in northern Wisconsin and began operations on November 29, 2004.

== Trackage ==
The railroad operates on trackage leased from the Union Pacific Railroad (UP) and Wisconsin Central Limited (WC). The UP trackage extends north from Norma, a junction with the UP in northern Chippewa Falls, to Cameron. It was completed by the Chippewa Falls and Northern Railway, a predecessor of the Chicago and Northwestern Railway, in 1883.

At Cameron, the Wisconsin Northern splits, with WC trackage continuing north to Rice Lake and west to Almena. The Rice Lake line was opened by the Rice Lake, Dallas and Menomonie Railway in 1894, and the Almena line by the Minneapolis, Sault Ste. Marie and Atlantic Railway in 1884. Both became part of the Minneapolis, St. Paul and Sault Ste. Marie Railroad (Soo Line), and were spun off to the WC in 1987.

== Major commodities ==
In the past, traffic consisted of shipments of resins, scrap materials, lumber, logs, fertilizer, steel, feed grade grains, and tallow. However, in December 2011, EOG Resources opened a frac sand processing plant. Sand now represents over 90% of the shipments, with the railroad hauling an estimated 160,000 tons of sand per month. This volume of traffic has required a total rebuilding of much of the trackage as well as construction of new interchange and car staging yards. This new booming mining business, while making the Wisconsin Northern quite profitable, has also killed the railroad's hopes of expanding its trackage rights. Progressive Rail had planned to contract with the state of Wisconsin to operate a 45-mile extension that would have connected the Wisconsin Northern with the Canadian National mainline, however when the CN discovered the booming Wisconsin sand market, they backed out of the sale of the rail line they had attempted to previously abandon.

== The Sand Boom 2011-2020 ==
After the sand mines opened, traffic increased. several sand mines were built, including 3 in the Dovre\ Chetek\new auburn area. two were built in new auburn. Like it said early, this was also the cause for some losses. prior to the sand boom, the WN operated tracks that ran from Poskin to Cameron, and a line to rice lake. CN stopped allowing service to these routes around the same time they backed out on the 45-mile extension. As of today, these routes are operated by CN. They also lost direct connection to the Cameron diamond. The railroads current northern most track is the stella-jones corporation. north of that is abandoned trackage. it becomes unabandoned near the south side of the diamond, specifically near the siding. Just as the railroad was peaking, however, it started to decline.

== Post sand Boom 2020-now ==
When covid struck, the railroad became dead. the sand mines closed and were eventually sold to different people. almost every inch and track available was used as storage for the abundance of 2-bay hoppers. Trains became less frequent. Some businesses didn't stop operating, though. the stella-jones corporation is to this day a customer. recently, however, the railroad has begun to boom again. after selling off the mines, Scott Beers became a customer. He started off transporting canned goods from Chetek. he then bought the northern most sand mine, near Chetek. the rail road swapped out the 2-bays for grandola hoppers.

== Equipment ==
The railroad's locomotive roster is on loan from parent Progressive Rail and includes one EMD SW1500, two EMD GP15-1s, an EMD SD38-2, and two new EMD SD40M-2s. units operating along the system.

Number	Model	Lettered	Status
1500	EMD GP15-1	City of Barron	Operative(maybe)
42	EMD SD38-2		Operative
43	EMD SD40M-2		Operative
45	EMD SD40M-2		Operative
1501	EMD GP15-1	City of Bloomer	Operative

== See also ==
- List of United States railroads
- List of Wisconsin railroads
- Progressive Rail, Inc.
