= Pikes Creek Tragedy =

1884 train wreck in Wisconsin

Coordinates: 46.78528°N 90.86348°W

The Pikes Creek Tragedy was a train wreck that took place on Oct. 2, 1884, costing the lives of ten men and injuring several others. The derailment occurred on the Bayfield branch of the Chicago, St. Paul, Minneapolis and Omaha Railway, roughly midway between the towns of Bayfield and Washburn, Wisconsin. Years later, one writer recounting the incident commented, "It is doubtful if a worse tragedy ever occurred in this vicinity than that of October 2, 1884."

== The incident ==
The derailment took place less than a year after the railroad's Bayfield branch was completed. Pikes Creek, normally a small, meandering stream, was running exceptionally high that day after almost a week of heavy rain. During the morning, a small section of track washed out about one-quarter mile south of Bayfield. News was telegraphed to Washburn, the next station south, and just after noon, the railroad dispatched a work train, with three flatcars loaded with logs and other supplies, and a work crew of twenty-two men. With no caboose or crew car, the men rode wherever they found room: some on the flatcars, some crowded into the locomotive cab, and two rode on the cowcatcher.

The train never reached the site of that washout, however. Earlier in the day, unknown to the railroad, Pikes Creek's rushing waters had swept away a small dam upstream from the railroad bridge. The ensuing torrent undermined the north approach to the bridge, where it could not be seen from the oncoming train as it approached, traveling about fifteen miles per hour. The undermined section gave way as the train went across it, and the locomotive turned on its side. A broken rail pierced its boiler, sending a blast of steam into the cab. The men in the cab were scalded to death, while others were crushed in the jumble of flatcars and their cargo of logs.

One of the few uninjured crewmen ran three miles to Bayfield for aid, and telegrams calling for help went out to Washburn and Ashland. With only primitive roads in the area at the time, the railroad assembled a special rescue train at Washburn, and a boat left Ashland with a physician aboard. Other aid came from members of a Masonic Lodge that was holding a funeral service close by, among whom was another physician.

== Victims ==
The eventual death toll amounted to ten, including the train's engineer, conductor, and brakeman, along with seven men of the track crew. Some died instantly, others lingered one or more days. The injured were taken to Ashland's two small hospitals, taxing their capacities to the limit. A local dentist organized a house-to-house collection for bedding and other supplies, while women formed sewing bees to make quilts and bedding for the victims.

Five of the section hands, Frank Carlson, Andrew L. Johnson, Matt Connell, Patrick Nealis, and Fred Heurlin, were buried together in Ashland's Mount Hope Cemetery under a sandstone monument that read, "All of whom were injured at Pike's Creek near Bayfield, Wis. Oct. 2, 1884, and died soon after." Victims buried elsewhere were Engineer James Babington, Conductor John McCoy, Fireman Louis Morris, and section hands Michael McCarty and Nat Wilson.

== Legacy ==
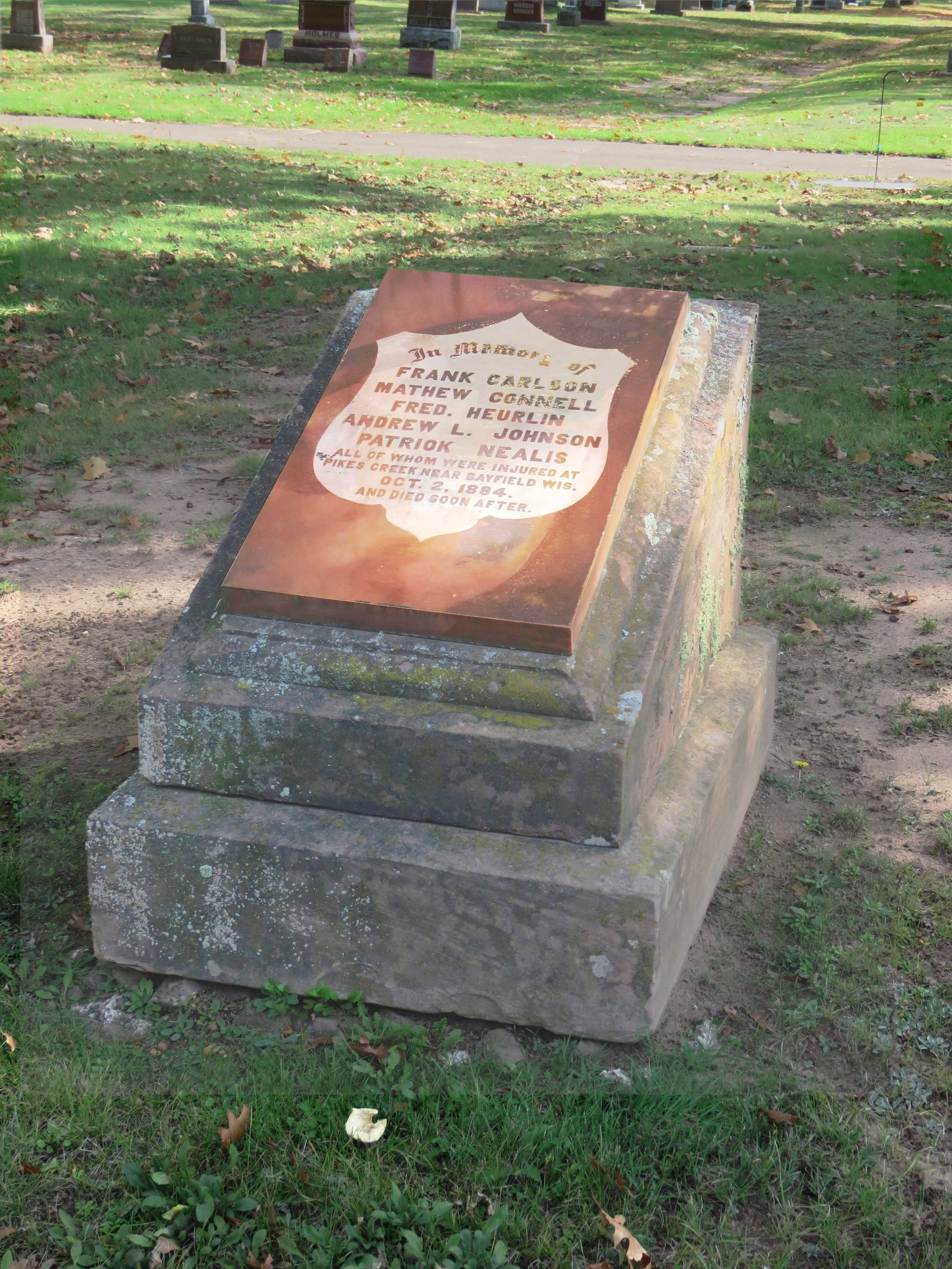
Common grave for five of the victims of the train wreck at Pikes Creek, near Bayfield, Wisconsin, Oct. 2, 1884.

The accident, quickly dubbed the "Pikes Creek Tragedy", received coast-to-coast news coverage in articles that varied considerably in sensationalism and accuracy. A local history published in 1929 described the event in detail, but by 2023, according to one local historian, the wreck had become all but forgotten, and its location obscured by highway construction. That year, an ad hoc citizens group raised funds to place a marker near the site of the incident.
