= Wisconsin and Southern Railroad =

Class II regional railroad in Southern Wisconsin and Northeastern Illinois

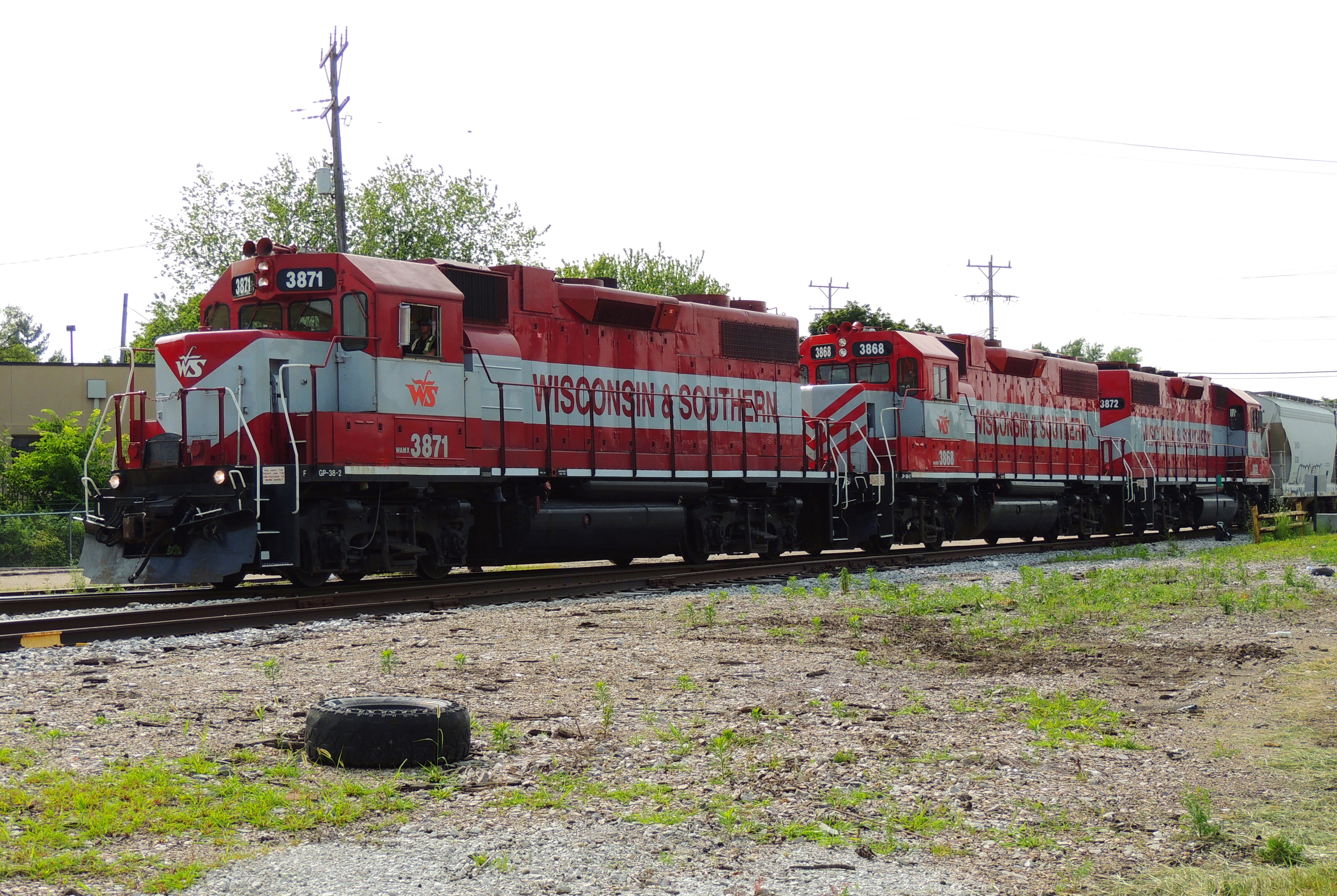
- A Wisconsin and Southern train in Milwaukee

Overview
- Parent company: Watco
- Headquarters: Madison, Wisconsin
- Reporting mark: WSOR (1980-2011); WAMX (2011-Current)
- Locale: Southern Wisconsin, Northeastern Illinois
- Dates of operation: 1980–present
- Predecessor: Chicago, Milwaukee, St. Paul and Pacific Railroad; Chicago and North Western Transportation Company; Wisconsin and Calumet Railroad

Technical
- Track gauge: 4 ft 8 1/2 in (1,435 mm) standard gauge
- Length: 837 mi (1,347 km)

Other
- Website: www.watco.com

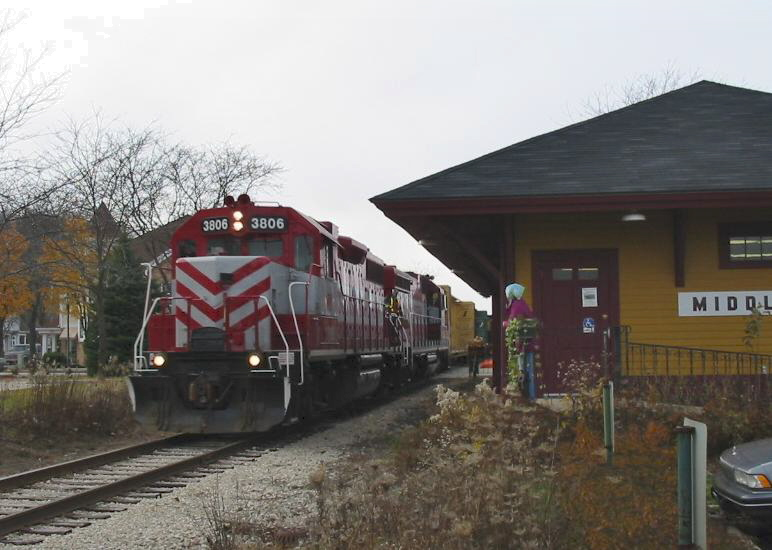
A Wisconsin and Southern train passes the Middleton, Wisconsin depot eastbound toward Madison

The Wisconsin and Southern Railroad (reporting mark WSOR) is a Class II regional railroad in Southern Wisconsin and Northeastern Illinois currently operated by Watco. It operates former Chicago, Milwaukee, St. Paul and Pacific Railroad (Milwaukee Road) and Chicago and North Western Railway (C&NW) trackage, mostly acquired by the state of Wisconsin in the 1980s.

Within Wisconsin, WSOR connects with four western Class I railroads: BNSF Railway, Canadian National Railway, Canadian Pacific Kansas City, and Union Pacific Railroad. Through trackage rights over Metra, WSOR accesses Chicago to connect with the two eastern Class I railroads, CSX Transportation and Norfolk Southern Railway. WSOR also has access to harbor facilities in Prairie du Chien, and transload facilities are located in Milwaukee, Janesville, Madison, and Oshkosh.

For train operation purposes, the WSOR system is divided into two divisions, the Northern Division and the Southern Division. The Northern Division is essentially the original WSOR trackage from 1980, with a few new lines that have been added around the Milwaukee area since the 1990s. It includes the line northwest from Milwaukee to Horicon, where it splits into branches to Cambria and Oshkosh, as well as a line from Milwaukee north to Kiel. The Southern Division includes the lines acquired from the Wisconsin and Calumet Railroad in 1992, centered on Madison and Janesville, as well as several lines acquired in the 1990s in the Madison area. The two divisions are not physically connected with WSOR-owned trackage, but trackage rights over a short section of Canadian National's Waukesha Subdivision from Waukesha to Slinger provide a link between the two divisions.

WSOR is headquartered in Madison, which is also a central hub terminal. The train dispatching office is located in Horicon. Locomotive maintenance is centered in Janesville, with secondary work also being performed at Horicon. WSOR's Horicon paint shops perform contract work on both rolling stock and locomotives.

== History ==
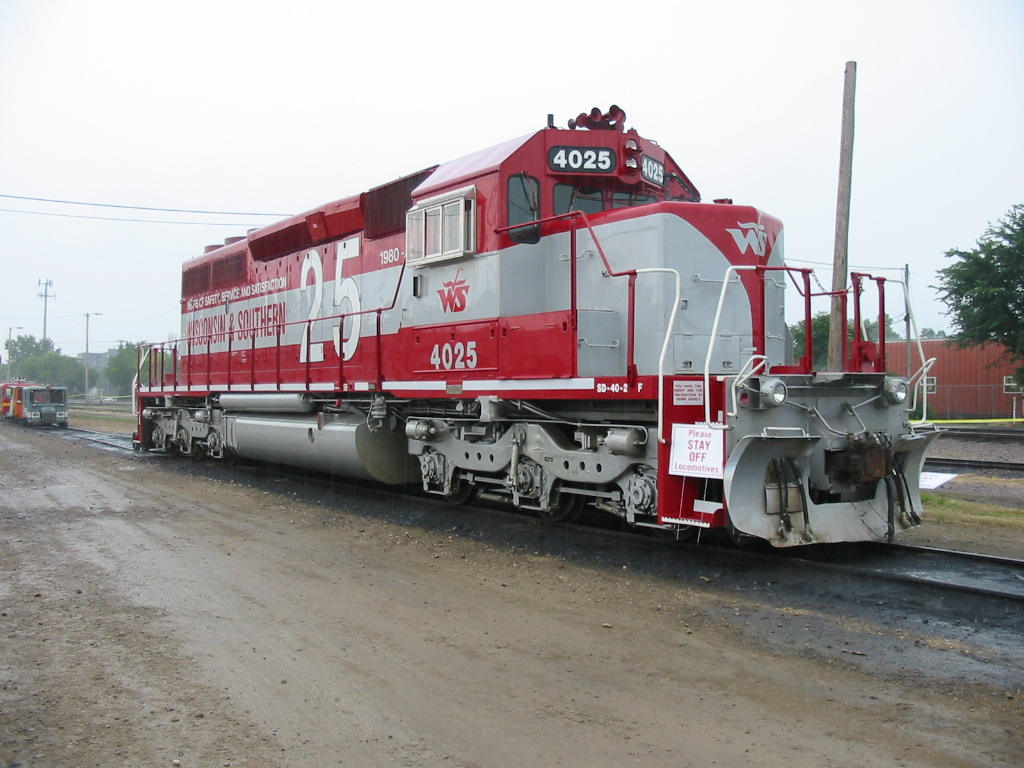
Wisconsin and Southern #4025 in its 25th anniversary livery at the open house party in Madison

WSOR began operations in 1980 when the state acquired several Milwaukee Road branch lines and signed a 50-year agreement with the Wisconsin and Southern Railroad, organized by the FSC Corporation, which also owned the Upper Merion and Plymouth Railroad. In August 1992, WSOR gained control of the Wisconsin and Calumet Railroad, which had been created in 1985 to replace the Chicago, Madison and Northern Railroad's operations on state-owned lines formerly part of the Milwaukee Road and Illinois Central Gulf Railroad. The latter was abandoned in 1997 except for a short stub in Madison. The short stub was abandoned in 2012, when the Charter Street Heating Plant in Madison discontinued using coal as their fuel source. WSOR thus gained access to Chicago (through trackage rights over Metra from Fox Lake), Janesville, Madison, and Prairie du Chien. Further expansion came with a lease from the Union Pacific Railroad (UP) of Madison-area ex-C&NW trackage in 1996, and of an ex-Milwaukee Road line between Madison and Watertown from the Soo Line Railroad in 1998 (sold outright in 2003). The most recent acquisition was north of Milwaukee in 2005, when the state purchased the ex-Milwaukee Road line between Saukville and Kiel, which Wisconsin Central Ltd. was going to abandon. Soon thereafter, WSOR leased in part and bought in part an ex-C&NW line to Sheboygan from UP.

WSOR was named the 2009 Regional Railroad of the Year by Railway Age magazine.

On April 11, 2011, WSOR's president and chief executive officer (CEO), William Gardner, was charged with two felonies after he was accused of funneling more than $60,000 in illegal campaign contributions through WSOR employees during the 2010 Wisconsin gubernatorial election. Gardner agreed to plead guilty to two felony counts. Under a deal, prosecutors agreed not to seek jail time but instead would seek two years of probation. In a statement, Gardner acknowledged his mistakes and said he took full responsibility. The vast majority of the contributions were to Wisconsin Governor Scott Walker.

On November 29, 2011, it was announced that WSOR would be acquired by Watco, with the deal to close on January 1, 2012.

In December 2012, the state of Wisconsin issued $17.1 million in financial aid to WSOR to rehabilitate 11 miles (18 km) of rail line between Plymouth and Kohler, which connects with existing WSOR tracks at Plymouth. Service has begun as of 2015.

WSOR operated a terminal railroad in Madison called the Madison Terminal Railway from 2010 to 2015 to service a transloading facility in Madison WI. This spur was less than a half mile long.

== Routes ==
=== North Division ===
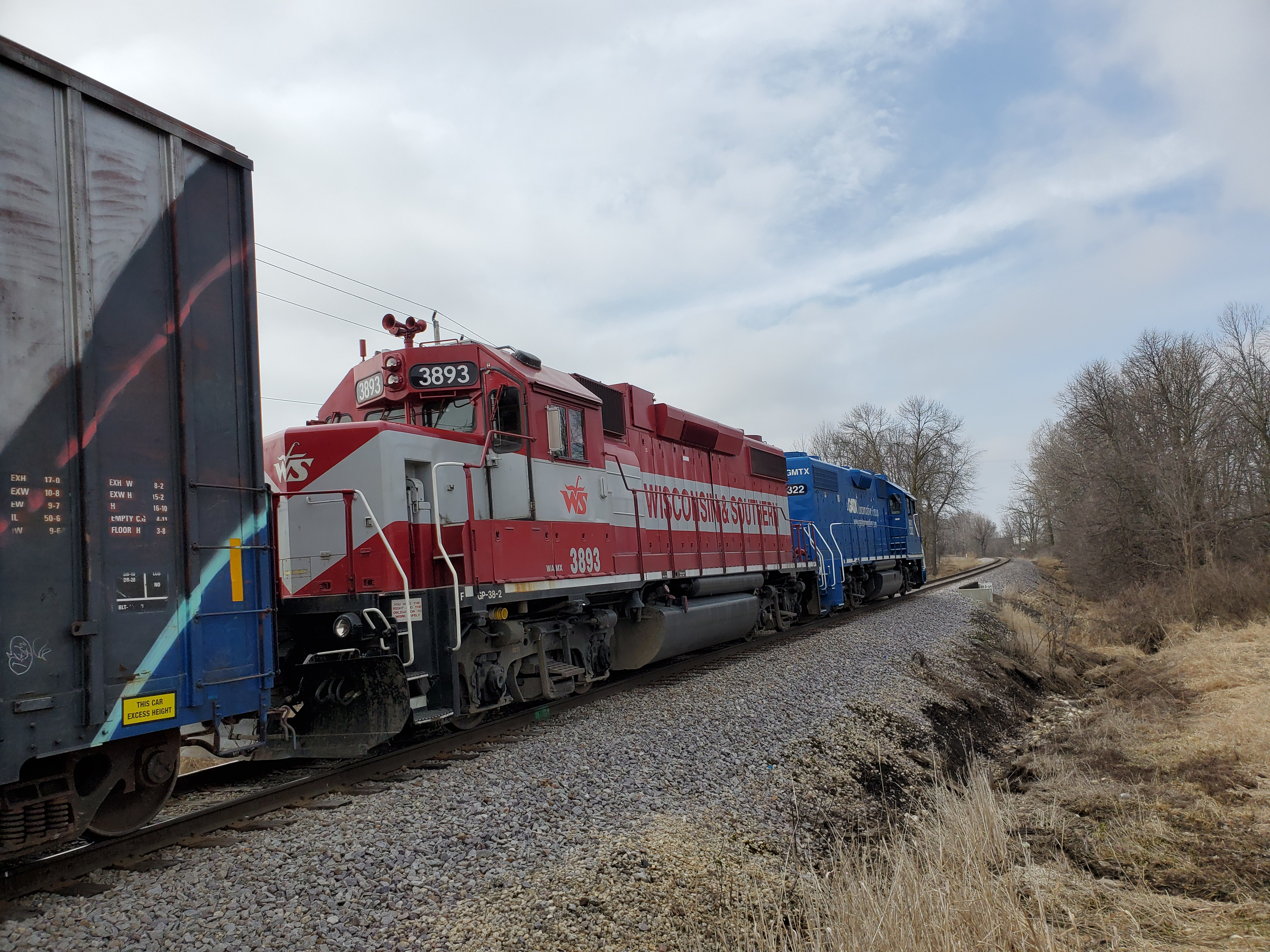
WAMX 3893, an EMD GP38-2, in Hartford on March 27, 2020.

- Milwaukee Subdivision (former MILW) – Main North Division line that runs from the paint shops in Horicon to the north side of Milwaukee. Commodities can range from grain and chemicals to lumber and ballast.
- Cambria Subdivision (former MILW) – Runs from Cambria to Horicon.
- Oshkosh Subdivision (former MILW) – Runs from Oshkosh to Horicon. Commodities are mostly grain and chemicals.
- Markesan Subdivision (former MILW) – Runs from Markesan to Brandon. Commodities are mostly grain.
- Plymouth Subdivision (former MILW) – Runs from a connection with the Canadian National Railway in Kiel to another connection in Saukville. The line through Kiel is out of service and used for car storage. Main commodities are transload products and chemicals.
- Sheboygan Falls Subdivision (former CNW) – Recently reopened in 2015. Runs from Plymouth to Sheboygan. Commodities are grain, aggregates, chemicals, and lumber.
- Mayville Spur (former MILW) – Runs from Mayville to Iron Ridge. Commodities are limestone and packaged products.
- Gibson Spur (former MILW) – Runs through North Milwaukee.
- Fox Lake Spur (former MILW) – Used for car storage for about a mile from Fox Lake.

=== South Division ===
- Madison Subdivision (former MILW) – A main line along with the Waukesha and Fox Lake Subdivisions, runs from Madison to Janesville where it connects with the Union Pacific Railroad and the Canadian Pacific Railway through the Iowa, Chicago and Eastern Railroad subsidiary.
- Prairie Subdivision (former MILW) – Runs from Prairie Du Chien to Madison. Main commodities are mostly grain and frac sand but also include lumber, chemicals, plastics, and fertilizer.
- Waukesha Subdivision (former MILW) – One of their main lines along with the Madison and Fox Lake Subdivision, most has been converted to welded rail. Connects with the Madison Subdivision in Milton and the Canadian National Railway in Waukesha. Commodities include anything from grain to chemicals to lumber.
- Monroe Subdivision (former MILW) – Runs from Monroe to Janesville. Main commodities are mostly grain, corn, and liquefied ethanol.
- Fox Lake Subdivision (former MILW) – A main line along with the Waukesha and Madison Subdivisions, connects Janesville with Fox Lake, Illinois. There is a very large variety of commodities on this subdivision. From Fox Lake to Rondout, the tracks are owned by Metra. The line connects to the C&M Subdivision in Rondout which leads directly into Chicago; the WSOR has trackage rights over these sections. Through the trackage rights into Chicago, this subdivision allows WSOR to interchange with each of the North American Class I railroads.
- Elkhorn Subdivision (former MILW) – Runs from Bardwell to Elkhorn. Main commodities are grain, lumber, cold storage products, and aggregates.
- Reedsburg Subdivision (former CNW) – Runs from Reedsburg to Brooklyn. Commodities range from ballast to lumber and scrap but also include plastics, sand, grain, and chemicals. Sections originally were built as the Beloit & Madison Railroad and Baraboo Air Line Railroad.
- Cottage Grove Subdivision (former CNW) – Runs from Madison to Cottage Grove and serves an ethanol processing plant.
- Watertown Subdivision (former MILW) – Runs from Madison to Watertown where it interchanges with the Canadian Pacific Railway and Rail & Transload. Main commodities are grain, plastics, scrap, ballast, chemicals, and lumber. CP has trackage rights from Watertown to a quarry east of Waterloo, where trains are often sent from Portage to load and unload ballast.
- Sauk Spur (former MILW) – Runs from Sauk City to a connection with the Prairie Subdivision in Mazomanie. Only part is used but only for car storage, the rest to Sauk City is heavily out of service.

== See also ==
- List of United States railroads
- List of Wisconsin railroads

== Images ==
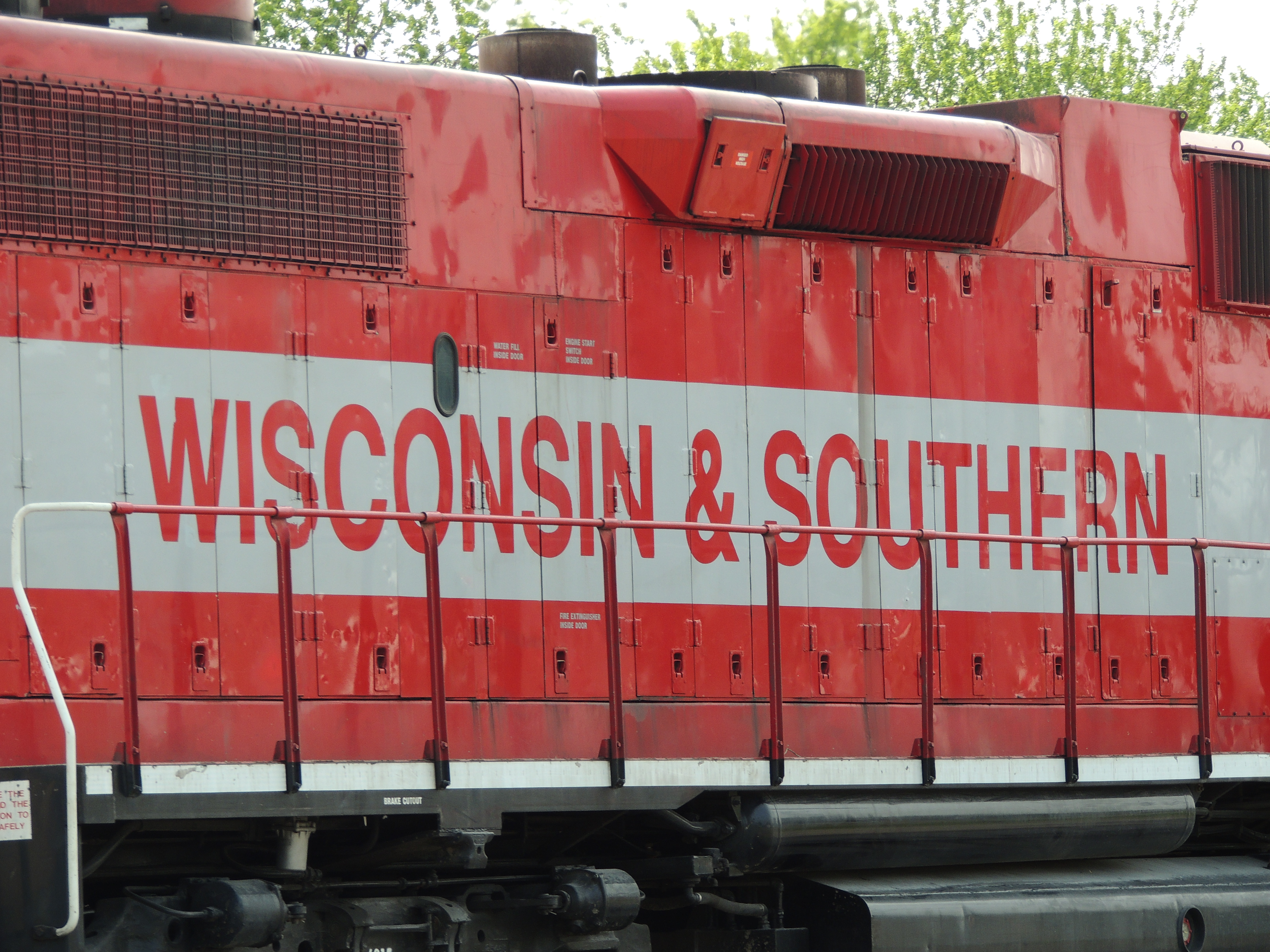
The side of a Wisconsin and Southern locomotive

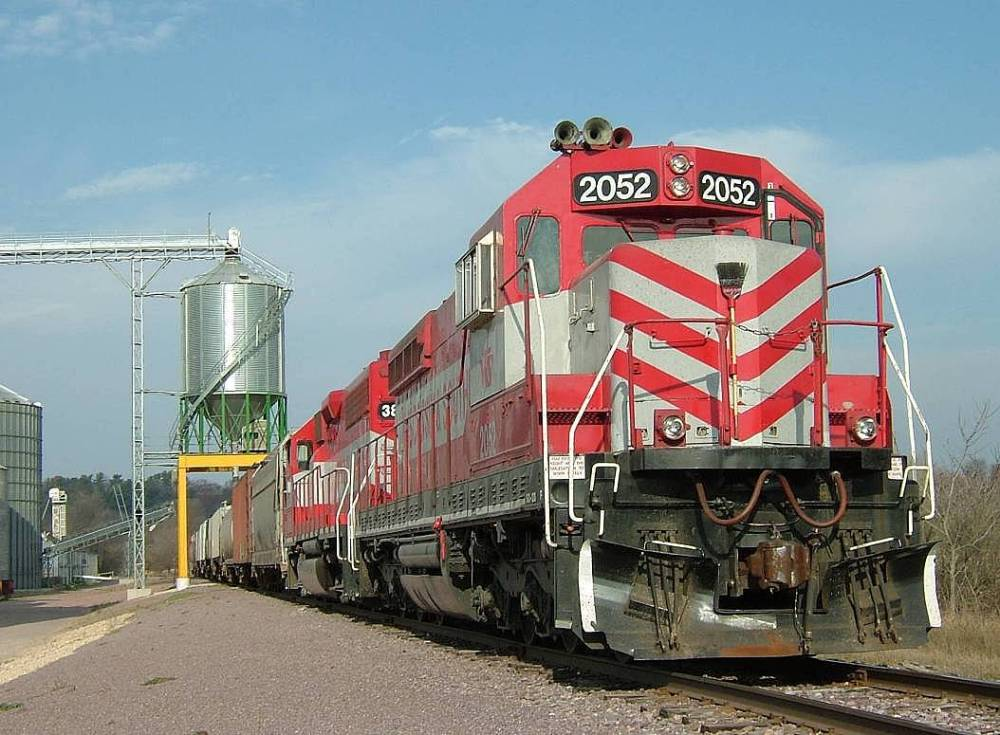
A Wisconsin and Southern grain train loads at a co-op in Rock Springs, Wisconsin

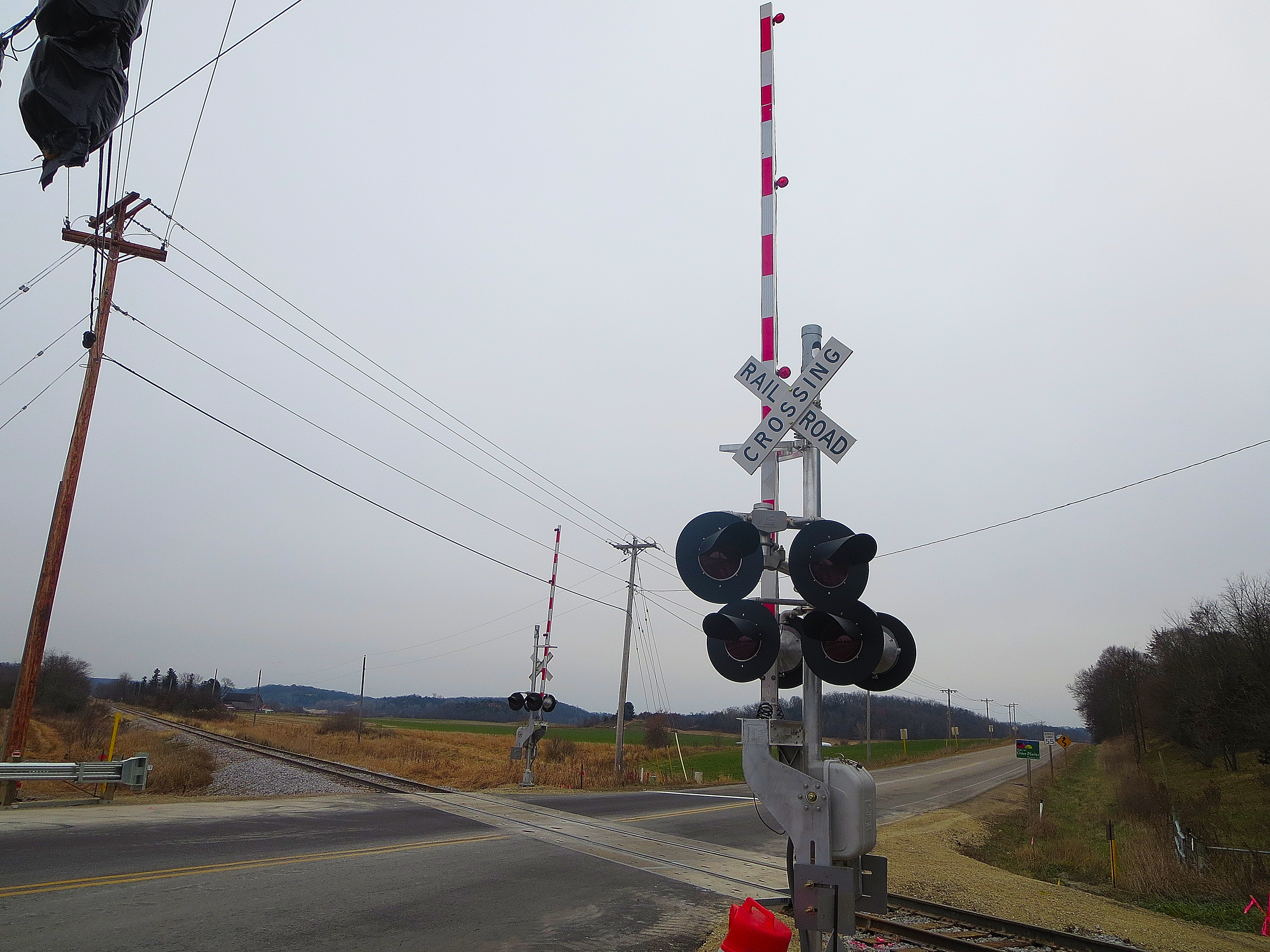
WSOR County Trunk Highway P Crossings

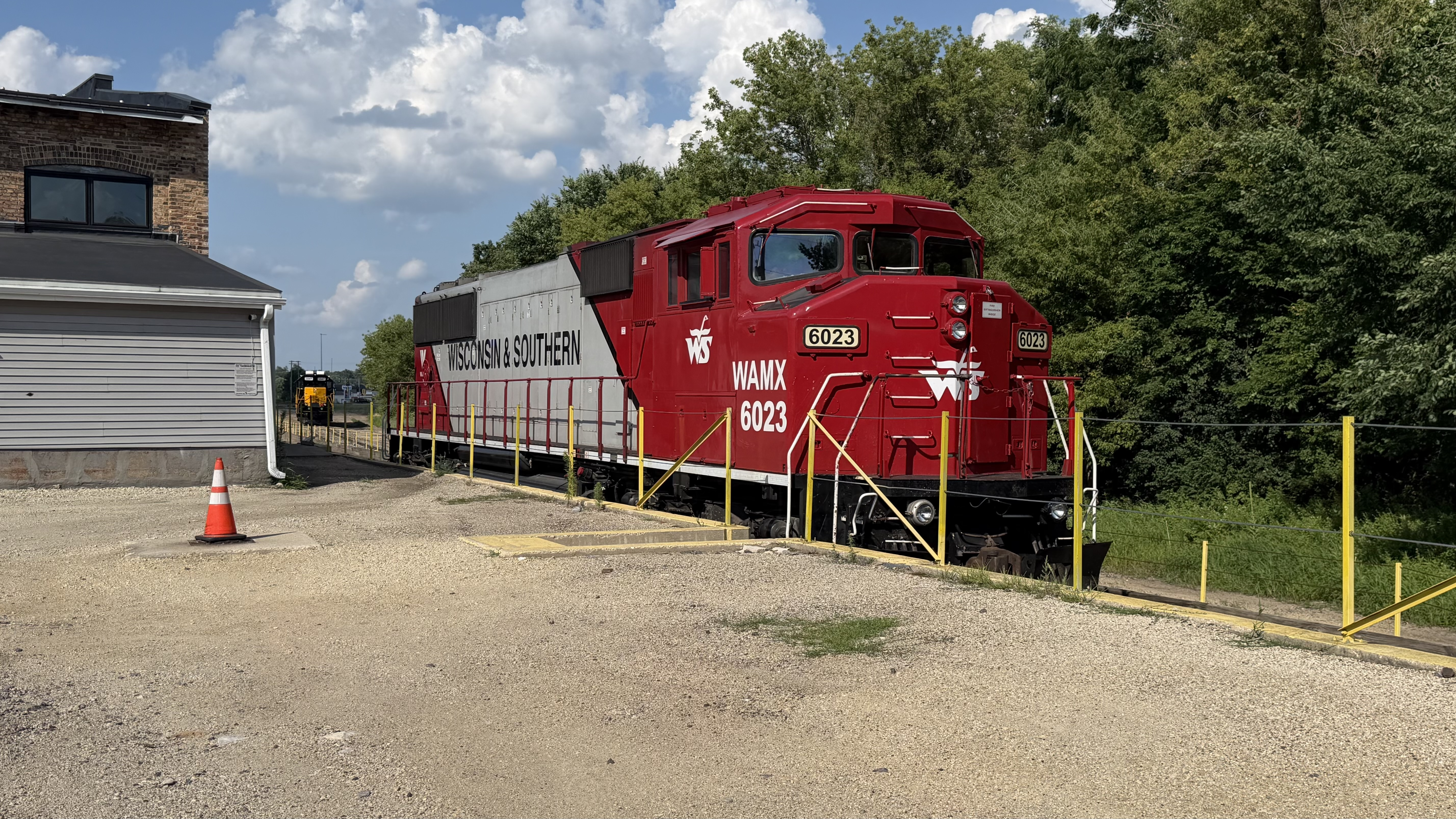
Wisconsin Southern Railroad locomotive WAMX 6023.

Preceded by Bessemer and Lake Erie Railroad	Regional Railroad of the Year; 2001	Succeeded by Reading Blue Mountain and Northern Railroad
