= Nicolet Badger Northern Railroad =

Railway line in the United States of America

Overview
- Headquarters: Laona, Wisconsin
- Reporting mark: NBN
- Locale: Northern Wisconsin
- Dates of operation: 1983–1994

Technical
- Track gauge: 4 ft 8 1/2 in (1,435 mm) standard gauge
- Length: 37.83 miles (60.88 km)

The Nicolet Badger Northern Railway (Reporting Marks NBN) was a logging railroad that operated within the Nicolet National Forest in Northern Wisconsin. The NBN operated over 38 miles of track from Wabeno, Wisconsin north to Tipler, Wisconsin.

== History ==
In 1896, a company named the Wisconsin Northern Railway was organized to build 115 miles of track north from a junction near Gillett on the Chicago & Northwestern line. Forty-six miles of track were completed as far as Wabeno in 1897, and the line was purchased immediately by C&NW and merged into the system, in 1899 the line was extended to Siding 62, about five miles north of Laona. This was as far as it could go without crossing the Soo Line north of Laona. After a lengthy legal struggle, the C&NW was finally allowed to cross the Soo tracks at grade in 1905. Pulpwood was practically the only business on the Laona Line by the end of 1961.

Traffic volume continued to drop off until operation was reduced to a single train a week. In 1979, the ICC gave C&NW permission to abandon the line. As reported in the Summer 1983 Northwestern Line Magazine, a 37.79-mile segment of the line between Wabeno and Tipler was sold for continued operation as a short line. The last time a Chicago & Northwestern crew operated a train on the Laona Line was June 29, 1979.

The line was bought by WISDOT the same year, when the C&NW abandoned it. In 1983 the Nicolet Badger Northern Railway Limited was formed to run revenue freight to the Soo Line at Laona Jct. After severe loss of business in the early 1990s the NBN ceased operation on December 30, 1994. The former right-of-way is now part of the Nicolet State Trail.

== Rolling Stock ==
Nicolet Badger Northern Rolling Stock
Number	Marked	Type	Prev owners	Other
82083	NBNR	Caboose	Tomahawk Railway.	Ex-MTW,

== Motive Power ==
Nicolet Badger Northern Motive Power
Number	Model	Prev owners	Other
62	EMD NW2	Tomahawk Railway.	Ex-DTI 914, Now MWLX 62.
103	Whitcomb 65 Ton	Laona and Northern Railway.	Ex-LNO 103, Scrapped 2006
207	Baldwin RS-12	Escanaba and Lake Superior Railroad.	Leased from ELS, Inactive.
