= Chicago, St. Paul and Minneapolis Railway =

The Chicago, St. Paul and Minneapolis Railway was authorized in 1879 to build a railroad from the Eastern border of Minnesota to Minneapolis. In 1878, it obtained the re-organized West Wisconsin Railway, which had built from Hudson, Wisconsin to Elroy, Wisconsin.

In 1881, it obtained the re-organized St. Paul and Sioux City Railroad, from its railroad junction in Le Mars, Iowa north to St. Paul. This trackage is currently part of the Union Pacific Railroad route from St. Paul to Sioux City, Iowa.

Also in 1881, its rights were granted to a new railroad organization, in a merger with the North Wisconsin Railway, to the Chicago, St. Paul, Minneapolis and Omaha Railway. This route is also currently part of the Union Pacific, and is the track from the crossing of the St. Croix River at Hudson, Wisconsin to East Minneapolis.

== See also ==
- List of Wisconsin railroads
