= Wisconsin and Calumet Railroad =

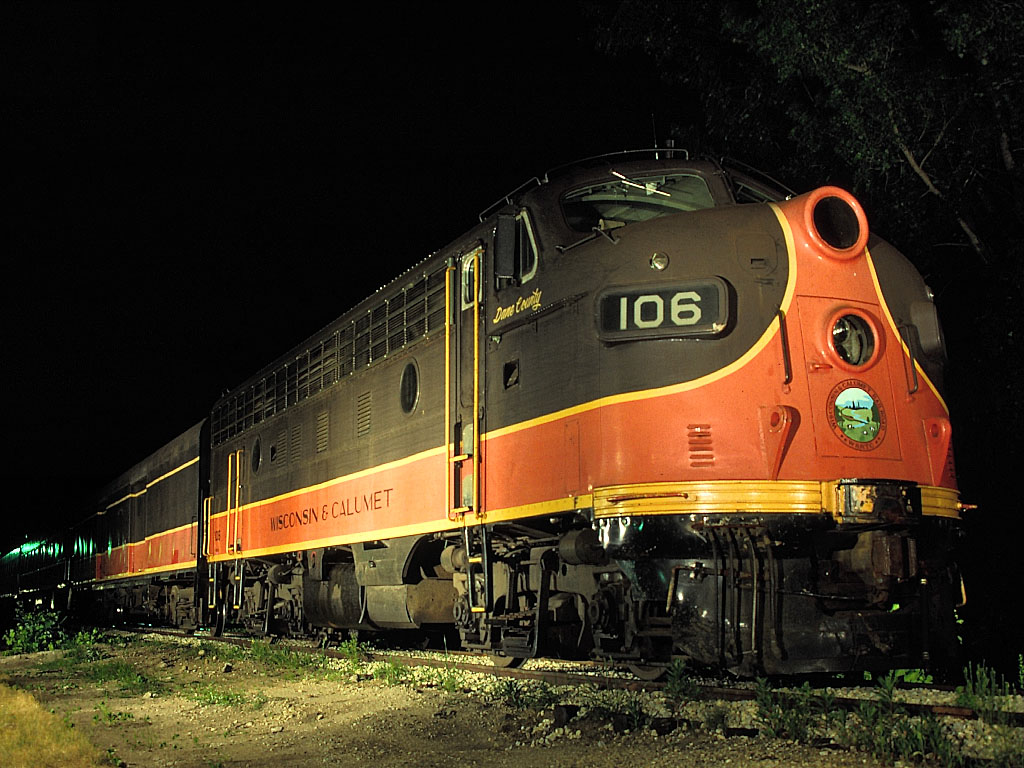
- A Wisconsin and Calumet dinner train in Fox Lake, Illinois

Overview
- Headquarters: Madison, Wisconsin
- Reporting mark: WICT
- Locale: Southern Wisconsin and Northern Illinois
- Dates of operation: 1985; 40 years ago–1997; 28 years ago
- Predecessor: Chicago, Milwaukee, St. Paul and Pacific Railroad
- Successor: Wisconsin and Southern Railroad

Technical
- Track gauge: 4 ft 8 1/2 in (1,435 mm) standard gauge

WICT 96A, an EMD FP7, approaches the W Washington Ave grade crossing in Madison with an excursion train in September 1991.

The Wisconsin and Calumet Railroad (reporting mark WICT) was a Class III shortline railroad that operated in the southern portion of Wisconsin and northern portion of Illinois from 1985 until 1997.

== History ==
In the late 1970s and early 1980s, financial difficulties forced the Chicago, Milwaukee, St. Paul and Pacific Railroad (Milwaukee Road) to abandon much of its trackage in Southern Wisconsin, including lines from Prairie du Chien to Madison, Madison to Janesville, and Janesville to Fox Lake, Illinois. At the same time, the Illinois Central Gulf Railroad abandoned its line from Madison to Freeport, Illinois. The Wisconsin Department of Transportation formed the Wisconsin River Rail Transit Commission (WRRTC) in March 1980 in the interest of preserving rail service on these lines. Two shortline operators, the Wisconsin Western Railroad (WIWR) and the affiliated Central Wisconsin Railroad (CWRC), were contracted to operate on the Prairie du Chien–Madison and Madison–Freeport lines.

These two operators filed for bankruptcy in December 1984, leaving WRRTC to find another operator. The Wisconsin and Calumet Railroad (WICT) was formed on January 1, 1985. WICT would eventually operate all of the above-mentioned rail lines, as well as lines from Janesville to Waukesha and Janesville to Monroe. In 1989, the first Wisconsin and Calumet trains ran from Janesville to Fox Lake on the route known during the Milwaukee Road era as the "J-Line". Shortly thereafter, WICT reopened the line between Janesville and Madison, bringing rail service back to Milton, Edgerton, Stoughton, and McFarland.

The Wisconsin and Calumet Railroad was purchased by William Gardner (Northern Rail Car Corporation) and was controlled by Gardner after August 1993. Gardner also acquired the Wisconsin and Southern Railroad in 1988. After Gardner obtained control of The Wisconsin and Calument in 1993, that railroad continued to operate as a subsidiary of Wisconsin and Southern until it was officially merged into WSOR in 1997.

== Timeline ==
- 1985: The Wisconsin and Calumet Railroad is formed.
- 1989: Wisconsin and Calumet begins operating the rail lines from Janesville to Fox Lake and Janesville to Madison, restoring the entire railroad connection from Chicago to the Mississippi River via Southern Wisconsin.
- 1992: The Wisconsin and Calumet Railroad is acquired by the Wisconsin and Southern Railroad.
- 1993: The former Illinois Central Railroad line from Madison, Wisconsin, to Freeport, Illinois, is embargoed and placed out of service by WICT due to unsafe conditions. Despite initial plans to restore rail service to the line, it sat abandoned and was eventually removed to make way for a bike trail in 1999.
- 1997: WICT is officially merged into the Wisconsin and Southern Railroad and ceases to exist as an employer, as ruled by the United States Railroad Retirement Board.

== The route today ==
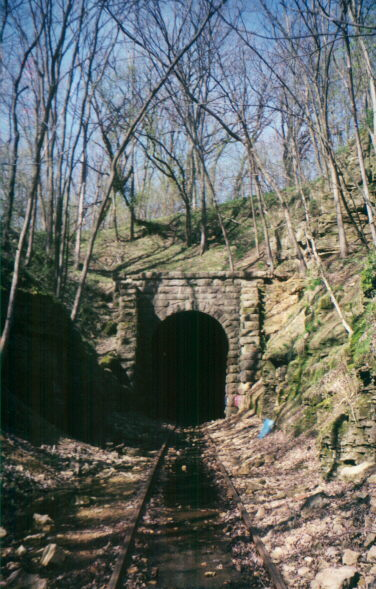
The portal of the Stewart Tunnel near Monticello in Green County, Wisconsin, shortly before the rails were removed.

Most of the rail lines operated by the Wisconsin and Calumet remain in service today under the Wisconsin and Southern Railroad, with the notable exception of the line from Madison to Freeport which was removed in 1999. The old road bed is currently occupied by the Badger State Trail between Monroe and Fitchburg and the Southwest Commuter Path from Fitchburg to downtown Madison.

== Equipment and preservation ==
The Wisconsin and Calumet Railroad's motive power primarily consisted of early generation GM-EMD Diesel-electric locomotives including the GP7, GP9, and F7. Many of these locomotives originally belonged to the Milwaukee Road. Others, including the F-units, were privately owned by an individual named Glen Monhart. WICT followed the (by then relatively unusual) practice of naming their locomotives. Several WICT locomotives were named after the counties the railroad served such as Dane County, Rock County, Walworth County, etc.

WICT EMD FP7 #96A was later repainted and renumbered to WSOR #71A and currently operates on the Escanaba and Lake Superior Railroad in Michigan and Northern Wisconsin as their #600. Several other ex-WICT F-units are stored on ELS property in Wells Township, Michigan. WICT caboose #529 (ex-Santa Fe) can be found at the Mid-Continent Railway Museum in North Freedom.

== See also ==
- List of defunct Wisconsin railroads
