= North Wisconsin Railway =

The North Wisconsin Railway was incorporated by the State of Wisconsin in 1871 to build a railroad from Lake St. Croix to Lake Superior. This route was built from Hudson, Wisconsin to Superior, Wisconsin. The route went through Spooner, Wisconsin, where the route from Chippewa Falls joined at what was then called Chicago Junction.

The North Wisconsin Railway was merged along with Chicago, St. Paul and Minneapolis Railway to become the Chicago, St. Paul, Minneapolis and Omaha Railway in 1881. That became part of the Chicago and North Western Railway, which was bought by the Union Pacific.

This route has been abandoned from Hudson to Spooner. The Wisconsin Great Northern Railroad operates seasonal tourist trains on this line to Trego, Wisconsin.

== See also ==
- List of Wisconsin railroads
