= Abbotsford and Northeastern Railroad =

Overview
- Headquarters: Milwaukee
- Locale: Wisconsin, USA
- Dates of operation: 1889–

The Abbotsford and Northeastern Railroad (A&NE) was a railroad company in Wisconsin that operated around the turn of the 20th century.

The company was organized on April 12, 1889, with headquarters in Milwaukee.

In 1899, work crews, primarily made up of factory workers from Marshfield, were out extending the line to connect Fairchild and Merrill. The work was expected to be completed by the start of winter, and speculation arose over consolidating the A&NE with the Fairchild and Northeastern Railroad. In 1902, the A&NE was assessed one of the top 15 increases in taxes over the previous year, having to pay $18.20 to the state.

The A&NE line eventually extended from Abbotsford to Athens, a distance of 15.16 miles (24.40 km).

The leadership of the railroad included:

- Fred Rietbrock - President
- L.W. Halsey - Vice president
- Thomas H. Gill - Secretary
- A.C. Rietbrock - Treasurer

The A&NE was purchased by Wisconsin Central Railway. In 1908, Wisconsin Central still held $35,000 in bonds on the A&NE.
