= Chicago, St. Paul, Minneapolis and Omaha Railway =

Defunct American railway

Chicago, St. Paul, Minneapolis and Omaha Railway "The Omaha Road"
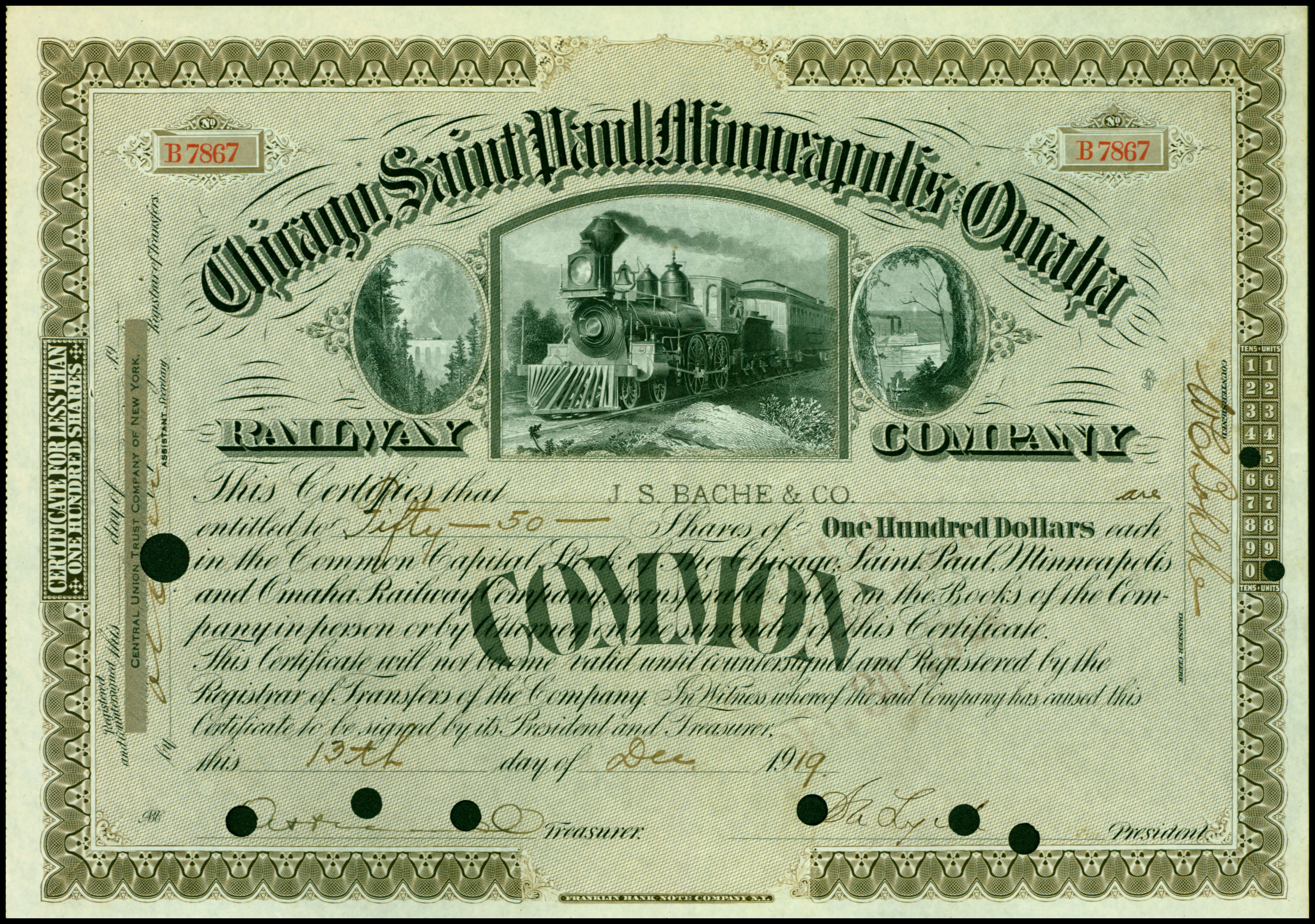
- Share of the Chicago, Saint Paul, Minneapolis and Omaha Railway Company, issued 13. December 1919

Overview
- Headquarters: St. Paul, Minnesota
- Reporting mark: CMO, CSt.PM&O
- Locale: Illinois, Iowa, Minnesota, Nebraska, South Dakota, Wisconsin
- Dates of operation: 1880–1972
- Predecessor: West Wisconsin Railway, St. Paul and Sioux City Railway
- Successor: Chicago and North Western Railway, Union Pacific Railroad

Technical
- Track gauge: 4 ft 8 1/2 in (1,435 mm)
- Length: 1,616 miles (2,601 km)

The Chicago, St. Paul, Minneapolis and Omaha Railway or Omaha Road (reporting mark CMO) was a railroad in the U.S. states of Illinois, Nebraska, Iowa, Minnesota, Wisconsin, and South Dakota. It was incorporated in 1880 as a consolidation of the Chicago, St. Paul and Minneapolis Railway and the North Wisconsin Railway. The Chicago and North Western Railway (C&NW) gained control in 1882. The C&NW leased the Omaha Road in 1957 and merged the company into itself in 1972.

Today, portions of the C. St. P. M. and O. are part of the Union Pacific Railroad network, including main lines from Wyeville, Wisconsin, to St. Paul, Minnesota, and St. Paul to Sioux City, Iowa.

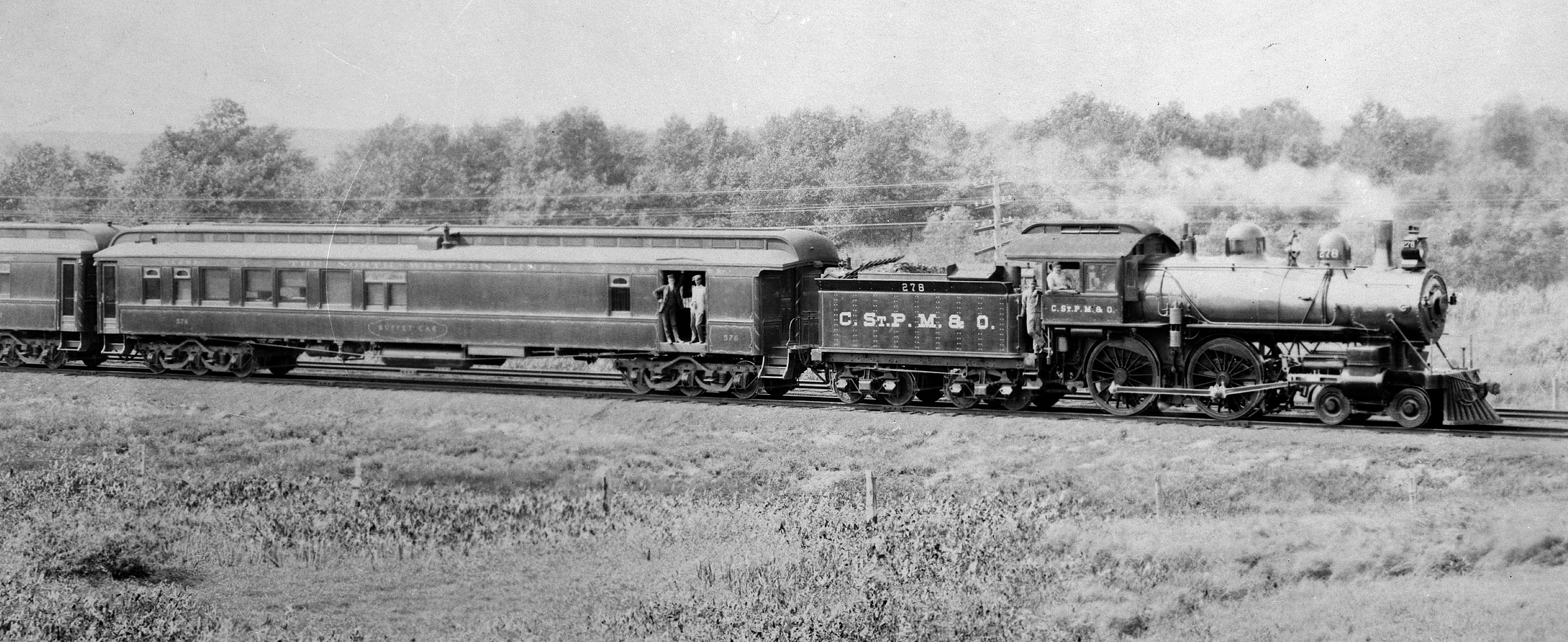
Chicago, St. Paul, Minneapolis and Omaha Railway (CStPM&O) 4-4-0 locomotive #278

== History ==
=== St. Paul to Elroy (Eastern Division) ===
The West Wisconsin Railway was authorized in 1876 to build from St. Paul to the Chicago and North Western Railway at Elroy, Wisconsin. It went bankrupt and was acquired in 1878 by the Chicago, St. Paul, and Minneapolis Railway. Its main line from the junction with the Great Northern Railway at St. Paul to Elroy, along with branches from it, became known as the C. St. P. M.'s Eastern Division.

=== St. Paul to Sioux City (Western Division) ===
The Land Grant Act of Congress approved March 3, 1857, when Minnesota was still a Territory and not a state, conferred on the then called Southern Minnesota Railroad Company "lands, interests, rights, powers and privileges" for the proposed line of railroad from St. Paul via Mankato, Minnesota, and other points named to the southern boundary of the state in the direction of the mouth of the Big Sioux river. The Minnesota Valley Railroad Company was organized in 1864 under an act of the Minnesota Legislature approved March 4, 1864. This granted to the new company the Southern Minnesota Railroad grant.

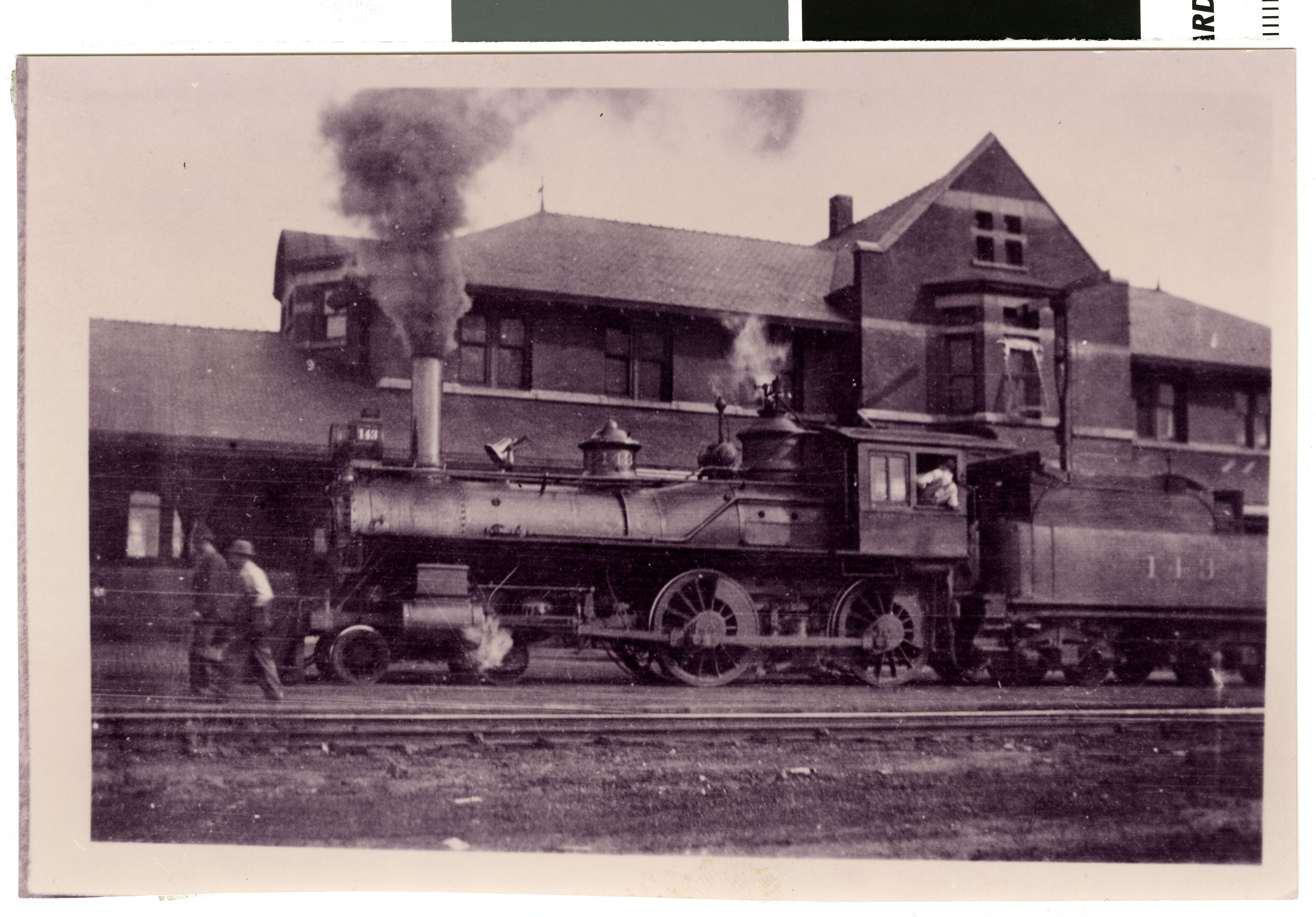
Chicago, St. Paul, Minneapolis & Omaha Railway Engine 143 at a station in Blue Earth County, Minnesota, 1923

In 1869, the Minnesota Valley Railroad and Minnesota Central Railroad Company built a bridge across the Mississippi between Mendota and St. Paul at Pickerel Lake. It was the predecessor of today's Omaha Road Bridge Number 15. A freight house was constructed in St. Paul at the foot of Robert Street. The name of the company changed on April 7, 1869, to the St. Paul and Sioux City Railroad. The railroad had reached Mankato at the bend of the Minnesota river, and left the river valley to reach Lake Crystal, Minnesota. By September 1872, the track was completed to Le Mars, Iowa, where it joined the Iowa Falls and Sioux City railroad, a predecessor of the Illinois Central Railroad. On October 1, 1872, the railroad was in regular operation from St. Paul through to Sioux City. This main line from Mendota to Le Mars became the St. Paul and Sioux City division, and eventually the Western Division.

=== Creation ===
The North Wisconsin Railway was merged along with Chicago, St. Paul and Minneapolis Railway to become the Chicago, St. Paul, Minneapolis and Omaha Railway in 1880. The C. St. P. M. & O. then purchased the St. Paul and Sioux City in 1881. The route was a bow shape between Le Mars to the Twin Cities to Elroy, Wisconsin. The railroad connected the Eastern and Western divisions through trackage leases on the Minneapolis and St. Louis at Merriam Junction to Minneapolis, the Great Northern between Minneapolis and St. Paul, and the Milwaukee Road between Mendota and St. Paul.

On Jan. 1, 1881, William Truesdale was appointed the railroad's traffic manager; he would later become the line's vice-president, and still later president of the Delaware, Lackawanna, and Western Railroad and an industry leader.

The Omaha would go on to acquire the Menomonie Railway, the Sault Ste Marie and Southwestern Railway, the Superior Short Line Railway, the Watonwan Valley Railway, the Des Moines Valley Railway, the Chippewa Valley and Northwestern Railway, and Eau Claire, Chippewa Falls, and Northeastern Railway.

=== Chicago and North Western ===
In November 1883, control passed to the Chicago and North Western Railway Company. At the end of 1956, C. St. P. M. & O. operated 1,616 miles of road and 2396 miles of track; that year, it reported 2,115 million ton-miles of revenue freight and 65 million passenger-miles.

=== Union Pacific ===
Although the CMO had long been absorbed by the C&NW before that railroad was purchased by the Union Pacific, the UP still uses the CMO reporting mark on cars. Union Pacific mainly uses the reporting mark on covered hoppers and coal hoppers.

=== Derailment ===
The Pikes Creek Tragedy was a derailment that occurred on October 2, 1884, on the Bayfield branch roughly midway between the towns of Bayfield and Washburn, Wisconsin costing the lives of 10 men and injuring several others.

== Disposition of lines ==
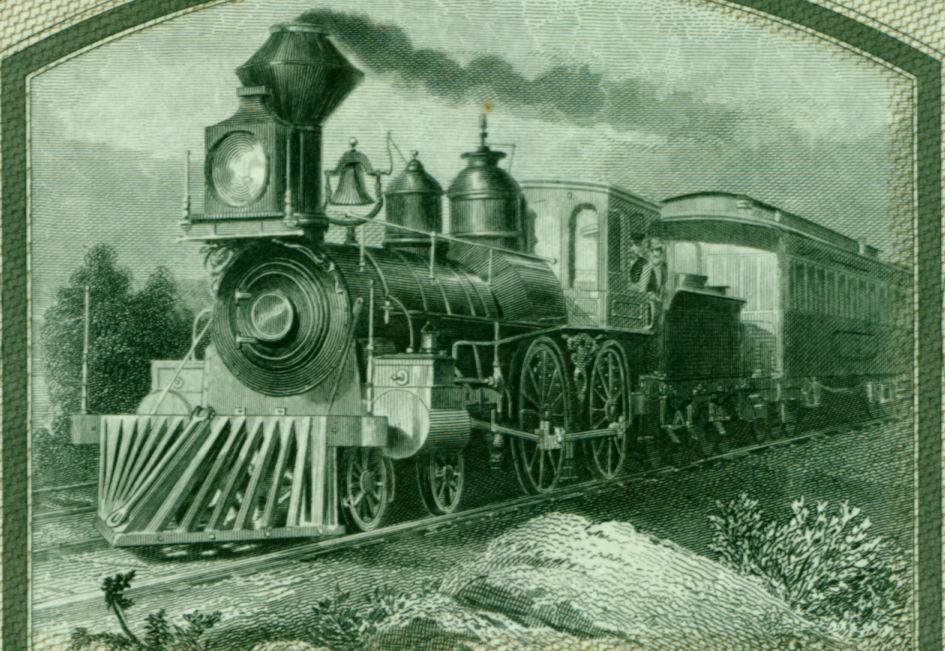
Close-up of generic 4-4-0 locomotive featured on stock certificate

The following main lines were part of the Omaha Road:

Division	Status
Eastern Division: Elroy, Wisconsin (junction with C&NW towards Chicago) to Minneapolis-St. Paul, Minnesota	Mostly part of the Union Pacific Railroad's Wyeville and Altoona Subdivisions
Northern Division: Northline (junction with Eastern Division towards Minneapolis-St. Paul) to Bayfield, Wisconsin	Abandoned
Eau Claire (Eastern Division) to Spooner, Wisconsin (Northern Division main line)	Abandoned between Spooner and Rice Lake, Wisconsin. Progressive Rail owns the line from Cameron, Wisconsin, south to Chippewa Falls, Wisconsin. Between Spooner and Trego, Wisconsin, is used by the Wisconsin Great Northern Railroad. Canadian National owns the line between Rice Lake and Cameron.
Trego, Wisconsin (Northern Division main line) to Gordon, Wisconsin	Abandoned, known as the Wild Rivers Trail
Gordon, Wisconsin (Northern Division main line) to Superior, Wisconsin	Part of Canadian National's line to Chicago. CN connects at the Itasca yard and follows the Omaha right-of-way to Gordon where it then connects to former Soo Line tracks heading South East
St. Paul and Sioux City Division: Minneapolis-St. Paul to Sioux City, Iowa	The Union Pacific Railroad's Mankato and Worthington Subdivisions
Org, Minnesota (SP&SC Division main line) to Mitchell, South Dakota	Became the Minnesota Southern Railway east of Manley and now belongs to Ellis and Eastern Company. The railroad has received funding to rebuild the line from Org, Minnesota, to Sioux Falls .
Nebraska Division: Sioux City to Omaha, Nebraska	Abandoned
