= Northwestern Union Railway =

Overview
- Dates of operation: 1871–1881
- Successor: Chicago and Milwaukee Railway

Technical
- Track gauge: 1,435 mm (4 ft 8 1/2 in)
- Length: 62.63 miles (100.79 km)

The Northwestern Union Railway was a railroad company in the United States. It was incorporated in 1871 and opened a line between Milwaukee and Fond du Lac, Wisconsin, in 1873. It was merged into the Chicago and Milwaukee Railway, a forerunner of the Chicago and North Western Railway, in 1881.

== History ==
The Milwaukee and Northwestern Railway was incorporated on February 25, 1871. The company was renamed the Northwestern Union Railway on May 3, 1872. The company's 62.63-mile (100.79 km) line between Milwaukee and Fond du Lac, Wisconsin, opened in 1873. At its southern end, the line connected with the Chicago and Milwaukee Railway's line between Chicago and Milwaukee. At the northern end in Fond du Lac, it connected with the Sheboygan and Fond du Lac Railroad's line between Sheboygan and Princeton, and the Chicago and North Western Railway's line from Chicago to Green Bay via Janesville.

The Northwestern Union Railway was consolidated with the Chicago and Milwaukee Railway on January 11, 1881, forming a new company also called the Chicago and Milwaukee Railway. That company, in turn, was consolidated with the Milwaukee and Madison Railway and the Sheboygan and Western Railway to form the Chicago, Milwaukee and North Western Railway.

== Line ==
Under the Chicago and North Western Railway the line between Milwaukee and Fond du Lac was known as the Air Line Subdivision. In railroading, a "air-line" denotes a relatively straight, direct route. During the era of Chicago and North Western passenger service it hosted Upper Peninsula-bound trains such as the Flambeau 400 and Peninsula 400.
