= Ettrick and Northern =

Railroad in Wisconsin

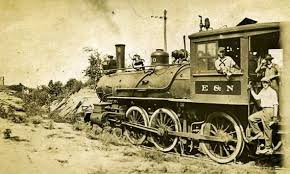
E&N No. 10, 4-6-0

The Ettrick and Northern was a railroad in southeastern Wisconsin. It was built to connect the village of Ettrick to the Green Bay and Western interchange in Blair. It lasted from 1922 to 1928, when it was bought out by locals and renamed the Ettrick Railroad Co.
