= Mineral Point Railroad =

Overview
- Dates of operation: 1852–1880
- Successor: Milwaukee Road

Technical
- Track gauge: 1,435 mm (4 ft 8 1/2 in)
- Length: 49.43 miles (79.55 km)

The Mineral Point Railroad was a railroad company in the United States. It was established in 1852 to connect Mineral Point, Wisconsin, with the Illinois Central Railroad in Warren, Illinois. Partial service began in December 1856; the full line to Mineral Point opened in June 1857. The Milwaukee Road acquired the company in 1880; the last remnant of the company's lines was abandoned in the 1980s.

== History ==
The Mineral Point Railroad was incorporated April 17, 1852, to connect Mineral Point, Wisconsin, with the developing Midwestern railroad network. Cyrus Woodman briefly served as the company's first president before being succeeded by Moses M. Strong. The company considered building toward Janesville, Wisconsin, and a connection with the Milwaukee and Mississippi Railroad (a predecessor of the Milwaukee Road). The Milwaukee and Mississippi was not interested, so the company instead decided to build south to Warren, Illinois, where it could connect with the Illinois Central Railroad.

After some difficulties, construction began in June 1856 under the supervision of Luther Beecher. The line opened between Warren and Darlington, Wisconsin, in December 1856. In 1857, Beecher succeeded Strong as company president. The line between Darlington and Mineral Point opened on June 16, 1857.

Separately, interests in Platteville, Wisconsin, organized the Dubuque, Platteville and Milwaukee Railroad. The Mineral Point Railroad constructed a 9.6-mile (15.4 km) branch line from Calamine, Wisconsin, to Belmont, Wisconsin, in 1868. The Dubuque, Platteville and Milwaukee Railroad built east from Platteville to Belmont, completing the 7.54-mile (12.13 km) line in 1870. The Mineral Point Railroad acquired the Dubuque, Platteville and Milwaukee on August 8, 1880.

The Milwaukee Road acquired the Mineral Point Railroad on September 29, 1880.

== Lines ==
The Mineral Point Railroad's original main line ran 32.29 miles (51.97 km) north–south from Warren, Illinois, to Mineral Point, Wisconsin. The Milwaukee Road's branch to Shullsburg, Wisconsin, completed in 1881, bisected the line at Gratiot, Wisconsin, and the connection to the Illinois Central at Warren gradually lessened in importance. The Milwaukee Road abandoned the line between Gratiot and Warren in 1923. The remainder, incorporated into the Mineral Point branch, was sold to the state of Wisconsin in 1980 and eventually repurposed as the Cheese Country Trail.

The branch from Calamine to Platteville, 16.9 miles (27.2 km), was abandoned in 1974.
