= Chicago and Milwaukee Railway =

Overview
- Dates of operation: 1863–1881
- Predecessors: Chicago and Milwaukee Railroad (1853–1863); Milwaukee and Chicago Railroad (1857–1863)
- Successor: Chicago and North Western Railway

Technical
- Track gauge: 1,435 mm (4 ft 8 1/2 in)
- Length: 85 miles (137 km)

The Chicago and Milwaukee Railway was a predecessor of the Chicago and North Western Railway (C&NW) in the U.S. states of Illinois and Wisconsin.

The Illinois portion was chartered on February 17, 1851, as the Illinois Parallel Railroad. Its charter permitted construction of a 44.6 mile rail line northward from Chicago through Waukegan, Illinois to Wisconsin paralleling Lake Michigan at a distance of no less than ten miles from the lake's west shore. The IPRR's board first met on September 9, 1851. On February 5, 1853, the line's name became the Chicago and Milwaukee Railroad, and construction reached Waukegan on December 19, 1854.

In a major ceremony in Kenosha, Wisconsin on Saturday May 19, 1855, the line was connected with the Green Bay, Milwaukee and Chicago Railroad (chartered March 13, 1851 in Wisconsin; renamed Milwaukee and Chicago Railroad on March 6, 1857), also exactly 44.6 miles in length. The Chicago and Milwaukee and Milwaukee and Chicago Railroads merged on June 22, 1863, to form the Chicago and Milwaukee Railway.

The Northwestern Union Railway was merged into this company on January 11, 1881, and on April 12, 1881, it merged with the Milwaukee and Madison Railway and Sheboygan and Western Railway to form the Chicago, Milwaukee and North Western Railway, which was absorbed into the C&NW in June 1883.
