= Milwaukee, Lake Shore and Western Railway =

The Milwaukee, Lake Shore and Western Railway or Lake Shore Road (reporting mark MLS&W) is a former railroad company whose mainline connected Milwaukee, the Upper Peninsula and northwest Wisconsin with connection to Chicago by way of the Chicago & North Western Railway. It was acquired by the C&NW August 19, 1893.

== History ==
The MLS&W could trace its origin to the granting of a right-of-way to the Manitowoc and Mississippi Railroad in December 1853. The MLS&W had its beginnings in 1872 with the reorganization of several predecessor roads.

- Appleton and New London Railway - Chartered April 9, 1866, to build a railroad from Appleton, Wisconsin to New London, Wisconsin.
- Milwaukee, Manitowoc & Green Bay Railroad - Chartered March 10, 1870 to build a railroad from Milwaukee to Manitowoc, Wisconsin and Green Bay, Wisconsin.
- The Vieux Desert & Lake Shore Railroad Company
- The Wolf River Railroad Company

As grading continued from Port Washington, the railroad sought to enter Milwaukee along the right bank of the Milwaukee river and use the existing Milwaukee & St. Paul Railway depot. The competitor railroad declined to permit it. A new route into Milwaukee was creatied by heading towards the Lake Michigan shore, and coming down the bluff near North Point.

By 1888, the Lake Shore was operating daily mainline passenger trains on the Milwaukee to Ashland route as well as frequent branch service to Rhinelander, Wausau, Oconto, Two Rivers and Oshkosh. Schedules indicate that almost eleven hours were required for the 367-mile Milwaukee-Ashland run.

By 1893, the MLS&W had become a major Wisconsin carrier and attracted attention from the Chicago & North Western Railway (C&NW). Since the MLS&W depended upon the C&NW for a Chicago connection as well as numerous interchange locations, it was apparent that the interests of both lines could be well served by merging the railroads. This was accomplished by September 1893. Some 733 miles of Lake Shore road as well as 112 locomotives, 77 passenger train cars, and over 5000 freight cars became the property of the C&NW.

C&NW would continue to operate the MLS&W mainline into the 20th century, however many sections were abandoned including the section from Sheboygan to Manitowoc and most of the trackage northwest of Appleton. In 1995 Union Pacific bought The Chicago & North Western Railway and today continues to operate the Chicago to Sheboygan section. The southern section of the line between Kenosha and Chicago continues to host passenger service, Metra uses the section for its commuter services on its Union Pacific North Line.
