= Fairchild and Northeastern Railroad =

Defunct railroad in Wisconsin, USA

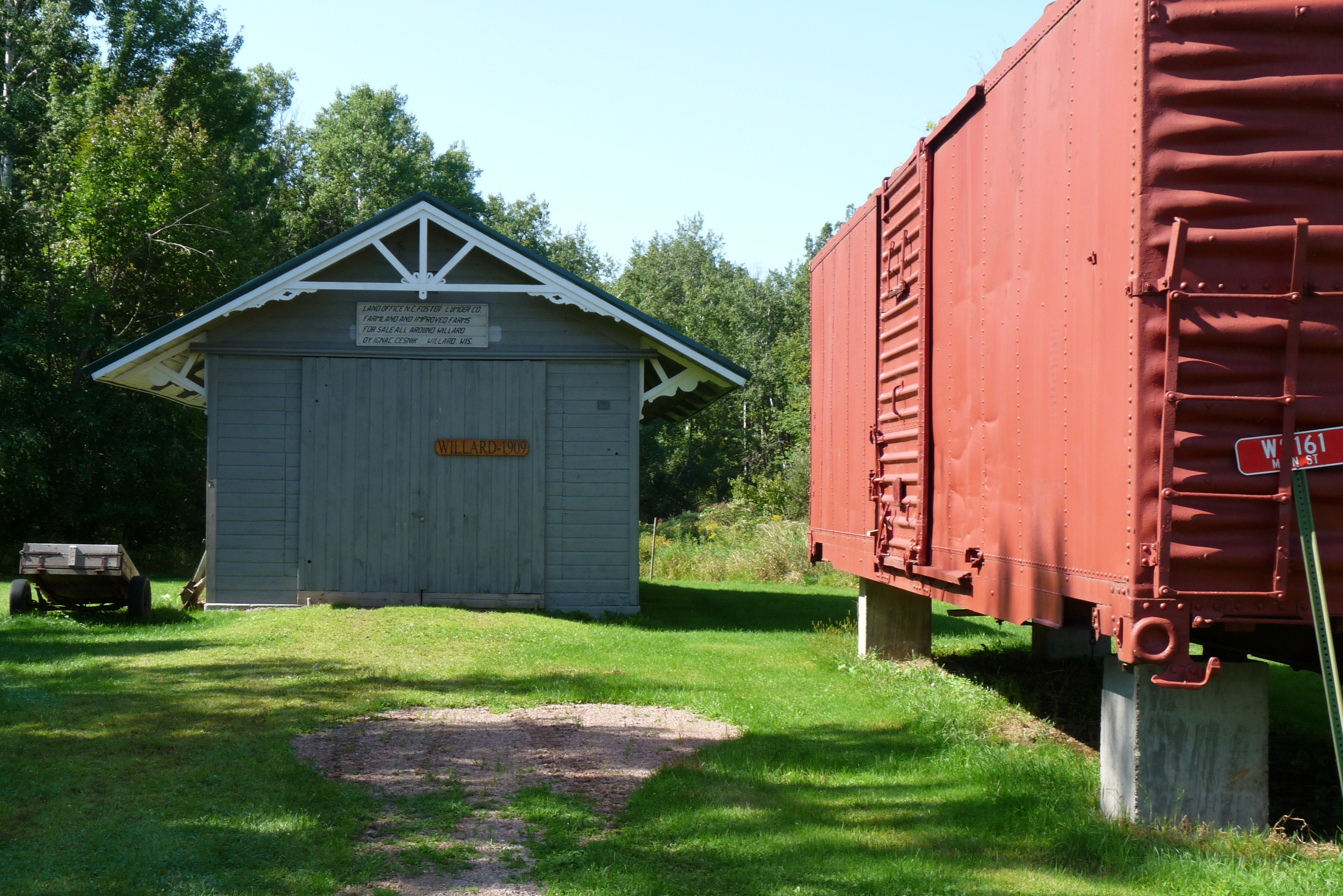
The F&NE's depot in Willard still stands.

The Fairchild and Northeastern Railroad was a common-carrier railroad organized in 1897, the successor road of several earlier logging lines of the N.C. Foster Lumber Company of Fairchild, Wisconsin. It originally connected Fairchild with Foster, via Hay Creek, in southern Eau Claire County. In 1913, the railroad was extended beyond Foster, via Allen as far as Cleghorn. To the east, it reached as far as Owen (where, as of 2006, the depot still stands and a short stub of trackage remains), via Willard and Greenwood. The railroad went defunct as a result of the Great Depression-induced change from grain farming to dairy farming as the mainstay of Wisconsin's agricultural base. A very small portion of this line was in use through the 1970s in Greenwood, where it connected with the since abandoned Greenwood branch of the Soo Line.
