= Tomahawk Railway =

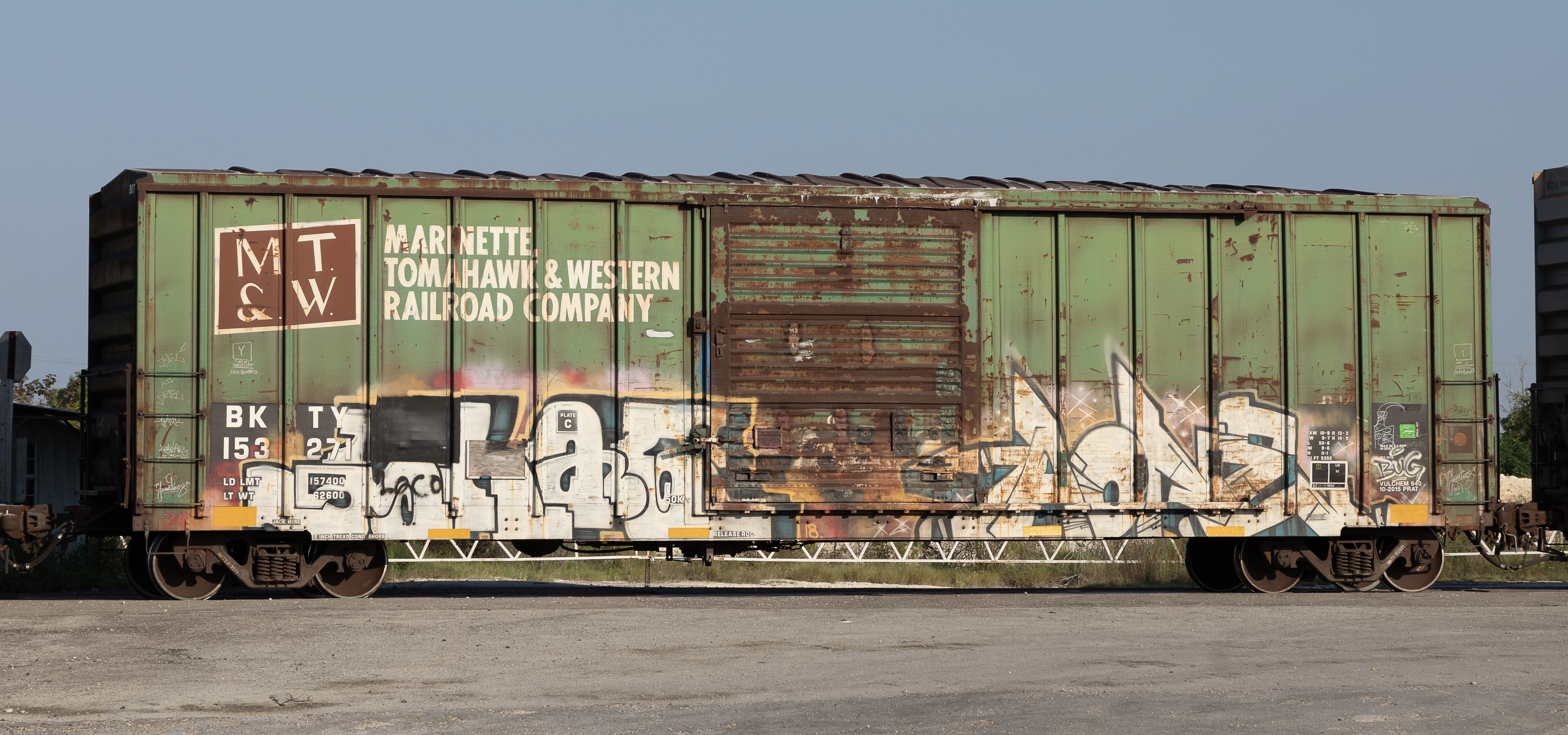
- A Marinette, Tomahawk, and Western boxcar

Overview
- Headquarters: Tomahawk, Wisconsin
- Reporting mark: TR
- Locale: Northern Wisconsin
- Dates of operation: 2005–Present

Technical
- Track gauge: 4 ft 8 1/2 in (1,435 mm) standard gauge
- Length: 6 mi (9.7 km)

The Tomahawk Railway (reporting mark TR) is the trade name employed by Genesee & Wyoming to operate 8 miles (13 km) of railroad in northern Wisconsin.

== History ==
The Tomahawk Railway, currently owned by Genesee & Wyoming has roots dating back to 1891, when the founder, William H. Bradley, organized the Wisconsin & Chippewa Railroad. In 1894, Bradley organized the Marinette, Tomahawk & Western Railway Company (MT&W), then merged the W&C into the M.T. & W. in 1898. The main purpose of the railroad was to serve the timber and paper mills in the area at that time with its connection to the world via the Milwaukee Road and Soo Line. During the 1960s, the MT&W Railroad made daily runs to Kings Dam, and an occasional run to the boat factory located where the Harley-Davidson Plant is located today. By the late 1970s, the MT&W stopped providing service to Kings Dam and used the tracks there to store boxcars. It continued to provide service to the Owens-Illinois paper mill. In 2005, Genesee & Wyoming bought the railway and renamed it the Tomahawk Railway.

== Currently ==
Currently the Tomahawk Railway operates six miles of track, providing daily service to the pulpboard mill at Wisconsin Dam, owned by Packaging Corporation of America, as well as its own 105,000-square-foot warehouse located in Tomahawk. The Tomahawk Railway handles over eight thousand carloads annually, consisting of coal, chemicals, scrap paper, woodpulp and pulpwood inbound, as well as pulpboard outbound from Wisconsin Dam to its connection with Fox Valley & Lake Superior Railroad at Tomahawk. Tomahawk Railway has one interchange at Fox Valley, Wisconsin and Lake Superior at Tomahawk, Wisconsin. It can hold up to 263,000 pounds of supplies.

== Roster ==
- 1583 (Ex-83) EMD SW1500
- 1587 (Ex-87) EMD SW1500
