= Progressive Rail, Inc. =

American shortline railroad owner

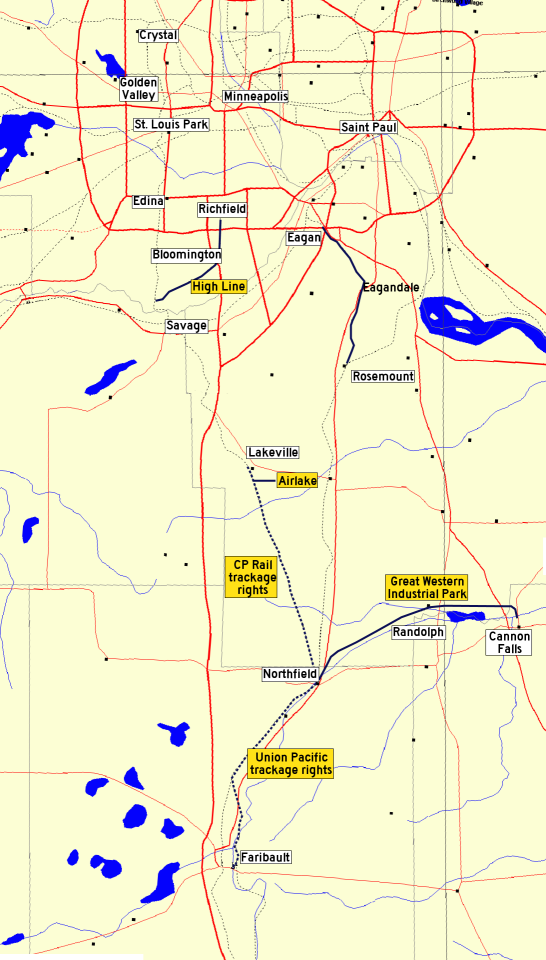

Overview
- Headquarters: Lakeville, Minnesota
- Reporting mark: PGR
- Locale: Minnesota; Wisconsin; Iowa; Illinois; California; Oregon
- Dates of operation: 1998–present

Technical
- Track gauge: 4 ft 8 1/2 in (1,435 mm) standard gauge

Other
- Website: Progressive Rail, Inc. Progressive Rail Specialized Logistics

Progressive Rail Inc. (reporting mark PGR) is a shortline railroad and owner of several other shortlines. PGR is directly operating several separate branches in Minnesota including the Airlake Terminal Railway. Progressive Rail also acquired the Wisconsin Northern Division in Chippewa Falls, Wisconsin and operates as a separately-named division. They also own the Chicago Junction Railroad, Clackamas Valley Railway (reporting mark CVLY), the Iowa Traction Railway and Iowa Southern Railway (reporting mark ISRY) in Iowa, the Crab Orchard and Egyptian Railroad in Illinois, the St. Paul & Pacific Northwest Railroad (reporting mark STPP), and the Wisconsin Northern Railroad.

Progressive Rail is also known as the Cannon Valley Railroad (reporting mark CVRC).

The PGR branches are listed as follows:

- Transload Industrial Park (Airlake Terminal Railway) - Lakeville, Minnesota
- The "High Line" (a.k.a. Dan Patch Line) - Bloomington, Minnesota, Richfield, Minnesota, and Minneapolis, Minnesota. Service begins at Auto Club Yard in Bloomington and serves a variety of industries. Interchanges with the CPKC MN&S Subdivision at Nesbitt Yard in west Bloomington.
- The "Jesse James Line" - Northfield to Lakeville, leased CP Rail trackage
- Northfield to Faribault, Minnesota via leased Union Pacific and CP Rail trackage
- Northfield to Cannon Falls, Minnesota, with service to the Great Western Industrial Park in Randolph, Minnesota.
- Eagandale Industrial line (Eagan, Minnesota) via leased CP Rail trackage (former Milwaukee Road)
- Santa Cruz Branch - Davenport to Watsonville, California (operating with the Santa Cruz, Big Trees, and Pacific Railway as a subcontractor)

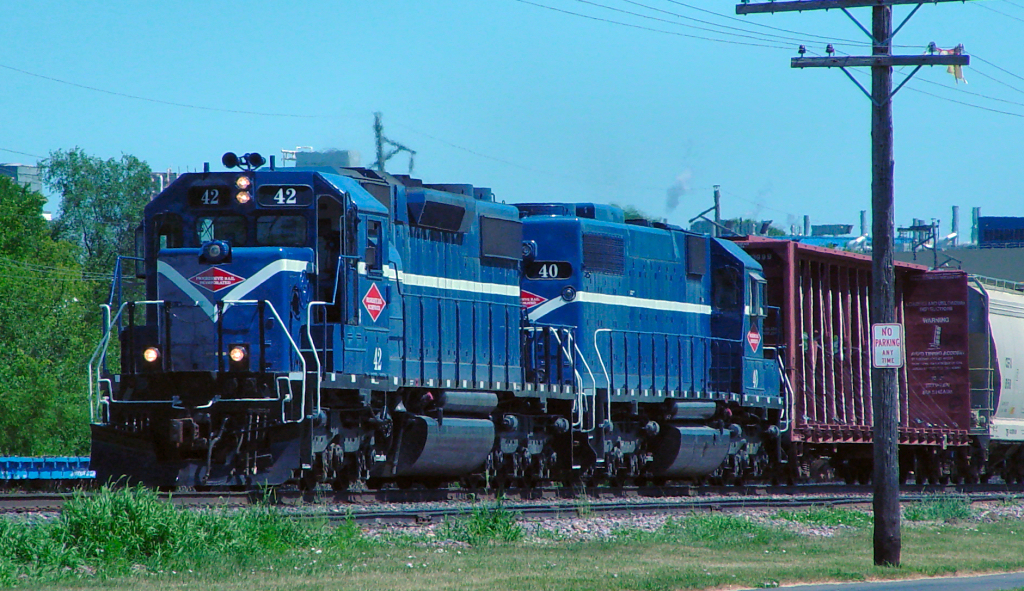
Progressive Rail train in Northfield, Minnesota

== History ==
Headquartered in Lakeville, Minnesota (a southern suburb of Minneapolis-St. Paul), Progressive Rail, Inc. was established in 1996 to initially serve the Airlake Industrial Park. In 2001, they leased the former Minneapolis, Northfield and Southern Railway "High Line" in Bloomington and Richfield and started restoring trackage. The company's philosophy has been to provide service that a large railway chooses not to provide. They have also focused on economic development, including finding new customers, and working on regaining former rail customers along their lines. This strategy has paid off in an increase in traffic, from 600 carloads in their first year of operation to more than 5000 carloads in 2003.

Major commodities include resins, chemicals, fuels, lumber, gypsum board, cement, fly-ash, metals, paper, machinery, food and kindred products, scrap material, and consumer products.

Progressive Rail, Inc. also operates wholly owned subsidiary Progressive Rail Specialized Logistics, which provides rail logistics services for machinery and over-dimensional freight shippers.

== Locomotive roster ==
Locomotive model	Road number
EMD SW1500	34
EMD SW1500	36
EMD SW1500	37
EMD SW1500	38
EMD SW1500	67
EMD SW1500	74
EMD SW1500	2347
EMD SD39	40
EMD SD40-2	41
EMD SD40-2	43
EMD SD38-2	42
EMD GP15-1	1500
EMD GP15-1	1501
EMD GP40-2	6211
