= Rice Lake, Dallas and Menomonie Railway =

Railway company

Overview
- Headquarters: Rice Lake, Wisconsin
- Locale: Wisconsin, United States
- Dates of operation: 1893–1900
- Successor: Soo Line

Technical
- Track gauge: 4 ft 8 1/2 in (1,435 mm)

The Rice Lake, Dallas and Menomonie Railway (RLD&M) was a railroad company based in Wisconsin, United States. It was known locally as "the Blueberry Line" due to the abundance of blueberries along its route.

The RLD&M was chartered on February 9, 1893, and built a 7.52-mile-long (12.10 km) connection from Rice Lake to Cameron; construction began on October 16, and the line began operations on February 22, 1894. In the Summer of 1899, surveyors began work to extend the line from Cameron to Menomonie, with the first surveys taking place on August 23. Construction continued through Barron in 1900 such that by the end of the year, a second line connecting Barron and Ridgeland was completed. Ridgeland was as far south as the RLD&M was to reach before its absorption. The RLD&M was purchased by the Soo Line in 1900, then was fully absorbed by 1901.

The railroad's president was George Fuller, vice president was George Morehouse Huss and secretary and treasurer was J.E. Horsman.
