= Wyeville Subdivision =

Railway line in Wisconsin

Overview
- Status: Active
- Owner: Union Pacific Railroad
- Locale: Wisconsin
- Termini: Altoona; Wyeville

Service
- Type: Freight
- Operator(s): Union Pacific Railroad

History
- Commenced: 1868
- Completed: 1872

Technical
- Line length: 82.8 mi (133.3 km)
- Number of tracks: 1–2
- Track gauge: 4 ft 8 1/2 in (1,435 mm) standard gauge

The Wyeville Subdivision or Wyeville Sub is an 82.8-mile (133.3 km) railway line owned and operated by the Union Pacific Railroad. It meets the Altoona Subdivision to the west in Altoona, Wisconsin and runs to Wyeville, Wisconsin to the east where it connects with the Adams Subdivision. Construction began in 1868 by the West Wisconsin Railway and was completed in 1872. The line then became part of the Chicago, St. Paul, Minneapolis and Omaha Railway in 1878; the Chicago and North Western Railway acquired control of this road in 1882. The CNW then became part of UP in 1995.

The last passenger train to run on the line was the CNW's Twin Cities 400, which operated from 1935 to its discontinuation in 1963. In July 2019, Union Pacific 4014, a 4-8-8-4 Big Boy type steam locomotive, ran on the line as part of the "Great Race Across the Midwest" excursion.
