= Hudson (town), Wisconsin =

Hudson, Wisconsin
- town
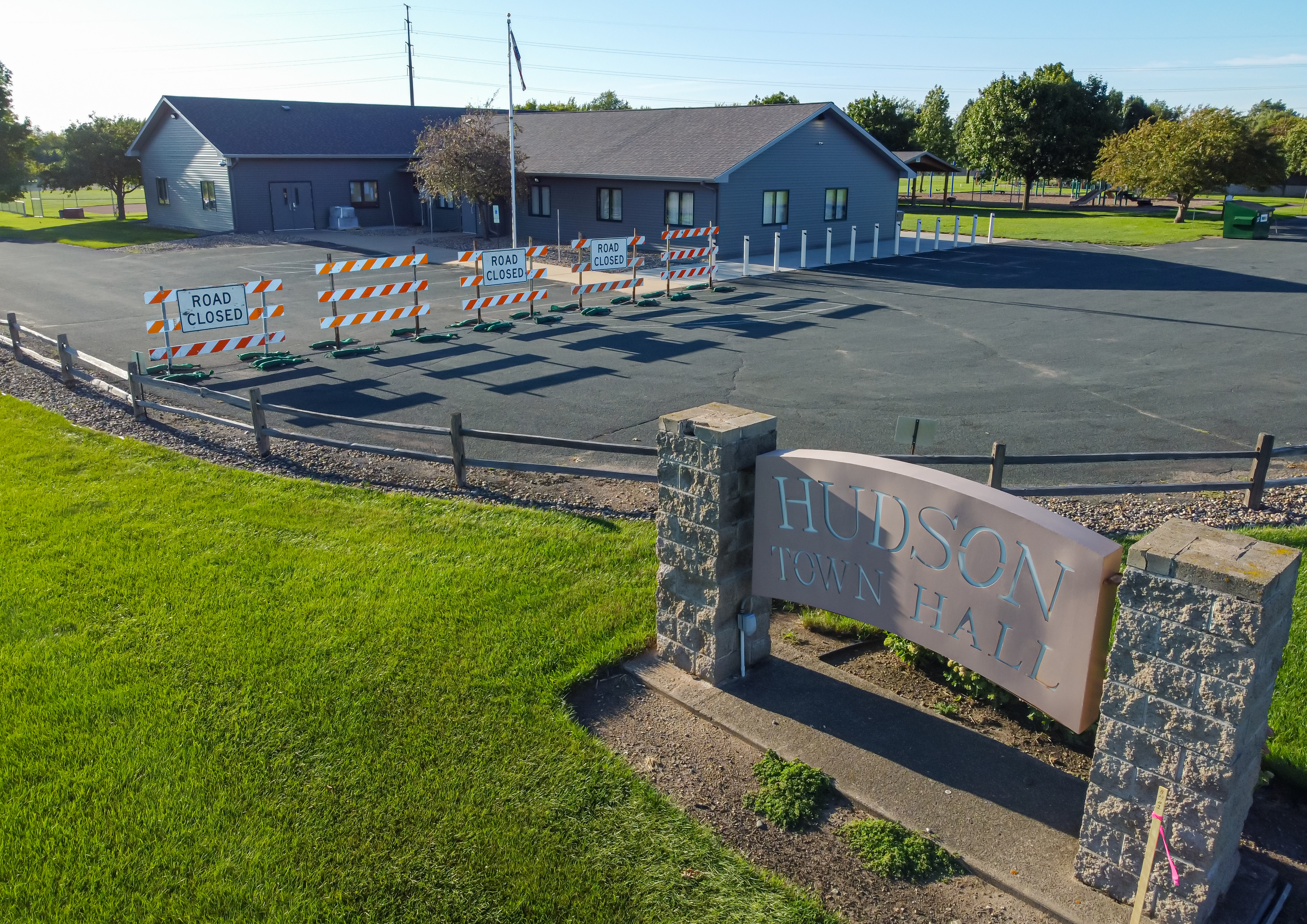
- Town hall

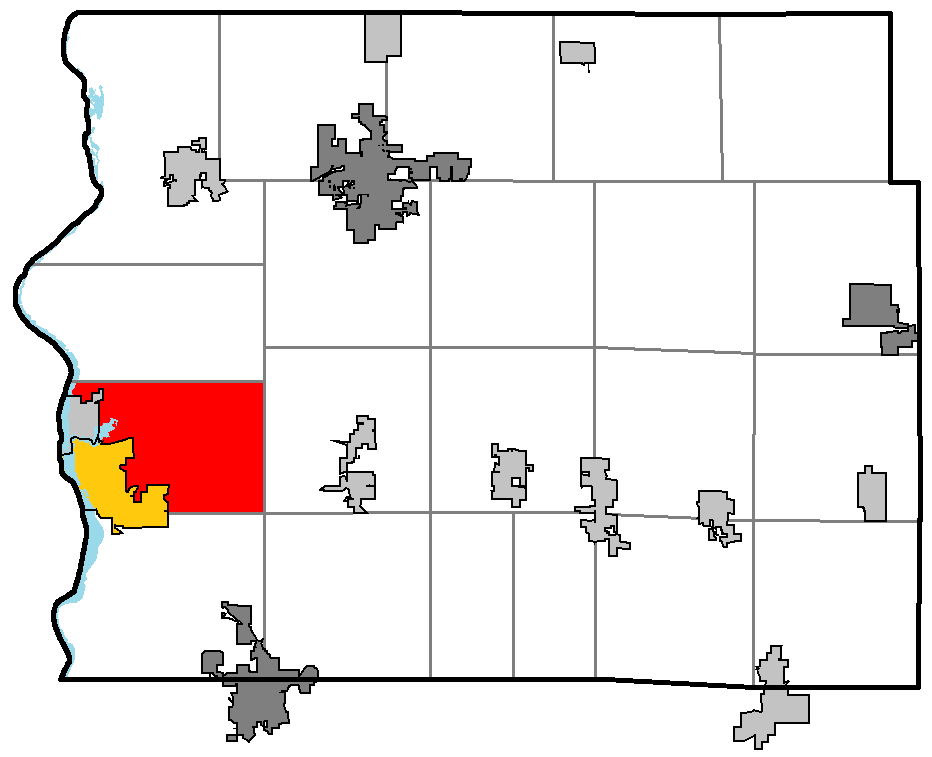
- Location of Hudson, within St. Croix County

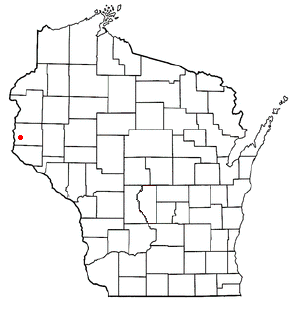
- Location of Hudson (town), Wisconsin
- Coordinates: 44°59′27″N 92°41′49″W
- Country: United States
- State: Wisconsin
- County: St. Croix

Area
  - Total: 26.4 sq mi (68.5 km^{2})
  - Land: 25.9 sq mi (67.0 km^{2})
  - Water: 0.58 sq mi (1.5 km^{2})
- Elevation: 920 ft (280 m)

Population (2020)
  - Total: 8,671
  - Density: 335/sq mi (129/km^{2})
- Time zone: UTC-6 (Central (CST))
  - Summer (DST): UTC-5 (CDT)
- Area codes: 715 & 534
- FIPS code: 55-36275
- GNIS feature ID: 1583418
- Website: http://www.townofhudsonwi.com/

Hudson is a town in St. Croix County, Wisconsin, United States. The population was 8,671 at the 2020 census. The City of Hudson is located within the town. The unincorporated communities of Burkhardt Station, Northline, and Sono Junction are also located in the town.

== Geography ==
According to the United States Census Bureau, the town has a total area of 26.5 square miles (68.5 km^{2}), of which 25.9 square miles (67.0 km^{2}) is land and 0.6 square mile (1.5 km^{2}) (2.15%) is water.

== Demographics ==
Historical population
Census	Pop.	Note	%±
2010	8,461		—
2020	8,671		2.5%

As of the census of 2000, there were 6,213 people, 1,925 households, and 1,697 families residing in the town. The population density was 240.1 inhabitants per square mile (92.7/km^{2}). There were 1,962 housing units at an average density of 75.8 per square mile (29.3/km^{2}). The racial makeup of the town was 97.70% White, 0.34% Black or African American, 0.21% Native American, 0.95% Asian, 0.02% Pacific Islander, 0.31% from other races, and 0.48% from two or more races. 0.98% of the population were Hispanic or Latino of any race.

There were 1,925 households, out of which 52.8% had children under the age of 18 living with them, 81.7% were married couples living together, 4.3% had a female householder with no husband present, and 11.8% were non-families. 7.5% of all households were made up of individuals, and 1.4% had someone living alone who was 65 years of age or older. The average household size was 3.17 and the average family size was 3.36.

In the town, the population was spread out, with 33.2% under the age of 18, 6.0% from 18 to 24, 34.3% from 25 to 44, 23.8% from 45 to 64, and 2.8% who were 65 years of age or older. The median age was 34 years. For every 100 females, there were 105.4 males. For every 100 females age 18 and over, there were 104.6 males.

The median income for a household in the town was $81,733, and the median income for a family was $83,418. Males had a median income of $54,821 versus $32,719 for females. The per capita income for the town was $29,424. About 0.8% of families and 1.4% of the population were below the poverty line, including 2.0% of those under age 18 and none of those age 65 or over.

== Notable people ==
- Guy Dailey, farmer, town chairman, and state legislator from St. Croix County
