= Union Pacific 4141 =

EMD SD70ACe diesel locomotive

Coordinates: 30°35′48″N 96°21′12″W

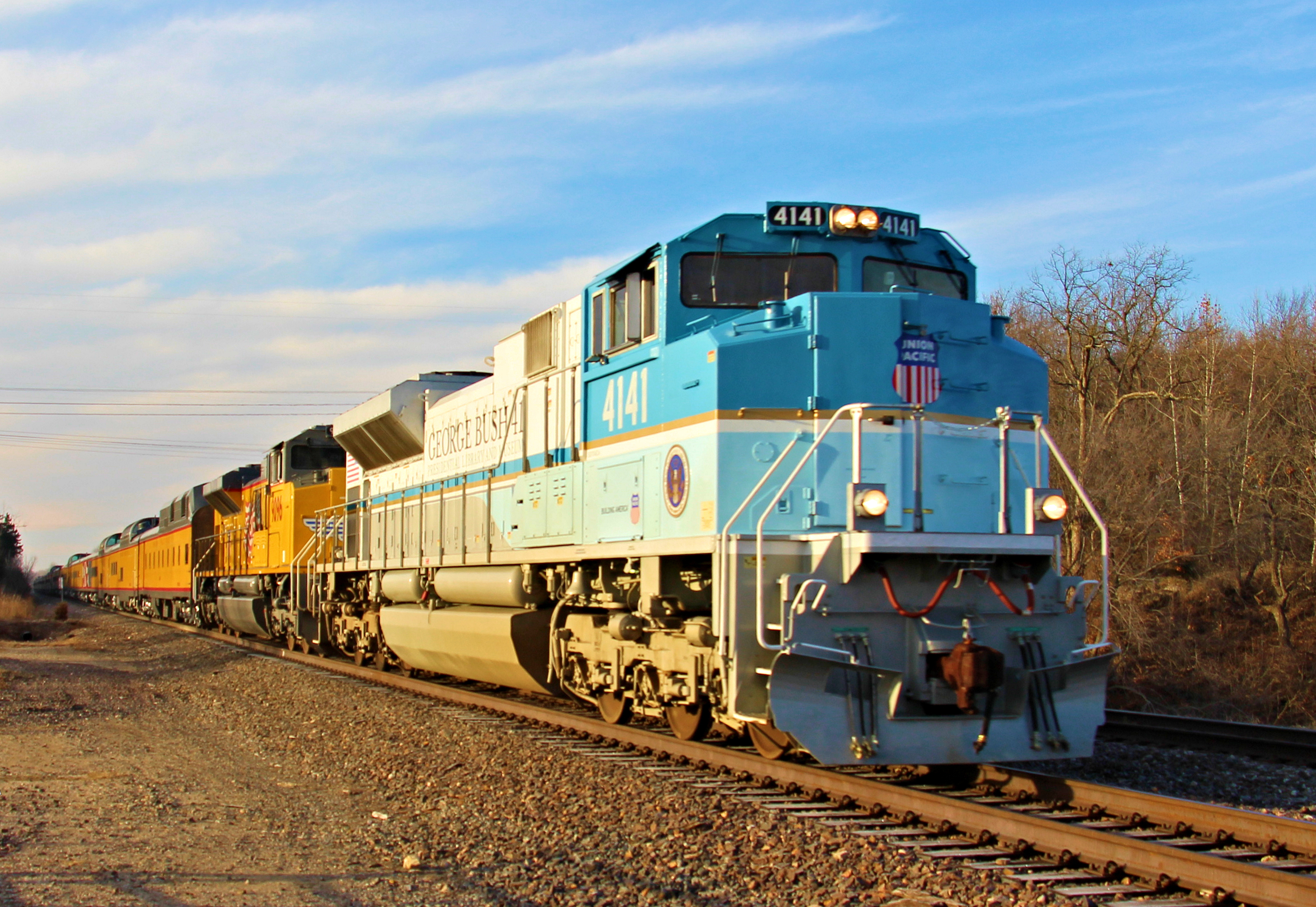
- 4141 pulls the Bush Funeral train in December 2018
Type and origin
- Builder: EMD
- Order number: 20046610
- Serial number: 20046610-115
- Model: SD70ACe
- Build date: July 2005
Specifications
- Configuration
  - AAR: C-C
- Gauge: 4 ft 8 1/2 in (1,435 mm) standard gauge
- Trucks: EMD HTCR-6
- Prime mover: EMD 16-710-G3 2-stroke diesel
- Engine type: V16
- Cylinders: 16
- Transmission: Diesel electric
Career
- Operators: Union Pacific
- Numbers: 4141
- Delivered: 2005
- First run: 2005
- Last run: November 9, 2019
- Retired: 2019
- Current owner: George H.W. Bush Presidential Library and Museum
- Disposition: On static display

Union Pacific 4141 is an EMD SD70ACe diesel locomotive painted in honor of George H. W. Bush, the 41st President of the United States. Its paint scheme is based on that of Air Force One, with lettering reading "George Bush 41".

Built in 2005 for the Union Pacific Railroad, it was initially operated as UP 8423 until October 18, 2005, when it was unveiled at the George H.W. Bush Presidential Library and Museum. As the 4141, the locomotive was in active service until 2007–2008, when the 2008 financial crisis forced the locomotive to be stored indefinitely in North Little Rock, AR. Except for a brief run in 2012, it would not run again until December 6, 2018, when the locomotive led Bush's funeral train. It would then return to active service until being donated to the Bush Presidential Library on November 8, 2019; it made its final run on November 9, 2019, and returned to the library on March 12, 2021, where it is now on permanent display.

== History ==
The locomotive entered service with Union Pacific as 8423 in 2005, initially entering service in primer paint, similar to the six heritage units before they were unveiled in their respective paint schemes. On October 18, 2005, the locomotive was officially unveiled at the George H.W. Bush Presidential Library and Museum with a paint scheme is based on that of Air Force One, with lettering reading "George Bush 41". Union Pacific road number 4141 was previously occupied by an EMD SD70M, which was renumbered 3778. The locomotive was displayed outside the Presidential Library for a while before it entered revenue service. Bush himself was allowed to operate the locomotive briefly.

The unit was removed from active service in 2009 and placed in storage at UP's North Little Rock shop when traffic fell after the 2008 financial crisis and the Great Recession. In 2012, the locomotive was removed from storage for a single round trip from North Little Rock to Chicago, then returned to storage. For a while, it was wrapped for long-term storage, but the wrapping was later removed.

After Bush died on November 30, 2018, UP 4141 was brought out of storage and sent to Houston, Texas, on December 1, 2018. The locomotive participated in Bush's funeral train on December 6, running from Spring to College Station, Texas. After the funeral, the unit was sent to Omaha, Nebraska, where it was displayed from December 9 to 12. UP 4141 later went on a system-wide tour, with stops in Chicago, Fort Worth, Houston, Kansas City, Los Angeles, North Platte, Pine Bluff, North Little Rock, Ogden, Portland, Roseville and St Louis. Following the tour, it returned to active service, in addition to being on display in other locations.

On November 8, 2019, Union Pacific donated the 4141 to the George H.W. Bush Presidential Library and Museum, where it would be on permanent display in the pavilion. The locomotive made its last run from November 8 to 9, traveling from Houston to Palestine, Texas as part of the Southwest tour of the recently restored Union Pacific Big Boy No. 4014. Following its last run, it was taken back to the North Little Rock shops to be prepped for display. On March 12, 2021, the locomotive arrived back at College Station. The Marine One/4141 Locomotive Pavilion was opened on June 13, 2024, in time for George H. W. Bush's 100th birthday.
