= Northline, Wisconsin =

- Unincorporated community
- Location within Wisconsin Location within the United States
- Coordinates: 44°59′21″N 92°42′55″W
- Country: United States
- State: Wisconsin
- County: St. Croix
- Elevation: 860 ft (260 m)
- Time zone: UTC-6 (Central (CST))
  - Summer (DST): UTC-5 (CDT)
- Area codes: 715 & 534
- GNIS feature ID: 1581686

Northline is an unincorporated community located in the town of Hudson, St. Croix County, Wisconsin, United States.

== History ==
Northline was originally called North Wisconsin Junction, until 1906 when the present name was adopted. A post office called North Wisconsin Junction was in operation from 1878 until 1884. Northline was named from the fact that from this point a branch of the railroad headed for Northern Wisconsin.
