= Adams Subdivision =

Railway line in Wisconsin

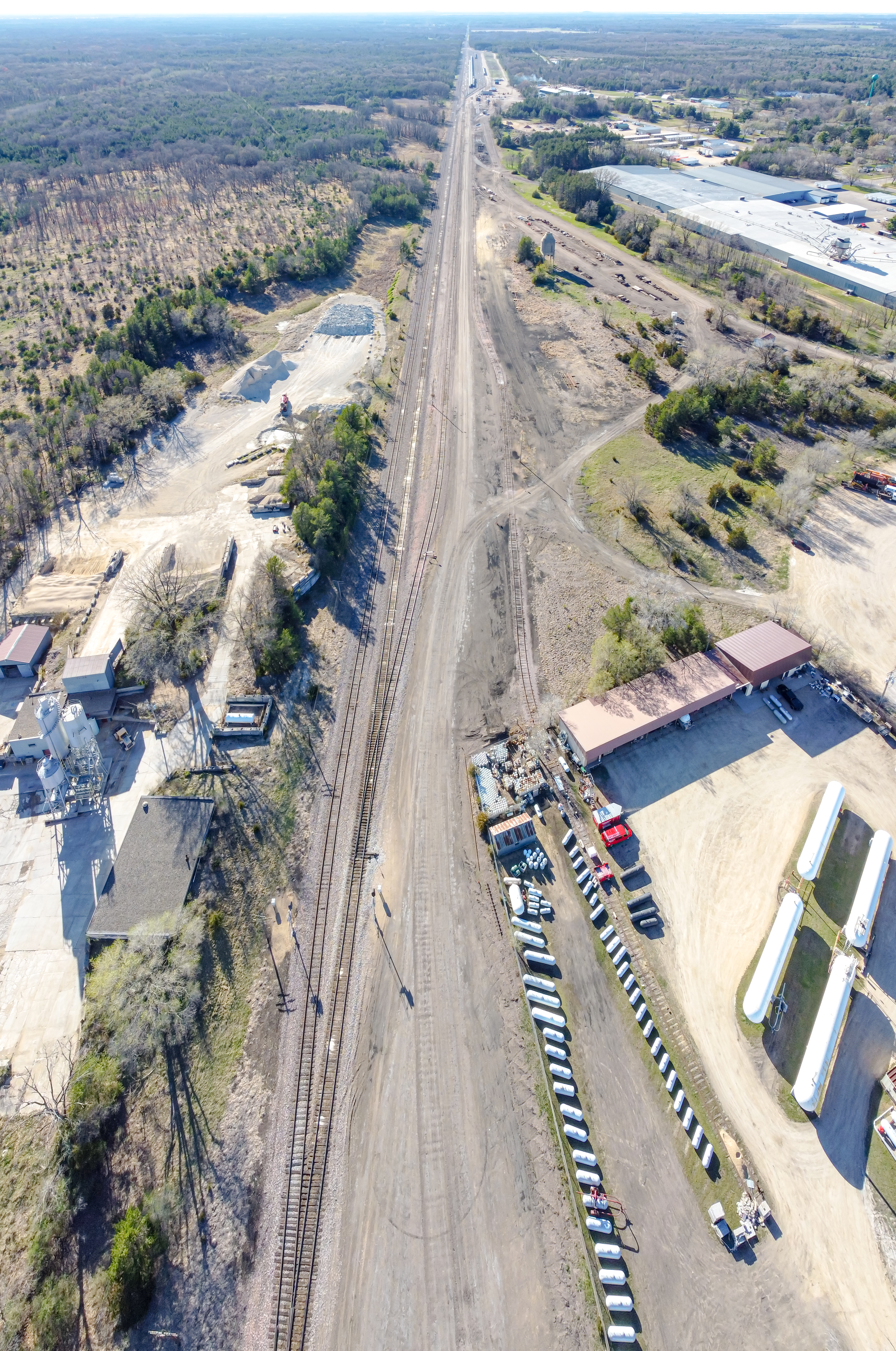
- Adams Subdivision by Adams, Wisconsin

Overview
- Status: Active
- Owner: Union Pacific Railroad
- Locale: Wisconsin
- Termini: Wyeville; Butler

Service
- Type: Freight
- Operator(s): Union Pacific Railroad

History
- Completed: 1911

Technical
- Line length: 139.2 mi (224.0 km)
- Number of tracks: 1–2
- Track gauge: 4 ft 8 1/2 in (1,435 mm) standard gauge

The Adams Subdivision or Adams Sub is a 139.2-mile (224.0 km) railway line owned and operated by the Union Pacific Railroad. It meets the Wyeville Subdivision to the west in Wyeville, Wisconsin, and runs to Butler, Wisconsin in the east where it meets the Milwaukee Subdivision. It was constructed in 1911 by the Chicago and North Western Railway. The Milwaukee, Sparta, and Northwestern Railroad, a subsidiary of the Chicago and North Western Railway, began the "Air Line" or "Adams Cutoff" from Adams, Wisconsin towards Sparta, Wisconsin in 1910. The Adams Cutoff avoided the steep grades of the Elroy to Sparta cutoff on the route from Madison, Wisconsin.

The Twin Cities 400 ran on the Adams Subdivision from its creation in 1935 to its discontinuation in 1963, and was the last routinely operated passenger train to run on the line. In July 2019, an excursion train ran on the Adams Subdivision as part of the "Great Race Across the Midwest" celebratory tour. The train was led by Union Pacific 4014, a 4-8-8-4 Big Boy type steam locomotive.
