= Sono Junction, Wisconsin =

- Unincorporated community
- Location within Wisconsin Location within the United States
- Coordinates: 44°59′22″N 92°40′44″W
- Country: United States
- State: Wisconsin
- County: St. Croix
- Elevation: 922 ft (281 m)
- Time zone: UTC-6 (Central (CST))
  - Summer (DST): UTC-5 (CDT)
- Area codes: 715 & 534
- GNIS feature ID: 1581725

Sono Junction is an unincorporated community located in the town of Hudson, St. Croix County, Wisconsin, United States. Sono Junction is located at the junction of U.S. Route 12 and County Highway U along the Union Pacific Railroad's Altoona Subdivision, 4 miles (6.4 km) east-northeast of the city of Hudson.
