= West Wisconsin Railway =

Railroad in Wisconsin

The West Wisconsin Railway was a small railroad in Wisconsin, connecting the Chicago and North Western Railway at Elroy, Wisconsin to Hudson, Wisconsin. It became part of the Chicago, St. Paul, Minneapolis and Omaha Railway ("Omaha Road"). This Omaha Road merged into the Chicago and North Western Railway. Today some of its route is still active as Union Pacific's Altoona Subdivision between Saint Paul and Altoona, Wisconsin.

An 1871 proposal map shows the route from Saint Paul joining the Milwaukee and St. Paul Railroad at Tomah, Wisconsin. The West Wisconsin Railway was authorized in 1876 to build from St. Paul, Minnesota through to reach the Chicago and North Western Railway at Elroy, Wisconsin. It crossed the Milwaukee Road at Camp Douglas, instead of Tomah. In 1878 the bankrupt West Wisconsin Railway was acquired by the Chicago, St. Paul, Minneapolis and Omaha Railway.
