= EMD SD70 series =

North American diesel–electric locomotive class

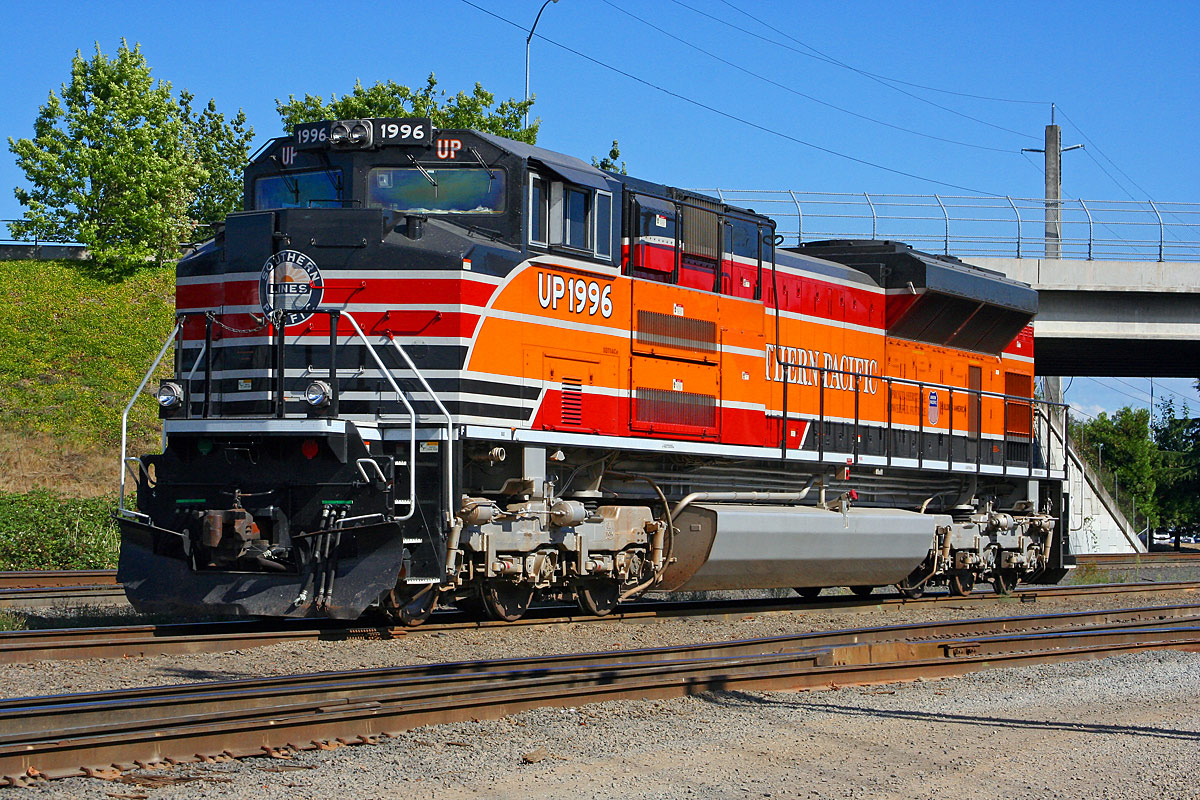
- UP 1996, an SD70ACe wearing a Southern Pacific Railroad heritage livery
Type and origin
- Power type: Diesel-electric
- Builder: Electro-Motive Diesel (EMD)
- Model: SD70, SD70I, SD70M, SD70M-2, SD70AC, SD70MAC, SD70ACe, SD70ACe/LCi, SD70ACS, SD70ACe-T4, SD70ACe-BB, SD70ACe/45, SD70IAC, SD70ACe/LW, SD70ACe-P4, SD70ACe-P6, SD70ACU, SD70ACC, SD70MACH, SD70MACe, SD70H
- Build date: 1992–present
- Total produced: SD70: 122; SD70I: 26; SD70M: 1,758; SD70M-2: 363; SD70MAC: 1,154; SD70ACe: 2,134; SD70ACe/lc: 205; SD70ACS: 86; SD70ACe-P4: 80; SD70ACe-P6: 50; SD70ACe-T4: 176; SD70ACe-BB: 64; SD70ACe/45: 537
Specifications
- Configuration
  - AAR: C-C (B+B-B+B for SD70ACe-BB, B1-1B for SD70ACe-P4 and SD70MACH)
  - UIC: Co'Co' (Bo'Bo'Bo'Bo' for SD70ACe-BB, Bo1’1Bo’ for SD70ACe-P4 and SD70MACH)
  - Commonwealth: Co-Co (Bo+Bo-Bo+Bo for SD70ACe-BB, Bo1-1Bo for SD70ACe-P4 and SD70MACH)
- Gauge: 4 ft 8 1/2 in (1,435 mm) standard gauge for the North American market; 1,520 mm (4 ft 11 27/32 in) for Yakutia; 1,600 mm (5 ft 3 in) for Brazil; 1,000 mm (3 ft 3 3/8 in) for Brazil and Guinea
- Trucks: EMD HTCR-Ia: SD70, SD70I, SD70M, SD70MAC; EMD HTCR-Ib: SD70I, SD70M, SD70MAC, SD70ACU; EMD HTCR-4: SD70M, SD70MAC, SD70ACe; EMD HTCR-6: SD70ACe, SD70ACe-T4; EMD HTSC-II: SD70M, SD70ACe, SD70ACe/LCi, SD70ACS, SD70ACe/45; EMD GBB: SD70ACe-BB
- Prime mover: EMD 16-710G3 2-stroke diesel; EMD 12-1010J 4-stroke diesel for SD70ACe-T4
- Engine type: V16; V12 for SD70ACe-T4
- Cylinders: 16; 12 for SD70ACe-T4
- Transmission: Diesel electric
Performance figures
- Maximum speed: 70 mph (110 km/h), 75 mph (121 km/h) for the SD70ACe-T4
Career
- Nicknames: Vacuum Cleaners (SD70ACe-T4) Thundercabs (Early SD70ACe models)
- Locale: North America, Brazil, Peru, Guinea, Mauritania, Saudi Arabia, United Arab Emirates
- Disposition: Many operational, several retired due to wrecks, two preserved (one SD70ACe and one SD70MAC).

The EMD SD70 is a series of diesel-electric locomotives manufactured by Electro-Motive Diesel. This locomotive family is an extension and improvement of the EMD SD60 series. Production commenced in late 1992 and since then over 5,700 units have been produced; most of these are the SD70M, SD70MAC, and SD70ACe models. While the majority of the production was ordered for use in North America, various models of the series have been used worldwide. All locomotives of this series are hood units with C-C trucks, except the SD70ACe-P4 and SD70MACH which have a B1-1B wheel configuration, and the SD70ACe-BB, which has a B+B-B+B wheel arrangement.

Superseding the HT-C truck, a new bolsterless radial HTCR truck was fitted to all EMD SD70s built 1992–2002; in 2003 the non-radial HTSC truck (basically the HTCR made less costly by removing radial components) was made standard on the SD70ACe and SD70M-2 models; the radial HTCR truck remained available as an option.

== Models ==
=== SD70 (1992–1999) ===
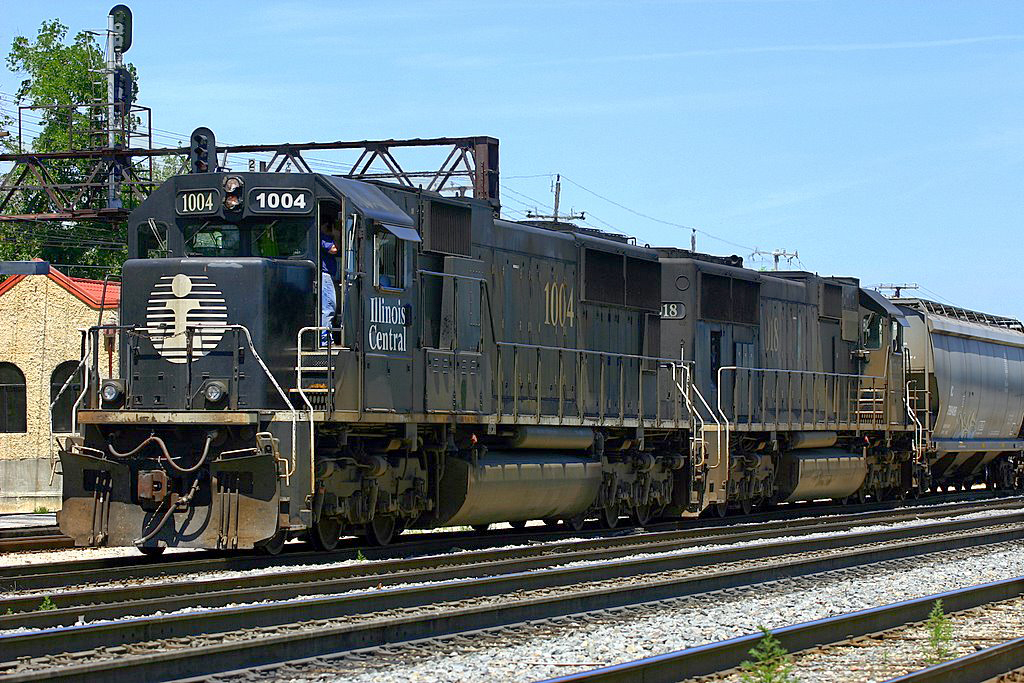
Illinois Central SD70 No. 1004

The EMD SD70 has the smaller spartan cab, typical on preceding SD60 models, instead of the larger comfort cab used on later models. Notable differences between the SD70 and SD60 are the radial steering EMD HTCR truck instead of the older HTC truck, and the SD70's overall length of 72 ft 4 in (22.05 m), with the older SD60 being 2 inches shorter. The SD70 also rides higher as its frame is approximately 1/2 inch (13 mm) higher than the SD60. This model is equipped with direct current (DC) traction motors, which simplifies the locomotive's electrical system by obviating the need for computer-controlled inverters (as are required for alternating current (AC) power). It is equipped with the 4,000 horsepower (3,000 kW), 16-cylinder EMD 710 prime mover. A total of 122 examples of this model locomotive were produced for Norfolk Southern (NS), Conrail (CR), Illinois Central (IC) and Southern Peru Copper Corporation (SPCC). Conrail's assets were split between Norfolk Southern and CSX in 1999, and all 24 of Conrail's SD70 units went to NS. Other than the CR paint scheme these units were built to NS specifications and numbered (2557 - 2580) in series with Norfolk Southern's already purchased SD70s.

Production of the standard cab at EMD's London, Ontario plant ended in 1999. The 24 Conrail SD70s were assembled from kits at Conrail's Juniata Shops in Altoona, Pennsylvania, while the IC and SPCC SD70s were assembled from kits at Super Steel Schenectady. As of 2026, most SD70s are still in service with Canadian National (CN), which merged with Illinois Central in 1999. In the late 2010s, Norfolk Southern upgraded 52 of their SD70s to SD70ACCs by converting them from DC to AC traction, installing a new wide-nose cab, as well as several other upgrades.

=== SD70M (1992–2004) ===
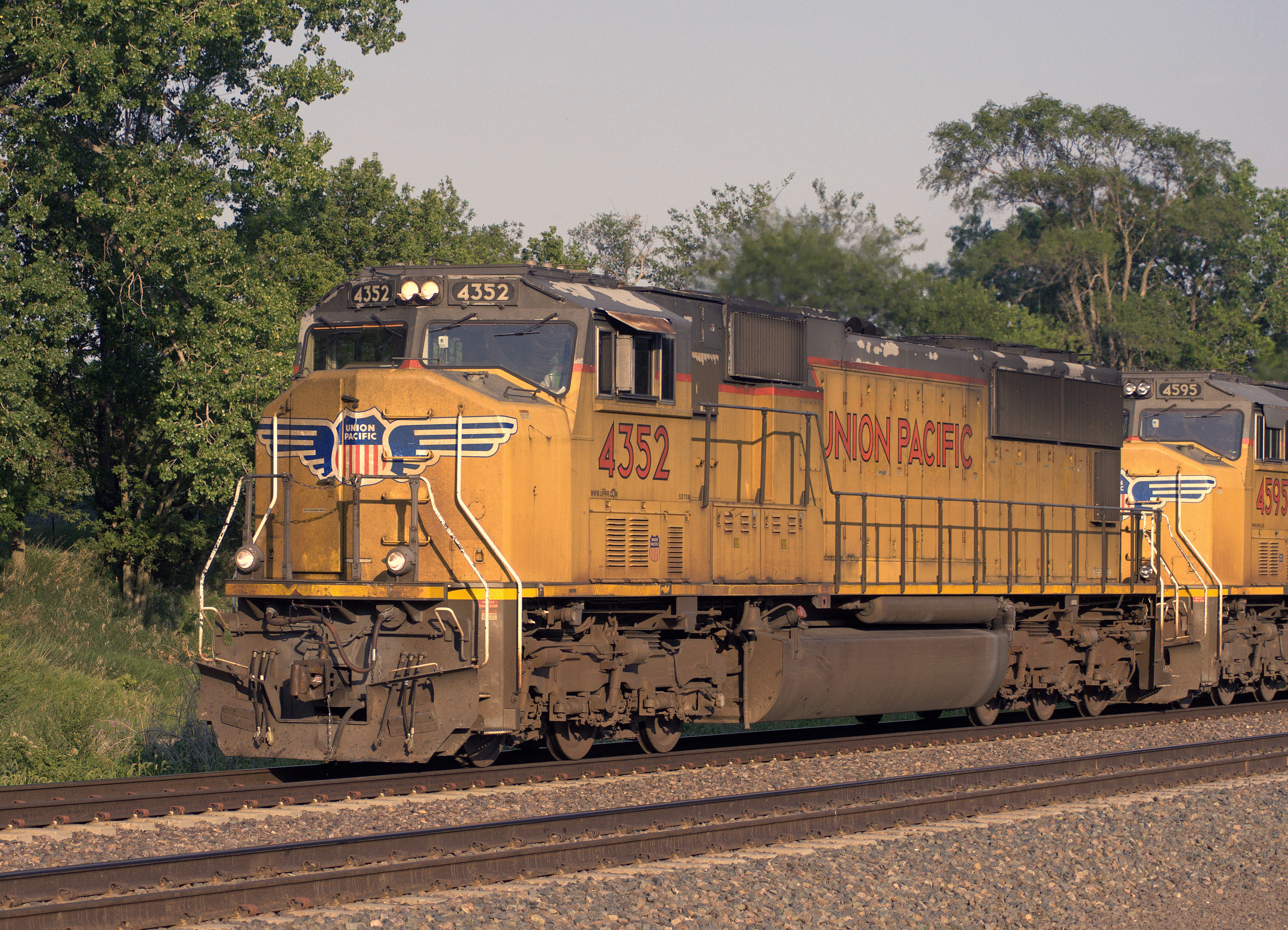
Union Pacific SD70M No. 4352

The SD70M has a wide nose and a large comfort cab (officially, the "North American Safety Cab"), allowing crew members to ride more comfortably than in older cab designs. There are two versions of this cab on SD70Ms: the Phase 1 cab, introduced on the SD60M, and the Phase 2 cab, a boxier design similar to the three-piece windscreen on the SD60M, which is shared with the Phase 2 SD90MAC, SD89MAC, and SD80ACe. The Phase 2 cab has a two-piece windscreen like the Phase 1 windscreen but the nose is boxier with a taller square midsection for headroom.

The SD70M has D90TR DC traction motors and the 710G3B prime mover that can generate 109,000 lbf (480 kN) of continuous tractive effort. From late 2001, the SD70M was produced with SD45-style flared radiators. These allowed the larger radiator cores needed for split-cooling, which separates the coolant circuit for the prime mover and the circuit for the air pumps and turbocharger. There are two versions of this radiator: the older has two large radiator panels on each side, and the newer has four square panels on each side, a response to the United States Environmental Protection Agency's (EPA) Tier 1 environmental regulations. Also, the truck was replaced with HTCR-4, instead of HTCR-I on former model.

Production of the SD70M ceased in late 2004 as production of the SD70M-2 model began (the EPA's Tier 2 regulations went into effect on January 1, 2005). A total of 1,609 SD70Ms were produced. The vast majority were purchased by Union Pacific, but some were bought by New York, Susquehanna & Western (NYSW; part of EMDX order no. 946531), Norfolk Southern, and Southern Pacific.

In 2000, Union Pacific ordered 1,000 units (UP 4000 through UP 4999, inclusive, although 4014 was renumbered 4479 to accommodate Big Boy 4014 in 2019). This order was later extended by nearly 500 units (UP 3999 and below, UP 5000 and above, except for 3985, which was left vacant for Challenger 3985).

The model is also built for export, and is still catalogued by EMD (at 4,300 hp or 3,200 kW). CVG Ferrominera Orinoco has six SD70Ms that were built as an add-on order to UP's FIRE-cab-equipped SD70Ms. Companhia Vale do Rio Doce (CVRD) in Brazil has ordered 55 of this model to pull iron ore from the Carajás mine. Since CVRD track is gauged at 1,600 mm (5 ft 3 in), a wider bogie, the HTSC2, was designed for these units by EMD.

=== SD70I (1995) ===
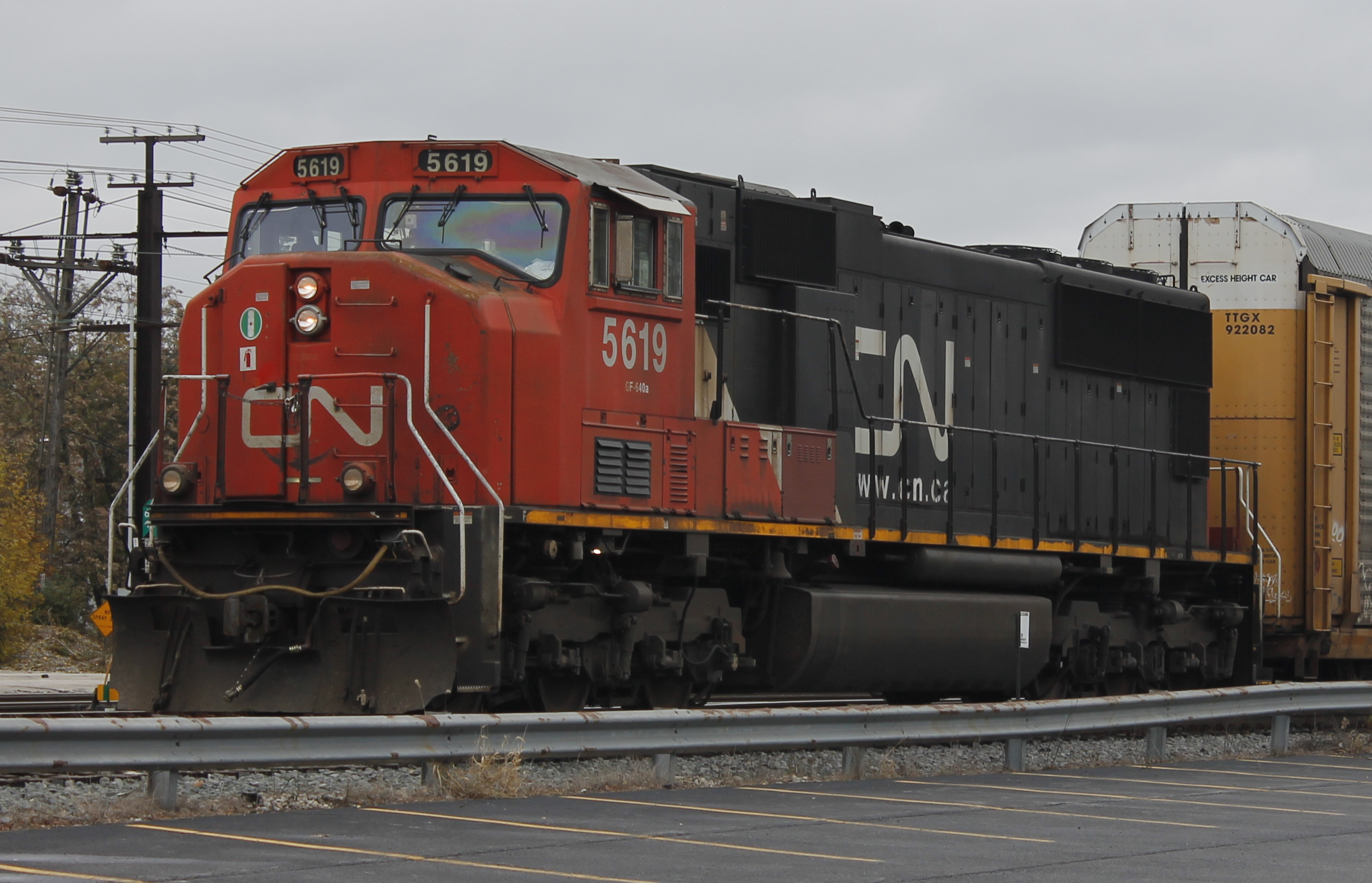
Canadian National SD70I No. 5619

The SD70I is a version of the SD70 with a "WhisperCab" that is isolated from the frame of the locomotive with rubber gaskets to reduce noise and vibration from the prime mover. A seam is visible across the nose and on the long hood where the cab connects with the body. A total of 26 examples of this model locomotive were produced, all for Canadian National. The WhisperCab feature was incorporated into some SD70MACs and was standard on both the SD80MAC and SD90/43MAC models.

=== SD70MAC (1993–2007) ===
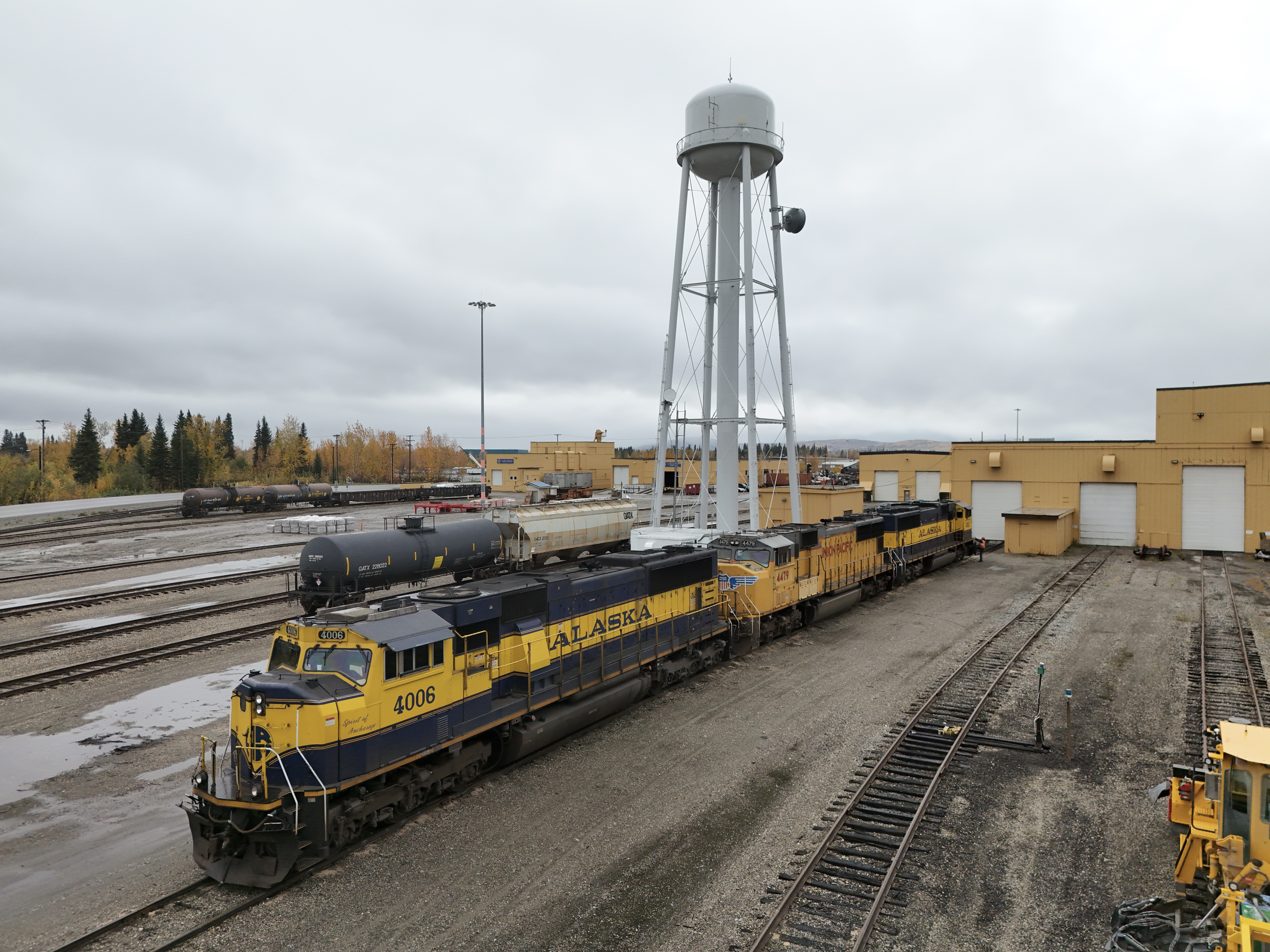
Alaska Railroad SD70MAC No. 4006 "Spirit of Anchorage"

The SD70MAC uses three-phase AC traction motors. Production of the model began in 1993, competing against the GE AC4400CW. Most SD70MAC models were produced with the 4,000 horsepower (3,000 kW) EMD 710 prime mover, although later units are rated at 4,300 horsepower (3,200 kW) and have EMD SD45-style flared radiators. Starting in 1993, the Alaska Railroad ordered a unique version of the SD70MAC with head-end power to make them suitable for both freight and passenger service. They reordered the version, even after EMD had shifted production to the SD70ACe, until in late 2007. The trucks were replaced with HTCR-4, instead of HTCR-I on former model.

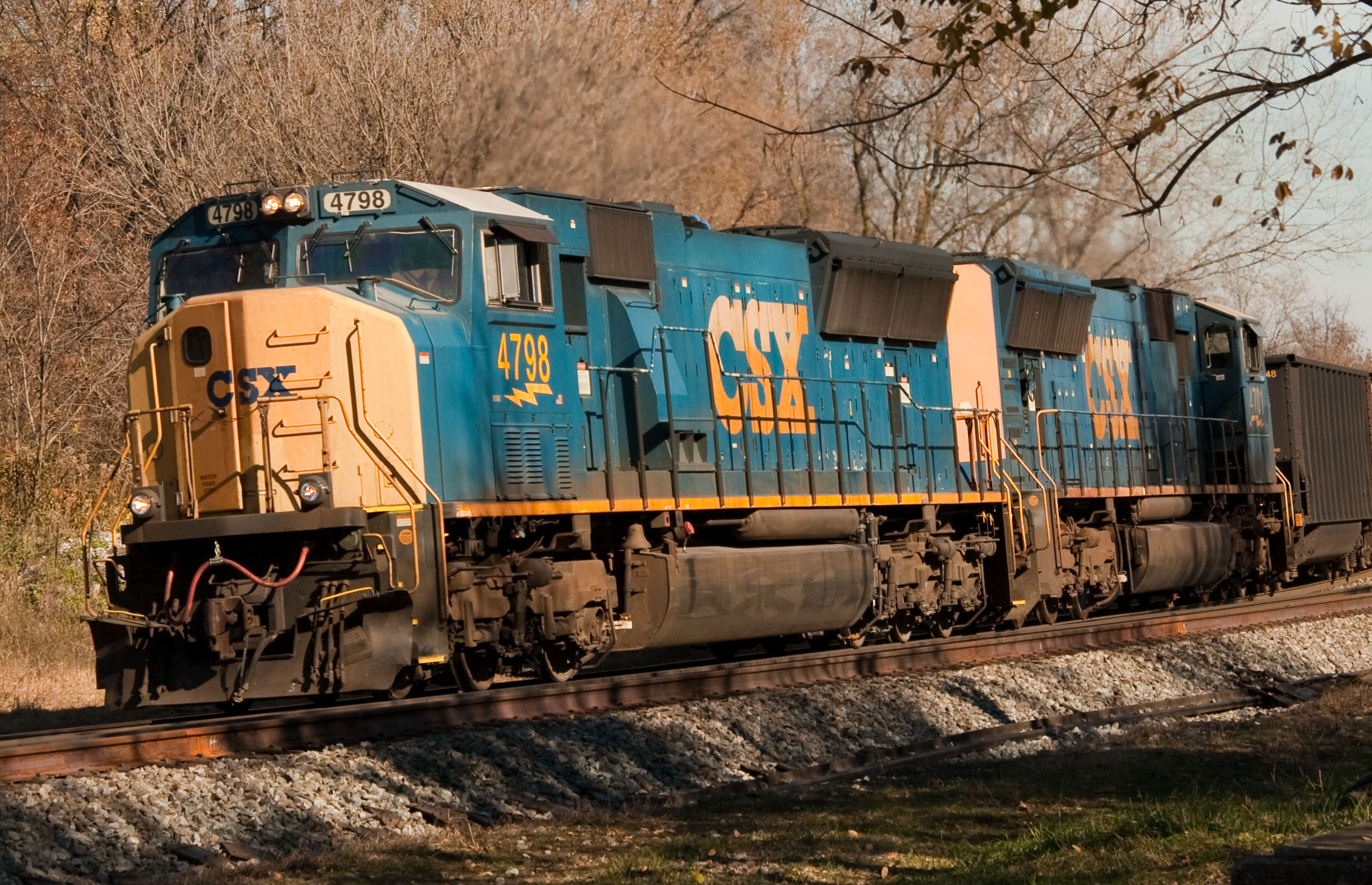
A pair of CSX SD70MAC's with SD45-style flared radiators

The SD70MAC is no longer produced due to EPA regulations, and was replaced by the SD70ACe in 2004. In total, 1,109 SD70MACs were produced, purchased by Burlington Northern (and its successor, BNSF), Conrail, CSX, Transportación Ferroviaria Mexicana (TFM; units now owned by Kansas City Southern Railway (KCS)), and the Alaska Railroad.

=== SD70ACe (2004–present) ===
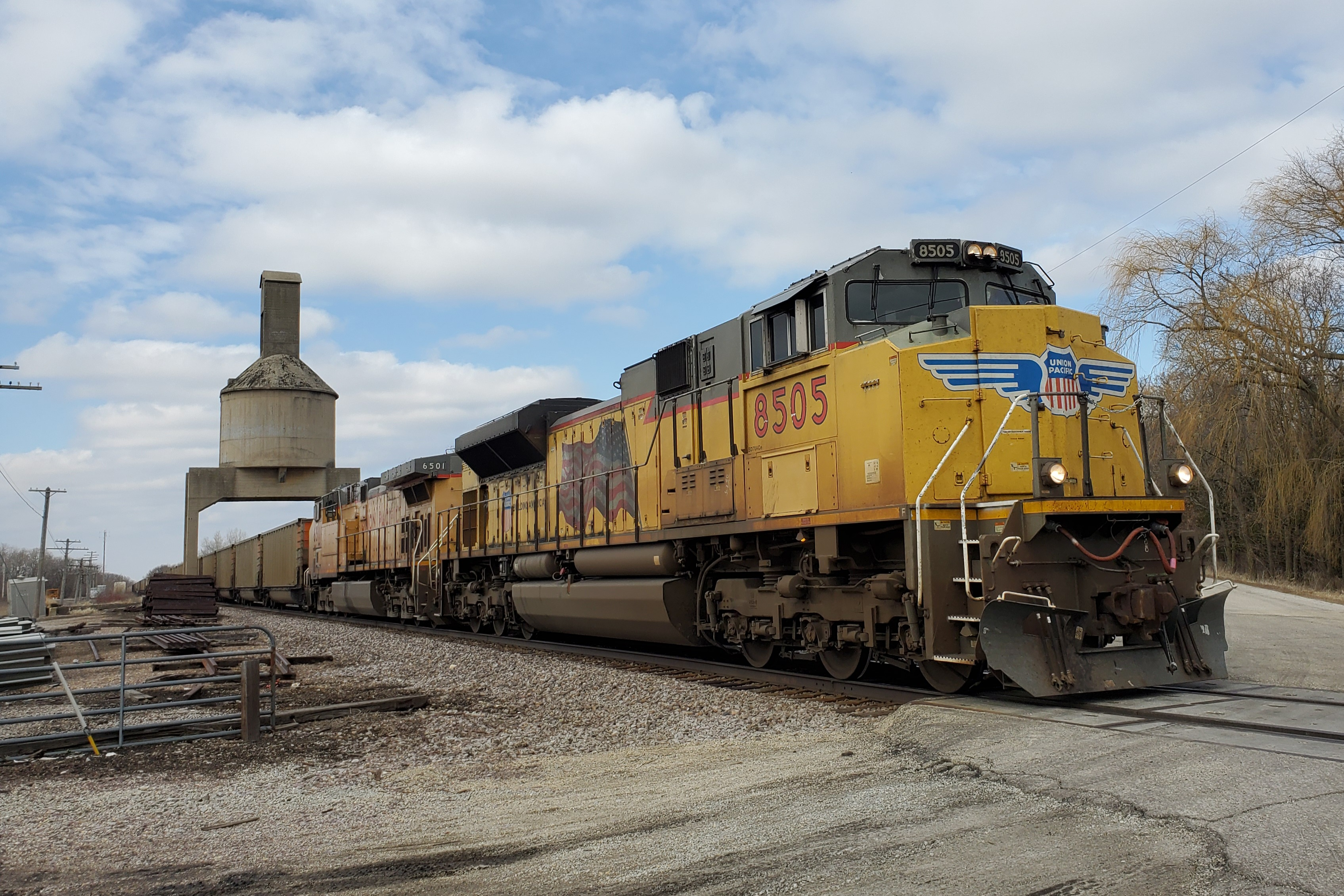
Union Pacific No. 8505 leads a coal train

The SD70ACe is the successor to the SD70MAC with design changes to comply with emission standards. The engine fires with 15% lower internal pressure to improve emissions and features fewer internal components in the inverter. The SD70ACe is equipped with EMD's 16-710-G3C-T2 prime mover, rated at 4,300 horsepower (3,200 kW); later Tier 3 models are rated at 4,500 horsepower (3,400 kW), and have a thermal efficiency of almost 36%. They are rated at 191,000 lbf (850 kN) starting tractive effort and 157,000 lbf (700 kN) continuous. Braking effort is rated at 106,000 lbf (470 kN). Early models featured a bad cab design which was noticed first on CSX as crews reported annoying disturbances such as prime mover noises, traction motors noise, and more. The cab was also known for rattling, leading to the nickname "Thundercabs". As a result, these units are also not approved for leading trains.

In 2012, EMD also built four models known as the SD70ACe-P6. These units, unlike previous SD70ACe's, have one inverter per axle on the trucks, rather than EMD's traditional one inverter per truck design. Four of those (EMDX 1206, 1208, 1209 and 1210) were sold to Canadian National Railway and renumbered to CN 8100–8103.

In 2014, BNSF took delivery of 20 SD70ACe-P4 units, numbered 8500 - 8519. This model was designed with a B1-1B wheel arrangement to compete with GE's ES44C4 model, which has an A1A-A1A wheel arrangement. Both wheel arrangements mean that there are only two traction motors per truck instead of three, those being the ones next to the fuel tank. Two SD70ACe-P4 demonstrators began a 5-year lease at Tacoma Rail in late 2014, and were later sold to Arkansas & Missouri Railroad in late 2023.

On January 1, 2015, the United States Environmental Protection Agency's Tier 4 locomotive emission regulations went into effect. EMD could not successfully modify the SD70ACe's 2-stroke 710 series prime mover to be Tier 4-compliant; thus, the Tier 3 SD70ACe was succeeded by the SD70ACe-T4 in late 2015. However, US production of the Tier 3-compliant SD70ACe continues with Tier 4 'credit units' (new Tier 3-compliant units EMD is entitled to build based on previously earned emissions credits). Union Pacific and Norfolk Southern are currently the only US roads to own Tier 4 credit unit SD70ACe's. Additionally, EMD has continued building Tier 3 SD70ACe's for Ferromex (4100–4118), Ferrosur (4119–4133), and Kansas City Southern de Mexico (4200–4224) at Bombardier Ciudad Sahagun. These locomotives are restricted to Mexico-only operation and cannot cross the US border (just as Canadian National's newest Tier 3 GE ES44AC's are restricted to Canadian use only).

In March 2016, EMD replaced the standard cast HTCR-4 trucks on NS SD70ACe 1000 with the new fabricated HTCR-6 trucks for testing. UP and BNSF plan to test the new HTCR-6 trucks on some of their SD70ACe units also.

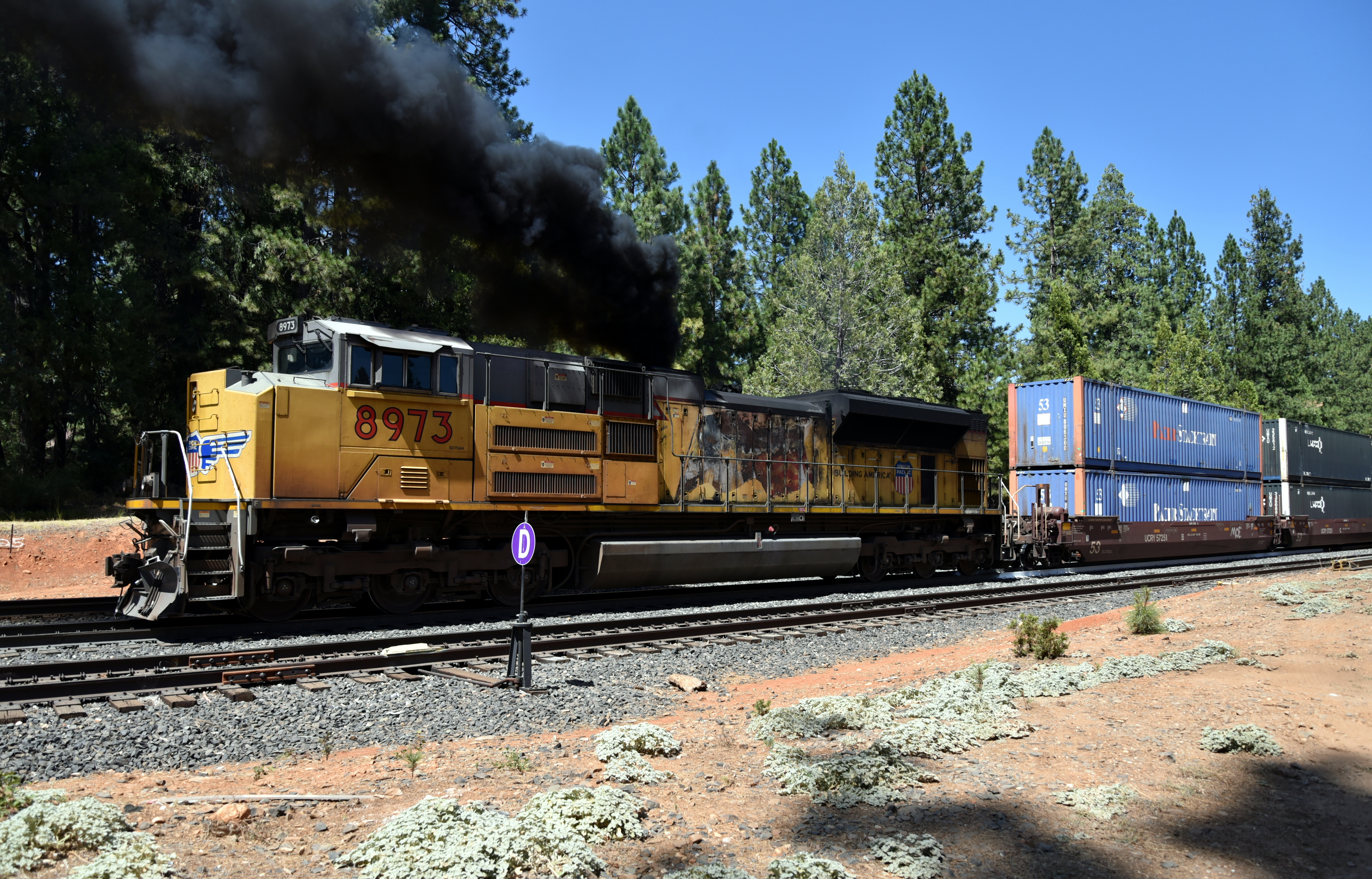
UP SD70AH locomotive at the end of the freight train going up Sierra Nevadas

Union Pacific received 281 additional SD70ACe units, numbered 8824 - 9104, in 2014, 2016 and 2018. These are referred to as SD70AH (T4C), H for "heavy", because they are ballasted to 428,000 lb (194,138 kg) rather than 420,000 lb (190,509 kg).

==== 2TE3250 (2021) ====
In mid-2021, the Yakutian Railway received two SD70ACes, designated 2TE3250 (Russian: 2ТЭ3250) by Yakutian Railway itself. These units, numbered 0001 and 0002, are currently in use in Yakutia, and are operated as a two-section locomotive.

In November 2021, Yakutian Railway announced a tender for six more, single-section locomotives. However, as of 4 February 2022, it has been unable to make an order for them.

=== SD70M-2 (2004–2011) ===
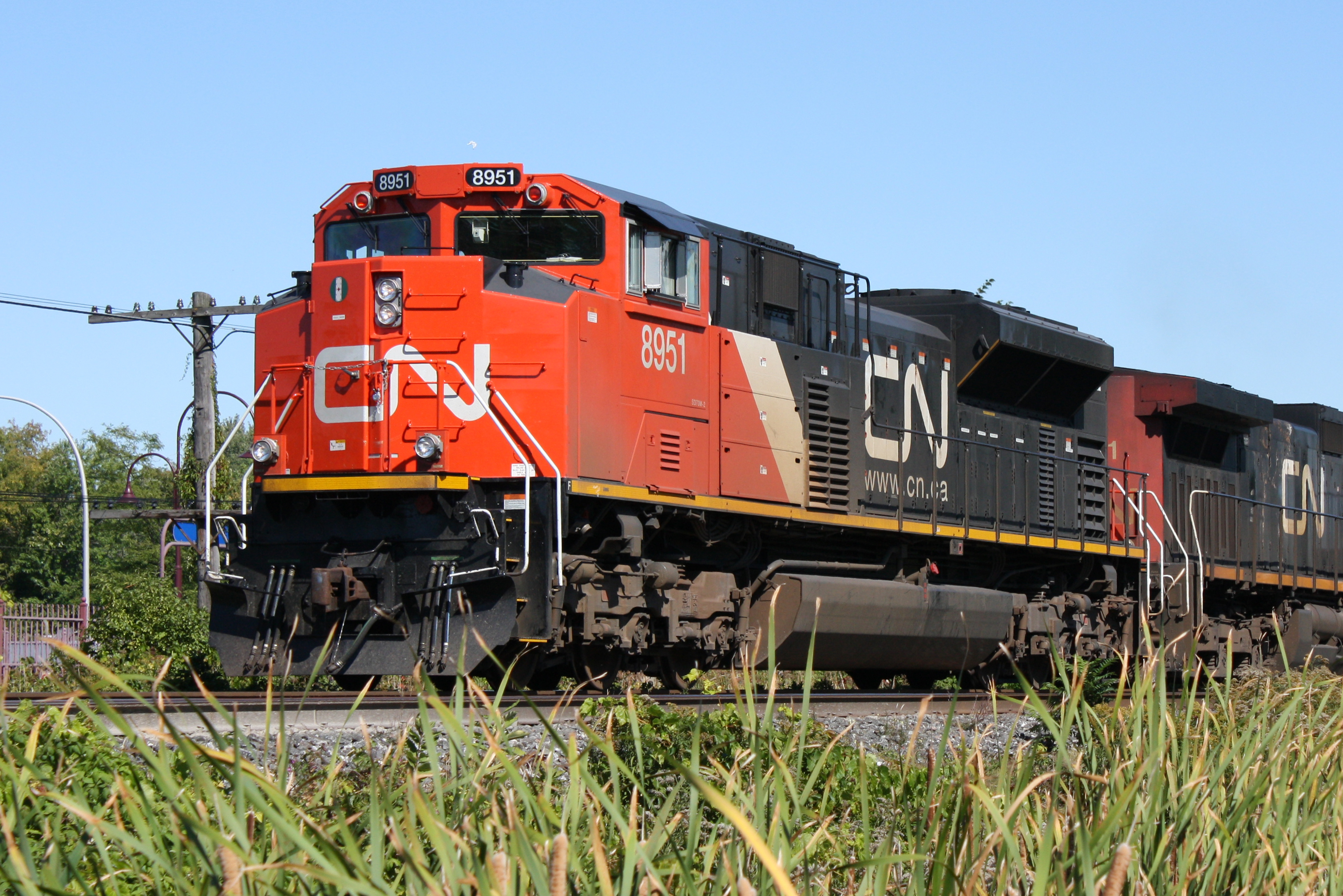
Canadian National SD70M-2 No. 8951

The SD70M-2 is a DC traction version of the SD70ACe. The "-2" in the model name indicates that the units are EPA Tier II compliant and that the locomotive has upgraded electronics, which was true for older models (EMD SD40-2). SD70M-2 models are equipped with the 16-710G3C-T2 or 16-710G3C prime mover which is rated at 4,300 horsepower (3,200 kW).

In total, 331 SD70M-2s were built, with Canadian National owning 190 units. Eight units owned by Electro-Motive Diesel and four units owned by CIT Financial were leased by Florida East Coast Railway until early 2015. Canadian National 8964 was the last SD70M-2, built in February 2011. Vermont Railway owns 2 units numbered 431 and 432. Norfolk Southern ordered 130 SD70M-2s, of which 46 remained in service as of July 2023 with 2 units rebuilt with AC traction. Currently, NBM Railways owns 13 SD70M-2, former NS units, numbered 6401–6413 with plans for six more rounding it out to 6419. All are marked for the various NBM companies, New Brunswick Southern Railway, Eastern Maine Railway, and Maine Northern Railway.

=== SD70ACe-T4 (2015–present) ===
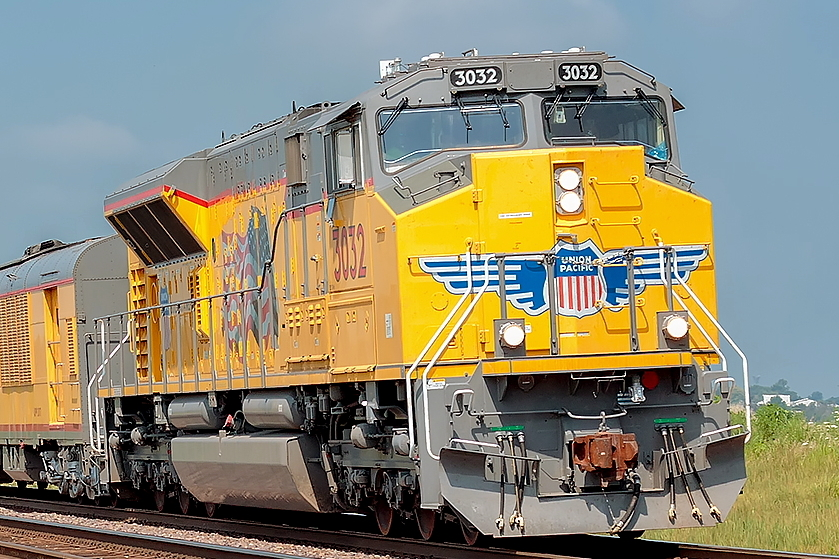
Union Pacific SD70ACe-T4 No. 3032

The SD70ACe-T4 is the Tier 4 emissions standards-compliant successor of the SD70ACe. The first locomotive, EMDX 1501, was built in summer 2015, and made its debut at the Railway Interchange Expo in Minneapolis, Minnesota during the weekend of October 3–4, 2015. It features a new 4-stroke engine called the EMD 12-1010 "J" series - a V12 with 1,010 in^{3} displacement for each cylinder. This new prime mover has a two-stage turbocharger system consisting of three turbos; one turbo (the primary/high pressure turbo) for low-mid RPM and two turbos (the secondary/low pressure turbos) for mid-high RPM. The results of this setup are higher power throughout a broader RPM range, better fuel efficiency, and lower emissions. An EGR system is applied as well, allowing the engine to achieve Tier 4 without the use of urea aftertreatment. Another new feature of this engine is the Double-Walled Fuel Injection System that increases safety and simplifies maintenance.

The EMD 12-1010 is capable of producing 4,600 horsepower (3,400 kW) total, 4,400 horsepower (3,300 kW) is used for traction. With a new computer software for the on-board computer and one inverter per axle (or "P6"; EMD named it "Individual Axle Control") - unlike most of previous EMD locomotives that use one inverter per truck, the SD70ACe-T4 is capable of generating 200,000 pounds-force (890 kN) of starting tractive effort, and 175,000 pounds-force (780 kN) of continuous tractive effort. Meanwhile, its dynamic braking effort is as much as 105,000 pounds-force (470 kN). The amount of starting tractive effort is equal to that of the 6,000 horsepower (4,500 kW) SD90MAC-H while, on the other hand, its continuous tractive effort is higher than that of the SD90MAC-H (175,000 pounds-force (780 kN) vs. 165,000 pounds-force (730 kN)). The units are also equipped with "radial bogies" which offer increased adhesion and better ride quality.

While it retains the basic SD70 designation, the locomotive has several major new features that set it apart from its successful ancestor such as a vibration-isolated powertrain, and alternator start capability. In addition, it features a newly redesigned cab reminiscent of the earlier SD70M, featuring the classic "teardrop" windshields first introduced on the FP45 in December 1967; new fabricated trucks; a longer frame at 76 feet 8 inches (23.37 m); longer radiators with three radiator fans instead of two; an additional step on the front and rear; and a smoother long hood roofline.

Fifteen SD70ACe-T4 demonstrators were built at Muncie, Indiana by November 2016. Union Pacific was the first customer to order SD70ACe-T4's. UP 3012–3014, the first production SD70ACe-T4's, were assigned to active service in early November 2016.

Union Pacific acquired 100 SD70ACe-T4's: 12 former demonstrators rostered as UP 3000–3011, and 88 production units (3012–3099). 3012-3056 were built at Bombardier's Sahagun, Mexico plant. 3057-3099 will be built at Muncie, IN, following completion of the Tier 4 credit SD70ACe's UP 8997–9096. All UP SD70ACe-T4's are classified as SD70AHs.

SD70ACeP4-T4's EMDX 1603 and 1604 were built and painted as demonstrators for the BNSF Railway. These units have a B1-1B wheel arrangement akin to the SD70ACe-P4.

In August 2018, CSX Transportation ordered 10 SD70ACe-T4's. They were classified by CSX as ST70AH. In July 2023, CSX Transportation sidelined their ST70AH locomotives due to the leasing agreement being expired. All 10 have been taken back to PRLX and will more than likely be used as parts or on the lease fleet.

Norfolk Southern originally ordered 10 SD70ACe-T4's, but opted for more SD70ACe Tier-4 credit locomotives instead. The cancelled units are currently part of the Progress Rail lease fleet.

EMDX 1501 will remain in Progress Rail Services ownership as a test bed.

In December 2025, Lake State Railway bought 4 SD70ACe-T4 locomotives from Progress Rail.

In January 2026, CPKC Railway announced an order for 65 SD70ACe-T4 locomotives.

=== SD70ACe/LCi (2005–present) ===
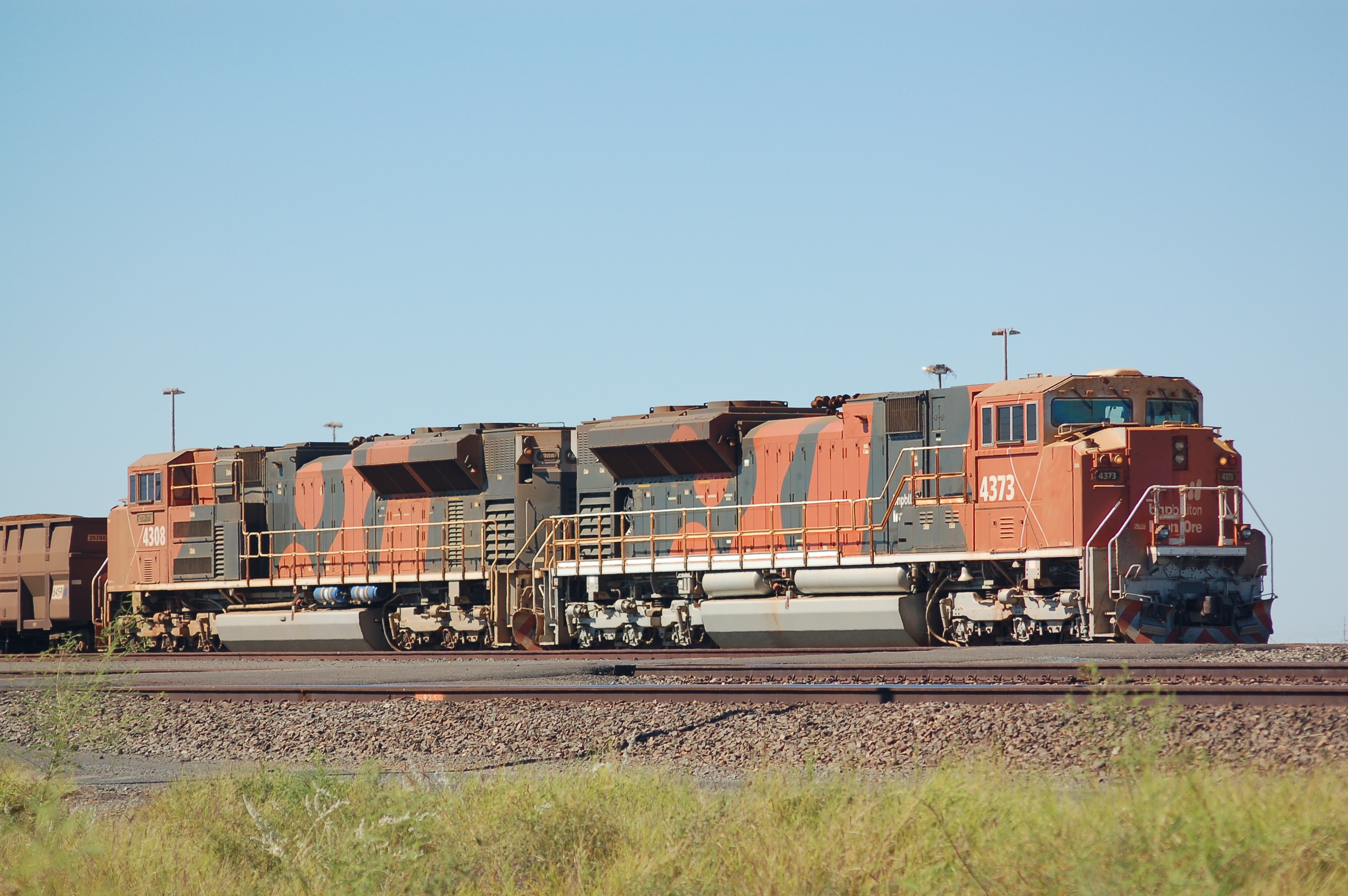
BHP SD70ACe/LCi No. 4308

The SD70ACe/LCi is a low clearance, export version of the SD70ACe. The LCi in the model designation stands for Low Clearance international as these locomotives are designed to negotiate the tight clearances under the mine equipment. External differences between the SD70ACe and SD70ACe/LCi models include the addition of marker lights, number boards located lower on the nose rather than on top of the cab, windscreen protector panels (to deflect abrasive iron ore when in mid train position), fire suppression canisters, louvre style vents, different horn and subtle differences with handrails.

In 2004, BHP Billiton ordered 14 SD70ACe/LCi locomotives for use on iron ore trains in the Pilbara region of Western Australia. The first member of the class (4300) was purchased for parts and dismantled upon arrival in Australia. This was because it was cheaper to purchase a complete locomotive than buy the components individually. They were named after sidings on the BHP system. Since they did not have the newer, isolated cab of the second and subsequent batches, 4301–4313 were traded in to Progress Rail for locomotives with newer cab assemblies and repatriated to the United States in January 2015 being taken to Muncie, Indiana for store. They were overhauled and sold to Chemin de fer Arnaud (4), Montana Rail Link (4) and Quebec North Shore & Labrador (5).

The second batch of 10 SD70ACes (4314–4323) arrived between August and November 2006. An order for a third batch of 13 SD70ACe/LCi's (4334–4346) was placed in August 2007, but such was the demand for locomotive power in the Pilbara region, a deal was done with BNSF for BHP Billiton to purchase ten standard North American SD70ACes (4324–4333) that were in build as their 9166, 9167, 9184–9191. Construction was sufficiently advanced when the deal was concluded for them to have been painted, hence they were delivered in BNSF orange livery. Some modifications have been made to bring them in line with the rest of the fleet. A fifth batch of SD70ACes (Numbers 4347–4355) was delivered in July 2009.

An additional 18 units (numbers 4356–4373) were delivered in the second half of 2010, bringing the total of SD70ACe type locomotives in service to 72. In March 2012, BHP Billiton ordered a further 80. As at October 2020, BHP operated 10 SD70ACes (4324–4333) and 174 SD70 Ace/LCis (4314–4323, 4334–4497)

In July 2012 fellow Pilbara operator, Fortescue, took the delivery of the first of a fleet of 19, later extended to 21 (701–721).

=== SD70ACS (2009–present) ===
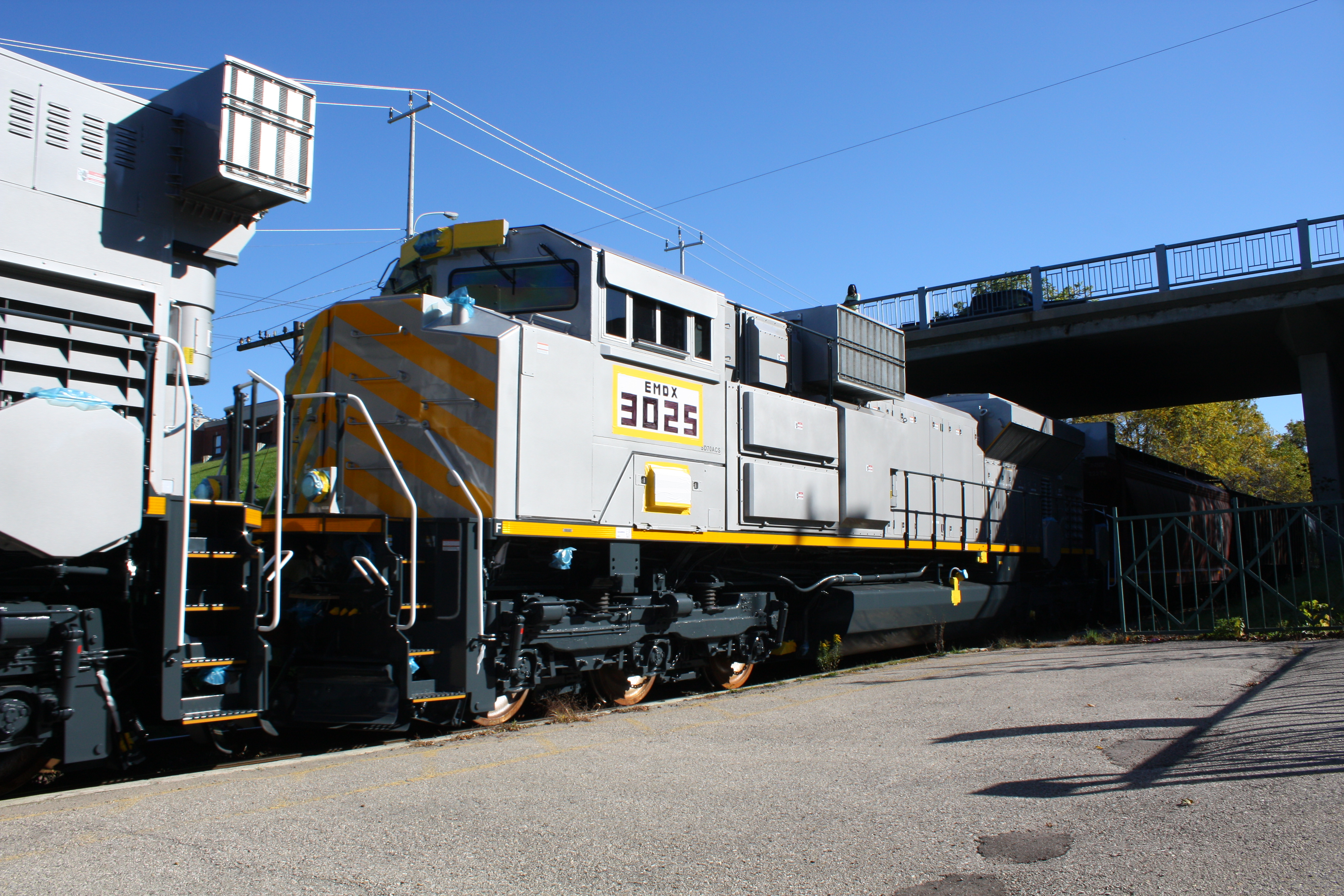
Saudi Railway Company EMDX SD70ACS No. 3025

The SD70ACS is a 4,500 horsepower (3,400 kW) AC variant for heavy haul freight, used in desert environments. The first 25 units were ordered for Saudi Railway Company in April 2009 and assembled in the London, Ontario, plant for delivery in the second half of 2010. Special features include a pulse filtration system, movable sand plows, EM2000 control system and FIRE display system.

Mauritania's Société Nationale Industrielle et Minière placed a contract for six SD70ACS locomotives in October 2010.

In July 2011 Etihad Rail ordered seven SD70ACS locomotives for delivery in 2012. Seven locomotives were delivered in 2013.

=== SD70ACe-BB (2015–present) ===
In October 2015, EMD started producing SD70ACe-BB locomotives for Brazilian 1,000 mm (3 ft 3 3/8 in) railroads. Unlike the standard SD70ACe, the SD70ACe-BB has a B+B-B+B wheel arrangement, meaning that it has eight axles instead of six. To fit the B+B trucks, the SD70ACe-BB was elongated to 74 ft 9 in (22.78 m), making it 2 ft 5 in (0.74 m) longer than the standard SD70ACe.

=== SD70ACe/45 (2004–present) ===
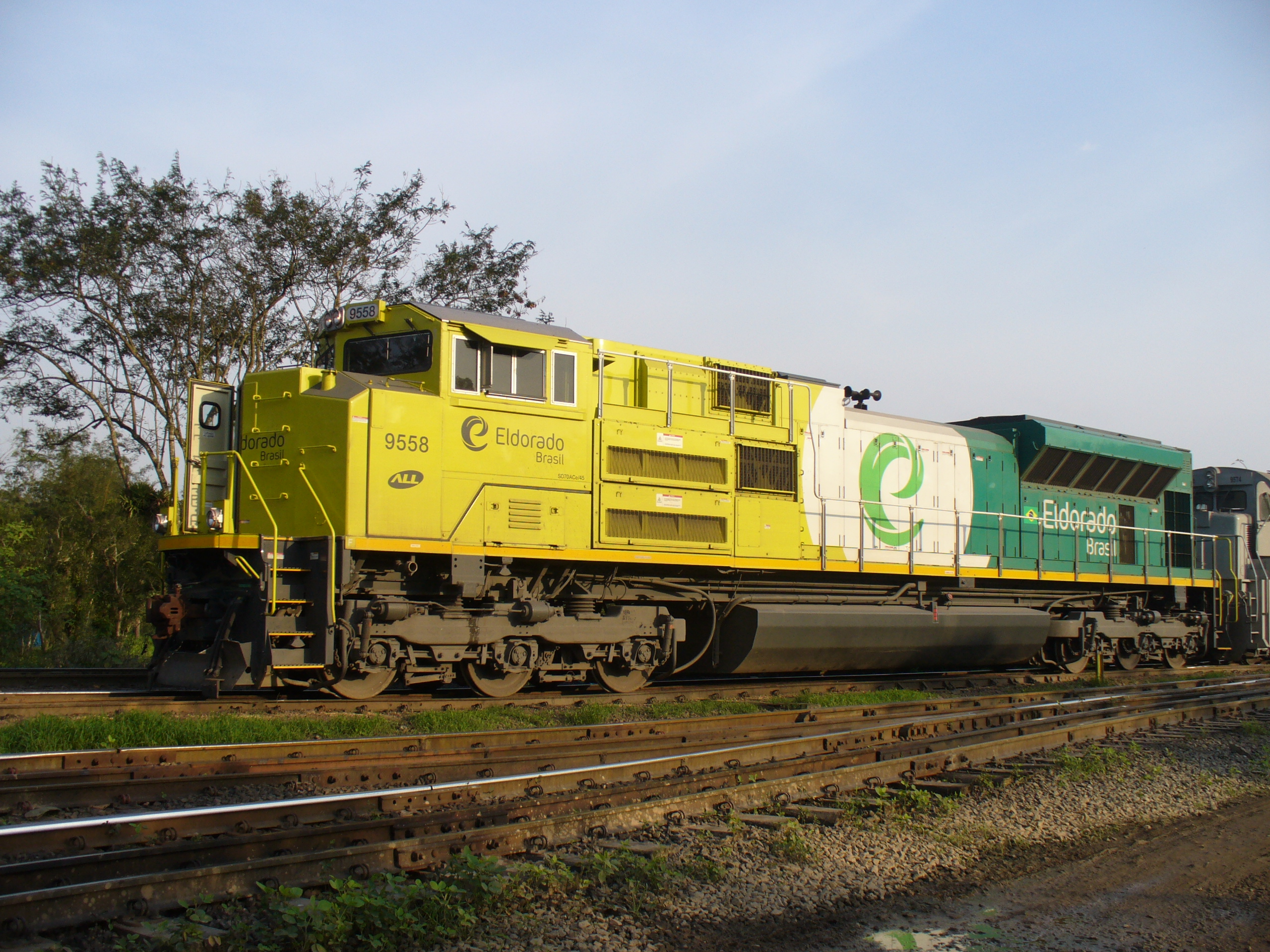
Eldorado Brasil SD70ACe/45 No. 9558

The SD70ACe/45 is a diesel-electric locomotive built by EMD plant in Sete Lagoas, MG Brazil. Different from the SD70ACe in North America, the SD70ACe/45 has a longer frame (76 ft. 6 in.) and three radiator fans on the radiator section since it uses the same car body of the SD80ACe produced by EMD plant in London, Canada to Vale mining in Brazil. It uses 1,600 mm (5 ft 3 in) gauge. 80 SD70ACe/45s had been built.

=== SD70IAC (2019–present) ===
In early 2019 with the delivery of the new SD70ACe-T4C locomotives to Norfolk Southern, a new type of the T4C (Tier 4 Credit) locomotives was rolled out of Progress Rail in Muncie, Indiana. IAC stands for Individual Axle Control. They are still classified as SD70ACe's on the side of the locomotive but are designated as SD70IAC within the cab controls. The new IAC system improves the existing traction system.

=== SD70ACe/LW (2007, 2021–present) ===
The SD70ACe/LW is designed specifically for rail networks using Russian gauge, featuring a new isolated cab similar to the flat nosed cab of the GT46C-ACe Gen-II. The SD70ACe/LW has a 16-710G3C-T2 prime-mover with 4,500 horsepower. It uses an AC traction system with a top speed of 74 mph (120 km/h). Although it was designed in 2007, the first orders only occurred in mid-2021, when 16 were purchased for the Mongolian Tavan Tolgoi-Gashuunsukhait Railway project.

=== SD70H (2026–present) ===
The SD70H (hybrid) was debuted at InnoTrans in 2026 as a diesel-electric with battery-assisted hybrid functionality. The locomotive uses regenerative braking to capture dynamic brake energy and use battery propulsion to assist at periods of peak loads. Canadian National Railway has ordered one SD70H.

== Rebuilds ==
=== SD70ACU ===
Norfolk Southern SD70ACU No. 7305

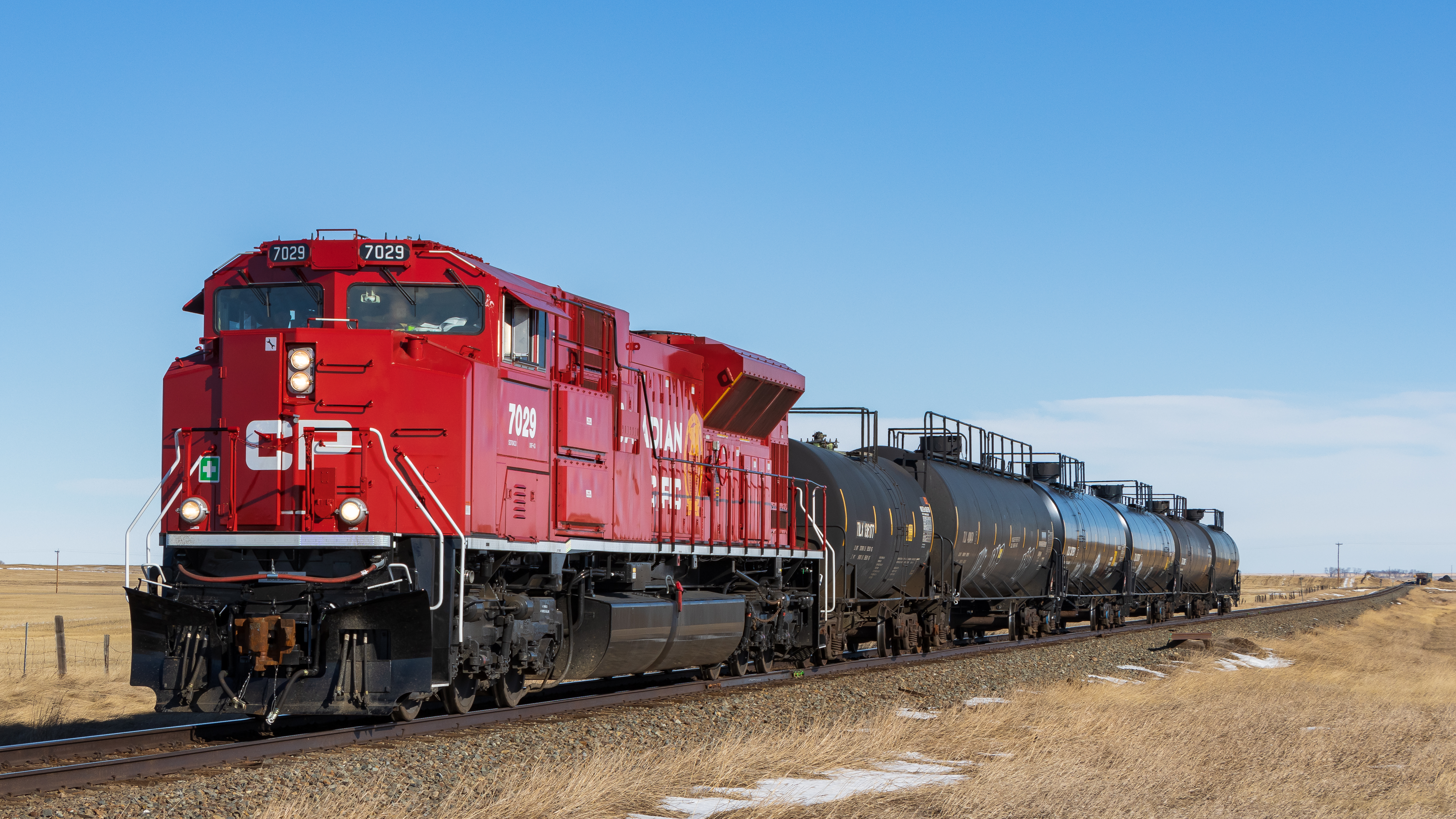
Canadian Pacific SD70ACU No. 7029

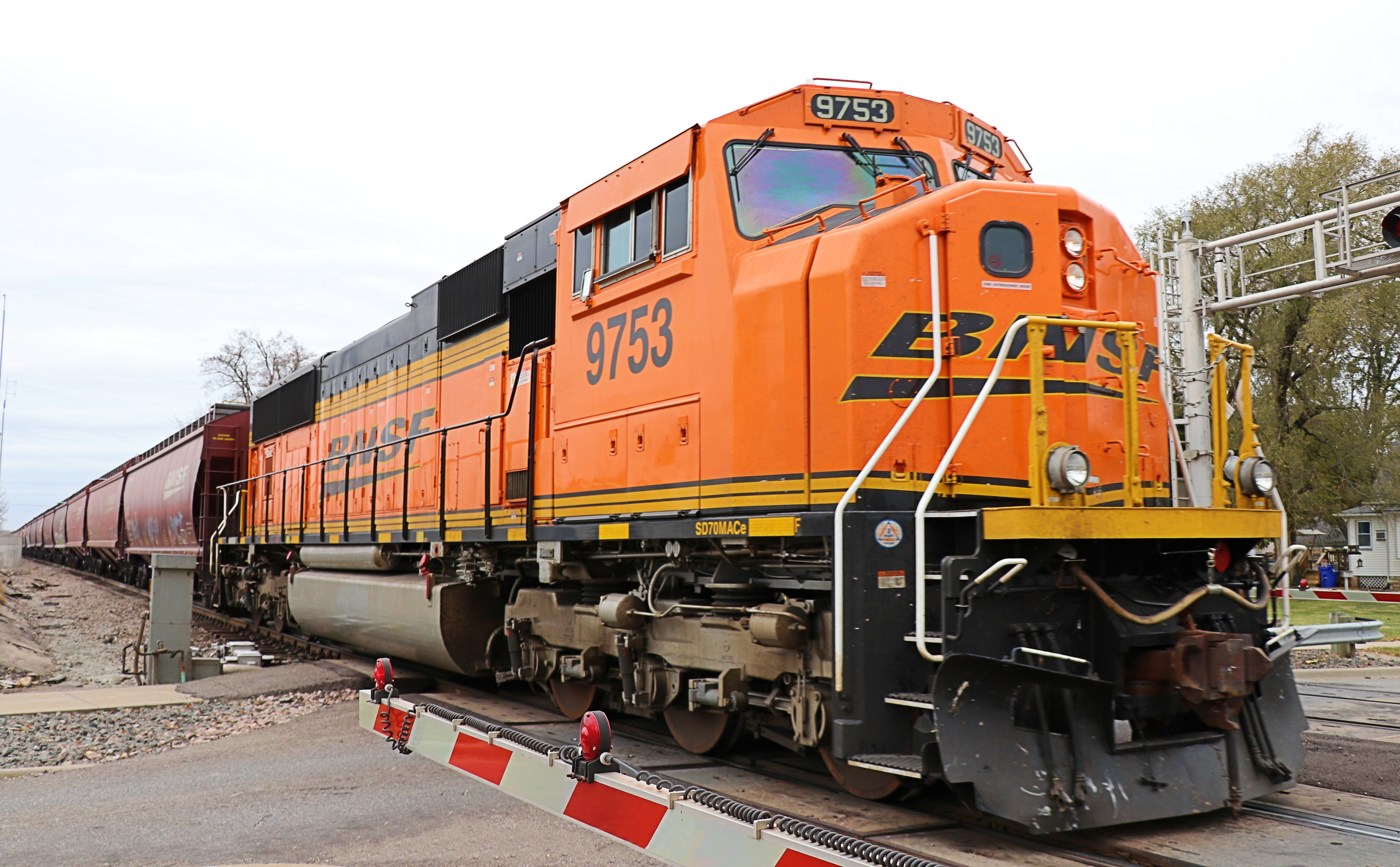
BNSF SD70MACe No. 9753

The SD70ACU is a rebuild performed by Norfolk Southern and Progress Rail Services. It is originally an SD90MAC (or better known as a SD9043MAC) that has been rebuilt to replace its Siemens electrical components with equipment from Mitsubishi and replace the cab with the new EMD Phase-II cab to comply with the most recent safety requirements. Because it is built on the recycled frame of the older SD90MAC, it is currently the longest single frame diesel electric locomotive in revenue service today.

100 of the 110 units Norfolk Southern purchased were originally SD9043MACs previously operated by Union Pacific. The other 10 units were acquired by a trade with Cit Group for MP15DCs. All NS-owned SD9043MACs were rebuilt by NS at its shops in Altoona, Pennsylvania. The first locomotives were released from the shop in January 2016. By May 7, 2019, all 110 SD70ACU units owned by Norfolk Southern were completed and released to active service. 46 of these were sold in November 2020 with 30 of them going to Ferromex in 2024.

Canadian Pacific has also begun a program to convert their SD90MAC units into SD70ACUs, but unlike Norfolk Southern, Progress Rail is performing the rebuilds. The initial order was for 30 units and then increased to 60. Canadian Pacific originally rostered 61 SD90MACs, which spent much of the 2010-decade parked in long-term storage, with the exception of three, which were retired and scrapped in 2012. The remaining 58, along with two surplus Union Pacific SD90MACs, will be used as cores for the 60 SD70ACUs. These units began delivering in 2019.

From this order came numerous heritage units. Namely: CP 7010–7014 in CP's tuscan red, gray, and gold paint scheme with script lettering, CP 7015–7019 in the same paint but with block lettering, CP 7020 in NATO green representing temperate climates, CP 7021 in the sand color used for arid climates, CP 7022 wears the grey, red and black colour pattern of modern warships, CP 7023 wears a two-tone gray paint scheme inspired by fighter jets, CP 6644 wears the camouflage colours applied to Royal Canadian Air Force “Spitfire” fighter planes flown at the Allied invasion of Normandy, France, on June 6, 1944, and is numbered in remembrance of that date. CP 7015 led the CP business train for a short time due to a mechanical failure with the regular units and then returned to freight service. The remaining units received the standard CP red paint scheme.

In 2021, Canadian Pacific purchased 40 more SD90MACs from the Union Pacific for further rebuilding into SD70ACU engines.

=== SD70ACC ===
The SD70ACC is the latest rebuild in Norfolk Southern's DC to AC program. It has the new EMD safety cab, similar to the SD70ACe cab, but with the “teardrop windshield”, much like the SD70ACe-T4. The SD70ACC has been rebuilt with AC traction motors, an AAR-style control stand, an electrical cabinet with Mitsubishi electronics, a new main alternator, and additional weight to increase the maximum weight to 432,000 pounds (196.0 t). The SD70ACC is rated at 4,500 horsepower (3,355.649 kilowatts), has a fuel capacity of 4,900 US gallons (19,000 L), and has dynamic braking, cab signals, and LSL (Locomotive Speed Limiter). The first locomotive was released to service in November 2018.

Norfolk Southern planned to rebuild their entire fleet of SD70s into SD70ACC specifications. The first two units, 1800 and 1801, were unveiled in a special yellow and grey paint scheme to promote the DC to AC program, similar to the paint schemes used on the first GE AC44C6M. As of 2026, 52 units have been rebuilt and have since been released to service. The program was permanently halted in 2020 as Norfolk Southern retired their remaining SD70s.

=== SD70MACe ===
The SD70MACe is a rebuilt SD70MAC locomotive with new Mitsubishi electronics and traction motors to replace the Siemens traction motors. It was first rebuilt for the BNSF Railway, and later rebuilt for CSX (classified as SD70AC) and KCS.

=== SD70MACH ===
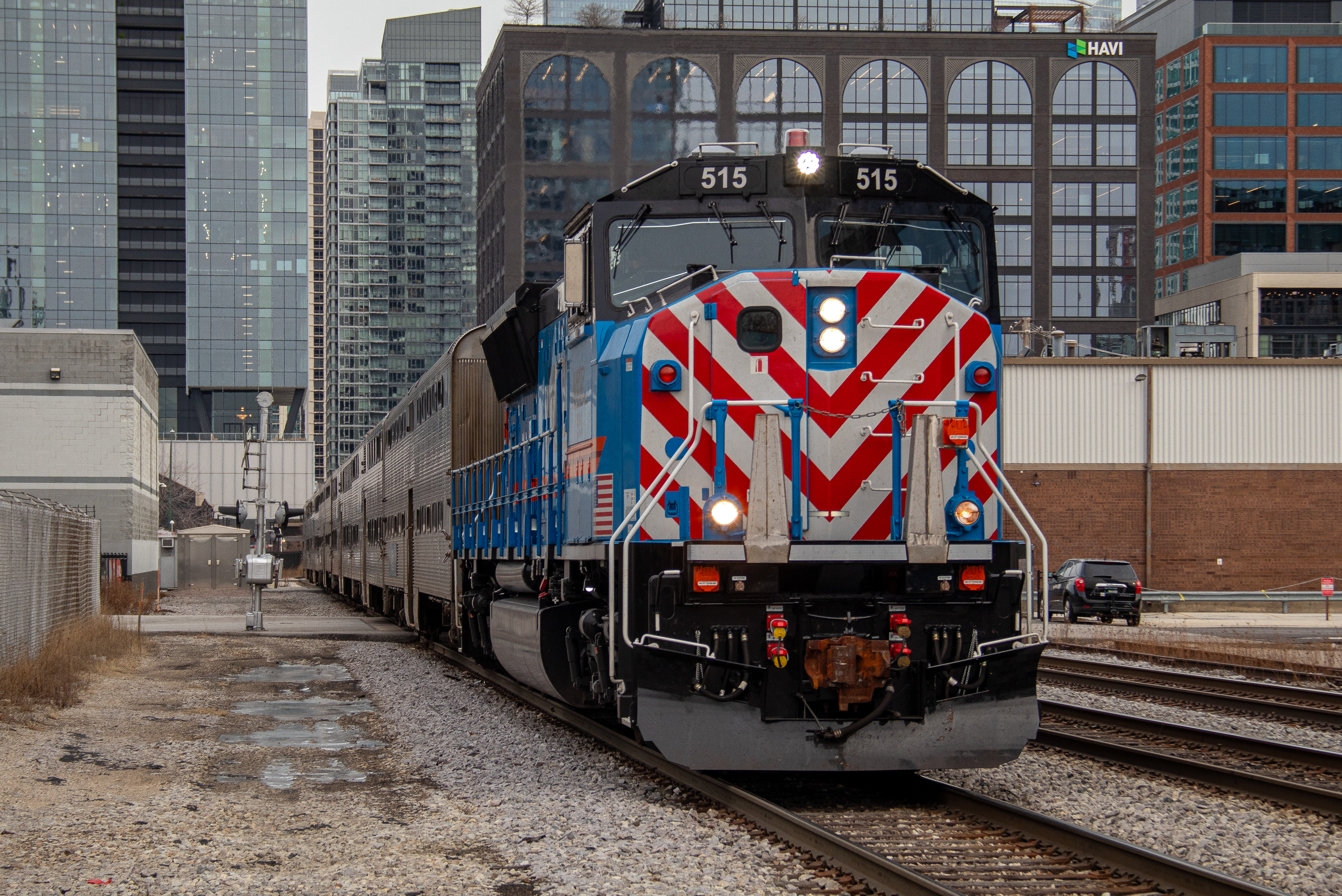
Metra SD70MACH No. 515

The SD70MACH is an SD70MAC rebuilt by Progress Rail for Metra. A purchase of 15 SD70MACHs for passenger service has been approved, with options of up to 27 more. The first unit was delivered in 2022 and entered service in late 2023. They are the first six-axle passenger locomotives since the EMD F40C and the Alaska Railroad's HEP-equipped SD70MACs. All of Metra's SD70MACHs are former SD70MACs previously operated by Kansas City Southern de México.

The rebuild includes the addition of head end power (HEP) along with meeting Tier 3 emissions. The axles are configured in a B1-1B configuration as one inverter is repurposed for supplying HEP. The SD70MACH is designed to be significantly quieter than older freight models, generating 85 dBA during idle and operating which is 40% quieter than the SD70AC and also designed to have a 50% smaller noise footprint compared to the F40PHs.

=== SD70ICC ===
The SD70ICC is an SD70M-2 rebuilt with AC traction by Progress Rail. Units are rebuilt from Norfolk Southern and PRLX SD70M-2's. Norfolk Southern is currently the only operator of these units. 96 more of these rebuilds are planned.

== Operators ==
| Image | Railroad | Qty. | Road numbers | Notes |
SD70
| | Illinois Central | 40 | 1000–1039 | Units 1006, 1013, 1014 & 1023 were wrecked and retired. |
| | Norfolk Southern | 80 | 2501–2580 | Units 2557–2580 are ex-Conrail units, but built to NS specifications. 52 units have been rebuilt as SD70ACCs, and all remaining units were sold to PRLX in 2020. |
| | Southern Peru Copper Corporation | 2 | 60–61 | Assembled in April 1999, these were the last standard or "spartan" cab units produced by EMD, and were built as an add-on to Illinois Central SD70's 1020–1039, even matching their specifications. |
SD70M
| | EMDX | 3 | 7000-7002 | Sold to CSX, later to Central Oregon & Pacific |
| | Norfolk Southern | 68 | 2581–2648 | Units 2591-2648 were all of the Flared Radiator Units with EMD's FIRE Cab. All sold to PRLX in 2020. Units 2596, 2598, 2607, 2608, 2613, 2616, 2620, 2622, 2637, 2645, 2648 sold to RJ Corman in Fall 2022. 5 units sold to Ontario Northland in 2022. Units 2601, 2605, 2611, 2612, 2614, 2621, 2623, 2628, 2635, and 2646 sold to Indiana Rail Road in 2023. |
| | Norfolk Southern | 3 | 2797–2799 | Units are ex-New York, Susquehanna & Western 4050, 4052, 4054. Acquired in September 2014, but later sold to PRLX in 2020. |
| | Union Pacific | 1,452 | 1616, 1776, 1979, 2001–2002, 3778–3984, 3986–4013, 4015, 4016–4140, 4142–4331, 4333–4391, 4393–4689, 4692–5231 | Units 2001-2002 are ex 4690–4691, 3778 is ex 4141, renumbered for SD70ACe 4141, and No. 3985 was skipped for steam locomotive 3985. Unit 4014, along with 4884, was given the honor of escorting UP's 4-8-8-4 Big Boy move to Cheyenne for restoration, and eventual return to the active roster. To avoid confusion, the "Big Boy" was renumbered UPP 4014. The SD70M has since been renumbered as UP 4479, becoming the second UP SD70M to carry that number as the first 4479 was retired after being wrecked. This renumbering allows the Big Boy to be numbered as UP 4014. • 9 units sold to Lake State Railway • Units 4120-4128 sold to Paducah & Louisville and Evansville Western • Units 4375 and 4672 sold to Herzog • 10 units sold to Tren Interoceanico • 4 units sold to Florida, Gulf and Atlantic Railroad • 3 units sold to Grenada Railroad • 6 units sold to Yadkin Valley Railroad • 4 units sold to Lancaster & Chester Railroad Units 2001 & 2002 were, and still are, painted in tribute of the 2002 Winter Olympics which took place in Salt Lake City, UT. Units 4545, 4811, and 4929 were all wrecked and retired in 2004. Unit 4332 renumbered to 1979 in 2021 and wears the We Are One livery. Unit 4015 (first) was a diesel helper for UP 4014, and was renumbered to 1616 to honor the 16th president, Abraham Lincoln, and was released on April 30, 2025. Unit 4392 was renumbered to 4015 (2nd) to replace the first 4015. Unit 4164 was renumbered to 1776, and unveiled in March 2026, in honor of the United States Semiquincentennial. It wears standard Union Pacific Armour Yellow and Harbor Mist Gray, with an American flag on each side of the locomotive, a Union Pacific shield on the front of the nose, and "America 250" logos adorning the sides of the nose plus the rear of the long hood. Unit 4547 (first) was renumbered to 4606 (2nd) to make room on the roster for ET44AC 4547, painted in honor of 45th and 47th U.S. President Donald Trump. |
| | PRLX (Progress Rail Leasing) | 25 | 4675–4699 | All units are former CSX and are also former EMDX demonstrators 7000–7024. 4675 and 4677 were sold to CORP in 2022. 4675 was the first SD70 series locomotive built. |
| | PRLX (Progress Rail Leasing) | 71 | 2581–2648, 2797–2799 | They are ex-Norfolk Southern 2581–2648 and 2797–2799 units. Purchased between March and April 2020. 10 units were sold to RJ Corman as of Fall 2022. 10 more units were sold to Indiana Rail Road in 2023. |
| | Ferrominera Orinoco | 6 | 1052–1057 | N/A |
| | Carajás Railroad (EFC) - Companhia Vale do Rio Doce | 55 | 701-755 | These are wide gauge 1,600 mm (5 ft 3 in) units. |
| | Lake State Railway | 9 | 1776, 6430–6437 | All are ex-UP units. Acquired in May 2022. Unit 6437 painted in a Pere Marquette-inspired livery. Unit 1776 unveiled in October 2025 in a patriotic red, white, and blue livery to commemorate 250 years of American independence. |
| | RJ Corman | 10 | 1973, 2023, 2596, 2598, 2613, 2616, 2620, 2622, 2637, 2645, 2648 | All units are former NS. Acquired in Fall 2022. Units 1973, 2023, 2596 & 2620 are painted in 50th anniversary scheme. |
| | Indiana Rail Road | 10 | 7001–7010 | All units are former NS. Unit 7001 is in Operation Lifesaver paint. Unit 7010 is in a veterans scheme. |
| | Paducah & Louisville Railway / Evansville Western | 9 | 4120-4128 | All units are former UP |
| | Southern Pacific | 25 | 9800-9824 | All to Union Pacific. Renumbered 3974–3984, 3986–3999 |
| | Ontario Northland Railway | 5 | 2120-2124 | Ex-NS 2631, 2642, 2633, 2639, 2644 |
| | Tren Interoceánico | 10 | 4376, 4378, 4380–4381, 4606–4607, 4611, 4666, 4671, 4674. | Ex-UP, same numbers |
SD70I
| | Canadian National | 26 | 5600–5625 | N/A |
SD70MAC
| | Alaska Railroad | 32 | 4001–4016, 4129–4130, 4317–4328, 8895, 8901 | The units numbered 4317–4328 have flared radiators for Tier 1 compliance and are equipped with head-end power (HEP) generators for passenger service. 4129, 4130 (ex-KCS) acquired in 2024, 8895, 8901 (ex-BNSF) acquired in 2025. |
| | BNSF | 786 | 8800–8989, 9400–9499, 9504–9999 | Units 9551-9564 sold to PRLX. 19 Units rebuilt into SD70MACe's. Unit 8945 sold to KCS. 30 units sold to WFRX. 4 units sold to Red River Valley and Western. 10 units sold to Colorado Pacific Rio Grande Railroad. 7 units sold to Quebec Gatineau Railway. 3 units sold to St. Lawrence & Atlantic Railroad. Unit 9540 sold to Yadkin Valley Railroad. Remaining units in storage. Only used as Yard unit, Backup Multiple Power unit and Distributed Power Unit. Units 8876 and 9724 were wrecked and scrapped. 9400 preserved. 9528 was rebuilt to a snow plow unit and renumbered to 95280. |
| | CSX | 220 | 4500–4589, 4701–4830 | The 4500s were originally numbered in the 700 series. 4575-4589 are ex-Conrail units. 145 Units rebuilt into SD70MACes. Units 4542, 4716, and 4759 were wrecked and retired, Units 4501–4506, 4510–4512, 4516–4520, 4522 and 4523 were sold to Four Rivers Transportation in 2013 and later ended up on both the Paducah and Louisville Railroad and one of its Subsidiaries The Evansville Western Railroad. Unit 4524 was retired in May 2022 after it was used as a parts donor. Units 4500, 4508–4509, 4513-4515 and 4521 were retired for parts and eventually scrapped in 2024. These are called SD70AC. Unit 4568 is painted in honour of Operation Livesaver's 50th anniversary. Unit 4720 is painted in a "One CSX" initiative scheme that honours the railroad's employees. Unit 4507 was rebuilt into a first responders training prop and renumbered 911343. |
| | Canadian Pacific Kansas City | 75 | KCS 3900–3902, 3904–3905, 3907, 3910–3916, 3918, 3920–3921, 3924–3926, 3928–3930, 3932, 3934–3935, 3937–3938, 3941–3942, 3944, 3946–3948, 3951, 3953, 3955, 3957, 3961–3964, 3966–3968, 3970, 3972–3974 | All are ex-Transportación Ferroviaria Mexicana (TFM) units. Some units rebuilt to SD70MACe. Unit 3974 is ex-BNSF 8945. Some units sold to Metra and rebuilt as SD70MACH. 3909 and 3946 sold to Alaska Railroad. 6 units sold to Ontario Northland |
| | Paducah & Louisville Railway / Evansville Western | 16 | 2012, 2013, 4501–4504, 4510–4512, 4516–4520, 4522, 4523 | Former CSX Units acquired in 2013 from Four Rivers Transportation. Units 4505 and 4506 were renumbered as 2012 and 2013 respectively. 2012 is painted in tribute to the University of Kentucky's Championship from 2012. While 2013 is painted in tribute to the University of Louisville's Championship from 2013. Unit 4522 is also painted in a University of Kentucky Paint Scheme that commemorates the years that the University of Kentucky has won an NCAA National Championship. Units 4501–4502, 4510–4511, 4517, 4519-4520 operate on the Evansville Western. |
| | PRLX (Progress Rail Leasing) | 14 | 9551-9564 | All units are ex-Burlington Northern and later BNSF. |
| | Wells Fargo Leasing (WFRX) | 30 | 8858, 8859, 8861–8868, 8870, 8871, 8877, 8895, 8898–8899, 8901, 8909, 8910, 8912, 8914, 8915, 8959-8966 | All are ex-BNSF. |
| | Yadkin Valley Railroad | 1 | 9540 | Ex-BNSF, BN |
| | Tren Interoceánico | At least 17 | SBZX 8900-series | Ex-BNSF, 17 units presumed on the way. |
SD70ACe
| | ArcelorMittal, operated by Cartier Railway | 5 | 9001-9005 | Delivered in May 2013. |
| | Arkansas & Missouri Railroad | 6 | 70-73, 7001–7002 | Units 70-72 are ex-EMDX 1201–1203, and were fitted with mock cab-mounted bells. 73 is ex-KCS 4028. 7001 and 7002 are ex-Tacoma Rail SD70ACe-P4's, and will presumably be renumbered as A&M units 74 and 75. |
| | BNSF | 640 | 8400–8499, 8520–8599, 8749–8799, 8990–9158, 9160–9399 | 9159 wrecked, rebuilt, and renumbered 8749. 9000 was wrecked and retired in 2021. 9330-9399 are Thundercab units. |
| | BNSF | 20 | 8500–8519 | They are the SD70ACe-P4 model. |
| | Canadian National | 4 | 8100-8103 | They are the SD70ACe-P6 model, also set up for Distributed Power operation. Previously in EMDX paint with CN logos, all now repainted. Units are ex-EMDX 1206, 1208–1210. |
| | Canadian Pacific Kansas City | 228 | KCS 3997–4224 | Units 3997–3999 are ex-EMD demonstrators. 4014 wrecked and was retired. 4028 sold to A&M as 73. In November 2018, 4006 was painted into a veterans scheme. In May 2020, 4009 was painted into a "Salute to Heroes" scheme. units 4014–4015, 4021–4022–4023, 4028, 4031–4032–4033, 4038, 4042, 4046, 4048, 4050 are retired. KCSM 4084 wrecked and retired. 4200–4224 built in 2015, they are not Tier 4 compliant and are thus restricted to Mexico. |
| | CSX | 20 | 4831–4850 | 4839 retired due to an alternator failure. All retired in 2017 and sold to Progress Rail (PRLX). |
| | Electro-Motive Diesel Leasing | 3 | 1207, 2012, 4223 | 1207 is the SD70ACe-P4 model. |
| | Ferromex | 97 | 4000-4096 | 4000, 4029, and 4063 were wrecked and retired. |
| | Ferromex | 34 | 4100–4133 | Built in 2015, these units are not Tier 4 compliant and are thus restricted to Mexico. 4119–4133 were assigned to Ferrosur and were specially equipped with experimental sheet-metal awnings, or "elephant ears," over the radiator air intakes to combat excess heat and enhance engine cooling in the many tunnels through which they had to operate. |
| | Luminant (formerly Texas Utitilies Generating Co., TUGX) | 2 | 5308–5309 | Units are ex-EMDX 1204 & 1205 respectively. |
| | Montana Rail Link | 29 | 4300–4319, 4400–4408 | 4316–4319 are ex BHP. |
| | Norfolk Southern | 175 | 1000–1174 | 1065–1074 and 1080 painted in special historic "heritage" schemes honoring important NS predecessor roads. |
| | Northshore Mining | 5 | 671–675 | Ex. Progress Rail CSX units 4832–4833, 4838–4839, 4848. |
| | Quebec North Shore & Labrador | 28 | 501–528 | Units 501-507 were built in December 2009; 508-513 were built in August 2011; and 514-523 were built in December 2012. 524-528 are ex BHP. |
| | Tacoma Rail | 2 | 7001–7002 | They are the SD70ACe-P4 model and are ex-EMDX 1211 & 1212. Sold to Arkansas and Missouri Railroad in late 2023. |
| | Union Pacific | 518 | 1111, 1982, 1983, 1988, 1989, 1995, 1996, 4141, 8309–8361, 8363–8378, 8380–8382, 8384–8395, 8397–8422, 8424–8823 | 1111, 4141, 1982, 1983, 1988, 1989, 1995, and 1996 are special painted units. 4141 donated to the Bush Presidential Library in 2019. Units 8315, 8485, 8491, 8542, 8551, 8692, and 8743 were wrecked and retired. |
| | Union Pacific | 281 | 1943, 8824–9025, 9027–9104 | These units have 8,000 lbs. of extra ballast for more tractive-effort and are classified by Union Pacific as SD70AH. Unit 9026 was renumbered 1943 "Spirit of the Union Pacific" in 2017. 1943, 8997–9025, and 9027–9104 are Tier 4 credit units. |
| | PRLX (Progress Rail Leasing) | 14 | 4831-4850 | All units are former CSX. 5 of 19 units sold to Northshore Mining. |
| | BHP | 10 | 4324–4333 | Originally intended for BNSF and purchased by BHP Billiton when on the production line. |
| | Fortescue | 10 | 722–732 | These are Tier 3 units. |
| | Demonstrator manufactured in Brazil | 3 | 7044–7046 | These are wide gauge 1,600 mm (5 ft 3 in)) units. |
SD70M-2
| | Canadian National | 190 | 8000–8024, 8800–8964 | All units are equipped for Distributed Power operation. 8952 became CN's Grand Trunk Western heritage unit in 2020. |
| | CaterParrott Railnet | 2 | 9000-9001 | Former NS 2657 and 2727. |
| | CIT Group | 3 | 140–142 | All are ex-EMDX demonstrators GM 74–76. |
| | Florida East Coast Railway | 8 | 100–107 | All eight units were returned to lessor in early 2015. Former FEC 100 & 102 now Providence & Worcester Railroad 4301 & 4302, respectively. Former FEC 101 & 103 now Vermont Railway 431 & 432, respectively. Remaining units sold to Florida Gulf & Atlantic Railroad. |
| | Florida Gulf & Atlantic Railroad | 4 | 104-107 | All are former Florida East Coast units. |
| | New Brunswick Southern Railway | 18 | 6401–6418 | All are former Norfolk Southern units, rebuilt with nose headlights. |
| | PRLX (Progress Rail Leasing) | 80 | N/A | All are former Norfolk Southern units. 4 sold to NYSW, 18 sold to NBSR, 2 sold to CPR. Some units to be reacquired by NS for SD70ICC rebuild cores. |
| | New York, Susquehanna and Western Railway | 4 | 4060, 4062, 4064, 4066 | All are former Norfolk Southern units. |
| | Norfolk Southern | 130 | 2649-2778 | 4 units sold to NYSW, 18 units sold to NBSR and rebuilt with nose headlights, 2 units sold to CaterParrott Railnet, 80 units sold to PRLX. Remaining 46 units stored as of 2020; those units were reactivated with units 2674 and 2686 being rebuilt to SD70ICCs 1250–1251 in 2023. Remaining units to be rebuilt into SD70ICCs as well. |
| | Providence & Worcester Railroad | 2 | 4301-4302 | All are Former Florida East Coast units. |
| | Vermont Railway | 2 | 431–432 | All are Former Florida East Coast units. |
SD70ACe-T4
| | CSX | 10 | 8900–8909 | Delivered July 2019. Leased and later returned to PRLX in 2023. |
| | Electro-Motive Diesel Leasing | 58 | 1501-1505, 1601-1610, 7200-7242 | N/A |
| | Union Pacific | 100 | 3000–3099 | N/A |
| | PRLX (Progress Rail Leasing) | 65 | 7201–7252, 8900–8909 | 10 units part of a cancelled NS SD70ACe-T4 order intended for delivery late 2019. Units 8900-8909 formerly leased to CSX. |
| | Canadian Pacific Kansas City | 65 | CP 5500-5564 | 30 to be delivered in 2026. |
| | Lake State Railway | 4 | 6451-6454 | Four units on order, former PRLX locomotives |
SD70ACe/LCi
| | BHP | 184 | 4300–4323, 4334–4497 | First 13 repatriated to the United States and sold to Chemin de fer Arnaud (4), Montana Rail Link (4) and Quebec North Shore & Labrador (5), and rebuilt to U.S. specs. |
| | Fortescue | 21 | 701–721 | N/A |
SD70ACS
| | Etihad Railway | 7 | TBA | Delivered 2013. |
| | Etihad Railway | 38 | TBA | Ordered Feb. 2020. |
| | Compagnie des Bauxites de Guinée | 10 | TBA | Ordered 10 units. |
| | Mauritania Railway | 6 | CC121-CC126 | Ordered 6 units. |
| | Saudi Railway Company | 25 | TBA | N/A |
SD70ACe-BB
| | Valor da Logística Integrada | 85 | 6192-6199, 8332–8393, 8429–8443 | They operate on the lines of Ferrovia Centro-Atlântica. An additional 16 locomotives was delivered in the first half of 2017. |
| | Demonstrator manufactured in Brazil | 2 | 8795–8796 | N/A |
SD70ACe/45
| | América Latina Logística, now Rumo Logística | 7 | 618–624 | N/A |
| | Eldorado Brasil | 21 | 9553–9573 | Operated by América Latina Logística. |
| | Valor da Logística Integrada | 44 | 6514-6527, 8169–8175, 8255–8265, 8653–8664, | Operate on the lines of Ferrovia Centro-Atlântica and Ferrovia Norte-Sul. |
| | MRS Logística | 4 | 618, 7044, 7046–7047 | N/A |
SD70IAC
| | Norfolk Southern | 50 | 1175–1183, 1185-1191, 1193-1194, 1196-1234, 1776, 2026, 250 | These are SD70ACe/SD70IAC units. SD70IAC units are SD70ACe T4C units with IAC="Individual Axle Control" and are called SD70IAC by NS. All have now been delivered. 1224–1234 delivered in 2022. Units 1230 and 1231 are designated as the main power for the Office Car Special (OCS) trains (also known as a business trains or inspection trains). Units 1776, 2026, 250 were renumbered from 1184, 1192, and 1195 in 2026 and are painted in 3 separate paint schemes to celebrate America's 250th birthday. |
SD70ACe/LW
No data currently
SD70ACU
| | Canadian Pacific Kansas City | 60 | CP 6644, 7000–7023, 7025–7059 | Rebuilt from CP's SD9043MACs that were in long-term storage, plus additional locomotives bought from Union Pacific. 7010–7019 are outfitted in retro liveries and 7020–7023 and 6644 are armed forces painted units; 6644 is painted as a tribute to D-Day. 7005 and 7011 wrecked in April 2023 and retired. |
| | Norfolk Southern | 110 | 7229–7313, 7315–7339 | Rebuilt from ex-UP and ex-CIT SD90MACs. 66 units sold to PRLX, 30 of the PRLX units sold to Ferromex in 2024. 7314 was renumbered to 7339 in 2018. |
| | Ferromex | 3 | 4164-4155-4158 | Ex PRLX/NS 7324.7251.7259 |
SD70ACC
| | Norfolk Southern | 52 | 1800–1851 | Rebuilt from ex-NS SD70s. 1832 wrecked in June 2020 when it hit a tractor trailer then derailed. Later returned to service without its nose painted. |
SD70MACe
| | BNSF | 19 | 9714, 9716–9718, 9721, 9725, 9728–9730, 9736, 9738, 9746, 9748–9750, 9752–9753, 9767 and 9769 | Units were rebuilt between 2015 and 2016. Units 9714 and 9716 are Ex Burlington Northern Units. |
| | CSX | 145 | 4525-4541, 4543–4589, 4701–4707, 4710–4715, 4717–4720, 4722–4726, 4728–4749, 4751–4758, 4760–4771, 4773–4775, 4781, 4782, 4784, 4789, 4790, 4794–4796, 4798, 4805, 4819, 4822, 4824 and 4829 | Rebuilding of the units began in 2019. Units have been rebuilt at CSX's Locomotive Shops in Huntington, West Virginia. As of 2024 all of the remaining units from the 4500 series have been rebuilt. Rebuilding of the Flared SD70MAC's began in 2023. Unit 4568 which is painted in honor of Operation Livesaver's 50th anniversary was released in 2022. Unit 4720 which was rebuilt in 2023 was sent to the Paint Shops in Waycross, Georgia in late 2024 to be repainted in the "One CSX" initiative scheme that honors the railroad's employees, the unit was released on New Year's Eve of 2024. These units are designated as SD70AC. As of 2026, the SD70MACe rebuild program has been canceled after 145 units have been rebuilt. |
| | Canadian Pacific Kansas City | 75 | KCS 3900–3902, 3904–3905, 3910–3916, 3918, 3920–3921, 3924–3926, 3928–3930, 3932, 3934–3935, 3937–3938, 3941–3942, 3944, 3946–3948, 3951, 3953, 3955, 3957, 3961–3964, 3966–3968, 3970, 3972–3974 | All are ex-Transportación Ferroviaria Mexicana (TFM) units. |
SD70MACH
| | Metra | 42 | 500-541 | 500-523 delivered. 524–541 in progress of rebuild. |
SD70ICC
| | Norfolk Southern | 2 | 1250-1251 | These locomotives were rebuilt from PRLX/NS SD70M-2 locomotives, numbered 2674 and 2686 respectively. They were rebuilt in late 2023 by Progress Rail. 96 units were ordered for 2027–2029. |

== Preservation ==
=== SD70MAC ===
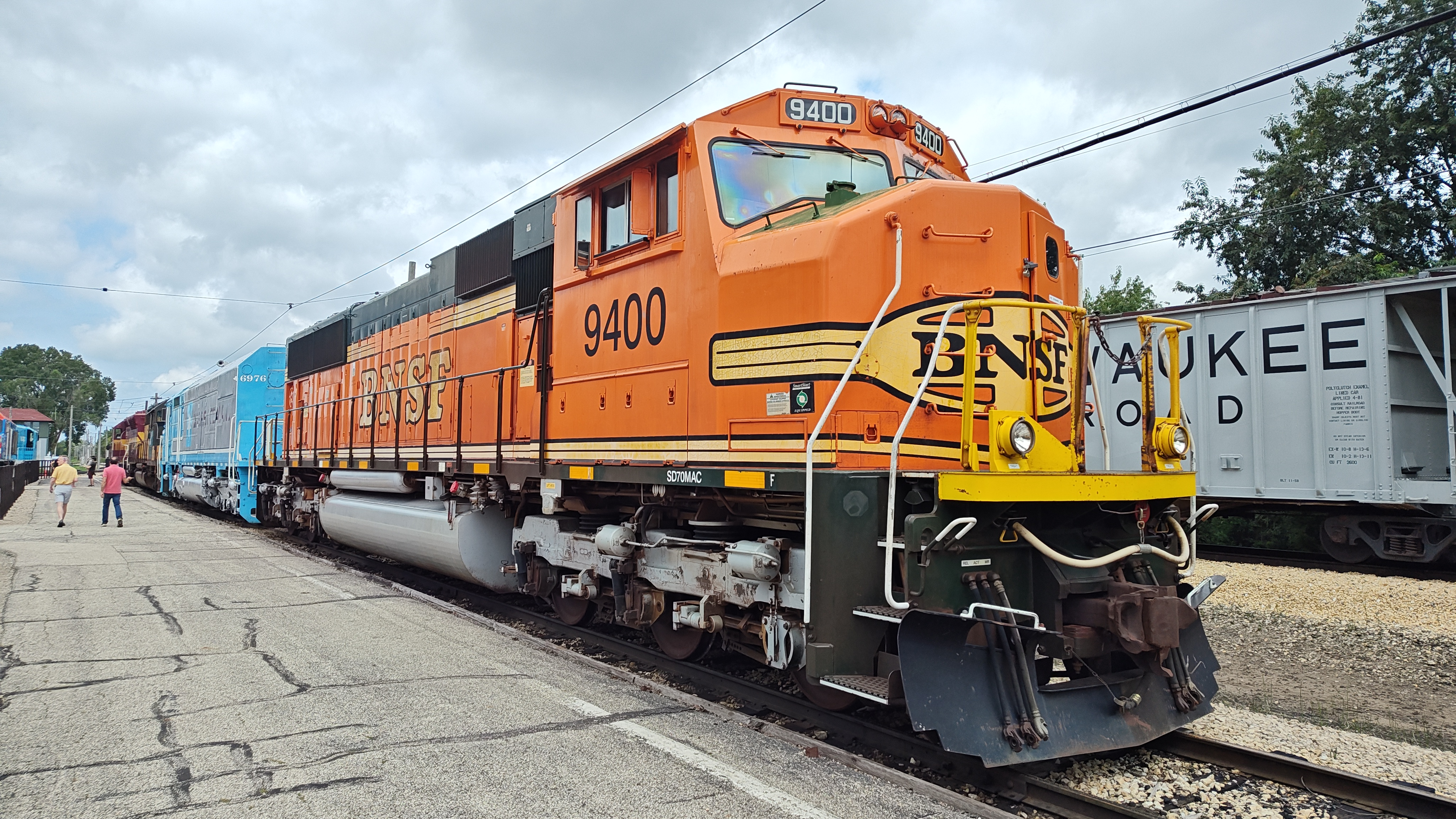
BNSF No. 9400 on display at the Illinois Railway Museum

- Burlington Northern No. 9400, the first production AC traction diesel and very first SD70MAC ever built, was donated to the Illinois Railway Museum by BNSF in June 2025. On July 18, 2026, the locomotive was returned to operating condition for the first time since being put into storage in 2017. It is the first SD70MAC to be preserved. The museum plans to eventually repaint it into its as-delivered Burlington Northern "Executive" livery.

=== SD70ACe ===
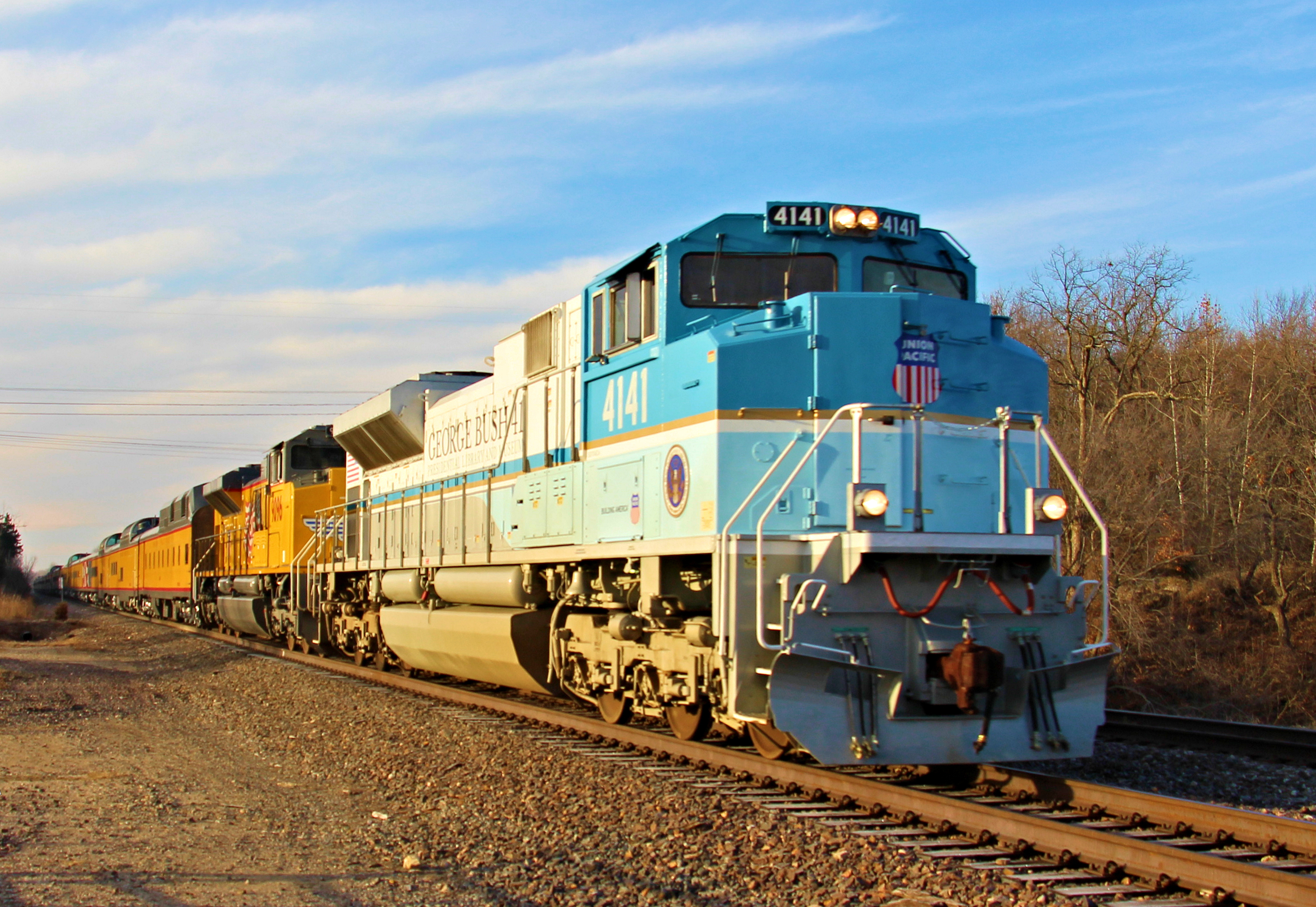
Union Pacific No. 4141 leading Bush's funeral train in 2018

- Union Pacific No. 4141 is preserved at the George H.W. Bush Presidential Library and Museum in College Station, Texas. The locomotive, painted in honor of George H. W. Bush, was unveiled in October 2005 and was in active service until 2009, when it was placed into storage due to the 2008 financial crisis. It was brought back in 2018 to participate in Bush's funeral train on December 6, 2018. The locomotive subsequently remained in active service following the funeral until its last run between November 8 and November 9, as part of the Union Pacific 4014 Southwest Tour, in which the plans for the display were unveiled. The locomotive arrived back at College Station on March 12, 2021, and the Marine One/4141 Locomotive Pavilion, where the 4141 is displayed, opened on June 13, 2024.
