= Sheboygan and Mississippi Railroad =

Overview
- Dates of operation: 1852–1861
- Successor: Sheboygan and Fond du Lac Railroad

Technical
- Track gauge: 1,435 mm (4 ft 8 1/2 in)
- Length: 19.6 miles (31.5 km)

The Sheboygan and Mississippi Railroad was a railroad company in the United States. It was incorporated in 1852 and opened its first line in 1859. In 1861, the company was reorganized as the Sheboygan and Fond du Lac Railroad. Its line, running from Sheboygan, Wisconsin, to Glenbeulah, Wisconsin, eventually became part of the Chicago and North Western Transportation Company system. The Sheboygan Falls Subdivision remains extant.

== History ==
The Sheboygan and Mississippi Railroad was incorporated on March 8, 1852. The company's goal was to construct a new railroad line from Sheboygan, Wisconsin, a port city on Lake Michigan, across the state of Wisconsin to Tomah, Wisconsin, on the Mississippi River. Groundbreaking took place in Sheboygan on June 4, 1856. The line opened between Sheboygan and Plymouth, Wisconsin, in June 1859. This was further extended to Glenbeulah, Wisconsin, in March 1860. The company had no connections to other railroads; the nearest was the Chicago and North Western Railway at Fond du Lac, Wisconsin, some 20 miles (32 km) to the west.

The company failed financially and on March 2, 1861, was reorganized as the Sheboygan and Fond du Lac Railroad.

== Lines ==
The company's line ran 19.6 miles (31.5 km) from Sheboygan to Glenbeulah. Ownership of the line between Sheboygan and Plymouth, now called the Sheboygan Falls Subdivision, is split between the Union Pacific Railroad and the Wisconsin and Southern Railroad. The line west of Plymouth was abandoned in 1952.
