= Sheboygan and Fond du Lac Railroad =

Railroad in Wisconsin from Sheboygan to Princeton

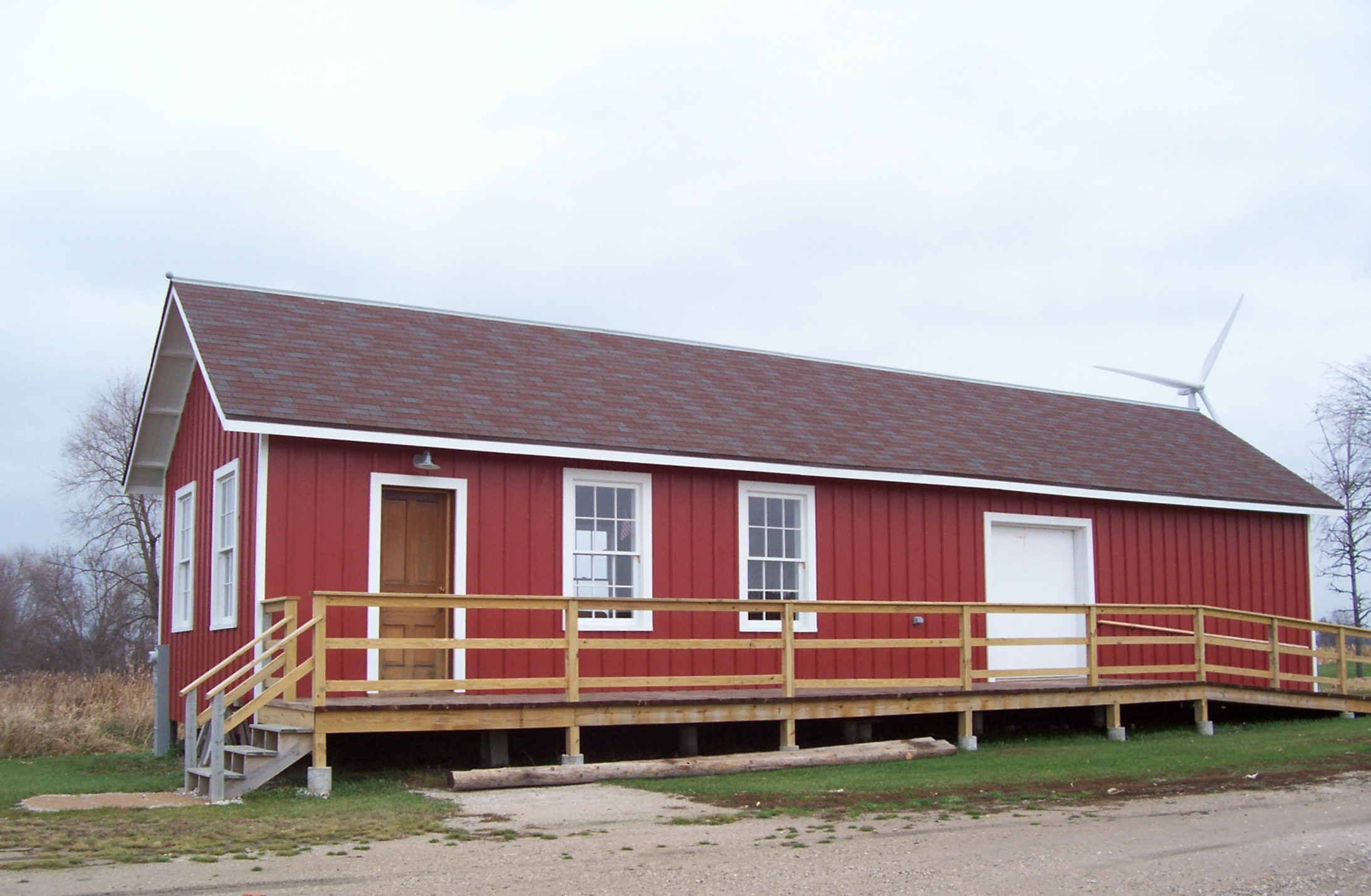
- The former depot in Malone, Wisconsin

Overview
- Dates of operation: 1861–1880
- Predecessor: Sheboygan and Mississippi Railroad
- Successor: Sheboygan and Western Railway

Technical
- Track gauge: 1,435 mm (4 ft 8 1/2 in)
- Length: 78.40 miles (126.17 km)

The Sheboygan and Fond du Lac Railroad was a railroad company in the United States. It was incorporated in 1861 to acquire the bankrupt Sheboygan and Mississippi Railroad, which owned a railway line running between Sheboygan, Wisconsin, and Glenbeulah, Wisconsin. The Sheboygan and Fond du Lac Railroad expanded the line first to Fond du Lac, Wisconsin, and then on to Princeton, Wisconsin. The company was reorganized as the Sheboygan and Western Railway in 1880. Its line eventually became part of the Chicago and North Western Transportation Company system; only the original line of the Sheboygan and Mississippi Railroad remains extant.

== History ==
The Sheboygan and Mississippi Railroad, incorporated in 1852, had completed a line from Sheboygan, Wisconsin, to Glenbeulah, Wisconsin, by 1860. This line had no connections to other railroads; goods were shipped out from the port in Sheboygan, on Lake Michigan. That company failed and was sold to the new Sheboygan and Fond du Lac Railroad, which was incorporated on March 2, 1861.

The new company expanded the existing line westward, reaching Fond du Lac, Wisconsin, in 1868. There, it interchanged with the Chicago and North Western Railway. A further expansion occurred in 1871, with the construction of an extension west to Princeton, Wisconsin. The company was reorganized as the Sheboygan and Western Railway on April 6, 1880.

== Lines ==
The company's line ran 78.40 miles (126.17 km) from Sheboygan to Princeton via Fond du Lac. The Princeton and North Western Railway extended it a further 85 miles (137 km) to Marshfield, Wisconsin, in 1901. Under the Chicago and North Western Railway, the line between Plymouth and Fond du Lac was abandoned in 1952. The line west of Fond du Lac, known as the Marshline Subdivision, was abandoned in stages between 1975–1985. The Sheboygan Falls Subdivision, between Plymouth and Sheboygan, is the only remaining extant line.
