= Member of congress =

Essential office of an elected members called congress

A member of congress (MOC), also known as a congressman, congresswoman or congressperson is a person who has been appointed or elected and inducted into an official body called a congress, typically to represent a particular constituency in a legislature. The term member of parliament (MP) is an equivalent term within a parliamentary system of government.

== Philippines ==
In the Congress of the Philippines, the title member of congress is almost never used; instead, legislators are called congressmen or congresswomen. However, these terms apply only to members of the House of Representatives, not to members of the Senate, who are called senators.

== United States ==
In referring to an individual lawmaker's capacity of serving in the United States Congress, a bicameral federal legislature, the term member of congress is used less often than other terms in the United States. This is because in the United States, the word Congress is used as a descriptive term for the collective body of legislators from both of its houses: the Senate and the House of Representatives.

While a member of the Senate is typically referred to as Senator (followed by "name from state"), (Note: For example, Senator John McCain from Arizona) a member of the House of Representatives is typically referred to as Congressman or Congresswoman (followed by "name from state's nth district"); (Note: For example, Congresswoman Pat Schroeder from Colorado's 1st district) or, removing any ambiguity, Representative ("name from state's nth district"). (Note: For example, Representative Barbara Jordan from Texas's 18th district) Although senators are members of Congress, they are not normally referred to or addressed as "congressman" or "congresswoman".

Members of Congress in both houses are elected by direct popular vote. Senators are elected via a statewide vote and Representatives by votes in each congressional district. Congressional districts are apportioned to the states, once every ten years, based on population figures from the most recent nationwide census. Each of the 435 members of the House of Representatives is elected to serve a two-year term representing the people of that person's district. Each state, regardless of its size, has at least one representative. Each of the 100 members of the Senate is elected to serve a six-year term representing the people of that person's state. Each state, regardless of its size, has two senators. Senatorial terms are staggered, so every two years approximately one-third of the Senate is up for election. Each staggered group of one-third of the senators is called a "class". No state has both its senators in the same class.

=== History of the United States Congress ===
The United States Congress was created in Article I of the Constitution, which laid out the limitations and powers of Congress. Article I grants Congress legislative power, lists the enumerated powers and allows Congress to make laws that are necessary and proper to carry out the enumerated powers. It specifies the election and composition of the House of Representatives, and the election and composition of the Senate, and the qualifications necessary to serve in each chamber.

The Seventeenth Amendment changed how senators were elected. Originally, senators were elected by state legislatures. The Seventeenth Amendment changed this to senators being elected directly by popular vote.

Controversy surrounds the question of whether the federal government or any other governmental entity has the right to regulate how many times representatives and senators can hold office.

== See also ==
- Non-voting members of the United States House of Representatives
- Shadow congressperson
