= List of current United States representatives =

This is a list of individuals serving in the United States House of Representatives (as of September 2, 2026, the 119th Congress). The membership of the House comprises 435 seats for representatives from the 50 states, apportioned by population, as well as six seats for non-voting delegates from U.S. territories and the District of Columbia. As of September 2, 2026, there are 433 representatives and 2 vacancies.

== Leadership ==
=== Presiding officer ===
Office	Name	District	Party	Since
Speaker of the House	Mike Johnson	LA-04	Republican	October 25, 2023; Party leader since October 25, 2023

=== Majority leadership (Republican) ===
Office	Name	District	Since
House Majority Leader Chair of the House Republican Steering Committee	Steve Scalise	LA-01	January 3, 2023; Party deputy since January 3, 2019
House Majority Whip	Tom Emmer	MN-06	January 3, 2023
Chair of the House Republican Conference	Lisa McClain	MI-09	January 3, 2025
Chair of the National Republican Congressional Committee	Richard Hudson	NC-09	January 3, 2023
Chair of the House Republican Policy Committee	Jay Obernolte	CA-23	April 15, 2026
Vice Chair of the House Republican Conference	Blake Moore	UT-01	November 8, 2023
Secretary of the House Republican Conference	Erin Houchin	IN-09	January 3, 2025
House Republican Chief Deputy Whip	Guy Reschenthaler	PA-14	January 3, 2023
Chair of House Republican Leadership	Elise Stefanik	NY-21	April 9, 2025
House Republican Elected Leadership Committee Sophomore Representative	Russell Fry	SC-07	January 3, 2025
House Republican Elected Leadership Committee Freshman Representative	Riley Moore	WV-02	January 3, 2025

=== Minority leadership (Democratic) ===
Office	Name	District	Since
House Minority Leader	Hakeem Jeffries	NY-08	January 3, 2023; Party leader since January 3, 2023
House Minority Whip	Katherine Clark	MA-05	January 3, 2023; Party deputy since January 3, 2023
Chair of the House Democratic Caucus	Pete Aguilar	CA-33	January 3, 2023
House Democratic Assistant Leader	Joe Neguse	CO-02	March 20, 2024
Vice Chair of the House Democratic Caucus	Ted Lieu	CA-36	January 3, 2023
Chair of the Democratic Congressional Campaign Committee	Suzan DelBene	WA-01	January 3, 2023
Chair of the House Democratic Policy and Communications Committee	Debbie Dingell	MI-06	April 16, 2024
Co-Chairs of the House Democratic Policy and Communications Committee	Maxwell Frost	FL-10	January 3, 2025
Co-Chairs of the House Democratic Policy and Communications Committee	Lori Trahan	MA-03	November 29, 2023
Co-Chairs of the House Democratic Policy and Communications Committee	Lauren Underwood	IL-14	January 3, 2023
House Democratic Junior Caucus Leadership Representative	Steven Horsford	NV-04	July 23, 2025
House Democratic Battleground Leadership Representative	Susie Lee	NV-03	January 3, 2025
House Democratic Freshman Class Leadership Representative	Luz Rivas	CA-29	January 3, 2025
Co-Chairs of the House Democratic Steering and Policy Committee	Nanette Barragán	CA-44	January 3, 2025
Co-Chairs of the House Democratic Steering and Policy Committee	Robin Kelly	IL-02	January 3, 2025
Co-Chairs of the House Democratic Steering and Policy Committee	Debbie Wasserman Schultz	FL-25	January 3, 2023

== Regional membership ==
As of September 2, 2026:
Region	Democrats	Republicans	Vacant	Total	States included
New England	21	0	0	21	CT, MA, ME, NH, RI, VT
Mid-Atlantic	43	23	0	66	DE, MD, NJ, NY, PA, WV
Great Lakes	33	37	0	70	IL, IN, MI, MN, OH, WI
Great Plains	3	18	0	21	IA, KS, MO, ND, NE, SD
South Atlantic	23	50	1	74	FL, GA, NC, SC, VA
South Central	20	58	1	79	AL, AR, KY, LA, MS, OK, TN, TX
Mountain	13	20	0	33	AZ, CO, ID, MT, NM, NV, UT, WY
Pacific	58	13	0	71	AK, CA, HI, OR, WA
Total	214	219	2	435	

== Vacancies ==
- Texas 23: Tony Gonzales (R) resigned on April 14, 2026. Governor Abbott declined to call a special election for the seat before the 2026 midterm elections.
- Florida 20: Sheila Cherfilus-McCormick (D) resigned on April 21, 2026. Governor DeSantis declined to call a special election for the seat before the 2026 midterm elections.

== Partisan affiliation by state ==
As of September 2, 2026, Republicans control 30 state delegations and Democrats control 18 state delegations. Two state delegations (Colorado and Minnesota) are evenly split.

Partisan affiliation by state

State ranked in partisan order	Percentage Republicans	Percentage Democrats	Percentage vacant	Republican/ Democratic/ vacant	Republican seat plurality	Notes
Oklahoma	100%	0%	0%	5/0/0	+5	
Arkansas	100%	0%	0%	4/0/0	+4	
Iowa	100%	0%	0%	4/0/0	+4	
Utah	100%	0%	0%	4/0/0	+4	
Nebraska	100%	0%	0%	3/0/0	+3	
Idaho	100%	0%	0%	2/0/0	+2	
Montana	100%	0%	0%	2/0/0	+2	
West Virginia	100%	0%	0%	2/0/0	+2	
Alaska	100%	0%	0%	1/0/0	+1	
North Dakota	100%	0%	0%	1/0/0	+1	
South Dakota	100%	0%	0%	1/0/0	+1	
Wyoming	100%	0%	0%	1/0/0	+1	
Tennessee	89%	11%	0%	8/1/0	+7	
South Carolina	86%	14%	0%	6/1/0	+5	
Kentucky	83%	17%	0%	5/1/0	+4	
Indiana	78%	22%	0%	7/2/0	+5	
Missouri	75%	25%	0%	6/2/0	+4	
Wisconsin	75%	25%	0%	6/2/0	+4	
Kansas	75%	25%	0%	3/1/0	+2	
Mississippi	75%	25%	0%	3/1/0	+2	
Florida	71%	25%	4%	20/7/1	+13	FL-20: Vacant following Congresswoman Cherfilus-McCormick's resignation on April 21, 2026.
North Carolina	71%	29%	0%	10/4/0	+6	
Alabama	71%	29%	0%	5/2/0	+3	
Ohio	67%	33%	0%	10/5/0	+5	
Arizona	67%	33%	0%	6/3/0	+3	
Louisiana	67%	33%	0%	4/2/0	+2	
Georgia	64%	36%	0%	9/5/0	+4	
Texas	63%	34%	3%	24/13/1	+11	TX-23: Vacant following Congressman Gonzales's resignation on April 14, 2026.
Pennsylvania	59%	41%	0%	10/7/0	+3	
Michigan	54%	46%	0%	7/6/0	+1	
Colorado	50%	50%	0%	4/4/0	0	
Minnesota	50%	50%	0%	4/4/0	0	
Virginia	45%	55%	0%	5/6/0	-1	
New York	27%	73%	0%	7/19/0	-12	
Nevada	25%	75%	0%	1/3/0	-2	
New Jersey	25%	75%	0%	3/9/0	-6	
Washington	20%	80%	0%	2/8/0	-6	
Illinois	18%	82%	0%	3/14/0	-11	
California	17%	83%	0%	9/43/0	-34	
Oregon	17%	83%	0%	1/5/0	-4	
Maryland	13%	87%	0%	1/7/0	-6	
Delaware	0%	100%	0%	0/1/0	-1	
Vermont	0%	100%	0%	0/1/0	-1	
Hawaii	0%	100%	0%	0/2/0	-2	
Maine	0%	100%	0%	0/2/0	-2	
New Hampshire	0%	100%	0%	0/2/0	-2	
Rhode Island	0%	100%	0%	0/2/0	-2	
New Mexico	0%	100%	0%	0/3/0	-3	
Connecticut	0%	100%	0%	0/5/0	-5	
Massachusetts	0%	100%	0%	0/9/0	-9	
House of Representatives	50.3%	49.2%	0.5%	219/214/2	+5	
State ranked in partisan order	Percentage Republicans	Percentage Democrats	Percentage vacant	Republican/ Democratic/ vacant	Republican seat plurality	Notes

== List of representatives ==
List of representatives as of September 2, 2026:
District	Member	Party	Born	Prior experience	Education	Assumed office	Residence	Length of service
Alabama 1	Barry Moore	Republican	September 26, 1966 (age 60)	Alabama House of Representatives	Enterprise State Community College (AS); Auburn University (BS)	January 3, 2021	Enterprise	5 years, 320 days
Alabama 2	Shomari Figures	Democratic	September 3, 1985 (age 41)	Deputy Chief of Staff to the U.S. Attorney General; U.S. Senate staffer White House liaison to the Department of Justice; Domestic Director of the Presidential Personnel Office; Political organizer Law clerk	University of Alabama (BA, JD)	January 3, 2025	Mobile	1 year, 320 days
Alabama 3	Mike Rogers	Republican	July 16, 1958 (age 68)	Calhoun County Commissioner; Alabama House of Representatives	Jacksonville State University (BA, MPA); Birmingham School of Law (JD)	January 3, 2003	Weaver	23 years, 320 days
Alabama 4	Robert Aderholt	Republican	July 22, 1965 (age 61)	Haleyville Municipal Judge	University of North Alabama; Birmingham–Southern College (BA); Samford University (JD)	January 3, 1997	Haleyville	29 years, 320 days
Alabama 5	Dale Strong	Republican	May 8, 1970 (age 56)	Madison County Commission Chairman	Athens State University (BA)	January 3, 2023	Huntsville	3 years, 320 days
Alabama 6	Gary Palmer	Republican	May 14, 1954 (age 72)	Policy analyst	University of Alabama (BS)	January 3, 2015	Hoover	11 years, 320 days
Alabama 7	Terri Sewell	Democratic	January 1, 1965 (age 61)	Attorney	Princeton University (BA); St Hilda's College, Oxford (MA); Harvard University (JD)	January 3, 2011	Birmingham	15 years, 320 days
Alaska at-large	Nick Begich III	Republican	October 27, 1977 (age 49)	Businessman; Alaska Policy Forum Board of Directors; Alaska Republican Party Finance Committee co-chair	Baylor University (BBA); Indiana University Bloomington (MBA)	January 3, 2025	Chugiak	1 year, 320 days
Arizona 1	David Schweikert	Republican	March 3, 1962 (age 64)	Arizona House of Representatives; Arizona Board of Education; Arizona Board of Equalization; Maricopa County Treasurer	Arizona State University, Tempe (BS, MBA)	January 3, 2011	Fountain Hills	15 years, 320 days
Arizona 2	Eli Crane	Republican	January 3, 1980 (age 46)	U.S. Navy; Businessman	Arizona Western College; University of Arizona	January 3, 2023	Oro Valley	3 years, 320 days
Arizona 3	Yassamin Ansari	Democratic	April 7, 1992 (age 34)	Vice Mayor of Phoenix	Stanford University (BA); St. John's College, Cambridge (MPhil)	January 3, 2025	Phoenix	1 year, 320 days
Arizona 4	Greg Stanton	Democratic	March 8, 1970 (age 56)	Mayor of Phoenix; Member of the Phoenix City Council	Marquette University (BA); University of Michigan (JD)	January 3, 2019	Phoenix	7 years, 320 days
Arizona 5	Andy Biggs	Republican	November 7, 1958 (age 68)	President of the Arizona Senate; Arizona House of Representatives	Brigham Young University (BA); University of Arizona (JD); Arizona State University, Phoenix (MA)	January 3, 2017	Gilbert	9 years, 320 days
Arizona 6	Juan Ciscomani	Republican	August 31, 1982 (age 44)	University of Arizona senior program development specialist Tucson Hispanic Chamber of Commerce Vice President of Outreach; Senior Advisor for Regional and International Affairs to Arizona Governor Doug Ducey	Pima Community College; University of Arizona (BA)	January 3, 2023	Tucson	3 years, 320 days
Arizona 7	Adelita Grijalva	Democratic	October 30, 1970 (age 56)	Pima County Board of Supervisors	University of Arizona (BA)	November 12, 2025 (special)	Tucson	1 year, 7 days
Arizona 8	Abraham Hamadeh	Republican	May 15, 1991 (age 35)	U.S. Army Reserve; Maricopa County Prosecutor	Arizona State University (BA); University of Arizona (JD)	January 3, 2025	Phoenix	1 year, 320 days
Arizona 9	Paul Gosar	Republican	November 27, 1958 (age 67)	President of the Northern Arizona Dental Society	Creighton University (BS, DDS)	January 3, 2011	Bullhead City	15 years, 320 days
Arkansas 1	Rick Crawford	Republican	January 22, 1966 (age 60)	Broadcaster; Businessman	Arkansas State University (BS)	January 3, 2011	Jonesboro	15 years, 320 days
Arkansas 2	French Hill	Republican	December 5, 1956 (age 69)	Businessman	Vanderbilt University (BS)	January 3, 2015	Little Rock	11 years, 320 days
Arkansas 3	Steve Womack	Republican	February 18, 1957 (age 69)	Mayor of Rogers	Arkansas Tech University (BA)	January 3, 2011	Rogers	15 years, 320 days
Arkansas 4	Bruce Westerman	Republican	November 18, 1967 (age 59)	Majority Leader of the Arkansas House of Representatives	University of Arkansas (BS); Yale University (MS)	January 3, 2015	Hot Springs	11 years, 320 days
California 1	James Gallagher	Republican	March 4, 1981 (age 45)	Minority Leader of the California State Assembly	University of California, Berkeley (BA); University of California, Davis (JD)	June 10, 2026 (special)	East Nicolaus	162 days
California 2	Jared Huffman	Democratic	February 18, 1964 (age 62)	California State Assembly	University of California, Santa Barbara (BA); Boston College (JD)	January 3, 2013	San Rafael	13 years, 320 days
California 3	Kevin Kiley	Independent (Note: Elected as a Republican switched to independent in 2026, caucus's with Republicans for Committee Assignments)	January 30, 1985 (age 41)	California State Assembly; Educator	Harvard University (BA); Yale University (JD); Loyola Marymount University (MA)	January 3, 2023	Rocklin	3 years, 320 days
California 4	Mike Thompson	Democratic	January 24, 1951 (age 75)	California State Senate	Napa Valley College; California State University, Chico (BA, MPA)	January 3, 1999	St. Helena	27 years, 320 days
California 5	Tom McClintock	Republican	July 10, 1956 (age 70)	California Senate; California State Assembly	University of California, Los Angeles (BA)	January 3, 2009	Elk Grove	17 years, 320 days
California 6	Ami Bera	Democratic	March 2, 1965 (age 61)	Chief Medical Officer of Sacramento County	University of California, Irvine (BS, MD)	January 3, 2013	Elk Grove	13 years, 320 days
California 7	Doris Matsui	Democratic	September 25, 1944 (age 82)	Sacramento City Council	University of California, Berkeley (BA)	March 10, 2005 (special)	Sacramento	21 years, 254 days
California 8	John Garamendi	Democratic	January 24, 1945 (age 81)	United States Deputy Secretary of the Interior; Lieutenant Governor of California; California Insurance Commissioner; California State Senate; California State Assembly	University of California, Berkeley (BA); Harvard University (MBA)	November 5, 2009 (special)	Walnut Grove	17 years, 14 days
California 9	Josh Harder	Democratic	August 1, 1986 (age 40)	Venture capitalist Professor	Stanford University (BA); Harvard University (MBA, MPP)	January 3, 2019	Tracy	7 years, 320 days
California 10	Mark DeSaulnier	Democratic	March 31, 1952 (age 74)	California State Senate; California State Assembly; Contra Costa County Board of Supervisors	College of the Holy Cross (BA)	January 3, 2015	Concord	11 years, 320 days
California 11	Nancy Pelosi	Democratic	March 26, 1940 (age 86)	California Democratic Party Chair	Trinity Washington University (BA)	June 2, 1987 (special)	San Francisco	39 years, 170 days
California 12	Lateefah Simon	Democratic	January 29, 1977 (age 49)	San Francisco BART Board of Directors	Mills College (BA); University of San Francisco (MPA)	January 3, 2025	Emeryville	1 year, 320 days
California 13	Adam Gray	Democratic	September 23, 1977 (age 49)	California State Assembly	Merced College; University of California, Santa Barbara (BA)	January 3, 2025	Merced	1 year, 320 days
California 14	Aisha Wahab	Democratic	January 11, 1987 (age 39)	California Senate; Hayward City Council	Ohlone College; San Jose State University (BA); California State University, East Bay (MBA); University of Southern California (DSW)	September 2, 2026 (special)	Hayward	78 days
California 15	Kevin Mullin	Democratic	June 15, 1970 (age 56)	Speaker pro tempore of the California State Assembly; South San Francisco City Council	University of San Francisco (BA); San Francisco State University (MPA)	January 3, 2023	South San Francisco	3 years, 320 days
California 16	Sam Liccardo	Democratic	April 16, 1970 (age 56)	Mayor of San Jose; San Jose City Council	Georgetown University (BA); Harvard University (MPP, JD)	January 3, 2025	San Jose	1 year, 320 days
California 17	Ro Khanna	Democratic	September 13, 1976 (age 50)	Attorney; Author; Educator	University of Chicago (BA); Yale University (JD)	January 3, 2017	Fremont	9 years, 320 days
California 18	Zoe Lofgren	Democratic	December 21, 1947 (age 78)	Santa Clara County Board of Supervisors	Stanford University (BA); Santa Clara University (JD)	January 3, 1995	San Jose	31 years, 320 days
California 19	Jimmy Panetta	Democratic	October 1, 1969 (age 57)	Deputy district attorney of Monterey County	Monterey Peninsula College; University of California, Davis (BA); Santa Clara University (JD)	January 3, 2017	Carmel Valley	9 years, 320 days
California 20	Vince Fong	Republican	October 24, 1979 (age 47)	California State Assembly; Congressional aide	University of California, Los Angeles (BA); Princeton University (MPA)	June 3, 2024 (special)	Bakersfield	2 years, 169 days
California 21	Jim Costa	Democratic	April 13, 1952 (age 74)	California State Senate; California State Assembly	California State University, Fresno (BA)	January 3, 2005	Fresno	21 years, 320 days
California 22	David Valadao	Republican	April 14, 1977 (age 49)	U.S. House; California State Assembly	College of the Sequoias	January 3, 2021	Hanford	5 years, 320 days
California 23	Jay Obernolte	Republican	August 18, 1970 (age 56)	California State Assembly; Mayor of Big Bear Lake; Big Bear Lake City Councilman	California Institute of Technology (BS); University of California, Los Angeles (MS)	January 3, 2021	Big Bear Lake	5 years, 320 days
California 24	Salud Carbajal	Democratic	November 18, 1964 (age 62)	Santa Barbara County Board of Supervisors	University of California, Santa Barbara (BA); Fielding Graduate University (MA)	January 3, 2017	Santa Barbara	9 years, 320 days
California 25	Raul Ruiz	Democratic	August 25, 1972 (age 54)	Emergency physician	University of California, Los Angeles (BS); Harvard University (MD, MPP, MPH)	January 3, 2013	Indio	13 years, 320 days
California 26	Julia Brownley	Democratic	August 28, 1952 (age 74)	California State Assembly	George Washington University (BA); American University (MBA)	January 3, 2013	Westlake Village	13 years, 320 days
California 27	George Whitesides	Democratic	March 3, 1974 (age 52)	NASA Chief of Staff	Princeton University (BA); King's College, Cambridge (MPhil)	January 3, 2025	Agua Dulce	1 year, 320 days
California 28	Judy Chu	Democratic	July 7, 1953 (age 73)	Mayor of Monterey Park; Monterey Park City Council; California State Assembly; California State Board of Equalization	University of California, Los Angeles (BA); Alliant International University (MA, PhD)	July 14, 2009 (special)	Monterey Park	17 years, 128 days
California 29	Luz Rivas	Democratic	February 6, 1974 (age 52)	California Assembly	Massachusetts Institute of Technology (BS); Harvard University (MEd)	January 3, 2025	Los Angeles	1 year, 320 days
California 30	Laura Friedman	Democratic	December 3, 1966 (age 59)	California Assembly; Mayor of Glendale Film producer	University of Rochester (BA)	January 3, 2025	Glendale	1 year, 320 days
California 31	Gil Cisneros	Democratic	February 12, 1971 (age 55)	Under Secretary of Defense for Personnel and Readiness; U.S. House; U.S. Navy	George Washington University (BA); Regis University (MBA); Brown University (MA)	January 3, 2025	Covina	1 year, 320 days
California 32	Brad Sherman	Democratic	October 24, 1954 (age 72)	California Board of Equalization	University of California, Los Angeles (BA); Harvard University (JD)	January 3, 1997	Los Angeles	29 years, 320 days
California 33	Pete Aguilar	Democratic	June 19, 1979 (age 47)	Mayor of Redlands	University of Redlands (BS)	January 3, 2015	Redlands	11 years, 320 days
California 34	Jimmy Gomez	Democratic	November 25, 1974 (age 51)	California State Assembly	University of California, Los Angeles (BA); Harvard University (MPP)	July 11, 2017 (special)	Los Angeles	9 years, 320 days
California 35	Norma Torres	Democratic	April 4, 1965 (age 61)	California State Senate; California State Assembly; Mayor of Pomona	National Labor College (BA)	January 3, 2015	Pomona	11 years, 320 days
California 36	Ted Lieu	Democratic	March 29, 1969 (age 57)	California State Senate; California State Assembly	Stanford University (BA, BS); Georgetown University (JD)	January 3, 2015	Torrance	11 years, 320 days
California 37	Sydney Kamlager-Dove	Democratic	July 20, 1972 (age 54)	California State Senate; California State Assembly; Los Angeles Community College District Board of Trustees	Compton College; University of Southern California (BA); Carnegie Mellon University (MA)	January 3, 2023	Los Angeles	3 years, 320 days
California 38	Linda Sánchez	Democratic	January 28, 1969 (age 57)	Attorney	University of California, Berkeley (BA); University of California, Los Angeles (JD)	January 3, 2003	Whittier	23 years, 320 days
California 39	Mark Takano	Democratic	December 10, 1960 (age 65)	Teacher	Harvard University (BA); University of California, Riverside (MFA)	January 3, 2013	Riverside	13 years, 320 days
California 40	Young Kim	Republican	October 18, 1962 (age 64)	California State Assembly	University of Southern California (BBA)	January 3, 2021	Anaheim Hills	5 years, 320 days
California 41	Ken Calvert	Republican	June 8, 1953 (age 73)	Real estate executive	Chaffey College; San Diego State University (BA)	January 3, 1993	Corona	33 years, 320 days
California 42	Robert Garcia	Democratic	December 2, 1977 (age 48)	Mayor of Long Beach; Long Beach City Council	California State University, Long Beach (BA, EdD); University of Southern California (MA)	January 3, 2023	Long Beach	3 years, 320 days
California 43	Maxine Waters	Democratic	August 15, 1938 (age 88)	California State Assembly	California State University, Los Angeles (BA)	January 3, 1991	Los Angeles	35 years, 320 days
California 44	Nanette Barragán	Democratic	September 15, 1976 (age 50)	Hermosa Beach City Council	University of California, Los Angeles (BA); University of Southern California (JD)	January 3, 2017	Los Angeles	9 years, 320 days
California 45	Derek Tran	Democratic	December 22, 1980 (age 45)	Lawyer; Consultant; Policy analyst U.S. Army	Bentley University (BS); Glendale University College of Law (JD)	January 3, 2025	Orange	1 year, 320 days
California 46	Lou Correa	Democratic	January 24, 1958 (age 68)	California State Senate; Orange County Board of Supervisors; California State Assembly	California State University, Fullerton (BA); University of California, Los Angeles (JD, MBA)	January 3, 2017	Santa Ana	9 years, 320 days
California 47	Dave Min	Democratic	March 5, 1976 (age 50)	California State Senate; Staff Attorney at the U.S. Securities and Exchange Commission	University of Pennsylvania (BA); Harvard University (JD)	January 3, 2025	Irvine	1 year, 320 days
California 48	Darrell Issa	Republican	November 1, 1953 (age 73)	U.S. House; CEO of Directed Electronics	Siena Heights University (BA)	January 3, 2021	Escondido	5 years, 320 days
California 49	Mike Levin	Democratic	October 20, 1978 (age 48)	Environmental activist	Stanford University (BA); Duke University (JD)	January 3, 2019	San Juan Capistrano	7 years, 320 days
California 50	Scott Peters	Democratic	June 17, 1958 (age 68)	San Diego City Council; San Diego Port Commission	Duke University (BA); New York University (JD)	January 3, 2013	San Diego	13 years, 320 days
California 51	Sara Jacobs	Democratic	February 1, 1989 (age 37)	Nonprofit founder Policy advisor	Columbia University (BA, MIA)	January 3, 2021	San Diego	5 years, 320 days
California 52	Juan Vargas	Democratic	March 7, 1961 (age 65)	California State Senate; California State Assembly; San Diego City Council	University of San Diego (BA); Fordham University (MA); Harvard University (JD)	January 3, 2013	San Diego	13 years, 320 days
Colorado 1	Diana DeGette	Democratic	July 29, 1957 (age 69)	Colorado House of Representatives	Colorado College (BA); New York University (JD)	January 3, 1997	Denver	29 years, 320 days
Colorado 2	Joe Neguse	Democratic	May 13, 1984 (age 42)	Executive Director of the Colorado Department of Regulatory Agencies; Regents of the University of Colorado	University of Colorado, Boulder (BA, JD)	January 3, 2019	Lafayette	7 years, 320 days
Colorado 3	Jeff Hurd	Republican	August 15, 1979 (age 47)	Attorney; Law clerk	University of Notre Dame (BA); University of Denver (JD); Columbia University (LL.M)	January 3, 2025	Grand Junction	1 year, 320 days
Colorado 4	Lauren Boebert	Republican	December 19, 1986 (age 39)	Businesswoman; Restaurateur	–	January 3, 2021	Windsor	5 years, 320 days
Colorado 5	Jeff Crank	Republican	January 28, 1967 (age 59)	Radio host Nonprofit executive Businessman; Political consultant Congressional staffer	Colorado State University (BA)	January 3, 2025	Colorado Springs	1 year, 320 days
Colorado 6	Jason Crow	Democratic	March 15, 1979 (age 47)	Attorney; U.S. Army	University of Wisconsin, Madison (BA); University of Denver (JD)	January 3, 2019	Aurora	7 years, 320 days
Colorado 7	Brittany Pettersen	Democratic	December 6, 1981 (age 44)	Colorado Senate; Colorado House of Representatives	Metropolitan State University of Denver (BA)	January 3, 2023	Lakewood	3 years, 320 days
Colorado 8	Gabe Evans	Republican	July 28, 1986 (age 40)	Colorado House; Arvada Police Department; U.S. Army National Guard	Patrick Henry College (BA)	January 3, 2025	Fort Lupton	1 year, 320 days
Connecticut 1	John B. Larson	Democratic	July 22, 1948 (age 78)	Connecticut Senate; East Hartford City Council; East Hartford Board of Education	Central Connecticut State University (BA)	January 3, 1999	East Hartford	27 years, 320 days
Connecticut 2	Joe Courtney	Democratic	April 6, 1953 (age 73)	Connecticut House of Representatives	Tufts University (BA); University of Connecticut (JD)	January 3, 2007	Vernon	19 years, 320 days
Connecticut 3	Rosa DeLauro	Democratic	March 2, 1943 (age 83)	Executive Director of EMILY's List; Political aide	Marymount College, Tarrytown (BA); London School of Economics (MA); Columbia University (MA)	January 3, 1991	New Haven	35 years, 320 days
Connecticut 4	Jim Himes	Democratic	July 5, 1966 (age 60)	Financial executive Greenwich Housing Authority Board	Harvard University (BA); St Edmund Hall, Oxford (MPhil)	January 3, 2009	Cos Cob	17 years, 320 days
Connecticut 5	Jahana Hayes	Democratic	March 8, 1973 (age 53)	Teacher	Naugatuck Valley Community College; Southern Connecticut State University (BA); University of Saint Joseph (MA); University of Bridgeport (SYC)	January 3, 2019	Wolcott	7 years, 320 days
Delaware at-large	Sarah McBride	Democratic	August 9, 1990 (age 36)	Delaware Senate	American University (BA)	January 3, 2025	Wilmington	1 year, 320 days
Florida 1	Jimmy Patronis	Republican	April 13, 1972 (age 54)	Chief Financial Officer of Florida; Member of the Florida Public Service Commission; Florida House of Representatives	Gulf Coast State College (AS); Florida State University (BS)	April 2, 2025 (special)	Fort Walton Beach	1 year, 231 days
Florida 2	Neal Dunn	Republican	February 16, 1953 (age 73)	Surgeon	Washington and Lee University (BS); George Washington University (MD)	January 3, 2017	Panama City	9 years, 320 days
Florida 3	Kat Cammack	Republican	February 16, 1988 (age 38)	Political advisor	Metropolitan State University of Denver (BA); Naval War College (MS)	January 3, 2021	Gainesville	5 years, 320 days
Florida 4	Aaron Bean	Republican	January 25, 1967 (age 59)	President Pro Tempore of the Florida Senate; Florida House of Representatives	Jacksonville University (BS)	January 3, 2023	Fernandina Beach	3 years, 320 days
Florida 5	John Rutherford	Republican	September 2, 1952 (age 74)	Sheriff of Duval County	Florida State College; Florida State University (BS)	January 3, 2017	Jacksonville	9 years, 320 days
Florida 6	Randy Fine	Republican	April 20, 1974 (age 52)	Florida Senate; Florida House of Representatives	Harvard University (BA, MBA)	April 2, 2025 (special)	Melbourne Beach	1 year, 231 days
Florida 7	Cory Mills	Republican	July 13, 1980 (age 46)	Defense Business Board; Businessman; Security specialist U.S. Army	Florida State College at Jacksonville (AA); American Military University (BS, MA)	January 3, 2023	New Smyrna Beach	3 years, 320 days
Florida 8	Mike Haridopolos	Republican	March 15, 1970 (age 56)	President of the Florida Senate; Florida House	Stetson University (BA); University of Arkansas (MA)	January 3, 2025	Indian Harbour Beach	1 year, 320 days
Florida 9	Darren Soto	Democratic	February 25, 1978 (age 48)	Florida Senate; Florida House of Representatives	Rutgers University–New Brunswick (BA); George Washington University (JD)	January 3, 2017	Kissimmee	9 years, 320 days
Florida 10	Maxwell Frost	Democratic	January 17, 1997 (age 29)	Activist; Political organizer	Valencia College	January 3, 2023	Orlando	3 years, 320 days
Florida 11	Daniel Webster	Republican	April 27, 1949 (age 77)	Florida Senate; Speaker of Florida House of Representatives	Georgia Institute of Technology (BS)	January 3, 2011	Clermont	15 years, 320 days
Florida 12	Gus Bilirakis	Republican	February 8, 1963 (age 63)	Florida House of Representatives	St. Petersburg College; University of Florida (BA); Stetson University (JD)	January 3, 2007	Palm Harbor	19 years, 320 days
Florida 13	Anna Paulina Luna	Republican	May 6, 1989 (age 37)	Air National Guard; U.S. Air Force; Political Commentator	University of West Florida (BS)	January 3, 2023	St. Petersburg	3 years, 320 days
Florida 14	Kathy Castor	Democratic	August 20, 1966 (age 60)	Assistant General Counsel to the Florida Department of Community Affairs; President of the Florida Association of Women Lawyers; Hillsborough County Board of Commissioners	Emory University (BA); Florida State University (JD)	January 3, 2007	Tampa	19 years, 320 days
Florida 15	Laurel Lee	Republican	March 26, 1974 (age 52)	Secretary of State of Florida; Judge of the Thirteenth Judicial Circuit Court of Florida	University of Florida (BA, JD)	January 3, 2023	Brandon	3 years, 320 days
Florida 16	Vern Buchanan	Republican	May 8, 1951 (age 75)	Auto dealer	Cleary University (BA); University of Detroit Mercy (MBA)	January 3, 2007	Longboat Key	19 years, 320 days
Florida 17	Greg Steube	Republican	May 19, 1978 (age 48)	Florida Senate; Florida House of Representatives; U.S. Army	University of Florida (BS, JD)	January 3, 2019	Sarasota	7 years, 320 days
Florida 18	Scott Franklin	Republican	August 23, 1964 (age 62)	Lakeland City Commission; U.S. Navy	United States Naval Academy (BA) Embry–Riddle Aeronautical University (MBA)	January 3, 2021	Lakeland	5 years, 320 days
Florida 19	Byron Donalds	Republican	October 28, 1978 (age 48)	Florida House of Representatives	Florida State University (BS)	January 3, 2021	Naples	5 years, 320 days
Florida 20	Vacant							
Florida 21	Brian Mast	Republican	July 10, 1980 (age 46)	U.S. Army	Palm Beach Atlantic University; American Military University; Harvard University (BLA)	January 3, 2017	Fort Pierce	9 years, 320 days
Florida 22	Lois Frankel	Democratic	May 16, 1948 (age 78)	Mayor of West Palm Beach; Florida House of Representatives	Boston University (BA); Georgetown University (JD)	January 3, 2013	West Palm Beach	13 years, 320 days
Florida 23	Jared Moskowitz	Democratic	December 18, 1980 (age 45)	Florida House of Representatives; Broward County Commission; Director of the Florida Division of Emergency Management	George Washington University (BA); Nova Southeastern University (JD)	January 3, 2023	Parkland	3 years, 320 days
Florida 24	Frederica Wilson	Democratic	November 5, 1942 (age 84)	Florida Senate; Florida House of Representatives; Miami-Dade County Public Schools Board	Fisk University (BA); University of Miami (MA)	January 3, 2011	Miami Gardens	15 years, 320 days
Florida 25	Debbie Wasserman Schultz	Democratic	September 27, 1966 (age 60)	Florida Senate; Florida House of Representatives; Democratic National Committee Chair	University of Florida (BA, MA)	January 3, 2005	Weston	21 years, 320 days
Florida 26	Mario Díaz-Balart	Republican	September 25, 1961 (age 65)	Florida Senate; Florida House of Representatives	University of South Florida (BA)	January 3, 2003	Kendall West	23 years, 320 days
Florida 27	María Elvira Salazar	Republican	November 1, 1961 (age 65)	News anchor Journalist	Miami Dade College; University of Miami (BA); Harvard University (MPA)	January 3, 2021	Coral Gables	5 years, 320 days
Florida 28	Carlos Giménez	Republican	January 17, 1954 (age 72)	Mayor of Miami-Dade County; Miami-Dade County Commission	Barry University (BPA)	January 3, 2021	Richmond Heights	5 years, 320 days
Georgia 1	Buddy Carter	Republican	September 6, 1957 (age 69)	Georgia Senate; Georgia House of Representatives; Mayor of Pooler	Young Harris College; University of Georgia (BS)	January 3, 2015	Pooler	11 years, 320 days
Georgia 2	Sanford Bishop	Democratic	February 4, 1947 (age 79)	Georgia Senate; Georgia House of Representatives	Morehouse College (BA); Emory University (JD)	January 3, 1993	Albany	33 years, 320 days
Georgia 3	Brian Jack	Republican	February 17, 1988 (age 38)	Assistant to the President and Director of Political Affairs; President-Elect's Transition Team member Campaign aide Political analyst	Pepperdine University (BA)	January 3, 2025	Peachtree City	1 year, 320 days
Georgia 4	Hank Johnson	Democratic	October 2, 1954 (age 72)	DeKalb County Commissioner; Associate Magistrate Judge	Clark Atlanta University (BA); Texas Southern University (JD)	January 3, 2007	Lithonia	19 years, 320 days
Georgia 5	Nikema Williams	Democratic	July 30, 1978 (age 48)	Georgia Senate; Chair of the Georgia Democratic Party	Talladega College (BA)	January 3, 2021	Atlanta	5 years, 320 days
Georgia 6	Lucy McBath	Democratic	June 1, 1960 (age 66)	Activist	Virginia State University (BA)	January 3, 2019	Marietta	7 years, 320 days
Georgia 7	Rich McCormick	Republican	October 7, 1968 (age 58)	U.S. Marine Corps Emergency physician	Oregon State University (BS); Morehouse School of Medicine (MD); National University (MBA)	January 3, 2023	Suwanee	3 years, 320 days
Georgia 8	Austin Scott	Republican	December 10, 1969 (age 56)	Georgia House of Representatives	University of Georgia (BA)	January 3, 2011	Tifton	15 years, 320 days
Georgia 9	Andrew Clyde	Republican	November 22, 1963 (age 62)	U.S. Navy; Businessman; Gun Store Owner	University of Notre Dame (BA); Bethel University (BBA); University of Georgia (MBA)	January 3, 2021	Athens	5 years, 320 days
Georgia 10	Mike Collins	Republican	July 2, 1967 (age 59)	Businessman; Trucker	Georgia State University (BA)	January 3, 2023	Jackson	3 years, 320 days
Georgia 11	Barry Loudermilk	Republican	December 22, 1963 (age 62)	Georgia State Senate; Georgia House of Representatives	Air University (AS); Wayland Baptist University (BS)	January 3, 2015	Cassville	11 years, 320 days
Georgia 12	Rick Allen	Republican	November 7, 1951 (age 75)	Businessman	Auburn University (BS)	January 3, 2015	Augusta	11 years, 320 days
Georgia 13	Everton Blair	Democratic	April 23, 1992 (age 34)	Gwinnett County School Board	Harvard University (BA, EdD); Stanford University (MA)	September 1, 2026 (special)	Lilburn	79 days
Georgia 14	Clay Fuller	Republican	April 9, 1981 (age 45)	District Attorney for Lookout Mountain Judicial Circuit; White House Fellow; Air National Guard; U.S. Air Force	Florida Atlantic University; Emory University (BA); Cornell University (MPA); Southern Methodist University (JD); Air University (MMAS)	April 14, 2026 (special)	Lookout Mountain	219 days
Hawaii 1	Ed Case	Democratic	September 27, 1952 (age 74)	U.S. House; Hawaii House of Representatives	Williams College (BA); University of California, Hastings (JD)	January 3, 2019	Honolulu	7 years, 320 days
Hawaii 2	Jill Tokuda	Democratic	March 3, 1976 (age 50)	Hawaii Senate	George Washington University (BA)	January 3, 2023	Kāneʻohe	3 years, 320 days
Idaho 1	Russ Fulcher	Republican	March 9, 1962 (age 64)	Idaho Senate	Boise State University (BA, MBA)	January 3, 2019	Meridian	7 years, 320 days
Idaho 2	Mike Simpson	Republican	September 8, 1950 (age 76)	Speaker of the Idaho House of Representatives; Blackfoot City Council	Utah State University (BS); Washington University in St. Louis (DMD)	January 3, 1999	Idaho Falls	27 years, 320 days
Illinois 1	Jonathan Jackson	Democratic	January 7, 1966 (age 60)	Investment Analyst	North Carolina A&T State University (BA); Northwestern University (MBA)	January 3, 2023	Chicago	3 years, 320 days
Illinois 2	Robin Kelly	Democratic	April 30, 1956 (age 70)	Illinois House of Representatives; Chief of Staff to the Illinois Treasurer; Chief Administrative Officer to the Cook County President	Bradley University (BA, MA); Northern Illinois University (PhD)	April 11, 2013 (special)	Lynwood	13 years, 222 days
Illinois 3	Delia Ramirez	Democratic	June 2, 1983 (age 43)	Illinois House of Representatives	Northeastern Illinois University (BA)	January 3, 2023	Chicago	3 years, 320 days
Illinois 4	Chuy García	Democratic	April 12, 1956 (age 70)	Cook County Board of Commissioners; Illinois Senate; Chicago City Council	University of Illinois Chicago (BA, MUP)	January 3, 2019	Chicago	7 years, 320 days
Illinois 5	Mike Quigley	Democratic	October 17, 1958 (age 68)	Cook County Board of Commissioners	Roosevelt University (BA); University of Chicago (MPP); Loyola University Chicago (JD)	April 7, 2009 (special)	Chicago	17 years, 226 days
Illinois 6	Sean Casten	Democratic	November 23, 1971 (age 54)	Entrepreneur	Middlebury College (BA); Dartmouth College (MSEM, MS)	January 3, 2019	Downers Grove	7 years, 320 days
Illinois 7	Danny Davis	Democratic	September 6, 1941 (age 85)	Chicago City Council; Cook County Board of Commissioners	University of Arkansas at Pine Bluff (BA); Chicago State University (MS); Union Institute & University (PhD)	January 3, 1997	Chicago	29 years, 320 days
Illinois 8	Raja Krishnamoorthi	Democratic	July 19, 1973 (age 53)	Public servant Attorney	Princeton University (BS); Harvard University (JD)	January 3, 2017	Schaumburg	9 years, 320 days
Illinois 9	Jan Schakowsky	Democratic	May 26, 1944 (age 82)	Illinois House of Representatives	University of Illinois Urbana-Champaign (BS)	January 3, 1999	Evanston	27 years, 320 days
Illinois 10	Brad Schneider	Democratic	August 20, 1961 (age 65)	U.S. House	Northwestern University (BS, MBA)	January 3, 2017	Deerfield	9 years, 320 days
Illinois 11	Bill Foster	Democratic	October 7, 1955 (age 71)	U.S. House	University of Wisconsin–Madison (BS); Harvard University (MS, PhD)	January 3, 2013	Naperville	13 years, 320 days
Illinois 12	Mike Bost	Republican	December 30, 1960 (age 65)	Illinois House of Representatives	–	January 3, 2015	Murphysboro	11 years, 320 days
Illinois 13	Nikki Budzinski	Democratic	March 11, 1977 (age 49)	Chief of Staff to the Director of the Office of Management and Budget; Senior Adviser for the Exploratory Committee to J. B. Pritzker	University of Illinois, Urbana-Champaign (BA)	January 3, 2023	Springfield	3 years, 320 days
Illinois 14	Lauren Underwood	Democratic	October 4, 1986 (age 40)	Registered nurse	University of Michigan (BSN); Johns Hopkins University (MSN, MPH)	January 3, 2019	Naperville	7 years, 320 days
Illinois 15	Mary Miller	Republican	August 27, 1959 (age 67)	Farmer	Eastern Illinois University (BA, BS)	January 3, 2021	Oakland	5 years, 320 days
Illinois 16	Darin LaHood	Republican	July 5, 1968 (age 58)	Illinois Senate; Prosecutor U.S. Attorney's Office; Deputy Prosecutor Tazewell County	Loras College (BA); John Marshall Law School, Chicago (JD)	September 17, 2015 (special)	Dunlap	11 years, 63 days
Illinois 17	Eric Sorensen	Democratic	March 18, 1976 (age 50)	Meteorologist	Northern Illinois University (BS)	January 3, 2023	Moline	3 years, 320 days
Indiana 1	Frank J. Mrvan	Democratic	April 16, 1969 (age 57)	North Township Trustee	Ball State University (BS)	January 3, 2021	Highland	5 years, 320 days
Indiana 2	Rudy Yakym	Republican	February 24, 1984 (age 42)	Indiana Judicial Nominating Commission; Businessman	Indiana University South Bend (AS, BS); University of Notre Dame (MBA)	November 14, 2022 (special)	Granger	4 years, 5 days
Indiana 3	Marlin Stutzman	Republican	August 31, 1976 (age 50)	U.S. House; Indiana Senate; Indiana House	Glen Oaks Community College; Trine University	January 3, 2025	Howe	1 year, 320 days
Indiana 4	Jim Baird	Republican	June 4, 1945 (age 81)	Indiana House of Representatives; Putnam County Commission; U.S. Army	Purdue University, West Lafayette (BS, MS); University of Kentucky (PhD)	January 3, 2019	Greencastle	7 years, 320 days
Indiana 5	Victoria Spartz	Republican	October 6, 1978 (age 48)	Indiana Senate	Kyiv National Economic University (BS, MBA); Indiana University, Indianapolis (MAcc)	January 3, 2021	Noblesville	5 years, 320 days
Indiana 6	Jefferson Shreve	Republican	September 24, 1965 (age 61)	Indianapolis City-County Council	Indiana University Bloomington (BA); University of London (MA); Purdue University (MBA)	January 3, 2025	Indianapolis	1 year, 320 days
Indiana 7	André Carson	Democratic	October 16, 1974 (age 52)	Indianapolis City-County Council	Concordia University Wisconsin (BA); Indiana Wesleyan University (MS)	March 11, 2008 (special)	Indianapolis	18 years, 253 days
Indiana 8	Mark Messmer	Republican	December 16, 1967 (age 58)	Majority Leader of the Indiana Senate; Indiana House	Purdue University (BS)	January 3, 2025	Jasper	1 year, 320 days
Indiana 9	Erin Houchin	Republican	September 24, 1976 (age 50)	Indiana State Senate	Indiana University, Bloomington (BS); George Washington University (MA)	January 3, 2023	Salem	3 years, 320 days
Iowa 1	Mariannette Miller-Meeks	Republican	September 6, 1955 (age 71)	Iowa Senate; Director of the Iowa Department of Public Health; U.S. Army	Texas Christian University (BS); University of Southern California (MS); University of Texas, San Antonio (MD)	January 3, 2021	Ottumwa	5 years, 320 days
Iowa 2	Ashley Hinson	Republican	June 27, 1983 (age 43)	Iowa House of Representatives; News anchor	University of Southern California (BA)	January 3, 2021	Marion	5 years, 320 days
Iowa 3	Zach Nunn	Republican	May 4, 1979 (age 47)	Iowa Senate; Iowa House of Representatives; U.S. Air Force	Drake University (BA); Air University (MMAS); University of Cambridge (MSt)	January 3, 2023	Bondurant	3 years, 320 days
Iowa 4	Randy Feenstra	Republican	January 14, 1969 (age 57)	Iowa Senate; Sioux County Treasurer	Dordt University (BA); Iowa State University (MPA)	January 3, 2021	Hull	5 years, 320 days
Kansas 1	Tracey Mann	Republican	December 17, 1976 (age 49)	Lieutenant Governor of Kansas; Real estate agent Businessman	Kansas State University (BS)	January 3, 2021	Salina	5 years, 320 days
Kansas 2	Derek Schmidt	Republican	January 23, 1968 (age 58)	Attorney General of Kansas; Majority Leader of the Kansas Senate; Special Counsel to the Governor of Kansas; Assistant Attorney General of Kansas	University of Kansas (BA); University of Leicester (MA); Georgetown University (JD)	January 3, 2025	Independence	1 year, 320 days
Kansas 3	Sharice Davids	Democratic	May 22, 1980 (age 46)	Attorney; Mixed martial artist	Haskell Indian Nations University; University of Kansas; Johnson County Community College; University of Missouri–Kansas City (BA); Cornell University (JD)	January 3, 2019	Roeland Park	7 years, 320 days
Kansas 4	Ron Estes	Republican	July 19, 1956 (age 70)	Kansas State Treasurer; Treasurer of Sedgwick County	Tennessee Technological University (BS, MBA)	April 25, 2017 (special)	Wichita	9 years, 208 days
Kentucky 1	James Comer	Republican	August 19, 1972 (age 54)	Kentucky House of Representatives; Agriculture Commissioner of Kentucky	Western Kentucky University (BS)	November 8, 2016 (special)	Tompkinsville	10 years, 11 days
Kentucky 2	Brett Guthrie	Republican	February 18, 1964 (age 62)	Kentucky Senate	United States Military Academy (BS); Yale University (MBA)	January 3, 2009	Bowling Green	17 years, 320 days
Kentucky 3	Morgan McGarvey	Democratic	December 23, 1979 (age 46)	Minority Leader of the Kentucky Senate; Special Assistant to the Attorney General of Kentucky	University of Missouri (BA); University of Kentucky (JD)	January 3, 2023	Louisville	3 years, 320 days
Kentucky 4	Thomas Massie	Republican	January 13, 1971 (age 55)	Judge-Executive of Lewis County	Massachusetts Institute of Technology (BS, MS)	November 13, 2012 (special)	Garrison	14 years, 6 days
Kentucky 5	Hal Rogers	Republican	December 31, 1937 (age 88)	Commonwealth's Attorney for Pulaski County and Rockcastle County	Western Kentucky University (BA); University of Kentucky (LLB)	January 3, 1981	Somerset	45 years, 320 days
Kentucky 6	Andy Barr	Republican	July 24, 1973 (age 53)	Attorney	University of Virginia (BA); University of Kentucky (JD)	January 3, 2013	Lexington	13 years, 320 days
Louisiana 1	Steve Scalise	Republican	October 6, 1965 (age 61)	Louisiana State Senate; Louisiana House of Representatives	Louisiana State University (BS)	May 3, 2008 (special)	Jefferson	18 years, 200 days
Louisiana 2	Troy Carter	Democratic	October 26, 1963 (age 63)	Louisiana State Senate; Louisiana House of Representatives; New Orleans City Council	Xavier University of Louisiana (BA)	May 11, 2021 (special)	New Orleans	5 years, 192 days
Louisiana 3	Clay Higgins	Republican	August 24, 1961 (age 65)	Reserve Deputy Marshal of Lafayette	Louisiana State University	January 3, 2017	Lafayette	9 years, 320 days
Louisiana 4	Mike Johnson	Republican	January 30, 1972 (age 54)	Louisiana House of Representatives	Louisiana State University (BA, JD)	January 3, 2017	Benton	9 years, 320 days
Louisiana 5	Julia Letlow	Republican	March 16, 1981 (age 45)	College administrator	University of Louisiana at Monroe (BA, MA); University of South Florida (PhD)	April 14, 2021 (special)	Start	5 years, 219 days
Louisiana 6	Cleo Fields	Democratic	November 22, 1962 (age 63)	U.S. House; Louisiana Senate	Southern University (BA, JD)	January 3, 2025	Baton Rouge	1 year, 320 days
Maine 1	Chellie Pingree	Democratic	April 2, 1955 (age 71)	Maine State Senate; President, Common Cause	University of Southern Maine; College of the Atlantic (BS)	January 3, 2009	North Haven	17 years, 320 days
Maine 2	Jared Golden	Democratic	July 25, 1982 (age 44)	Maine House of Representatives	University of Maine, Farmington; Bates College (BA)	January 3, 2019	Lewiston	7 years, 320 days
Maryland 1	Andy Harris	Republican	January 25, 1957 (age 69)	Maryland Senate; Anesthesiologist	Johns Hopkins University (BS, MD, MHS)	January 3, 2011	Cambridge	15 years, 320 days
Maryland 2	Johnny Olszewski	Democratic	September 10, 1982 (age 44)	Baltimore County Executive; Maryland House of Delegates; Baltimore County Board of Education	Goucher College (BA); George Washington University (MA); University of Maryland, Baltimore County (PhD)	January 3, 2025	Sparrows Point	1 year, 320 days
Maryland 3	Sarah Elfreth	Democratic	September 9, 1988 (age 38)	Maryland Senate	Towson University (BA); Johns Hopkins University (MPP)	January 3, 2025	Annapolis	1 year, 320 days
Maryland 4	Glenn Ivey	Democratic	February 27, 1961 (age 65)	State's Attorney of Prince George's County; Chair of the Maryland Public Service Commission; Majority Council to the U.S. Senate Banking Committee; Assistant U.S. Attorney	Princeton University (BA); Harvard University (JD)	January 3, 2023	Cheverly	3 years, 320 days
Maryland 5	Steny Hoyer	Democratic	June 14, 1939 (age 87)	President of the Maryland Senate; Maryland Board of Higher Education	University of Maryland, College Park (BA); Georgetown University (JD)	May 19, 1981 (special)	Mechanicsville	45 years, 184 days
Maryland 6	April McClain Delaney	Democratic	May 28, 1964 (age 62)	Deputy Assistant Secretary of Commerce for Communications and Information; Nonprofit executive Businesswoman; Attorney	Northwestern University (BS); Georgetown University (JD)	January 3, 2025	Potomac	1 year, 320 days
Maryland 7	Kweisi Mfume	Democratic	October 24, 1948 (age 78)	Baltimore City Council U.S. House President of the NAACP	Baltimore City Community College; Morgan State University (BA); Johns Hopkins University (MA)	May 5, 2020 (special)	Baltimore	6 years, 198 days
Maryland 8	Jamie Raskin	Democratic	December 13, 1962 (age 63)	Maryland Senate Majority Whip	Harvard University (BA, JD)	January 3, 2017	Takoma Park	9 years, 320 days
Massachusetts 1	Richard Neal	Democratic	February 14, 1949 (age 77)	Mayor of Springfield	Holyoke Community College; American International College (BA); University of Hartford (MA)	January 3, 1989	Springfield	37 years, 320 days
Massachusetts 2	Jim McGovern	Democratic	November 20, 1959 (age 66)	Congressional staff member	American University (BA, MPA)	January 3, 1997	Worcester	29 years, 320 days
Massachusetts 3	Lori Trahan	Democratic	October 27, 1973 (age 53)	Businesswoman Chief of Staff to Rep. Marty Meehan	Georgetown University (BA)	January 3, 2019	Westford	7 years, 320 days
Massachusetts 4	Jake Auchincloss	Democratic	January 29, 1988 (age 38)	Newton City Council	Harvard University (BA); Massachusetts Institute of Technology (MBA)	January 3, 2021	Newton	5 years, 320 days
Massachusetts 5	Katherine Clark	Democratic	July 17, 1963 (age 63)	Massachusetts Senate; Massachusetts House of Representatives; Attorney	St. Lawrence University (BA); Cornell University (JD); Harvard University (MPA)	December 12, 2013 (special)	Revere	12 years, 342 days
Massachusetts 6	Seth Moulton	Democratic	October 24, 1978 (age 48)	Businessman; Activist; U.S. Marine Corps	Harvard University (BS, MBA, MPP)	January 3, 2015	Salem	11 years, 320 days
Massachusetts 7	Ayanna Pressley	Democratic	February 3, 1974 (age 52)	Boston City Council	Boston University	January 3, 2019	Boston	7 years, 320 days
Massachusetts 8	Stephen Lynch	Democratic	March 31, 1955 (age 71)	Massachusetts Senate; Massachusetts House of Representatives	Wentworth Institute of Technology (BS); Boston College (JD); Harvard University (MPA)	October 16, 2001 (special)	Boston	25 years, 34 days
Massachusetts 9	Bill Keating	Democratic	September 6, 1952 (age 74)	Massachusetts House of Representatives; Massachusetts Senate; Norfolk County District Attorney	Boston College (BA, MBA); Suffolk University (JD)	January 3, 2011	Bourne	15 years, 320 days
Michigan 1	Jack Bergman	Republican	February 2, 1947 (age 79)	U.S. Marine Corps	Gustavus Adolphus College (BA); University of West Florida (MBA)	January 3, 2017	Watersmeet	9 years, 320 days
Michigan 2	John Moolenaar	Republican	May 8, 1961 (age 65)	Michigan Senate; Michigan House of Representatives	Hope College (BS); Harvard University (MPA)	January 3, 2015	Caledonia	11 years, 320 days
Michigan 3	Hillary Scholten	Democratic	February 22, 1982 (age 44)	Board of Immigration Appeals Judicial Law Clerk/Attorney Adviser; U.S. Court of Appeals Immigration Staff Attorney	Gordon College (BA); University of Maryland, Baltimore (JD)	January 3, 2023	Grand Rapids	3 years, 320 days
Michigan 4	Bill Huizenga	Republican	January 31, 1969 (age 57)	Michigan House of Representatives	Calvin College (BA)	January 3, 2011	Holland	15 years, 320 days
Michigan 5	Tim Walberg	Republican	April 12, 1951 (age 75)	U.S. House; Michigan House of Representatives	Western Illinois University; Moody Bible Institute; Taylor University (BA); Wheaton College, Illinois (MA)	January 3, 2011	Tipton	15 years, 320 days
Michigan 6	Debbie Dingell	Democratic	November 23, 1953 (age 72)	President of the General Motors Foundation Wayne State University Board of Governors; Lobbyist	Georgetown University (BS, MS)	January 3, 2015	Ann Arbor	11 years, 320 days
Michigan 7	Tom Barrett	Republican	April 30, 1981 (age 45)	Michigan Senate; Michigan House; U.S. Army	Western Michigan University (BA)	January 3, 2025	Charlotte	1 year, 320 days
Michigan 8	Kristen McDonald Rivet	Democratic	July 11, 1970 (age 56)	Michigan Senate	Michigan State University (BA); University of Michigan–Flint (MA)	January 3, 2025	Bay City	1 year, 320 days
Michigan 9	Lisa McClain	Republican	April 7, 1966 (age 60)	Businesswoman	Lansing Community College; Northwood University (BA)	January 3, 2021	Romeo	5 years, 320 days
Michigan 10	John James	Republican	June 8, 1981 (age 45)	U.S. Army; Businessman	United States Military Academy (BS); University of Michigan (MBA); Pennsylvania State University (MS)	January 3, 2023	Shelby Charter Township	3 years, 320 days
Michigan 11	Haley Stevens	Democratic (Note: Stevens was expelled from the Michigan Democratic Party on November 1, 2026, though she remains a member of the federal Democratic Party and the House Democratic Caucus.)	June 24, 1983 (age 43)	Presidential Task Force on the Auto Industry	American University (BA, MA)	January 3, 2019	Birmingham	7 years, 320 days
Michigan 12	Rashida Tlaib	Democratic	July 24, 1976 (age 50)	Michigan House of Representatives	Wayne State University (BA); Thomas M. Cooley Law School (JD)	January 3, 2019	Detroit	7 years, 320 days
Michigan 13	Shri Thanedar	Democratic	February 22, 1955 (age 71)	Michigan House of Representatives	University of Mumbai (BS, MS); University of Akron (PhD)	January 3, 2023	Detroit	3 years, 320 days
Minnesota 1	Brad Finstad	Republican	May 30, 1976 (age 50)	Director of USDA Rural Development for Minnesota; Minnesota House of Representatives	University of Minnesota (BS)	August 12, 2022 (special)	New Ulm	4 years, 99 days
Minnesota 2	Angie Craig	Democratic	February 14, 1972 (age 54)	Medical technology executive Reporter	University of Memphis (BA)	January 3, 2019	Prior Lake	7 years, 320 days
Minnesota 3	Kelly Morrison	Democratic	February 2, 1969 (age 57)	Minnesota Senate; Minnesota House	Yale University (BA); Boston University; Case Western Reserve University (MD)	January 3, 2025	Deephaven	1 year, 320 days
Minnesota 4	Betty McCollum	Democratic	July 12, 1954 (age 72)	North St. Paul City Council; Minnesota House of Representatives	St. Catherine University (BA)	January 3, 2001	Saint Paul	25 years, 320 days
Minnesota 5	Ilhan Omar	Democratic	October 4, 1982 (age 44)	Minnesota House of Representatives	North Dakota State University (BA)	January 3, 2019	Minneapolis	7 years, 320 days
Minnesota 6	Tom Emmer	Republican	March 3, 1961 (age 65)	Minnesota House of Representatives	Boston College; University of Alaska Fairbanks (BA); William Mitchell College of Law (JD)	January 3, 2015	Delano	11 years, 320 days
Minnesota 7	Michelle Fischbach	Republican	November 3, 1965 (age 61)	Lieutenant Governor of Minnesota; President of the Minnesota Senate; Minnesota Senate	St. Cloud State University (BA); William Mitchell College of Law (JD)	January 3, 2021	Regal	5 years, 320 days
Minnesota 8	Pete Stauber	Republican	May 10, 1966 (age 60)	St. Louis County Commission; Police lieutenant Professional hockey player	Lake Superior State University (BA)	January 3, 2019	Hermantown	7 years, 320 days
Mississippi 1	Trent Kelly	Republican	March 1, 1966 (age 60)	District attorney, Tupelo City prosecutor Army National Guard Colonel	East Central Community College; University of Mississippi (BA, JD); United States Army War College (MA)	June 2, 2015 (special)	Saltillo	11 years, 170 days
Mississippi 2	Bennie Thompson	Democratic	January 28, 1948 (age 78)	Alderman and Mayor of Bolton; Hinds County Board of Supervisors	Tougaloo College (BA); Jackson State University (MS)	April 13, 1993 (special)	Bolton	33 years, 220 days
Mississippi 3	Michael Guest	Republican	February 4, 1970 (age 56)	District Attorney for Madison and Rankin Counties	Mississippi State University (BS); University of Mississippi (JD)	January 3, 2019	Brandon	7 years, 320 days
Mississippi 4	Mike Ezell	Republican	April 6, 1959 (age 67)	Sheriff of Jackson County	University of Southern Mississippi (BA)	January 3, 2023	Pascagoula	3 years, 320 days
Missouri 1	Wesley Bell	Democratic	November 5, 1974 (age 52)	St. Louis County Prosecuting Attorney; Ferguson City Council	Lindenwood University (BA); University of Missouri (JD)	January 3, 2025	Ferguson	1 year, 320 days
Missouri 2	Ann Wagner	Republican	September 13, 1962 (age 64)	U.S. Ambassador to Luxembourg; Co-Chair of the Republican National Committee; Chairwoman of the Missouri Republican Party	University of Missouri (BS)	January 3, 2013	Ballwin	13 years, 320 days
Missouri 3	Bob Onder	Republican	January 6, 1962 (age 64)	Missouri Senate; Missouri House	Washington University in St. Louis (BS, MD); Saint Louis University (JD)	January 3, 2025	Lake St. Louis	1 year, 320 days
Missouri 4	Mark Alford	Republican	October 4, 1963 (age 63)	Journalist	University of Texas at Austin (BA)	January 3, 2023	Lake Winnebago	3 years, 320 days
Missouri 5	Emanuel Cleaver	Democratic	October 26, 1944 (age 82)	Mayor of Kansas City; Pastor; Radio show host	Prairie View A&M University (BS); Saint Paul School of Theology (MDiv)	January 3, 2005	Kansas City	21 years, 320 days
Missouri 6	Sam Graves	Republican	November 7, 1963 (age 63)	Missouri Senate; Missouri House of Representatives	University of Missouri (BS)	January 3, 2001	Tarkio	25 years, 320 days
Missouri 7	Eric Burlison	Republican	October 2, 1976 (age 50)	Missouri Senate; Missouri House of Representatives	Missouri State University (BA, MBA)	January 3, 2023	Ozark	3 years, 320 days
Missouri 8	Jason Smith	Republican	June 16, 1980 (age 46)	Missouri House of Representatives	University of Missouri (BS); Oklahoma City University (JD)	June 4, 2013 (special)	Salem	13 years, 168 days
Montana 1	Ryan Zinke	Republican	November 1, 1961 (age 65)	United States Secretary of the Interior; U.S. House; Montana Senate; U.S. Navy	University of Oregon (BS); National University (MBA); University of San Diego (MS)	January 3, 2023	Whitefish	3 years, 320 days
Montana 2	Troy Downing	Republican	March 4, 1967 (age 59)	Montana State Auditor	New York University	January 3, 2025	Big Sky	1 year, 320 days
Nebraska 1	Mike Flood	Republican	February 23, 1975 (age 51)	Speaker of the Nebraska Legislature	University of Notre Dame (BA); University of Nebraska–Lincoln (JD)	July 12, 2022 (special)	Norfolk	4 years, 130 days
Nebraska 2	Don Bacon	Republican	August 16, 1963 (age 63)	U.S. Air Force	Northern Illinois University (BA); University of Phoenix (MBA); National Defense University (MA)	January 3, 2017	Papillion	9 years, 320 days
Nebraska 3	Adrian Smith	Republican	December 19, 1970 (age 55)	Nebraska Legislature; Gering City Council	Liberty University; University of Nebraska–Lincoln (BA)	January 3, 2007	Gering	19 years, 320 days
Nevada 1	Dina Titus	Democratic	May 23, 1950 (age 76)	U.S. House; Nevada Senate	College of William & Mary (BA); University of Georgia (MA); Florida State University (PhD)	January 3, 2013	Las Vegas	13 years, 320 days
Nevada 2	Mark Amodei	Republican	June 12, 1958 (age 68)	Nevada Senate; Chair of the Nevada Republican Party; Nevada Assembly	University of Nevada, Reno (BA); University of the Pacific (JD)	September 13, 2011 (special)	Carson City	15 years, 67 days
Nevada 3	Susie Lee	Democratic	November 7, 1966 (age 60)	Education advocate	Carnegie Mellon University (BA, MS)	January 3, 2019	Las Vegas	7 years, 320 days
Nevada 4	Steven Horsford	Democratic	April 29, 1973 (age 53)	U.S. House; Nevada Senate	University of Nevada, Reno (BA)	January 3, 2019	Las Vegas	7 years, 320 days
New Hampshire 1	Chris Pappas	Democratic	June 4, 1980 (age 46)	New Hampshire Executive Council; Treasurer of Hillsborough County; New Hampshire House of Representatives	Harvard University (BA)	January 3, 2019	Manchester	7 years, 320 days
New Hampshire 2	Maggie Goodlander	Democratic	November 4, 1986 (age 40)	U.S. Deputy Assistant Attorney General for the Antitrust Division; U.S. Navy	Yale University (BA, JD)	January 3, 2025	Nashua	1 year, 320 days
New Jersey 1	Donald Norcross	Democratic	December 13, 1958 (age 67)	New Jersey Senate; New Jersey General Assembly	Camden County College; Rutgers University-Camden	November 12, 2014 (special)	Camden	12 years, 7 days
New Jersey 2	Jeff Van Drew	Republican	February 23, 1953 (age 73)	New Jersey Senate; New Jersey General Assembly Cape May County Board of Chosen Freeholders	Rutgers University–New Brunswick (BS); Fairleigh Dickinson University (DMD)	January 3, 2019	Dennis Township	7 years, 320 days
New Jersey 3	Herb Conaway	Democratic	January 30, 1963 (age 63)	New Jersey General Assembly; U.S. Air Force	Princeton University (BA); Thomas Jefferson University (MD); Rutgers University–Newark (JD)	January 3, 2025	Delran	1 year, 320 days
New Jersey 4	Chris Smith	Republican	March 4, 1953 (age 73)	Retail executive	The College of New Jersey (BS)	January 3, 1981	Manchester Township	45 years, 320 days
New Jersey 5	Josh Gottheimer	Democratic	March 8, 1975 (age 51)	Attorney; Political aide	University of Pennsylvania (BA); Pembroke College, Oxford; Harvard University (JD)	January 3, 2017	Tenafly	9 years, 320 days
New Jersey 6	Frank Pallone	Democratic	October 30, 1951 (age 75)	New Jersey Senate; Long Branch City Council	Middlebury College (BA); Tufts University (MA); Rutgers University–Camden (JD)	November 8, 1988 (special)	Long Branch	38 years, 11 days
New Jersey 7	Thomas Kean Jr.	Republican	September 5, 1968 (age 58)	Minority Leader of the New Jersey Senate; New Jersey General Assembly; U.S. Environmental Protection Agency special assistant Congressional aide	Dartmouth College (BA); Tufts University (MA)	January 3, 2023	Westfield	3 years, 320 days
New Jersey 8	Rob Menendez	Democratic	July 12, 1985 (age 41)	Commissioner of the Port Authority of New York and New Jersey	University of North Carolina at Chapel Hill (BA); Rutgers University–Newark (JD)	January 3, 2023	Jersey City	3 years, 320 days
New Jersey 9	Nellie Pou	Democratic	May 20, 1956 (age 70)	New Jersey Senate; New Jersey General Assembly	Kean College; Rutgers University; University of Virginia (BA)	January 3, 2025	North Haledon	1 year, 320 days
New Jersey 10	LaMonica McIver	Democratic	June 20, 1986 (age 40)	President of the Newark Municipal Council	Bloomfield College (BA); Seton Hall University (MA); Kean University (EdD)	September 23, 2024 (special)	Newark	2 years, 57 days
New Jersey 11	Analilia Mejia	Democratic	August 19, 1977 (age 49)	Non-profit executive Deputy Director of the U.S. Department of Labor Women's Bureau; Political organizer New Jersey Department of Health legislative liaison	Rutgers University–New Brunswick (BA, MPP, MA)	April 20, 2026 (special)	Glen Ridge	213 days
New Jersey 12	Bonnie Watson Coleman	Democratic	February 6, 1945 (age 81)	New Jersey General Assembly	Rutgers University-Camden; Thomas Edison State University (BA)	January 3, 2015	Ewing Township	11 years, 320 days
New Mexico 1	Melanie Stansbury	Democratic	January 31, 1979 (age 47)	New Mexico House of Representatives	Saint Mary's College of California (BA); Cornell University (MS)	June 14, 2021 (special)	Albuquerque	5 years, 158 days
New Mexico 2	Gabe Vasquez	Democratic	August 3, 1984 (age 42)	Las Cruces City Council	New Mexico State University (BA)	January 3, 2023	Las Cruces	3 years, 320 days
New Mexico 3	Teresa Leger Fernandez	Democratic	July 1, 1959 (age 67)	Attorney	Yale University (BA); Stanford University (JD)	January 3, 2021	Santa Fe	5 years, 320 days
New York 1	Nick LaLota	Republican	June 23, 1978 (age 48)	Suffolk County Board of Elections; Chief of Staff to the Suffolk County Presiding Officer; Amityville Board of Trustees; New York Senate staffer U.S. House staffer U.S. Navy	United States Naval Academy (BS); Hofstra University (JD, MBA)	January 3, 2023	Amityville	3 years, 320 days
New York 2	Andrew Garbarino	Republican	September 27, 1984 (age 42)	New York State Assembly	George Washington University (BA); Hofstra University (JD)	January 3, 2021	Bayport	5 years, 320 days
New York 3	Tom Suozzi	Democratic	August 31, 1962 (age 64)	U.S. House; Nassau County Executive; Mayor of Glen Cove	Boston College (BA); Fordham University (JD)	February 28, 2024 (special)	Glen Cove	2 years, 264 days
New York 4	Laura Gillen	Democratic	July 10, 1969 (age 57)	Hempstead Town Supervisor	Georgetown University (BA); New York University (JD)	January 3, 2025	Rockville Centre	1 year, 320 days
New York 5	Gregory Meeks	Democratic	September 25, 1953 (age 73)	New York State Assembly	Adelphi University (BA); Howard University (JD)	February 5, 1998 (special)	Queens	28 years, 287 days
New York 6	Grace Meng	Democratic	October 1, 1975 (age 51)	New York State Assembly	University of Michigan (BA); Yeshiva University (JD)	January 3, 2013	Queens	13 years, 320 days
New York 7	Nydia Velázquez	Democratic	March 28, 1953 (age 73)	Director, Dept. of Puerto Rican Community Affairs	University of Puerto Rico, Río Piedras (BA); New York University (MA)	January 3, 1993	Brooklyn	33 years, 320 days
New York 8	Hakeem Jeffries	Democratic	August 4, 1970 (age 56)	New York State Assembly	Binghamton University (BA); Georgetown University (MPP); New York University (JD)	January 3, 2013	Brooklyn	13 years, 320 days
New York 9	Yvette Clarke	Democratic	November 21, 1964 (age 61)	New York City Council	Oberlin College; Medgar Evers College	January 3, 2007	Brooklyn	19 years, 320 days
New York 10	Dan Goldman	Democratic	February 26, 1976 (age 50)	Senior Adviser and Director of Investigations for the House Permanent Select Intelligence Committee; Assistant U.S. Attorney; Judicial Clerk for the U.S. Court of Appeals for the Second Circuit; Judicial Clerk for the U.S. District Court of the Northern District of California	Yale University (BA); Stanford University (JD)	January 3, 2023	New York	3 years, 320 days
New York 11	Nicole Malliotakis	Republican	November 11, 1980 (age 46)	New York State Assembly	Seton Hall University (BA); Wagner College (MBA)	January 3, 2021	Staten Island	5 years, 320 days
New York 12	Jerry Nadler	Democratic	June 13, 1947 (age 79)	New York State Assembly	Columbia University (BA); Fordham University (JD)	November 3, 1992 (special)	New York	34 years, 16 days
New York 13	Adriano Espaillat	Democratic	September 27, 1954 (age 72)	New York State Senate; New York State Assembly	Queens College, City University of New York (BA)	January 3, 2017	New York	9 years, 320 days
New York 14	Alexandria Ocasio-Cortez	Democratic	October 13, 1989 (age 37)	Bartender Activist	Boston University (BA)	January 3, 2019	Queens	7 years, 320 days
New York 15	Ritchie Torres	Democratic	March 12, 1988 (age 38)	New York City Council	New York University	January 3, 2021	The Bronx	5 years, 320 days
New York 16	George Latimer	Democratic	November 22, 1953 (age 72)	Westchester County Executive; New York Senate; New York State Assembly Westchester County Board of Legislators	Fordham University (BA); New York University (MPA)	January 3, 2025	Rye	1 year, 320 days
New York 17	Mike Lawler	Republican	September 9, 1986 (age 40)	New York State Assembly	Manhattan College (BS)	January 3, 2023	Pearl River	3 years, 320 days
New York 18	Pat Ryan	Democratic	March 28, 1982 (age 44)	Ulster County Executive	United States Military Academy (BS); Georgetown University (MA)	September 13, 2022 (special)	Gardiner	4 years, 67 days
New York 19	Josh Riley	Democratic	January 21, 1981 (age 45)	Attorney; U.S. Senate staffer Law clerk Policy analyst U.S. House staffer	College of William & Mary (BS); Harvard University (JD)	January 3, 2025	Ithaca	1 year, 320 days
New York 20	Paul Tonko	Democratic	June 18, 1949 (age 77)	New York State Assembly	Clarkson University (BS)	January 3, 2009	Amsterdam	17 years, 320 days
New York 21	Elise Stefanik	Republican	July 2, 1984 (age 42)	Civil servant Political activist	Harvard University (BA)	January 3, 2015	Schuylerville	11 years, 320 days
New York 22	John Mannion	Democratic	July 8, 1968 (age 58)	New York Senate	State University of New York at Binghamton (BS); State University of New York at Oswego (MS)	January 3, 2025	Geddes	1 year, 320 days
New York 23	Nick Langworthy	Republican	February 27, 1981 (age 45)	Chair of the New York Republican State Committee; Chair of the Erie County Republican Committee	Niagara University (BA)	January 3, 2023	Pendleton	3 years, 320 days
New York 24	Claudia Tenney	Republican	February 4, 1961 (age 65)	U.S. House; New York State Assembly	Colgate University (BA); University of Cincinnati (JD)	January 3, 2021	Cleveland	5 years, 320 days
New York 25	Joseph Morelle	Democratic	April 29, 1957 (age 69)	New York State Assembly	State University of New York at Geneseo (BA)	November 13, 2018 (special)	Irondequoit	8 years, 6 days
New York 26	Tim Kennedy	Democratic	October 20, 1976 (age 50)	New York State Senate; Erie County Legislature	D'Youville University (BA, MS)	May 6, 2024 (special)	Buffalo	2 years, 197 days
North Carolina 1	Don Davis	Democratic	August 29, 1971 (age 55)	North Carolina Senate; Mayor of Snow Hill; U.S. Air Force	United States Air Force Academy (BS); Central Michigan University (MS); East Carolina University (MA, EdD)	January 3, 2023	Snow Hill	3 years, 320 days
North Carolina 2	Deborah Ross	Democratic	June 20, 1963 (age 63)	North Carolina House of Representatives	Brown University (AB); University of North Carolina at Chapel Hill (JD)	January 3, 2021	Raleigh	5 years, 320 days
North Carolina 3	Greg Murphy	Republican	March 5, 1963 (age 63)	North Carolina House of Representatives	Davidson College (BA); University of North Carolina at Chapel Hill (MD)	September 17, 2019 (special)	Greenville	7 years, 63 days
North Carolina 4	Valerie Foushee	Democratic	May 7, 1956 (age 70)	North Carolina Senate; North Carolina House of Representatives; Orange County Board of Commissioners	University of North Carolina at Chapel Hill (BA)	January 3, 2023	Chapel Hill	3 years, 320 days
North Carolina 5	Virginia Foxx	Republican	June 29, 1943 (age 83)	North Carolina Senate	University of North Carolina at Chapel Hill (BA); University of North Carolina at Greensboro (MA, EdD)	January 3, 2005	Blowing Rock	21 years, 320 days
North Carolina 6	Addison McDowell	Republican	January 21, 1994 (age 32)	Lobbyist; U.S. House staffer	University of North Carolina at Charlotte (BS)	January 3, 2025	Bermuda Run	1 year, 320 days
North Carolina 7	David Rouzer	Republican	February 16, 1972 (age 54)	North Carolina Senate	North Carolina State University (BS)	January 3, 2015	Wilmington	11 years, 320 days
North Carolina 8	Mark Harris	Republican	April 24, 1966 (age 60)	Pastor	Appalachian State University (BA); Southern Baptist Theological Seminary (MDiv, DMin)	January 3, 2025	Indian Trail	1 year, 320 days
North Carolina 9	Richard Hudson	Republican	November 4, 1971 (age 55)	Businessman	University of North Carolina at Charlotte (BA)	January 3, 2013	Southern Pines	13 years, 320 days
North Carolina 10	Pat Harrigan	Republican	June 21, 1987 (age 39)	Businessman; U.S. Army	United States Military Academy (BS)	January 3, 2025	Hickory	1 year, 320 days
North Carolina 11	Chuck Edwards	Republican	September 13, 1960 (age 66)	North Carolina Senate	Blue Ridge Community College	January 3, 2023	Flat Rock	3 years, 320 days
North Carolina 12	Alma Adams	Democratic	May 27, 1946 (age 80)	North Carolina House of Representatives	North Carolina A&T State University (BS, MS); Ohio State University (PhD)	November 12, 2014 (special)	Charlotte	12 years, 7 days
North Carolina 13	Brad Knott	Republican	April 17, 1986 (age 40)	Attorney; Law clerk	Baylor University (BA); Wake Forest University (JD)	January 3, 2025	Raleigh	1 year, 320 days
North Carolina 14	Tim Moore	Republican	October 2, 1970 (age 56)	Speaker of the North Carolina House of Representatives; University of North Carolina Board of Governors	Campbell University; University of North Carolina at Chapel Hill (BA); Wake Forest University (JD)	January 3, 2025	Kings Mountain	1 year, 320 days
North Dakota at-large	Julie Fedorchak	Republican	September 28, 1968 (age 58)	North Dakota Public Service Commission	University of North Dakota (BA)	January 3, 2025	Mandan	1 year, 320 days
Ohio 1	Greg Landsman	Democratic	December 4, 1976 (age 49)	Cincinnati City Council; Director of the Ohio Governor's Office of Faith-Based and Community Initiatives	Ohio University (BA); Harvard University (MA)	January 3, 2023	Cincinnati	3 years, 320 days
Ohio 2	David Taylor	Republican	November 16, 1969 (age 57)	Businessman; Attorney	Miami University (BA); University of Dayton (JD)	January 3, 2025	Amelia	1 year, 320 days
Ohio 3	Joyce Beatty	Democratic	March 12, 1950 (age 76)	Ohio House of Representatives	Central State University (BA); Wright State University (MS); University of Cincinnati	January 3, 2013	Columbus	13 years, 320 days
Ohio 4	Jim Jordan	Republican	February 17, 1964 (age 62)	Ohio Senate; Ohio House of Representatives	University of Wisconsin–Madison (BS); Ohio State University (MA); Capital University (JD)	January 3, 2007	Urbana	19 years, 320 days
Ohio 5	Bob Latta	Republican	April 18, 1956 (age 70)	Wood County Commissioner; Ohio House of Representatives; Ohio Senate	Bowling Green State University (BA); University of Toledo (JD)	December 13, 2007 (special)	Bowling Green	18 years, 341 days
Ohio 6	Michael Rulli	Republican	March 11, 1969 (age 57)	Ohio Senate; Businessman	Emerson College (BA)	June 25, 2024 (special)	Salem	2 years, 147 days
Ohio 7	Max Miller	Republican	November 13, 1988 (age 38)	Special assistant to the President; Associate Director of the Presidential Personnel Office; White House Office lead advance representative U.S. Department of the Treasury confidential assistant	Cleveland State University (BA)	January 3, 2023	Rocky River	3 years, 320 days
Ohio 8	Warren Davidson	Republican	March 1, 1970 (age 56)	Businessman; U.S. Army	United States Military Academy (BS); University of Notre Dame (MBA)	June 9, 2016 (special)	Troy	10 years, 163 days
Ohio 9	Marcy Kaptur	Democratic	June 17, 1946 (age 80)	Domestic Policy Advisor, Carter Adm.	University of Wisconsin–Madison (BA); University of Michigan (MUP); Massachusetts Institute of Technology	January 3, 1983	Toledo	43 years, 320 days
Ohio 10	Mike Turner	Republican	January 11, 1960 (age 66)	Mayor of Dayton	Ohio Northern University (BA); Case Western Reserve University (JD); University of Dayton (MBA)	January 3, 2003	Dayton	23 years, 320 days
Ohio 11	Shontel Brown	Democratic	June 24, 1975 (age 51)	Cuyahoga County Council	Cuyahoga Community College (AS); Wilberforce University (BS)	November 4, 2021 (special)	Warrensville Heights	5 years, 15 days
Ohio 12	Troy Balderson	Republican	January 16, 1962 (age 64)	Ohio Senate; Ohio House of Representatives	Muskingum University; Ohio State University	September 5, 2018 (special)	Zanesville	8 years, 75 days
Ohio 13	Emilia Sykes	Democratic	January 4, 1986 (age 40)	Minority Leader of the Ohio House of Representatives	Kent State University (BA); University of Florida (JD, MPH)	January 3, 2023	Akron	3 years, 320 days
Ohio 14	David Joyce	Republican	March 17, 1957 (age 69)	Geauga County Prosecutor	University of Dayton (BS, JD)	January 3, 2013	South Russell	13 years, 320 days
Ohio 15	Mike Carey	Republican	March 13, 1971 (age 55)	Lobbyist	Marion Military Institute (AA); Ohio State University (BA)	November 4, 2021 (special)	Columbus	5 years, 15 days
Oklahoma 1	Kevin Hern	Republican	December 4, 1961 (age 64)	Businessman	Arkansas Tech University (BS); Georgia Institute of Technology; University of Arkansas, Little Rock (MBA)	November 13, 2018 (appointed) (Note: Oklahoma governor Mary Fallin nominated Hern to the seat of resigned representative Jim Bridenstine after Hern won the new term of Bridenstine's vacant seat in the November election. Under Oklahoma law, if a House seat falls vacant in an even-numbered year and the incumbent's term is due to end the following year, the governor can appoint someone to serve the remainder of the term. Accordingly, Hern was sworn into the House on November 13.)	Tulsa	8 years, 6 days
Oklahoma 2	Josh Brecheen	Republican	June 19, 1979 (age 47)	Oklahoma Senate; U.S. Senate staffer	Oklahoma State University, Stillwater; Southeastern Oklahoma State University (BS)	January 3, 2023	Coalgate	3 years, 320 days
Oklahoma 3	Frank Lucas	Republican	January 6, 1960 (age 66)	Oklahoma House of Representatives	Oklahoma State University–Stillwater (BS)	May 10, 1994 (special)	Cheyenne	32 years, 193 days
Oklahoma 4	Tom Cole	Republican	April 28, 1949 (age 77)	Oklahoma Senate; Oklahoma Secretary of State; College professor	Grinnell College (BA); Yale University (MA); University of Oklahoma (PhD)	January 3, 2003	Moore	23 years, 320 days
Oklahoma 5	Stephanie Bice	Republican	November 11, 1973 (age 53)	Oklahoma Senate	Oklahoma State University, Stillwater (BS)	January 3, 2021	Oklahoma City	5 years, 320 days
Oregon 1	Suzanne Bonamici	Democratic	October 14, 1954 (age 72)	Oregon House of Representatives; Oregon State Senate	Lane Community College; University of Oregon (BA, JD)	January 31, 2012 (special)	Beaverton	14 years, 292 days
Oregon 2	Cliff Bentz	Republican	January 12, 1952 (age 74)	Oregon State Senate; Oregon House of Representatives	Eastern Oregon University (BA); Lewis and Clark College (JD)	January 3, 2021	Ontario	5 years, 320 days
Oregon 3	Maxine Dexter	Democratic	December 5, 1972 (age 53)	Oregon House	University of Washington (BA, MD)	January 3, 2025	Portland	1 year, 320 days
Oregon 4	Val Hoyle	Democratic	February 14, 1964 (age 62)	Oregon Commissioner of Labor and Industries; Majority Leader of the Oregon House of Representatives	Emmanuel College (BA)	January 3, 2023	Springfield	3 years, 320 days
Oregon 5	Janelle Bynum	Democratic	January 31, 1975 (age 51)	Oregon House	Florida A&M University (BA); University of Michigan (MBA)	January 3, 2025	Happy Valley	1 year, 320 days
Oregon 6	Andrea Salinas	Democratic	December 6, 1969 (age 56)	Oregon House of Representatives; U.S. House legislative aide U.S. Senate legislative aide	University of California, Berkeley (BA)	January 3, 2023	Tigard	3 years, 320 days
Pennsylvania 1	Brian Fitzpatrick	Republican	December 17, 1973 (age 52)	FBI agent Special Assistant U.S. Attorney	La Salle University (BS); Pennsylvania State University (MBA); Pennsylvania State University, Carlisle (JD)	January 3, 2017	Levittown	9 years, 320 days
Pennsylvania 2	Brendan Boyle	Democratic	February 6, 1977 (age 49)	Pennsylvania House of Representatives	University of Notre Dame (BA); Harvard University (MPP)	January 3, 2015	Philadelphia	11 years, 320 days
Pennsylvania 3	Dwight Evans	Democratic	May 16, 1954 (age 72)	Pennsylvania House of Representatives	Community College of Philadelphia (AA); La Salle University (BA)	November 14, 2016 (special)	Philadelphia	10 years, 5 days
Pennsylvania 4	Madeleine Dean	Democratic	June 6, 1959 (age 67)	Pennsylvania House of Representatives	La Salle University (BA); Widener University (JD)	January 3, 2019	Jenkintown	7 years, 320 days
Pennsylvania 5	Mary Gay Scanlon	Democratic	August 30, 1959 (age 67)	Attorney	Colgate University (BA); University of Pennsylvania (JD)	November 13, 2018 (special)	Swarthmore	8 years, 6 days
Pennsylvania 6	Chrissy Houlahan	Democratic	June 5, 1967 (age 59)	Entrepreneur; U.S. Air Force	Stanford University (BS); Massachusetts Institute of Technology (MS)	January 3, 2019	Devon	7 years, 320 days
Pennsylvania 7	Ryan Mackenzie	Republican	August 3, 1982 (age 44)	Pennsylvania House	New York University (BS); Harvard University (MBA)	January 3, 2025	Lower Macungie Township	1 year, 320 days
Pennsylvania 8	Rob Bresnahan	Republican	April 22, 1990 (age 36)	Businessman	University of Scranton (BS)	January 3, 2025	Pittston	1 year, 320 days
Pennsylvania 9	Dan Meuser	Republican	February 10, 1964 (age 62)	Secretary of Revenue of Pennsylvania	State University of New York Maritime College; Cornell University (BA)	January 3, 2019	Dallas	7 years, 320 days
Pennsylvania 10	Scott Perry	Republican	May 27, 1962 (age 64)	Pennsylvania House of Representatives; Businessman; U.S. Army	Pennsylvania State University (BS); United States Army War College (MS)	January 3, 2013	Dillsburg	13 years, 320 days
Pennsylvania 11	Lloyd Smucker	Republican	January 23, 1964 (age 62)	Pennsylvania Senate	Lebanon Valley College; Franklin and Marshall College	January 3, 2017	West Lampeter Township	9 years, 320 days
Pennsylvania 12	Summer Lee	Democratic	November 26, 1987 (age 38)	Pennsylvania House of Representatives	Pennsylvania State University (BA); Howard University (JD)	January 3, 2023	Swissvale	3 years, 320 days
Pennsylvania 13	John Joyce	Republican	February 8, 1957 (age 69)	Dermatologist	Pennsylvania State University, Altoona; Pennsylvania State University, University Park (BS); Temple University (MD)	January 3, 2019	Hollidaysburg	7 years, 320 days
Pennsylvania 14	Guy Reschenthaler	Republican	April 17, 1983 (age 43)	Pennsylvania Senate; Judge; U.S. Navy	Pennsylvania State University, Behrend (BA); Duquesne University (JD)	January 3, 2019	Peters Township	7 years, 320 days
Pennsylvania 15	Glenn Thompson	Republican	July 27, 1959 (age 67)	Chair of the Centre County Republican Committee	Pennsylvania State University (BS); Temple University (MEd)	January 3, 2009	Howard	17 years, 320 days
Pennsylvania 16	Mike Kelly	Republican	May 10, 1948 (age 78)	Butler City Council	University of Notre Dame (BA)	January 3, 2011	Butler	15 years, 320 days
Pennsylvania 17	Chris Deluzio	Democratic	July 13, 1984 (age 42)	University policy director Lawyer; U.S. Navy officer	United States Naval Academy (BS); Georgetown University (JD)	January 3, 2023	Aspinwall	3 years, 320 days
Rhode Island 1	Gabe Amo	Democratic	December 11, 1987 (age 38)	Special Assistant and Deputy Director of the White House Office of Intergovernmental Affairs; Director of Public Engagement and Community Affairs for the Office of the Governor of Rhode Island	Wheaton College (BA); Merton College, Oxford (MSc)	November 13, 2023 (special)	Pawtucket	3 years, 6 days
Rhode Island 2	Seth Magaziner	Democratic	July 22, 1983 (age 43)	General Treasurer of Rhode Island	Brown University (BA); Yale University (MBA)	January 3, 2023	Providence	3 years, 320 days
South Carolina 1	Nancy Mace	Republican	December 4, 1977 (age 48)	South Carolina House of Representatives	The Citadel (BS); University of Georgia (MS)	January 3, 2021	Charleston	5 years, 320 days
South Carolina 2	Joe Wilson	Republican	July 31, 1947 (age 79)	South Carolina Senate; U.S. Army	Washington and Lee University (BA); University of South Carolina (JD)	December 18, 2001 (special)	Springdale	24 years, 336 days
South Carolina 3	Sheri Biggs	Republican	March 28, 1970 (age 56)	Air National Guard	Carolina Bible College (BA); Samford University (DNP); Air War College	January 3, 2025	Salem	1 year, 320 days
South Carolina 4	William Timmons	Republican	April 30, 1984 (age 42)	South Carolina Senate; Attorney; Entrepreneur	George Washington University (BA); University of South Carolina (MA, JD)	January 3, 2019	Greenville	7 years, 320 days
South Carolina 5	Ralph Norman	Republican	June 20, 1953 (age 73)	South Carolina House of Representatives	Presbyterian College (BS)	June 20, 2017 (special)	Rock Hill	9 years, 152 days
South Carolina 6	Jim Clyburn	Democratic	July 21, 1940 (age 86)	Political aide Teacher	South Carolina State University (BA)	January 3, 1993	Columbia	33 years, 320 days
South Carolina 7	Russell Fry	Republican	January 31, 1985 (age 41)	South Carolina House of Representatives	University of South Carolina (BA); Charleston School of Law (JD)	January 3, 2023	Murrells Inlet	3 years, 320 days
South Dakota at-large	Dusty Johnson	Republican	September 30, 1976 (age 50)	Chief of Staff to the Governor of South Dakota; South Dakota Public Utilities Commission	University of South Dakota (BA); University of Kansas (MPA)	January 3, 2019	Mitchell	7 years, 320 days
Tennessee 1	Diana Harshbarger	Republican	January 1, 1960 (age 66)	Pharmacist	East Tennessee State University (BS); Mercer University (PharmD)	January 3, 2021	Kingsport	5 years, 320 days
Tennessee 2	Tim Burchett	Republican	August 25, 1964 (age 62)	Mayor of Knox County; Tennessee Senate; Tennessee House of Representatives	University of Tennessee, Knoxville (BS)	January 3, 2019	Knoxville	7 years, 320 days
Tennessee 3	Chuck Fleischmann	Republican	October 11, 1962 (age 64)	Attorney	University of Illinois Urbana-Champaign (BA); University of Tennessee (JD)	January 3, 2011	Ooltewah	15 years, 320 days
Tennessee 4	Scott DesJarlais	Republican	February 21, 1964 (age 62)	Physician	University of South Dakota (BS, MD)	January 3, 2011	Jasper	15 years, 320 days
Tennessee 5	Andy Ogles	Republican	June 18, 1971 (age 55)	Mayor of Maury County	Middle Tennessee State University (BS)	January 3, 2023	Culleoka	3 years, 320 days
Tennessee 6	John Rose	Republican	February 23, 1965 (age 61)	Commissioner of Agriculture of Tennessee	Tennessee Technological University (BS); Purdue University, West Lafayette (MS); Vanderbilt University (JD)	January 3, 2019	Cookeville	7 years, 320 days
Tennessee 7	Matt Van Epps	Republican	March 29, 1983 (age 43)	Tennessee Commissioner of General Services; Tennessee Army National Guard	United States Military Academy (BS); University of North Carolina at Chapel Hill (MPA)	December 4, 2025 (special)	Nashville	350 days
Tennessee 8	David Kustoff	Republican	October 8, 1966 (age 60)	U.S. Attorney for the United States District Court for the Western District of Tennessee	University of Memphis (BA, JD)	January 3, 2017	Germantown	9 years, 320 days
Tennessee 9	Steve Cohen	Democratic	May 24, 1949 (age 77)	Tennessee Senate; Attorney	Vanderbilt University (BA); University of Memphis (JD)	January 3, 2007	Memphis	19 years, 320 days
Texas 1	Nathaniel Moran	Republican	September 23, 1974 (age 52)	Smith County Judge; Tyler City Council	Texas Tech University (BA, MBA, JD)	January 3, 2023	Whitehouse	3 years, 320 days
Texas 2	Dan Crenshaw	Republican	March 14, 1984 (age 42)	U.S. Navy	Tufts University (BA); Harvard University (MPA)	January 3, 2019	Atascocita	7 years, 320 days
Texas 3	Keith Self	Republican	March 20, 1953 (age 73)	Collin County Judge; U.S. Army	United States Military Academy (BS); University of Southern California (MA)	January 3, 2023	McKinney	3 years, 320 days
Texas 4	Pat Fallon	Republican	December 19, 1967 (age 58)	Texas Senate; Texas House of Representatives; United States Air Force second lieutenant	University of Notre Dame (BA)	January 3, 2021	Frisco	5 years, 320 days
Texas 5	Lance Gooden	Republican	December 1, 1982 (age 43)	Texas House of Representatives	University of Texas, Austin (BA, BBA)	January 3, 2019	Terrell	7 years, 320 days
Texas 6	Jake Ellzey	Republican	January 24, 1970 (age 56)	Texas House of Representatives; United States Navy commander	United States Naval Academy (BS)	July 30, 2021 (special)	Midlothian	5 years, 112 days
Texas 7	Lizzie Fletcher	Democratic	February 13, 1975 (age 51)	Attorney	Kenyon College (BA); College of William and Mary (JD)	January 3, 2019	Houston	7 years, 320 days
Texas 8	Morgan Luttrell	Republican	November 7, 1975 (age 51)	Special advisor to the U.S. Secretary of Energy; U.S. Navy	Sam Houston State University (BS); University of Texas at Dallas (MA)	January 3, 2023	Magnolia	3 years, 320 days
Texas 9	Al Green	Democratic	September 1, 1947 (age 79)	Harris County Justice of the Peace; Houston NAACP president	Florida A&M University; Tuskegee University (BA); Texas Southern University (JD)	January 3, 2005	Houston	21 years, 320 days
Texas 10	Michael McCaul	Republican	January 14, 1962 (age 64)	Attorney; Federal prosecutor	Trinity University (BA); St. Mary's University, Texas (JD)	January 3, 2005	West Lake Hills	21 years, 320 days
Texas 11	August Pfluger	Republican	December 28, 1978 (age 47)	U.S. National Security Council; United States Air Force	United States Air Force Academy (BS); Embry–Riddle Aeronautical University (MS); Air University (MS); Georgetown University (MS)	January 3, 2021	San Angelo	5 years, 320 days
Texas 12	Craig Goldman	Republican	October 3, 1968 (age 58)	Majority Leader of the Texas House of Representatives	University of Texas at Austin (BA)	January 3, 2025	Fort Worth	1 year, 320 days
Texas 13	Ronny Jackson	Republican	May 4, 1967 (age 59)	Chief Medical Advisor to the President; Physician to the President; United States Navy	Texas A&M University (BS); University of Texas Medical Branch (MD)	January 3, 2021	Amarillo	5 years, 320 days
Texas 14	Randy Weber	Republican	July 2, 1953 (age 73)	Texas House of Representatives; Pearland City Council	Alvin Community College; University of Houston–Clear Lake (BS)	January 3, 2013	Friendswood	13 years, 320 days
Texas 15	Monica De La Cruz	Republican	November 11, 1974 (age 52)	Insurance agent Businesswoman	University of Texas at San Antonio (BBS); National Autonomous University of Mexico	January 3, 2023	Edinburg	3 years, 320 days
Texas 16	Veronica Escobar	Democratic	September 15, 1969 (age 57)	El Paso County Commission; El Paso County Judge	University of Texas, El Paso (BA); New York University (MA)	January 3, 2019	El Paso	7 years, 320 days
Texas 17	Pete Sessions	Republican	March 22, 1955 (age 71)	U.S. House	Southwestern University (BS)	January 3, 2021	Waco	5 years, 320 days
Texas 18	Christian Menefee	Democratic	April 18, 1988 (age 38)	County Attorney of Harris County	University of Texas, San Antonio (BA); Washington University in St. Louis (JD)	February 2, 2026 (special)	Houston	290 days
Texas 19	Jodey Arrington	Republican	March 9, 1972 (age 54)	Educator; Public administrator White House aide	Texas Tech University (BA, MPA)	January 3, 2017	Lubbock	9 years, 320 days
Texas 20	Joaquin Castro	Democratic	September 16, 1974 (age 52)	Texas House of Representatives	Stanford University (BA); Harvard University (JD)	January 3, 2013	San Antonio	13 years, 320 days
Texas 21	Chip Roy	Republican	August 7, 1972 (age 54)	First Assistant Attorney General of Texas	University of Virginia (BS, MS); University of Texas, Austin (JD)	January 3, 2019	Dripping Springs	7 years, 320 days
Texas 22	Troy Nehls	Republican	April 7, 1968 (age 58)	Sheriff of Fort Bend County	Liberty University (BA); University of Houston–Downtown (MA)	January 3, 2021	Richmond	5 years, 320 days
Texas 23	Vacant							
Texas 24	Beth Van Duyne	Republican	November 16, 1970 (age 56)	Mayor of Irving	Cornell University (BA)	January 3, 2021	Irving	5 years, 320 days
Texas 25	Roger Williams	Republican	September 13, 1949 (age 77)	Secretary of State of Texas	Texas Christian University (BA)	January 3, 2013	Weatherford	13 years, 320 days
Texas 26	Brandon Gill	Republican	February 26, 1994 (age 32)	Businessman	Dartmouth College (BS)	January 3, 2025	Flower Mound	1 year, 320 days
Texas 27	Michael Cloud	Republican	May 13, 1975 (age 51)	Chair of the Victoria County Republican Party	Oral Roberts University (BS)	July 10, 2018 (special)	Victoria	8 years, 132 days
Texas 28	Henry Cuellar	Democratic	September 19, 1955 (age 71)	Texas House of Representatives; Texas Secretary of State	Laredo Community College; Georgetown University (BA); University of Texas at Austin (JD, PhD); Texas A&M International University (MA); Naval War College	January 3, 2005	Laredo	21 years, 320 days
Texas 29	Sylvia Garcia	Democratic	September 6, 1950 (age 76)	Texas Senate	Texas Woman's University (BA); Texas Southern University (JD)	January 3, 2019	Houston	7 years, 320 days
Texas 30	Jasmine Crockett	Democratic	March 29, 1981 (age 45)	Texas House of Representatives	Rhodes College (BA); University of Houston (JD)	January 3, 2023	Dallas	3 years, 320 days
Texas 31	John Carter	Republican	November 6, 1941 (age 85)	Texas state district judge	Texas Tech University (BA); University of Texas at Austin (JD)	January 3, 2003	Round Rock	23 years, 320 days
Texas 32	Julie Johnson	Democratic	May 2, 1966 (age 60)	Texas House	University of Texas at Austin (BA); University of Houston (JD)	January 3, 2025	Farmers Branch	1 year, 320 days
Texas 33	Marc Veasey	Democratic	January 3, 1971 (age 55)	Texas House of Representatives	Texas Wesleyan University (BA)	January 3, 2013	Fort Worth	13 years, 320 days
Texas 34	Vicente Gonzalez	Democratic	September 4, 1967 (age 59)	Food processing executive Texas State Board of Education	Embry–Riddle Aeronautical University (BA); Texas Wesleyan University (JD)	January 3, 2017	McAllen	9 years, 320 days
Texas 35	Greg Casar	Democratic	May 4, 1989 (age 37)	Austin City Council	University of Virginia (BA)	January 3, 2023	Austin	3 years, 320 days
Texas 36	Brian Babin	Republican	March 23, 1948 (age 78)	Lower Neches Valley Authority; Texas Historical Commission; Mayor of Woodville	Lamar University (BS); University of Texas, Houston (DDS)	January 3, 2015	Woodville	11 years, 320 days
Texas 37	Lloyd Doggett	Democratic	October 6, 1946 (age 80)	Texas Senate; Texas Supreme Court justice College professor	University of Texas at Austin (BA, JD)	January 3, 1995	Austin	31 years, 320 days
Texas 38	Wesley Hunt	Republican	November 13, 1981 (age 45)	U.S. Army	United States Military Academy (BS); Cornell University (MBA, MPA, MA)	January 3, 2023	Houston	3 years, 320 days
Utah 1	Blake Moore	Republican	June 22, 1980 (age 46)	United States Foreign Service officer	University of Utah (BA); Northwestern University (MS)	January 3, 2021	Salt Lake City	5 years, 320 days
Utah 2	Celeste Maloy	Republican	May 22, 1981 (age 45)	Congressional counsel Washington County Water Conservancy District Staff Attorney; Utah Association of Counties Public Lands Attorney; Deputy Washington County Attorney; Soil conservationist	Southern Utah University (BS); Brigham Young University (JD)	November 28, 2023 (special)	Cedar City	2 years, 356 days
Utah 3	Mike Kennedy	Republican	February 2, 1969 (age 57)	Utah Senate; Utah House	Brigham Young University (BS, JD); Michigan State University (MD)	January 3, 2025	Alpine	1 year, 320 days
Utah 4	Burgess Owens	Republican	August 2, 1951 (age 75)	Businessman; National Football League player	University of Miami (BS)	January 3, 2021	Herriman	5 years, 320 days
Vermont at-large	Becca Balint	Democratic	May 4, 1968 (age 58)	President pro tempore of the Vermont Senate; Majority leader of the Vermont Senate	Smith College (BA); Harvard University (MEd); University of Massachusetts Amherst (MA)	January 3, 2023	Brattleboro	3 years, 320 days
Virginia 1	Rob Wittman	Republican	February 3, 1959 (age 67)	Mayor of Montross; Westmoreland County Board of Supervisors; Virginia House of Delegates	Virginia Tech (BS); University of North Carolina at Chapel Hill (MPH); Virginia Commonwealth University (PhD)	December 11, 2007 (special)	Montross	18 years, 343 days
Virginia 2	Jen Kiggans	Republican	June 18, 1971 (age 55)	Virginia Senate; U.S. Navy	Old Dominion University (BSN); Vanderbilt University (MSN)	January 3, 2023	Virginia Beach	3 years, 320 days
Virginia 3	Bobby Scott	Democratic	April 30, 1947 (age 79)	Virginia Senate; Virginia House of Delegates	Harvard University (BA); Boston College (JD)	January 3, 1993	Newport News	33 years, 320 days
Virginia 4	Jennifer McClellan	Democratic	December 28, 1972 (age 53)	Virginia Senate; Virginia House of Delegates	University of Richmond (BA); University of Virginia (JD)	March 7, 2023 (special)	Richmond	3 years, 257 days
Virginia 5	John McGuire	Republican	August 24, 1968 (age 58)	Virginia Senate; Virginia House of Delegates; U.S. Navy	Okaloosa-Walton Community College	January 3, 2025	Manakin Sabot	1 year, 320 days
Virginia 6	Ben Cline	Republican	February 29, 1972 (age 54)	Virginia House of Delegates	Bates College (BA); University of Richmond (JD)	January 3, 2019	Fincastle	7 years, 320 days
Virginia 7	Eugene Vindman	Democratic	June 6, 1975 (age 51)	U.S. Army; White House deputy legal advisor	State University of New York at Binghamton (BA); Central Michigan University (MS); University of Georgia (JD); The Judge Advocate General's Legal Center and School (LLM)	January 3, 2025	Dale City	1 year, 320 days
Virginia 8	Don Beyer	Democratic	June 20, 1950 (age 76)	U.S. Ambassador to Switzerland and Liechtenstein; Lieutenant Governor of Virginia	Williams College (BA); George Mason University	January 3, 2015	Alexandria	11 years, 320 days
Virginia 9	Morgan Griffith	Republican	March 15, 1958 (age 68)	Majority Leader of the Virginia House of Delegates	Emory and Henry College (BA); Washington and Lee University (JD)	January 3, 2011	Salem	15 years, 320 days
Virginia 10	Suhas Subramanyam	Democratic	September 26, 1986 (age 40)	Virginia Senate; Virginia House of Delegates	Tulane University (BA); Northwestern University (JD)	January 3, 2025	Brambleton	1 year, 320 days
Virginia 11	James Walkinshaw	Democratic	October 2, 1982 (age 44)	Fairfax County Board of Supervisors	New York University (BA)	September 10, 2025 (special)	Wakefield	1 year, 70 days
Washington 1	Suzan DelBene	Democratic	February 17, 1962 (age 64)	Washington Department of Revenue Director	Reed College (BS); University of Washington (MBA)	November 13, 2012 (special)	Medina	14 years, 6 days
Washington 2	Rick Larsen	Democratic	June 15, 1965 (age 61)	Snohomish County Council	Pacific Lutheran University (BA); University of Minnesota (MPA)	January 3, 2001	Everett	25 years, 320 days
Washington 3	Marie Gluesenkamp Perez	Democratic	June 4, 1988 (age 38)	Washington State Democratic Party executive committee Underwood Soil and Water District Conservation Board of Supervisors; Businesswoman	Reed College (BA)	January 3, 2023	Washougal	3 years, 320 days
Washington 4	Dan Newhouse	Republican	July 10, 1955 (age 71)	Washington House of Representatives	Washington State University (BS)	January 3, 2015	Sunnyside	11 years, 320 days
Washington 5	Michael Baumgartner	Republican	December 13, 1975 (age 50)	Spokane County Treasurer; Washington Senate	Washington State University (BA); Harvard University (MPA)	January 3, 2025	Spokane	1 year, 320 days
Washington 6	Emily Randall	Democratic	October 3, 1985 (age 41)	Washington Senate	Wellesley College (BA)	January 3, 2025	Bremerton	1 year, 320 days
Washington 7	Pramila Jayapal	Democratic	September 21, 1965 (age 61)	Washington State Senate	Georgetown University (BA); Northwestern University (MBA)	January 3, 2017	Seattle	9 years, 320 days
Washington 8	Kim Schrier	Democratic	August 23, 1968 (age 58)	Pediatrician	University of California, Berkeley (BS); University of California, Davis (MD)	January 3, 2019	Sammamish	7 years, 320 days
Washington 9	Adam Smith	Democratic	June 15, 1965 (age 61)	Washington State Senate	Western Washington University; Fordham University (BA); University of Washington (JD)	January 3, 1997	Bellevue	29 years, 320 days
Washington 10	Marilyn Strickland	Democratic	September 25, 1962 (age 64)	Mayor of Tacoma	University of Washington (BA); Clark Atlanta University (MBA)	January 3, 2021	Tacoma	5 years, 320 days
West Virginia 1	Carol Miller	Republican	November 4, 1950 (age 76)	West Virginia House of Delegates	Columbia College, South Carolina (BA)	January 3, 2019	Huntington	7 years, 320 days
West Virginia 2	Riley Moore	Republican	July 1, 1980 (age 46)	West Virginia State Treasurer; West Virginia House of Delegates	George Mason University (BA); National Defense University (MS)	January 3, 2025	Harpers Ferry	1 year, 320 days
Wisconsin 1	Bryan Steil	Republican	March 3, 1981 (age 45)	Congressional aide Attorney	Georgetown University (BS); University of Wisconsin–Madison (JD)	January 3, 2019	Janesville	7 years, 320 days
Wisconsin 2	Mark Pocan	Democratic	August 14, 1964 (age 62)	Wisconsin State Assembly	University of Wisconsin–Madison (BA)	January 3, 2013	Madison	13 years, 320 days
Wisconsin 3	Derrick Van Orden	Republican	September 15, 1969 (age 57)	Actor; Author; Restaurateur; U.S. Navy	Excelsior College (BS); Mitchell Hamline School of Law	January 3, 2023	Prairie du Chien	3 years, 320 days
Wisconsin 4	Gwen Moore	Democratic	April 18, 1951 (age 75)	Wisconsin State Senate; Wisconsin State Assembly	Marquette University (BA)	January 3, 2005	Milwaukee	21 years, 320 days
Wisconsin 5	Scott Fitzgerald	Republican	November 16, 1963 (age 63)	Majority Leader of the Wisconsin State Senate	University of Wisconsin–Oshkosh (BS)	January 3, 2021	Clyman	5 years, 320 days
Wisconsin 6	Glenn Grothman	Republican	July 3, 1955 (age 71)	Wisconsin Senate; Wisconsin State Assembly	University of Wisconsin–Madison (BA, JD)	January 3, 2015	Glenbeulah	11 years, 320 days
Wisconsin 7	Tom Tiffany	Republican	December 30, 1957 (age 68)	Wisconsin Senate; Wisconsin State Assembly	University of Wisconsin–River Falls (BS)	May 19, 2020 (special)	Minocqua	6 years, 184 days
Wisconsin 8	Tony Wied	Republican	May 3, 1976 (age 50)	Businessman	St. Norbert College (BA)	November 12, 2024 (special)	De Pere	2 years, 7 days
Wyoming at-large	Harriet Hageman	Republican	October 18, 1962 (age 64)	Lawyer; Law clerk for the U.S. Court of Appeals for the Tenth Circuit	University of Wyoming (BS, JD)	January 3, 2023	Cheyenne	3 years, 320 days

== List of delegates ==
List of delegates as of January 3, 2025:
District	Member	Party	Born	Prior experience	Education	Assumed office	Residence
American Samoa at-large	Amata Coleman Radewagen	Republican	December 29, 1947 (age 78)	Political aide	University of Guam (BS); Loyola Marymount University; George Mason University	January 3, 2015	Pago Pago
District of Columbia at-large	Eleanor Holmes Norton	Democratic	June 13, 1937 (age 89)	Equal Employment Opportunity Commission Chair	Antioch College (BA); Yale University (MA, LLB)	January 3, 1991	Washington, D.C.
Guam at-large	James Moylan	Republican	July 18, 1962 (age 64)	Guam Legislature; U.S. Army	University of Guam (BS)	January 3, 2023	Tumon
Northern Mariana Islands at-large	Kimberlyn King-Hinds	Republican	April 10, 1975 (age 51)	Mayor of Tinian Chief of Staff; Tinian Youth Center Executive Director; Northern Marianas College Board of Regents; Northern Mariana Islands Settlement Fund legal counsel Commonwealth Ports Authority Board Chair; Commonwealth Public Utilities Commission; Special Assistant for Community and Projects to the Lieutenant Governor of the Northern Mariana Islands	Loyola Marymount University (BA); University of Hawai'i at Mānoa (MHRM, JD)	January 3, 2025	Tinian
Puerto Rico at-large	Pablo Hernández Rivera	Democratic/Popular Democratic (Note: Resident Commissioner Hernández Rivera caucuses with the Democrats)	May 11, 1991 (age 35)	Businessman	Harvard University (BA); Stanford University (JD)	January 3, 2025	San Juan
United States Virgin Islands at-large	Stacey Plaskett	Democratic	May 13, 1966 (age 60)	Attorney	Georgetown University (BS); American University (JD)	January 3, 2015	St. Croix

== See also ==
- List of current United States senators
- List of members of the United States Congress by longevity of service
- List of United States congressional districts
- List of United States congressional joint committees
- List of United States House of Representatives committees
- Seniority in the United States House of Representatives
- Shadow congressperson – Delegates of U.S. territories or Washington, D.C. seeking statehood
