= Sheboygan Falls Subdivision =

Overview
- Owner: Union Pacific Railroad; Wisconsin and Southern Railroad

Technical
- Line length: 14 mi (23 km)
- Track gauge: 1,435 mm (4 ft 8 1/2 in) standard gauge

The Sheboygan Falls Subdivision is a railway line in the state of Wisconsin. It runs 14 miles (23 km) between Sheboygan, Wisconsin, and Plymouth, Wisconsin. Ownership is split between Wisconsin and Southern Railroad and the Union Pacific Railroad. The line was originally built in 1859–1860 by the Sheboygan and Mississippi Railroad.

== History ==
The Sheboygan and Mississippi Railroad constructed a railway line between Sheboygan, Wisconsin, and Glenbeulah, Wisconsin, between 1859 and 1860. The company went bankrupt in 1861 and was reorganized as the Sheboygan and Fond du Lac Railroad. The Sheboygan and Fond du Lac Railroad continued building westward, reaching Fond du Lac, Wisconsin, in 1868 and Princeton, Wisconsin, in 1871. Ownership of the line passed in 1880 to the Sheboygan and Western Railway, which was consolidated with two other companies in 1881 to create the Chicago, Milwaukee and North Western Railway. The Chicago and North Western Railway acquired that company in 1883.

The Chicago and North Western abandoned the line west of Plymouth in 1952. The Union Pacific Railroad acquired the Chicago and North Western in 1995. In 2005, the Wisconsin and Southern Railroad acquired the line between Plymouth and Sheboygan Falls, Wisconsin. The remnant of the line between Sheboygan and Sheboygan Falls is owned by the Union Pacific and known as the Kohler Industrial Lead.
