= Edwin Slade =

American politician

Edwin Slade (March 25, 1826 – May 29, 1901) was an American businessman and politician.

Born in Westport, Massachusetts, Slade was in the boot and shoe business. In 1857, Slade moved to Wisconsin and settled in Glenbeulah, Wisconsin. He owned a general store and was in the drug and railroad business. Slade served as postmaster for Glenbeulah, Wisconsin. In 1865, Slade served in the Wisconsin State Assembly and was a member of the Republican Party. In 1890, Slade moved to Pasadena, California. He was president of the Dillingham Manufacturing Company. He died in Pasadena, Wisconsin.
