= Thomas Armstrong (Wisconsin politician) =

American politician

Member of the Wisconsin State Assembly
- In office 1916–1918

Personal details
- Born: August 22, 1858 Brampton, Canada West
- Died: July 23, 1927 (aged 68) Green Bay, Wisconsin
- Party: Republican

Thomas W. Armstrong (August 22, 1858 – July 23, 1927) was a Canadian-born American businessman and politician who served as a member of the Wisconsin State Assembly from 1916 to 1918.

== Early life ==
Born in Brampton, Canada West, Armstrong emigrated to the United States with his parents and settled in Glenbeulah, Wisconsin. He attended Glenbeulah public schools.

== Career ==
Armstrong began his career as a railroad brakeman and conductor. In 1898, Armstrong opened a buffet in Kaukauna, Wisconsin. He served on the Kaukauna Common Council and the Kaukauna Utility Commission. From 1916 to 1918, Armstrong served in the Wisconsin State Assembly as a Republican.

== Death ==
Armstrong died in Green Bay, Wisconsin of complications from surgery.
