= Carolina College of Biblical Studies =

Coordinates: 35.0513°N 78.9395°W

- Former name: Carolina Bible College
- Type: Private Bible college
- Established: 1973
- President: Bill F. Korver
- Location: Fayetteville, North Carolina, United States
- Website: ccbs.edu

Carolina College of Biblical Studies (formerly Carolina Bible College) is a private nondenominational Bible college in Fayetteville, North Carolina, United States. It offers associate and bachelor's degree programs in Biblical Studies. Several non-degree certificates are also available.

== History ==
Carolina College of Biblical Studies was founded as the Cape Fear School of Theology in 1973 by Bill Owens. In 1978, Ralph Richardson took over the leadership role. A site was purchased and classes started in 1980, at which time the name of the school was changed to Carolina Bible College. Bill Korver became the college's fourth president in April 2004. In April 2012, its name was changed to Carolina College of Biblical Studies.

In 2012, the college listed 20 faculty members, all of whom held at least a master's degree. More than 25% held earned doctorates. Nearly all were active in local church or para-church ministries.

== Academics ==
The college is accredited by the Association for Biblical Higher Education. It is a member of the Association of Christian Schools International, the Association of Christian Continuing Education Schools and Seminaries, and the Evangelical Council for Financial Accountability.

== Campus ==
The college is located on 3 acres (12,000 m^{2}) in Fayetteville with one main building housing the chapel, classrooms, offices and library. The College is approximately 2 miles (3.2 km) from Cross Creek Mall and approximately 10 miles (16 km) west of Interstate 95.

== Student body ==
The college primarily serves adult learners. Courses are offered mornings, afternoons, and evenings as well as online. The student-to-faculty ratio is 15:1. Students are racially diverse, with nearly equal numbers of men and women. They come from more than 20 church denominations and independent churches.
