= Glenbeulah, Wisconsin =

- Village
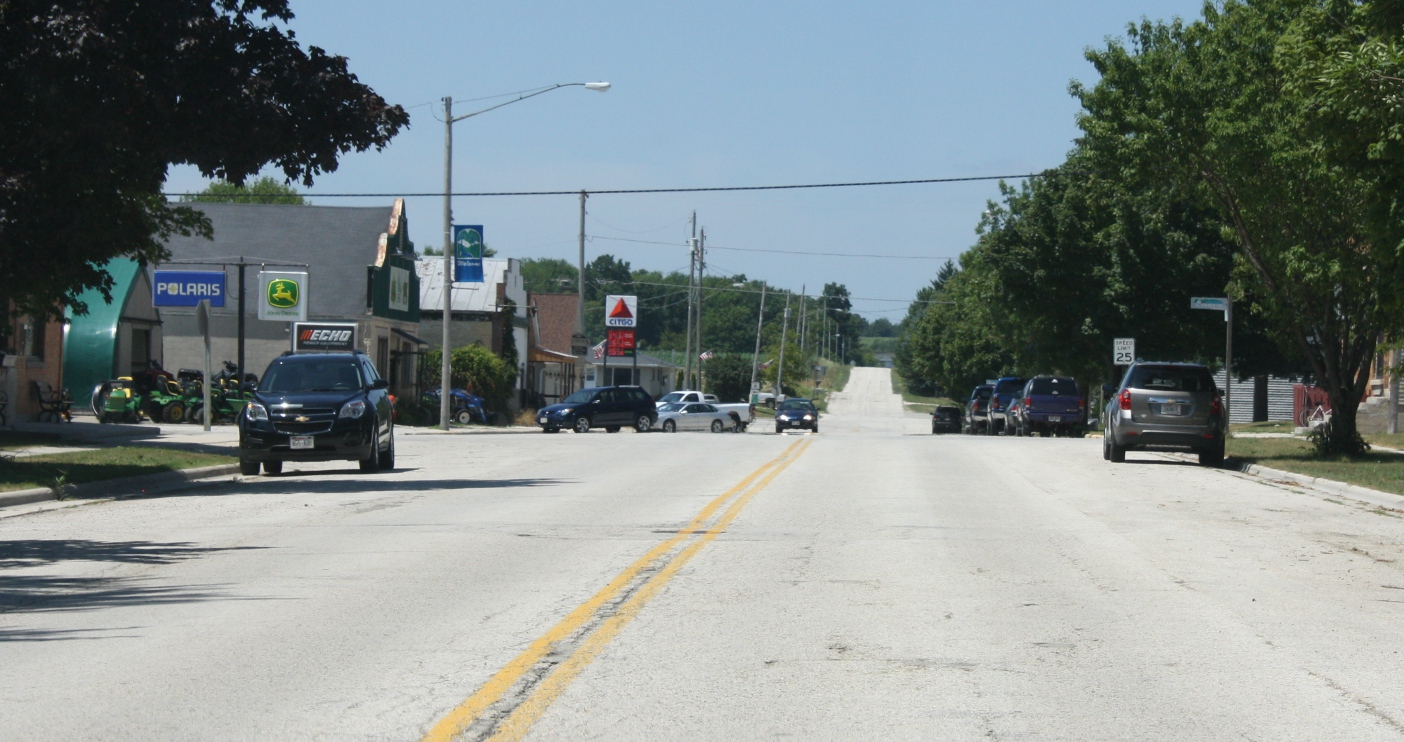
- Looking west in downtown Glenbeulah

- Location of Glenbeulah in Sheboygan County, Wisconsin.
- Coordinates: 43°47′48″N 88°2′45″W
- Country: United States
- State: Wisconsin
- County: Sheboygan

Area
  - Total: 0.72 sq mi (1.87 km^{2})
  - Land: 0.69 sq mi (1.80 km^{2})
  - Water: 0.027 sq mi (0.07 km^{2})
- Elevation: 978 ft (298 m)

Population (2020)
  - Total: 451
  - Density: 649/sq mi (251/km^{2})
- Time zone: UTC-6 (Central (CST))
  - Summer (DST): UTC-5 (CDT)
- Area code: 920
- FIPS code: 55-29350
- GNIS feature ID: 1565565
- Website: glenbeulahwi.gov

Glenbeulah is a village in Sheboygan County, Wisconsin, United States. The population was 451 at the 2020 census. It is included in the Sheboygan, Wisconsin Metropolitan Statistical Area. Glenbeulah is situated on the Mullet River.

== History ==
A post office called Glenbeulah has been in operation since 1860. Glenbeulah was named from its setting in a glen, and in honor of Beulah, the mother of a railroad contractor.

== Geography ==
Glenbeulah is located at 43°47′48″N 88°2′45″W (43.796630, -88.045834).

According to the United States Census Bureau, the village has a total area of 0.71 square miles (1.84 km^{2}), of which 0.68 square miles (1.76 km^{2}) is land and 0.03 square miles (0.08 km^{2}) is water.

== Demographics ==
Historical population
Census	Pop.	Note	%±
1880	375		—
1920	298		—
1930	284		−4.7%
1940	357		25.7%
1950	384		7.6%
1960	428		11.5%
1970	496		15.9%
1980	423		−14.7%
1990	386		−8.7%
2000	378		−2.1%
2010	463		22.5%
2020	451		−2.6%
U.S. Decennial Census

=== 2020 census ===
Glenbeulah village, Wisconsin – Racial and ethnic composition Note: the US Census treats Hispanic/Latino as an ethnic category. This table excludes Latinos from the racial categories and assigns them to a separate category. Hispanics/Latinos may be of any race.
Race / Ethnicity (NH = Non-Hispanic)	Pop 2000	Pop 2010	Pop 2020	% 2000	% 2010	% 2020
White alone (NH)	375	456	448	99.21%	98.49%	99.33%
Black or African American alone (NH)	0	0	0	0.00%	0.00%	0.00%
Native American or Alaska Native alone (NH)	0	1	0	0.00%	0.22%	0.00%
Asian alone (NH)	0	0	0	0.00%	0.00%	0.00%
Pacific Islander alone (NH)	0	0	0	0.00%	0.00%	0.00%
Other race alone (NH)	1	0	0	0.26%	0.00%	0.00%
Mixed race or Multiracial (NH)	0	1	3	0.00%	0.22%	0.67%
Hispanic or Latino (any race)	2	5	0	0.53%	1.08%	0.00%
Total	378	463	451	100.00%	100.00%	100.00%

=== 2010 census ===
As of the census of 2010, there were 463 people, 194 households, and 134 families living in the village. The population density was 680.9 inhabitants per square mile (262.9/km^{2}). There were 204 housing units at an average density of 300.0 per square mile (115.8/km^{2}). The racial makeup of the village was 98.7% White, 0.2% Native American, 0.4% from other races, and 0.6% from two or more races. Hispanic or Latino of any race were 1.1% of the population.

There were 194 households, of which 32.0% had children under the age of 18 living with them, 55.7% were married couples living together, 7.2% had a female householder with no husband present, 6.2% had a male householder with no wife present, and 30.9% were non-families. 22.2% of all households were made up of individuals, and 9.7% had someone living alone who was 65 years of age or older. The average household size was 2.39 and the average family size was 2.81.

The median age in the village was 41.4 years. 22% of residents were under the age of 18; 5% were between the ages of 18 and 24; 27.8% were from 25 to 44; 33.1% were from 45 to 64; and 12.1% were 65 years of age or older. The gender makeup of the village was 50.8% male and 49.2% female.

=== 2000 census ===
As of the census of 2000, there were 378 people, 153 households, and 108 families living in the village. The population density was 563.2 people per square mile (217.8/km^{2}). There were 160 housing units at an average density of 238.4 per square mile (92.2/km^{2}). The racial makeup of the village was 99.47% White, 0.53% from other races. Hispanic or Latino of any race were 0.53% of the population.

There were 153 households, out of which 33.3% had children under the age of 18 living with them, 61.4% were married couples living together, 6.5% had a female householder with no husband present, and 29.4% were non-families. 22.9% of all households were made up of individuals, and 7.8% had someone living alone who was 65 years of age or older. The average household size was 2.47 and the average family size was 2.97.

In the village, the population was spread out, with 24.1% under the age of 18, 7.1% from 18 to 24, 33.6% from 25 to 44, 22.8% from 45 to 64, and 12.4% who were 65 years of age or older. The median age was 37 years. For every 100 females, there were 103.2 males. For every 100 females age 18 and over, there were 99.3 males.

The median income for a household in the village was $42,656, and the median income for a family was $47,045. Males had a median income of $32,411 versus $20,568 for females. The per capita income for the village was $17,240. None of the families and 1.9% of the population were living below the poverty line, including no under eighteens and 10.3% of those over 64.

=== German community ===
Residents of Glenbeulah are primarily of ethnic German descent comprising over 70% of the population. Per the 2023 American Community Survey five-year estimates, the German American population was 320.

== Notable people ==
- Thomas Armstrong, Wisconsin state representative
- Emery Crosby, Wisconsin state representative
- Glenn Grothman, U.S. representative from Wisconsin
- Edwin Slade, Wisconsin state representative
- William Van Pelt, U.S. representative from Wisconsin

== Images ==
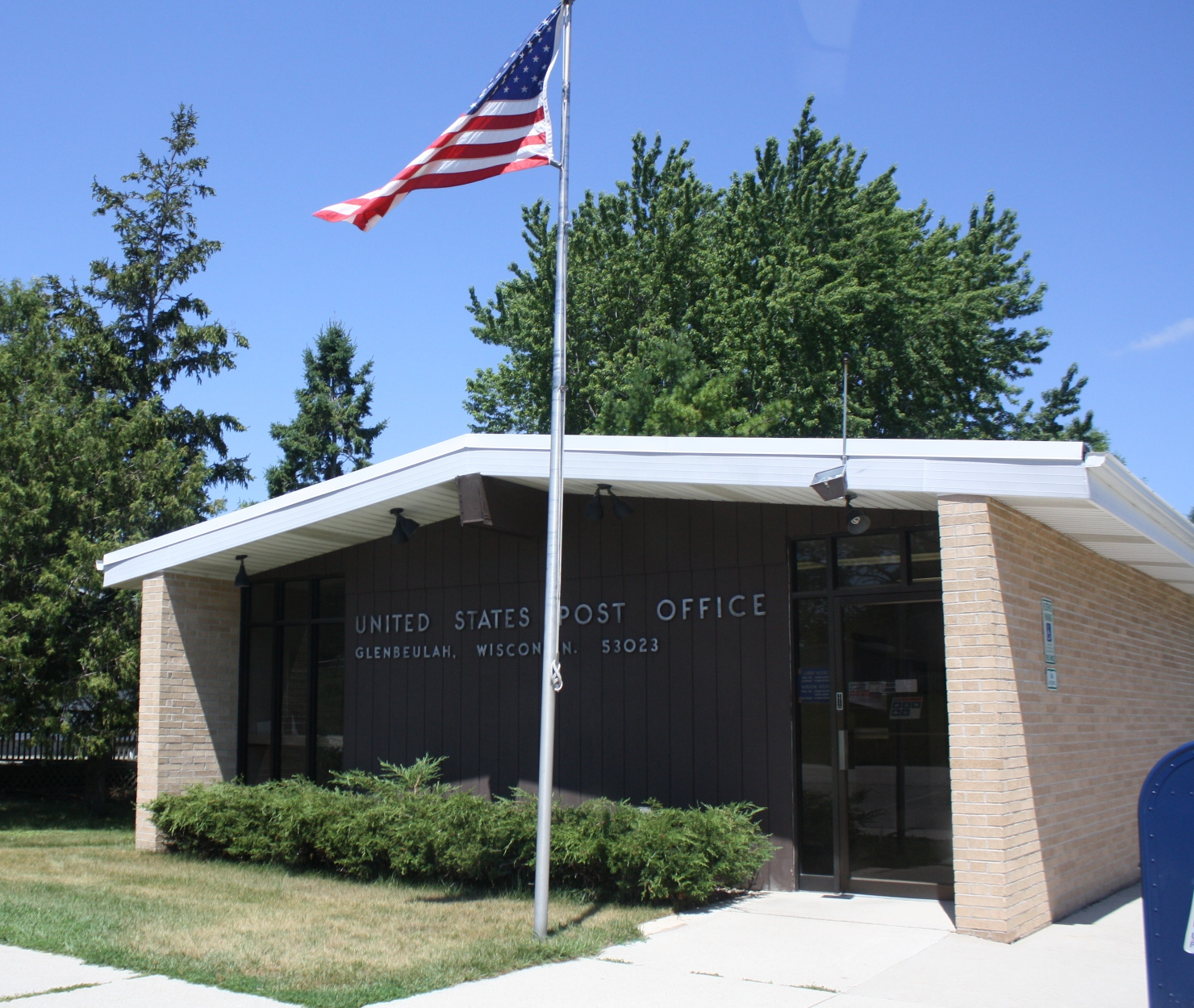
Post office

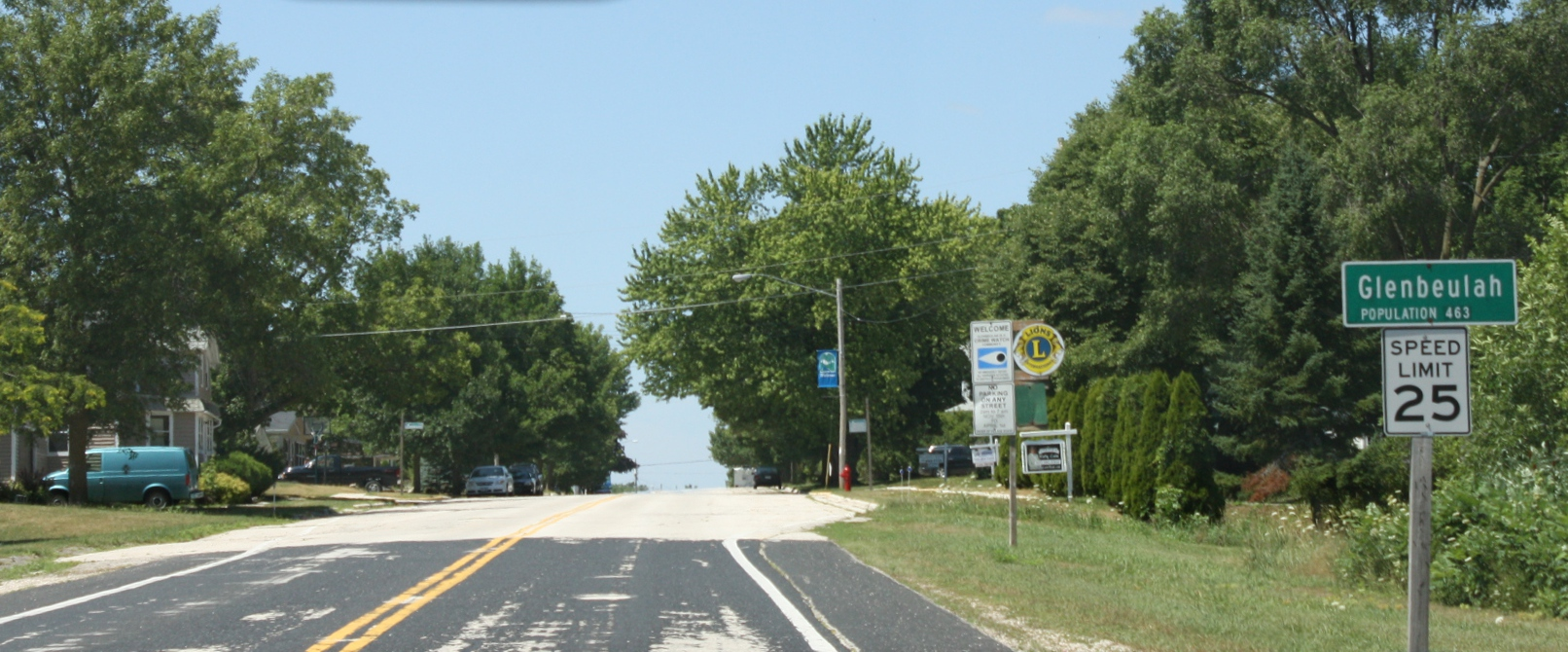
Looking west at the sign for Glenbeulah

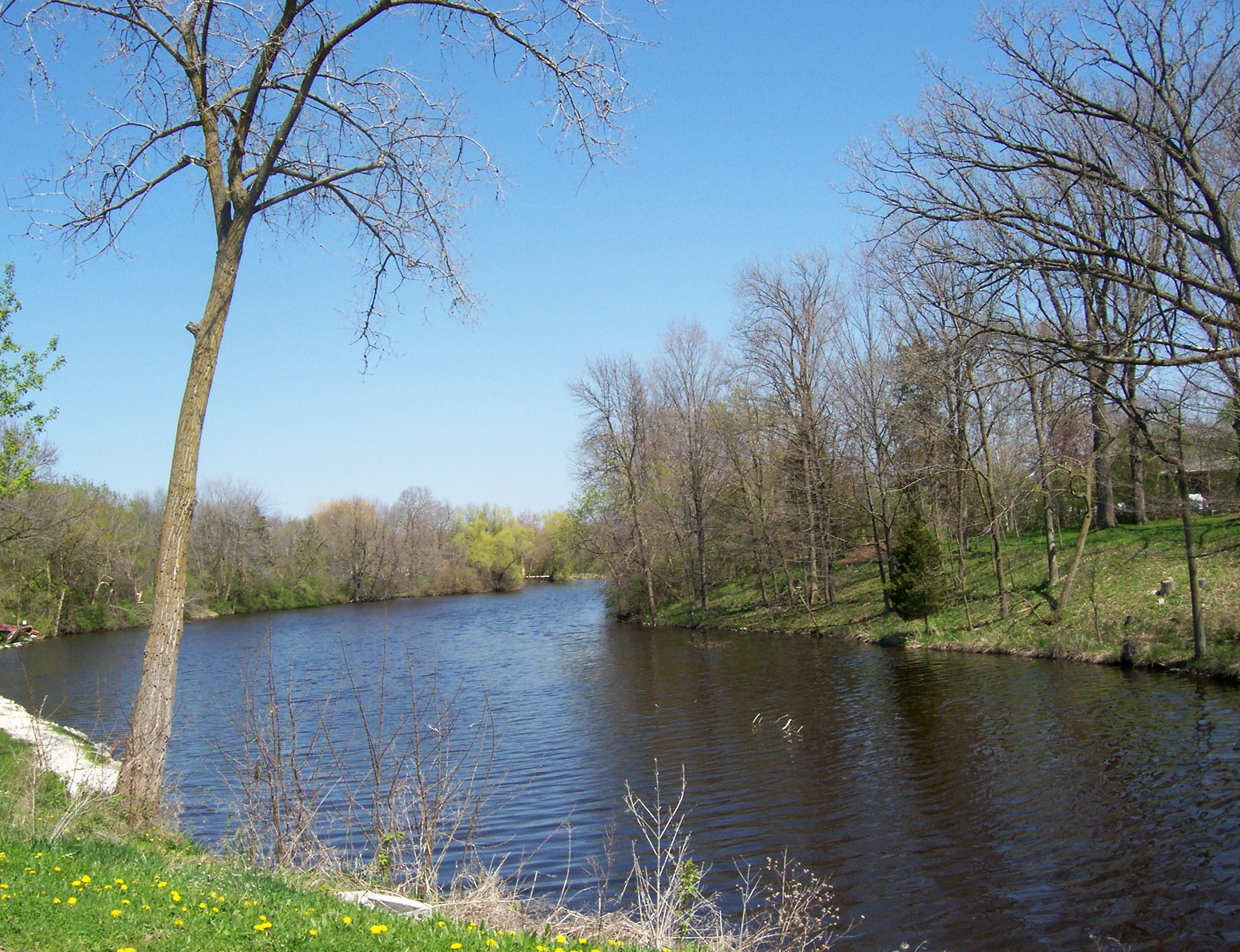
Looking east at the Mullet River in Glenbeulah

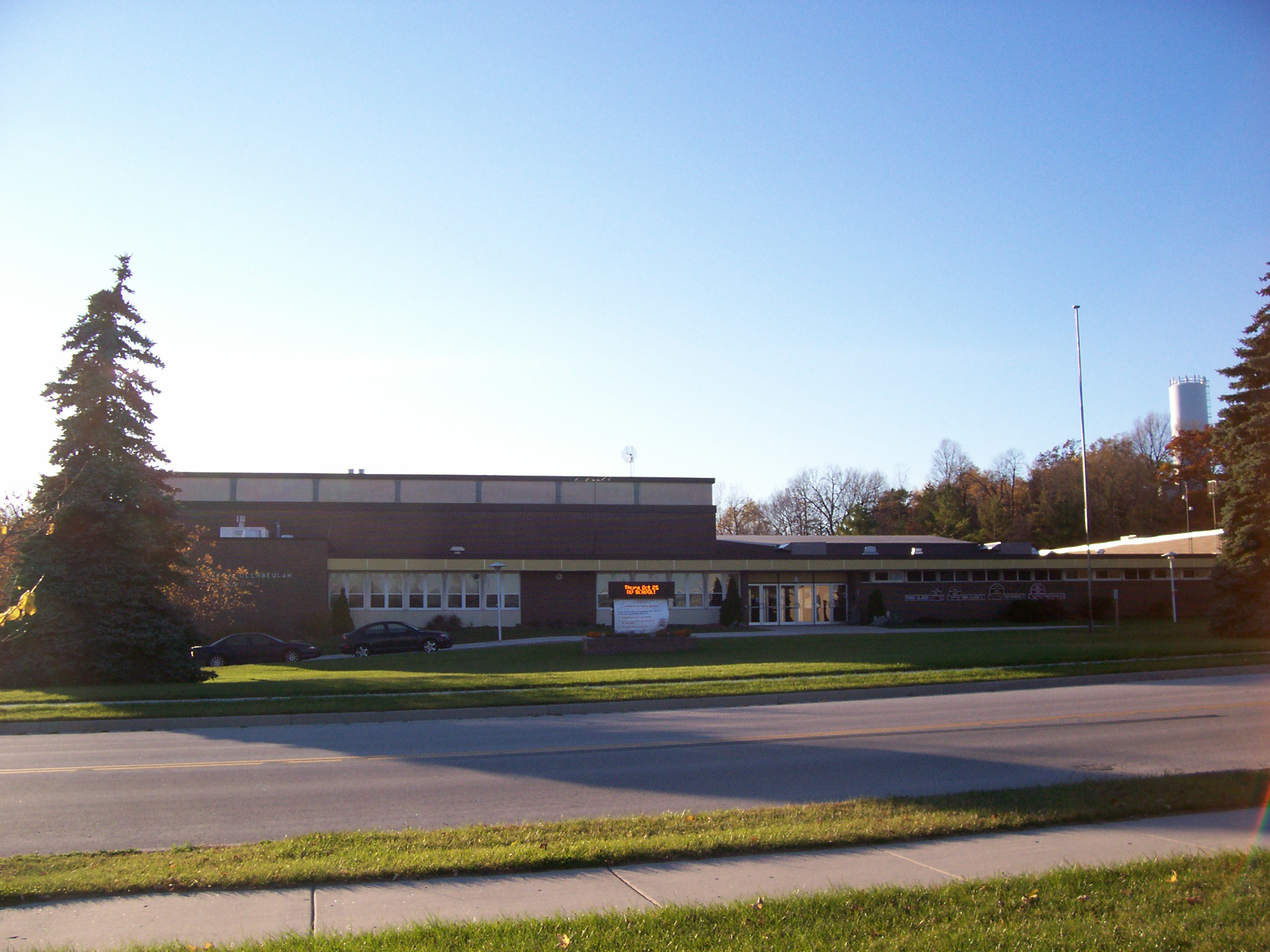
Elkhart Lake/Glenbeulah High School

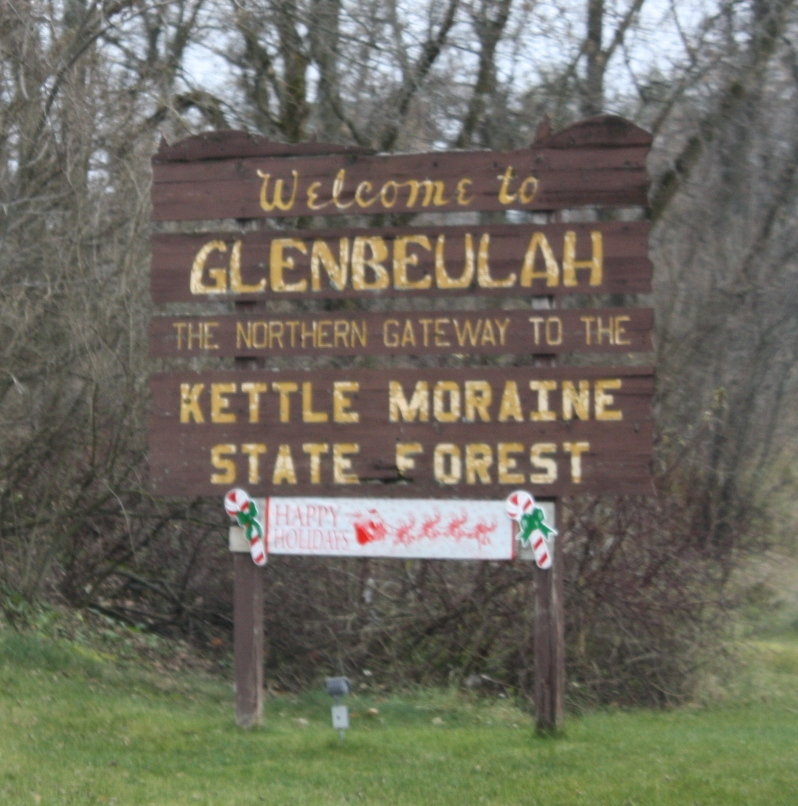
Village welcome sign

== See also ==
- List of villages in Wisconsin
