= Chicago and North Western R-1 class =

Class of 325 American 4-6-0 locomotives

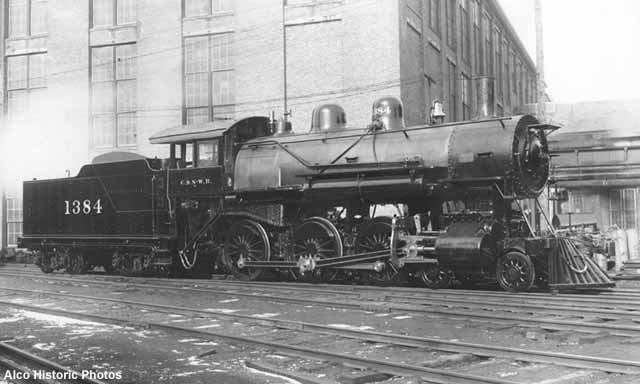
- 1907 builder's photo of C&NW R-1 No. 1384
Type and origin
- Power type: Steam
- Builder: Schenectady Locomotive Works (20); American Locomotive Company (220); Baldwin Locomotive Works (85)
- Serial number: see table
- Build date: 1901–1908
- Total produced: 325
Specifications
- Configuration
  - Whyte: 4-6-0
  - UIC: 2′C n2
- Gauge: 4 ft 8 1/2 in (1,435 mm)
- Trucks: Truck No. 3
- Leading dia.: 30 in (0.762 m)
- Driver dia.: 63 in (1.600 m)
- Tender wheels: 33 in (0.838 m)
- Minimum curve: 301 ft (92 m) radius/ 19°
- Wheelbase
  - Engine: 25 ft 10 in (7.87 m)
  - Leading: 6 ft 4 in (1.93 m)
  - Drivers: 14 ft 10 in (4.52 m)
- Height: 14 ft 11 5/8 in (4.56 m)
- Adhesive weight: 126,000 lb (57,000 kg) (Stephenson-powered); 135,000 lb (61,000 kg) (Walschaerts-powered)
- Loco weight: 144,500–162,500 lb (65,500–73,700 kg) (Stephenson-powered); 181,000 lb (82,000 kg) (Walschaerts-powered)
- Tender weight: 61,500–140,000 lb (27,900–63,500 kg)
- Total weight: 273,460–306,500 lb (124,040–139,030 kg)
- Fuel type: Coal, Oil
- Fuel capacity: 9–10 tonnes (8.9–9.8 long tons; 9.9–11.0 short tons)
- Water cap.: 5,400–7,500 US gal (20,000–28,000 L; 4,500–6,200 imp gal)
- Firebox
  - Type: Radial stay (round-top)
  - Grate area: 46.27 sq ft (4.299 m^{2}) (102 in × 65 1/4 in or 2.591 m × 1.657 m)
- Boiler
  - Diameter: 66 1/4 in (1.683 m)
  - Small tubes: 2 in (51 mm)
  - Large tubes: 5 3/8 in (137 mm)
- Boiler pressure: 200 psi (1,400 kPa)
- Heating surface
  - Firebox: 152.00 sq ft (14.121 m^{2})
  - Tubes and flues: 2,333.24–2,850.00 sq ft (216.765–264.774 m^{2})
  - Total surface: 2,508.98–3,030.27 sq ft (233.092–281.521 m^{2})
- Cylinders: Two
- Cylinder size: 21 in × 26 in (533 mm × 660 mm)
- Valve gear: Stephenson, Walschaerts
Performance figures
- Tractive effort: 30,900 lbf (137 kN)
- Factor of adh.: 4.08 (Stephenson-powered); 4.37 (Walschaerts-powered)
Career
- Operators: Chicago and North Western Railroad
- Class: R-1
- Numbers: see table
- Delivered: 1901–1908
- Retired: 1929–1956
- Preserved: 175, 444, 1385
- Disposition: Three preserved, remainder scrapped

The Chicago and North Western R-1 class is a class of 325 4-6-0 "Ten-Wheeler" steam locomotives built by the Schenectady Locomotive Works, the American Locomotive Company, and the Baldwin Locomotive Works from 1901 to 1908. The R-1 locomotives were so large and heavy that the Chicago and North Western (C&NW) Railroad had to extensively rebuild their trackage, bridges, tunnels, turntables, and enginehouses to accommodate them.

The R-1s were widely considered to be one of the most reliable classes of locomotives on the C&NW's roster. They were able to travel all across the C&NW system by the 1940s, and they received varying modifications, including superheater installations and conversions to burn oil. The R-1 class also served as the basis for the Chicago, St. Paul, Minneapolis and Omaha (CMO) Railway's I-1 and K-1 classes. As of 2026, only three R-1 locomotives are preserved; two are undergoing restoration to operating condition, while one remains on static display.

== History ==
=== Development ===
After the year 1900, railroad traffic in the United States was constantly growing, and existing locomotive rosters and rail infrastructures were becoming inadequate. By that time, the Chicago and North Western Railroad (C&NW) experimented with various firebox designs on steam locomotives to meet the demand for greater motive power. They rostered 250 4-6-0 "ten-wheeler" locomotives that were divided into seven classes, including the R class locomotives built between 1897 and 1900, and they all came with larger fireboxes that were placed above the frame, as opposed to in between the frame and the wheels. This allowed for a larger grate area and a larger fire.

In 1899, the C&NW created a new boiler design with a 56-inch (1,422 mm) wide firebox, 16-foot (5 m) long boiler tubes, and a 200 psi (1,379 kPa) boiler pressure. The following year, this boiler design was applied to the first of the railroad's D class 4-4-2 "Atlantic" type locomotives. With the D class 4-4-2s earning recognition for their good performance, a freight locomotive design with the new boiler was being developed.

=== Design and construction ===
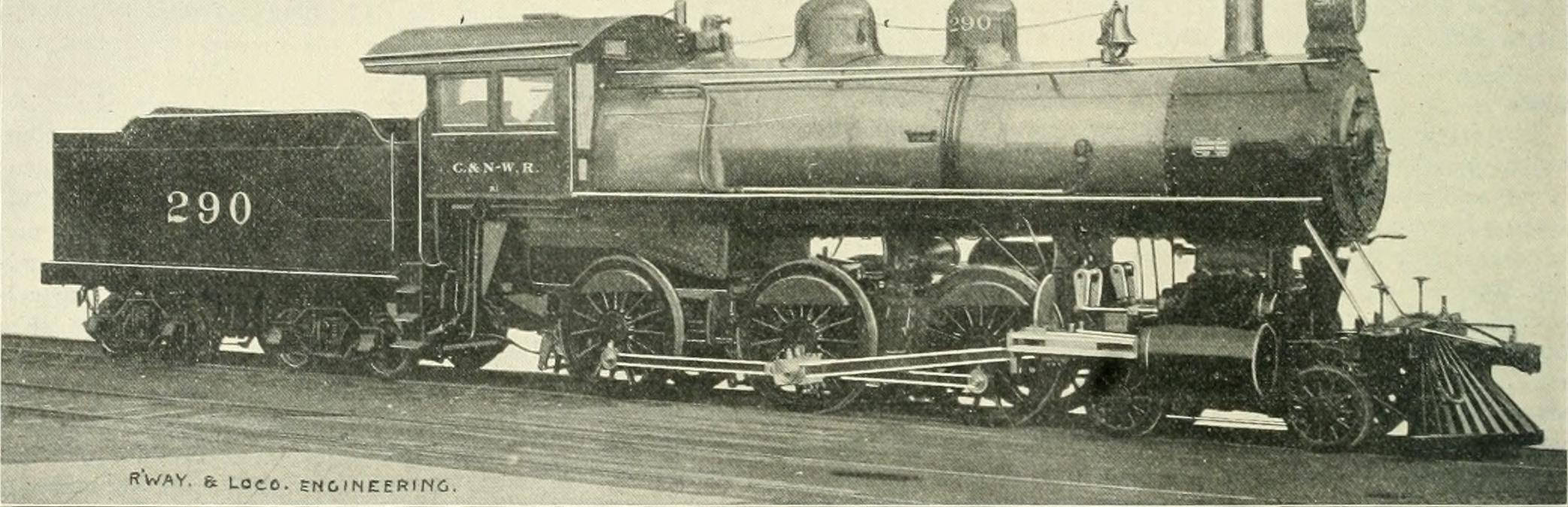
Builder's photograph of C&NW No. 290, one of the initial R-1s built by the Schenectady Locomotive Works in 1901

The new locomotive design was destined to be an upgrade to the R class, with its classification name being the R-1. The R-1 design was to be equipped with 63-inch (1,600 mm) diameter driving wheels, and the boiler and firebox were to be lifted and carried over the driving wheels. The rear section of the R-1 boiler with the firebox was to be larger than that of the D class at 74 inches (1,880 mm) in diameter, while the front section of the boiler was to be smaller at 66 inches (1,676 mm). The cylinders were to be 21 inches (533 mm) in diameter, making the cylinders the largest to ever be applied to a C&NW locomotive at the time.

On January 1, 1901, the C&NW placed their first order of twenty R-1 locomotives to be built by the Schenectady Locomotive Works (SLW). Additional orders of R-1s would be made, following SLW's merger into the American Locomotive Company (ALCO). Aside from the new boiler design, a new valve design, larger cylinders, and innovative steam generating equipment, the first twenty-seven R-1 locomotives shared identical construction qualities with the R class.

In the fall of 1902, with the availability of technilogical improvements, the C&NW made multiple alterations to the R-1 design; four-bar crosshead guides were replaced with alligator crosshead guides, bolts were replaced with rivets for the boiler, and cast iron was replaced with steel for multiple parts of the locomotive. The alterations added 2,000 pounds (907 kg) of weight for the locomotive, with the driving wheels bearing a large portion of it. ALCO built and delivered thirty R-1 locomotives with the new alterations in 1902 and 1903, with an additional forty-five being delivered from the Baldwin Locomotive Works (BLW); BLW marked their R-1s as 10-36-D in their classification system.

The first fifty-seven R-1 locomotives were built with tenders that held 5,400 U.S. gallons (20,441 L) of water and 9 tonnes (8.9 long tons; 9.9 short tons) of coal; they were smaller than the tenders of the R class. The tenders were built at a smaller scale, because most C&NW turntables at the time were found to be too short to fit an R-1 with a longer tender. BLW's forty-five R-1s from 1903 were built with tenders that held 6,000 U.S. gallons (22,712 L) of water and the same coal capacity as the older tender design. Beginning in 1905, the rest of the R-1 locomotives were built with larger tenders that held 7,500 U.S. gallons (28,391 L) of water and 10 tonnes (9.8 long tons; 11.0 short tons) of coal.

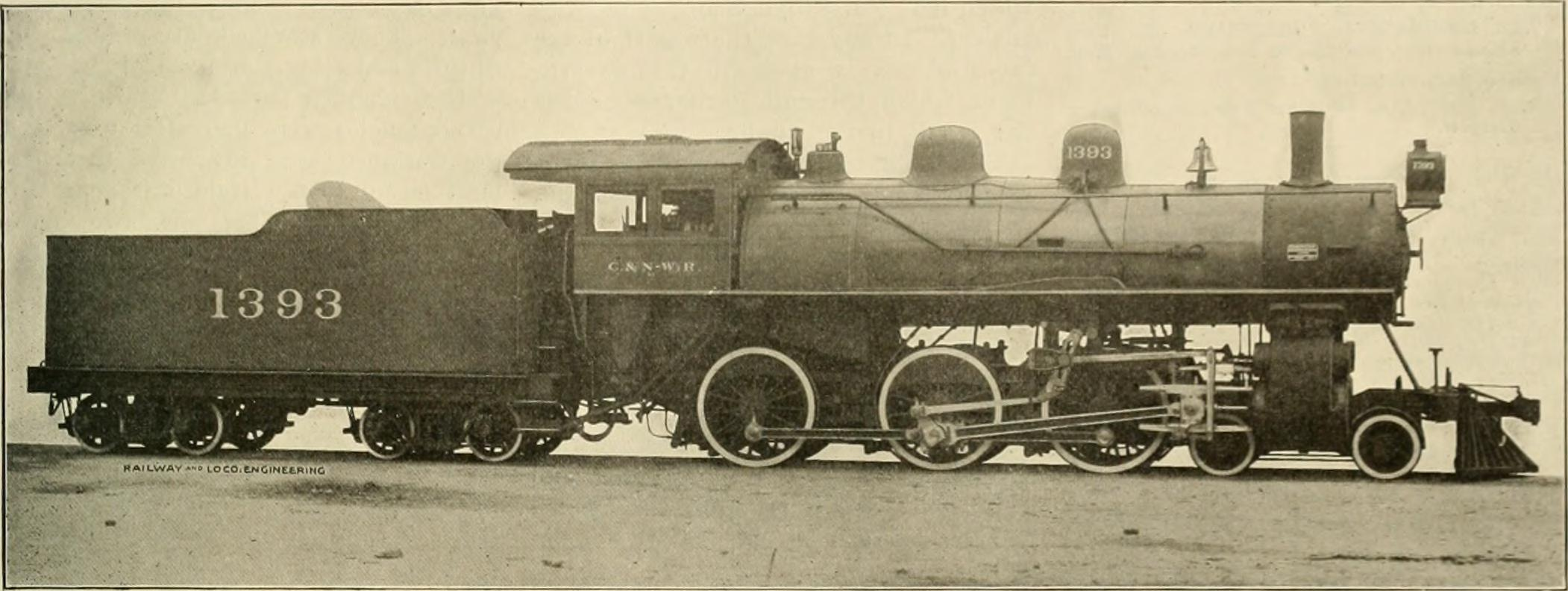
1907 builder's photo of C&NW No. 1393, the first R-1 equipped with Walschaerts valve gear

In September 1904, the C&NW asked ALCO to construct one D class 4-4-2 (No. 1300) and one R-1 class 4-6-0 (No. 76) with superheated boilers. After they entered service, the C&NW became unsatisfied with their performance, and no further Ds or R-1s were built new with superheaters.

Most R-1 locomotives were applied with Stephenson valve gear, but the increased size of the axles and strength requirements resulted in greater wear and tear on the Stephenson eccentric rods on the R-1's running gear, despite the later locomotives being built with improved metal. At the same time, Walschaerts valve gear was becoming available on American steam locomotive technology. In early 1907, the C&NW placed an order of thirty R-1s from ALCO, and in doing so, they asked for five of the locomotives (Nos. 1393–1397) to be applied with Walschaerts valve gear for testing.

While the Walschaerts application made the five locomotives several thousand pounds (kg) heavier than any Stephenson-powered R-1, their performance was deemed a success. The C&NW subsequently asked BLW and ALCO to build and deliver thirty-five (ten from BLW; twenty-five from ALCO) additional Walschaerts-powered R-1s throughout 1908. By the time production on the R-1 class ended in December 1908, 325 locomotives of the class were built, making the R-1s the most manufactured class of steam locomotives on the C&NW.

Table of orders and numbers
| Year | Quantity | Manufacturer | Serial numbers | C&NW numbers | Notes |
|---|---|---|---|---|---|
| 1901 | 16 | Schenectady | 5844–5859 | 168/78, 287/89–91/95, 896, 910–12/22/39, 1041/42 | |
| 1901 | 4 | Schenectady | 6206–6209 | 160, 594–596 | |
| 1902 | 14 | Alco | 25397–25410 | 1066–1079 | |
| 1902 | 9 | Alco | 26530–26538 | 1102–1110 | |
| 1903 | 14 | Alco | 27581–27594 | 1111–1124 | |
| 1903 | 45 | Baldwin | 22509/19/39/40/63/67/68/76, 22624/25, 22701/18/58/65/73/80, 22818/24/35/43/61/64/86, 22909/35/36/50/71/94, 23004/25/32/67/68/83/84/94, 23102/16/17/25/34/55/84, 23217 | 1125–1169 | |
| 1905 | 18 | Alco | 30299–30316 | 76, 416/41/51/54/66/78/76/81/83, 236/37, 479, 916/17, 462/63 | |
| 1905 | 15 | Alco | 30595–30609 | 469–474/80/84–91 | |
| 1906 | 30 | Alco | 38513–38542 | 411–14/17/18/22–25/29/40/42/44–49, 899, 915/23/24, 1219–1222/29–31 | |
| 1906 | 35 | Alco | 39212–39246 | 1333–1367 | |
| 1907 | 30 | Baldwin | 31547–49/59–62/85–88, 31618–23/73/87/88, 31734/45–47/84, 31830/55/56/84, 31914 | 18, 29, 38, 44, 50, 61, 62, 122/59/61/82/84/85, 245, 343–45/48/49/59/60, 452, 555, 925/34–38/60 | |
| 1907 | 30 | Alco | 42170–42199 | 1368–1397 | |
| 1907 | 30 | Alco | 42399–42428 | 1398–1427 | |
| 1908 | 10 | Baldwin | 32567/74/94, 32602–04/26/45/60/61 | 1323–1332 | |
| 1908 | 25 | Alco | 45726–45750 | 172/75, 375–80/82/83/85/86/88, 406/50/53/55–58, 893/94, 926/27/52 | |

=== Service ===
The R-1 locomotives were primarily designed as dual-service locomotives to pull both passenger and freight trains. Because the R-1s were larger and heavier than any other C&NW locomotive before them, their route availability was drastically limited, so the C&NW initiated a program to upgrade their entire rail infrastructure to accommodate them. The railroad rebuilt several miles of trackage and bridges with enough heavy weight to support an R-1. Existing roundhouse stalls proved to be too short for the R-1s to fit inside, so some of them were extended to allow the R-1s to be serviced indoors, and bigger roundhouses and terminals were eventually constructed to allow room for larger locomotives.

By the end of 1902, the R-1s were allowed to operate on certain routes on the Wisconsin Division, but they were restricted from running anywhere on the Iowa and Minnesota divisions until 1910. By the 1920s, the C&NW had completed many miles of track upgrades for use by the R-1s and other large locomotives, but the R-1s were still restricted from running on certain branchlines, due to short, light-weight turntables; some turntables were replaced with extended wye tracks for easier turning. By 1939, the R-1's limited route availabilities were lifted, and they were permitted to travel anywhere on the C&NW system, when necessary.

When steam-heated passenger cars became common on branch lines, several of the R-1s could not pull passenger trains, due to their lack of steam-heating equipment. All forty Walschaerts-powered R-1s were built with steam-heating and air signal line equipment, so they were assigned to passenger service for most of their working spans. Some R-1s were also used to pull the C&NW's Flambeau 400 connection trains between Watersmeet, Michigan and Monico, Wisconsin. While the C&NW acquired larger locomotives after 1908, such as the Z class 2-8-0 "Consolidations" from 1909, the J class 2-8-2 "Mikados" from 1913, and the H class 4-8-4 "Northerns" from 1929, none of them could replace the R-1s on many of the railroad's routes, due to weight restrictions. After 1920, the R-1s were primarily relegated to branch line services, but they were still occasionally used to pull mainline trains and for switching services.

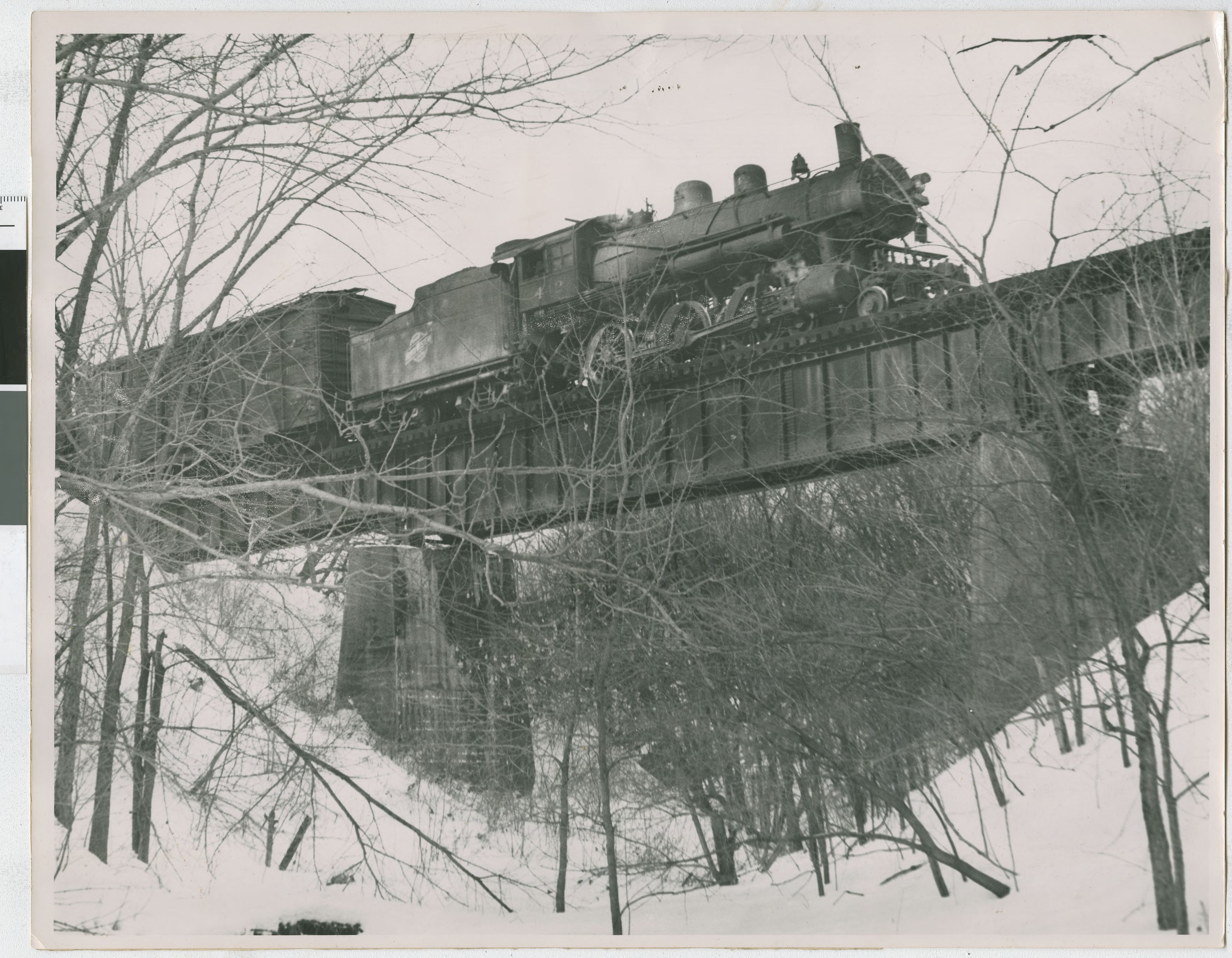
C&NW R-1 No. 442 operating in Blue Earth County, Minnesota

==== Modifications ====
After testing five E class locomotives in 1910, the C&NW decided that superheated technology had improved for steam locomotives, so they began to modify their existing steam fleet with superheated boilers, with the R-1s receiving superheaters beginning in 1915. By the 1930s, most R-1 locomotives were equipped with superheaters. Also in 1915, the railroad made plans to rebuild some of the R-1s with larger cylindrical boilers, with the front section to be 72 inches (1,829 mm) in diameter. Despite the intervention from World War I and the United States Railroad Administration (USRA), the C&NW moved forward with the cylindrical boiler installations, with the process beginning in 1922.

Beginning in 1911, the C&NW converted a number of their R-1 locomotives from coal-firing to oil-firing, to allow them to operate west of the Missouri River. At least eighty-seven locomotives were known to have been converted to burn oil at some point in their working spans. While the R-1s received many other varying modifications during their working spans, none of the Stephenson-powered R-1s were rebuilt with Walschaerts valve gear, and only one locomotive with four-bar crosshead guides was ever rebuilt with alligator crosshead guides.

==== Withdrawal ====
The first R-1 to be retired was No. 1132; it was scrapped in 1929, following a 1926 boiler explosion. Most of the other R-1s lasted more than fifty-five years in service. The R-1 locomotives' wide route availabilities resulted in more than 190 of them to remain in active service by 1952. By the time the C&NW discontinued their commercial steam operations in 1956, more than seventy R-1s had been kept in service, before they were all retired. Some R-1s, such as Nos. 1329 and 175, were painted with white trim stripes for use in pulling occasional excursion fantrips throughout the 1950s, prior to their retirement.

Table of pre-1948 scrappings
| Year | Quantity in service at start of year | Quantity scrapped | Numbers | Notes |
|---|---|---|---|---|
| 1929 | 325 | 1 | 1132 | |
| 1936 | 324 | 4 | 476, 1130/61, 1359 | |
| 1937 | 320 | 6 | 184, 360, 1102/11/31/67 | |
| 1938 | 314 | 1 | 893 | |
| 1939 | 313 | 12 | 168, 382, 425/49/83, 1077, 1110/12/16/63, 1229, 1395 | |
| 1940 | 301 | 26 | 245, 375/80, 417/23/51/71/91, 960, 1120/36/38/45/64/66, 1336/45/47–49/57/69/75/93/99, 1421 | |
| 1941 | 275 | 7 | 185, 424, 896, 1219, 1334/64/67 | |
| 1942 | 268 | 1 | 1392 | |
| 1943 | 267 | 3 | 1137, 1382, 1420 | |
| 1944 | 264 | 19 | 418/47/80, 1041/42/74, 1104/14/39/41/43, 1328/35/61/63/65/97, 1411/24 | |
| 1945 | 245 | 7 | 182, 921, 1126, 1339/51/70, 1416 | |
| 1946 | 238 | 7 | 290, 452/66, 915, 1106/47, 1405 | |
| 1947 | 231 | 18 | 44, 61, 122, 295, 343, 484/85, 596, 1070/76/78, 1105/50, 1327/33/55/88/91 | |
| 1948 | 213 | 1 | 1406 | First half-year only |

== Preservation ==
Out of the 325 R-1 locomotives that were built, only three have been preserved. Two of the R-1s, Nos. 175 and 1385, are currently undergoing restoration to operating condition, whereas one, No. 444, remains on static display.

C&NW 175 was built by ALCO in December 1908, being one of the last locomotives of the R-1 class to be built. It was assigned to pull commuter trains within the Wisconsin Division. In September 1957, No. 175 was used to pull an excursion fantrip before it was retired. The locomotive was left in storage in Winona, Minnesota, until December 1960, when it was sold to a private owner. It was subsequently moved to Hancock, Michigan, where it was left in storage for several decades. In 2017, the Steam Railroading Institute (SRI) of Owosso, Michigan acquired No. 175 with the intention of returning the R-1 to active service alongside Pere Marquette 1225. The SRI launched a fundraising campaign to rebuild and replace parts of the locomotive, with a large portion of the funding being administered by the Michigan Department of Transportation (MDOT). No. 175 is the only remaining C&NW steam locomotive to be equipped with Walschaerts valve gear.

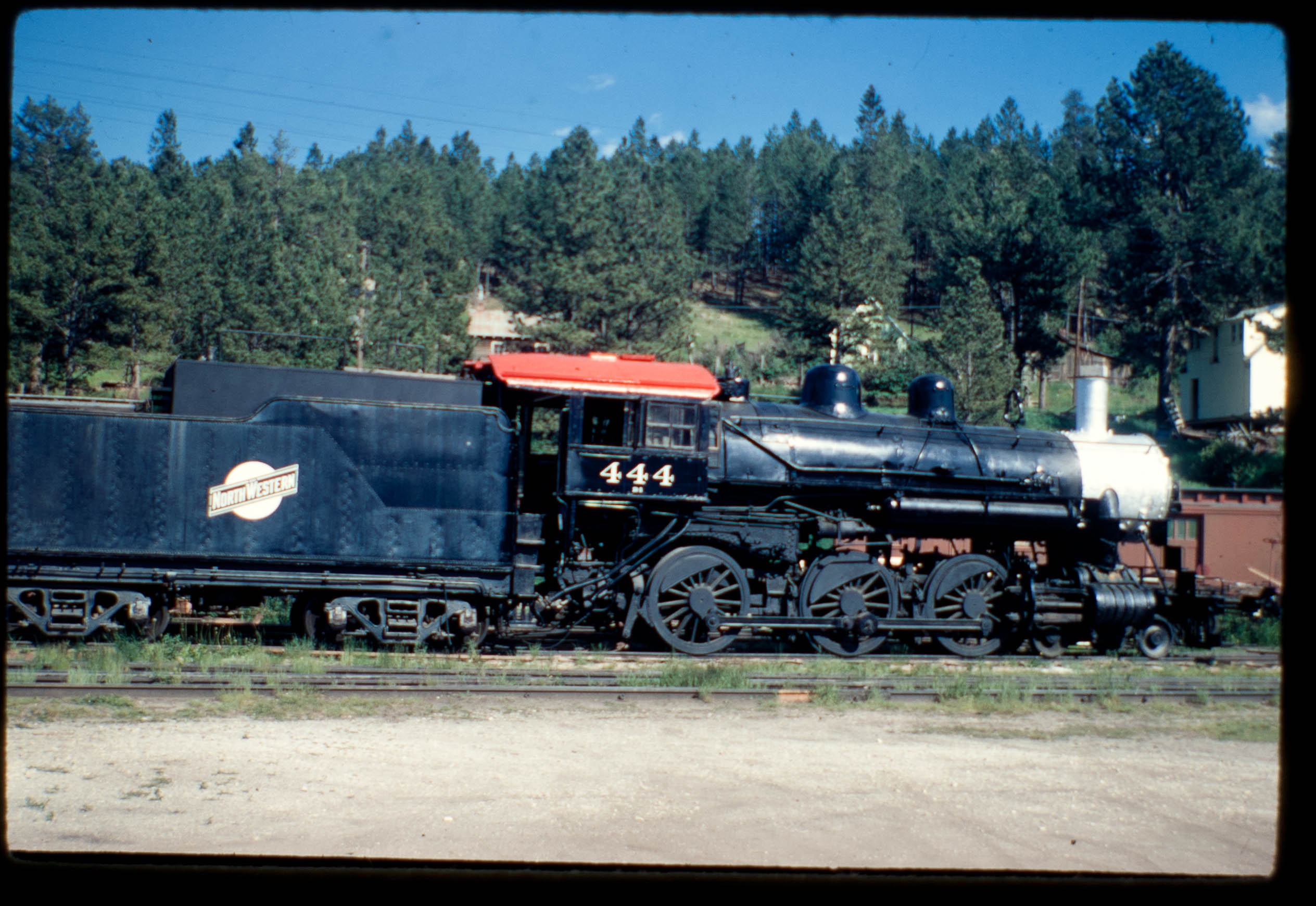
C&NW No. 444 when it was displayed at the Black Hills Central Railroad

C&NW 444 was built in 1906, and it was converted to burn oil in 1925. It last served the C&NW as a switcher in Belle Fourche, before it was retired in 1956. It was left in storage inside a roundhouse in Chadron, Nebraska, until June 1958, when it was acquired by William B. Heckman, the owner of the Black Hills Central Railroad. Crews from the C&NW and the Chicago, Burlington and Quincy Railroad (CB&Q) worked to move No. 444 under its own power from Chadron to the Black Hills Central's location in Hill City, South Dakota. In Hill City, South Dakota Governor Joe Foss performed a Golden Spike ceremony, in commemoration of the locomotive's arrival. It was moved to a siding near the end of the Black Hills Central's line for display. In 1968, No. 444 was purchased by the Forney Transportation Museum, and the locomotive was towed to their location in Denver, Colorado, where it is currently being displayed. No. 444 is the only remaining oil-burning C&NW steam locomotive.

C&NW 1385 was built by ALCO in March 1907, and it was delivered to the C&NW on March 30. It last served the railroad as a switcher in Iron Mountain, Michigan, before it was retired in the summer of 1956. No. 1385 was subsequently used by the C&NW as a stationary boiler to thaw frozen iron ore until November 1961, when the locomotive was purchased by the early members of the Mid-Continent Railway Museum (MCRY). The locomotive was later restored to operating condition, and it was used to pull the MCRY's tourist trains between North Freedom and a disused quartzite quarry, Wisconsin. In the 1980s, the C&NW leased No. 1385 for use in pulling mainline excursion trains for the railroad's steam excursion program, but the program ended following a 1986 insurance crisis. The MCRY subsequently used the R-1 to pull their own mainline excursion trains on other railroads, such as the Wisconsin and Calumet (WICT), and it continued to pull the museum's tourist trains until 1998, when the condition of its boiler reached a point of no return. In 2011, the MCRY initiated a complete rebuild on No. 1385, using grants from the Wagner Foundation. SPEC Machine of Middleton, Wisconsin was hired to perform most of the repairs on the locomotive.

== Omaha Road I-1 and K-1 classes ==
Between 1901 and 1910, the Chicago, St. Paul, Minneapolis and Omaha Railway (CMO) ordered a fleet of sixty-nine I-1 class 4-6-0 locomotives, and they were identical in design to the C&NW's R-1s. When the I-1s were first built, the CMO had to upgrade their rail infrastructure, in order to accommodate the locomotives' larger size and weight. The first thirty-five I-1s were initially fitted with clerestory-type roofs on their cabs—a standard practice that was exclusive to all CMO locomotives up to 1905. While the clerestory-type roofs provided better ventilation than a conventional roof, they proved to be more difficult to maintain, so all I-1s had their clerestory-type roofs removed by 1916. The early I-1s were also equipped with tender truck suspensions that were different from those on the R-1s and the later I-1s.

The I-1s built between 1901 and 1905 were also equipped with four-bar crosshead guides, while the I-1s built after 1905 were built with alligator crosshead guides. The I-1 locomotives that were built throughout 1909 and 1910 were equipped with Walchaerts valve gear. At the same time, the American railroad industry perfected superheated boiler designs on steam locomotives, so the CMO ordered a fleet of superheated 4-6-0s that shared basic dimensions with the Walschaerts-powered I-1s, and they were delivered from ALCO between 1911 and 1913, being classified as the K-1s. Twenty-seven K-1s were built, bringing the CMO I-1/K-1 fleet total to ninety-six.

Table of orders and numbers
| Year | Quantity | Manufacturer | Serial numbers | CMO numbers | Notes |
|---|---|---|---|---|---|
| 1901 | 3 | Schenectady | 5834–5836 | 302-304 | I-1's |
| 1902 | 10 | Alco | 25417–25426 | 308-317 | I-1's |
| 1903 | 15 | Alco | 27551–27565 | 318–332 | I-1's |
| 1905 | 3 | Alco | 30468–30470 | 333–335 | I-1's |
| 1906 | 10 | Alco | 39400–39409 | 336–345 | I-1's |
| 1907 | 10 | Alco | 42622-42631 | 346–355 | I-1's |
| 1909 | 5 | Alco | 45915–45919 | 356-360 | I-1's |
| 1910 | 7 | Alco | 47040–47046 | 361–363, 222-225 | I-1's |
| 1910 | 6 | Alco | 48948–48953 | 101–106 | I-1's |
| 1911 | 5 | Alco | 50126–50131 | 107–108, 112, 231-232 | K-1's |
| 1912 | 12 | Alco | 50947–50956 | 235-246 | K-1's |
| 1913 | 10 | Alco | 52621–52630 | 110, 125, 183–184, 201, 203–204, 249, 261-262 | K-1's |

Most of the I-1s and K-1s were assigned to way-freight and yard-switching services during their working spans. For switching purposes, the locomotives' original wooden pilots were replaced with CMO-designed switcher pilots, beginning in 1933. All of the CMO I-1s and K-1s were withdrawn from service and then scrapped by the end of the 1950s with none of them surviving into preservation.

== Accidents ==
- December 17, 1926 — R-1 No. 1132 was switching tanker cars of oil at the C&NW's yard in Glenrock, Wyoming, with the sole crew member being 30-year-old engineer Roland G. Cross, following a 3:00 a.m. crew change. At 5:20 a.m., the locomotive's boiler exploded, and it hurled around 300 feet (91 m) above the running gear. Cross was thrown some feet from the explosion, he sustained a broken neck and a broken leg, and he was instantly killed. The explosion also shattered the glass windows of a C&NW station 50 feet (15 m) away, and the station's telegraph operator, A. J. Mashek, quickly reported the accident. A subsequent investigation determined that the explosion was caused by an inefficient water level in the crown sheet, and No. 1132 was later scrapped in January 1929.
- October 8, 1947 — An unknown oil-burning R-1 was operating in work train service in Lake Preston, South Dakota, with the sole crew member being 24-year-old engineer Robert Cavanaugh. At 12:15 a.m., the R-1's boiler exploded, tore away from the smokebox and frame, hurled around 100 feet (30 m) above the running gear, and then bounced twice before landing around 200 feet (61 m) in front of the running gear. The explosion critically damaged the surrounding yard trackage, along with two cabooses and portions of a nearby fence. Cavanaugh was thrown 75 feet (23 m) from the impact, and he died from his injuries at 2:37 a.m., after local residents brought him to a Huron, South Dakota hospital.

== See also ==
- Chicago and North Western E-2 Class
- Chicago and North Western E-4 Class
- Norfolk and Western Railway class M
