= Flambeau 400 =

Flambeau Flambeau 400
- A C&NW EMD F-7(A) number 4087-A, and its train of five Bi-Level, gallery cars, are at the Green Bay C&NW station in August 1969.

Overview
- Service type: Inter-city rail
- Status: Discontinued
- Locale: Illinois, Wisconsin, Michigan
- First service: Flambeau: June 21, 1935; Flambeau 400: May 26, 1950
- Last service: May 1, 1971
- Former operator(s): Chicago and North Western Railway

Route
- Termini: North Western Terminal; Chicago, Illinois: Union Depot, Ashland, Wisconsin, CNW Depot, Ironwood, Michigan, and; Watersmeet, Michigan
- Distance travelled: 452 miles (727 km)
- Train number(s): 153, 216

Technical
- Track gauge: 4 ft 8 1/2 in (1,435 mm) standard gauge
- Operating speed: Max 90 mph, between Chicago and Green Bay, average speed 50 mph

The Flambeau 400 was a streamlined passenger train operated by the Chicago and North Western Railway between Chicago, Illinois, and Ashland, Wisconsin on Lake Superior, via Green Bay, Wisconsin. It was originally a special service in the summer time.

== History ==
Beginning in 1935, the Flambeau transported the new American middle class to its new leisure time in the North Woods of Wisconsin. The Flambeau operated over basically the same route as later trains did except for bypassing Green Bay to run via Hortonville and Eland. By 1937 the route changed to operate via Green Bay. In July 1949 the Flambeau was integrated with the Shoreland 400 and the Valley 400, running as one train between Chicago and Green Bay and as separate trains beyond Green Bay. Northbound trains ran via Fond du Lac and southbound trains via Manitowoc.

In 1950 the train received a new name, Flambeau 400, in reference to the C&NW's popular Twin Cities 400, named for making the approximately 400 mile run from Chicago to Minneapolis, Minnesota in 400 minutes, and Flambeau, the French word for a torch. In 1958 the Flambeau 400 and Peninsula 400 received bilevel equipment. Serving the north woods of Wisconsin, it saw heavy tourist traffic, but by May 1968, it was losing thousands of dollars for the North Western. In 1969 the Flambeau became an unnamed Chicago-Green Bay train with seasonal service to Ashland.

The last Flambeau 400 rolled out of the North Woods on January 5, 1971. Amtrak did not include Green Bay and Ashland in its initial route structure.

== Equipment ==
The consist varied over the years and by seasonal demand. The number of cars varied between ten and two. Trains may have had a coach-lounge instead of a diner, and some trains had neither. The train used heavyweight 56-seat single level coaches until the arrival of new gallery cars in 1958. The otherwise bi-level train featured a single-level dining car (which operated Chicago-Green Bay) with a false roof to match the gallery cars. The motive power in the early years by class R-1 Ten-wheelers on the Watersmeet branch, and class E-2-a Pacifics everywhere else. By the later 40s or early 50s E8s and F7s took over. Two units usually ran as far as Green Bay, where one would lay over with the dining car for the return trip.
