= Minnesota 400 =

Train service in United States of America

Minnesota 400 Dakota 400 Rochester 400
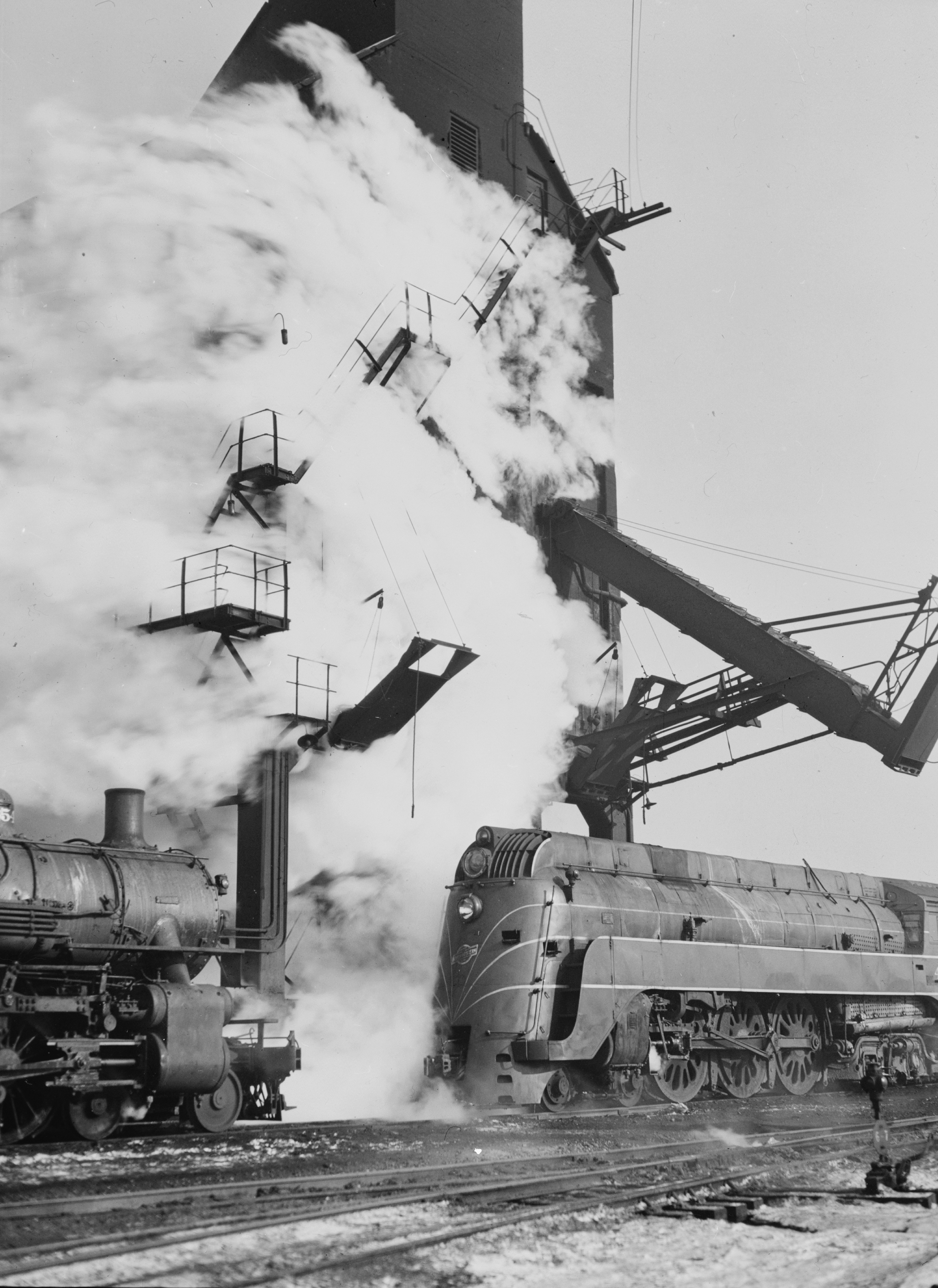
- A streamlined C&NW class E-4 Hudson steam locomotive appears in Chicago in 1942 (right). Class ES Pacific engines used for the Minnesota 400 had almost identical shrouding.

Overview
- Service type: Inter-city rail
- Status: Discontinued
- Locale: Mid-West
- First service: June 14, 1936
- Last service: July 23, 1963
- Former operator(s): Chicago and North Western Railway

Route
- Termini: Chicago, Illinois; Rapid City, South Dakota
- Service frequency: Daily
- Train number(s): 418 (eastbound); 419 (westbound)

On-board services
- Seating arrangements: Coaches (1956)
- Sleeping arrangements: Open sections and double bedrooms
- Catering facilities: Dining car, tap lounge car
- Observation facilities: Lounge car, parlor car

The Minnesota 400 was a streamlined passenger train operated by the Chicago and North Western Railway on its southern Minnesota line between Mankato, Minnesota and Wyeville, Wisconsin. It began running in 1936. In 1950 it was extended to run between Chicago, Illinois and Huron, South Dakota and renamed the Dakota 400. It would be further extended to Rapid City, South Dakota, before being cut back to Mankato, in 1960. This final iteration was named the Rochester 400 and it ceased operation in 1963.

== History ==
The Minnesota 400 began service in a similar way to the original Twin Cities to Chicago 400, with heavyweight passenger cars pulled by an ordinary, non-streamlined steam locomotive. These were originally C&NW class D 4-4-2 Atlantics, already more than 30 years old. In 1938, more passenger cars were added to the trains, so the locomotives were replaced by class E-S 4-6-2 Pacifics, with streamlined shrouds. These were still about 25 years old, but were better able to handle the heavier load. The train still primarily ran with heavyweight passenger cars until after World War II, finally receiving a full consist of streamlined cars in 1946. It was still another four years before the first EMD E8 diesel locomotives began pulling the train in 1950. At that time, the service was expanded to South Dakota and renamed the Dakota 400.

As the line served Rochester and its famous Mayo Clinic, there was at least one car on each train with wider doors for allowing patients on stretchers and other accommodations. By the end of rail service in the 1960s, Mayo stated that 25 to 30 percent of their out-of-town patients still came by train.

Much of the track used in Wisconsin has now been abandoned. The line in Minnesota and South Dakota is now owned by the Dakota, Minnesota and Eastern Railroad (Canadian Pacific subsidiary), while parts near Chicago are now owned by the Union Pacific Railroad. The Dakota, Minnesota and Eastern railroad was purchased by Canadian Pacific and the last D M & E train traveled in 2008.

== Route ==
The original Minnesota 400 operated between Mankato, Minnesota and Wyeville, Wisconsin. At Wyeville passengers transferred to the Twin Cities 400 for connections to Chicago. Heretofore that train had not stopped in Wyeville. On August 8, 1937, the C&NW extended the Minnesota 400 south to Chicago via Madison and Janesville, Wisconsin. The southbound train bypassed Wyeville on the Elroy-Sparta cutoff; Milwaukee passengers connected at Madison. This experiment proved short-lived: the train reverted to its original route through Milwaukee on June 26, 1938.

The Dakota 400 followed much the same route to Chicago, save that it was rerouted westward back to the route through Beloit, Wisconsin Janesville and Madison. Its original western terminus was Huron, South Dakota. North of Elroy, the northbound train took the Elroy-Sparta cutoff while the southbound train stopped at Wyeville. Through coach service to Rapid City, South Dakota began on April 27, 1952; this service began carrying the "Dakota 400" name in October 1955, effectively extending the train to Rapid City.

The Rochester 400 operated between Mankato and Chicago; east of Mankato its routing was unchanged from the Dakota 400.

=== Principal stops ===
In late 1951, these were the principal stops on the Dakota 400:

- Chicago (Chicago & North Western Terminal)
- Janesville
- Madison (Chicago & North Western Station)
- Elroy
- Sparta
- Winona, Minnesota
- Rochester
- Mankato
- Brookings, South Dakota
- Huron (At Huron, the sleeping car would be carried directly onto the connecting #515 from Huron to Rapid City; eastbound, the connecting #534 performed the same function from Rapid City to Huron.)
- Pierre
- Rapid City
