= Chicago and North Western E-4 class =

Class of 9 American 1937 ALCO built CNW Streamlined 4-6-4 Hudson Steam locomotives

C&NW class E-4
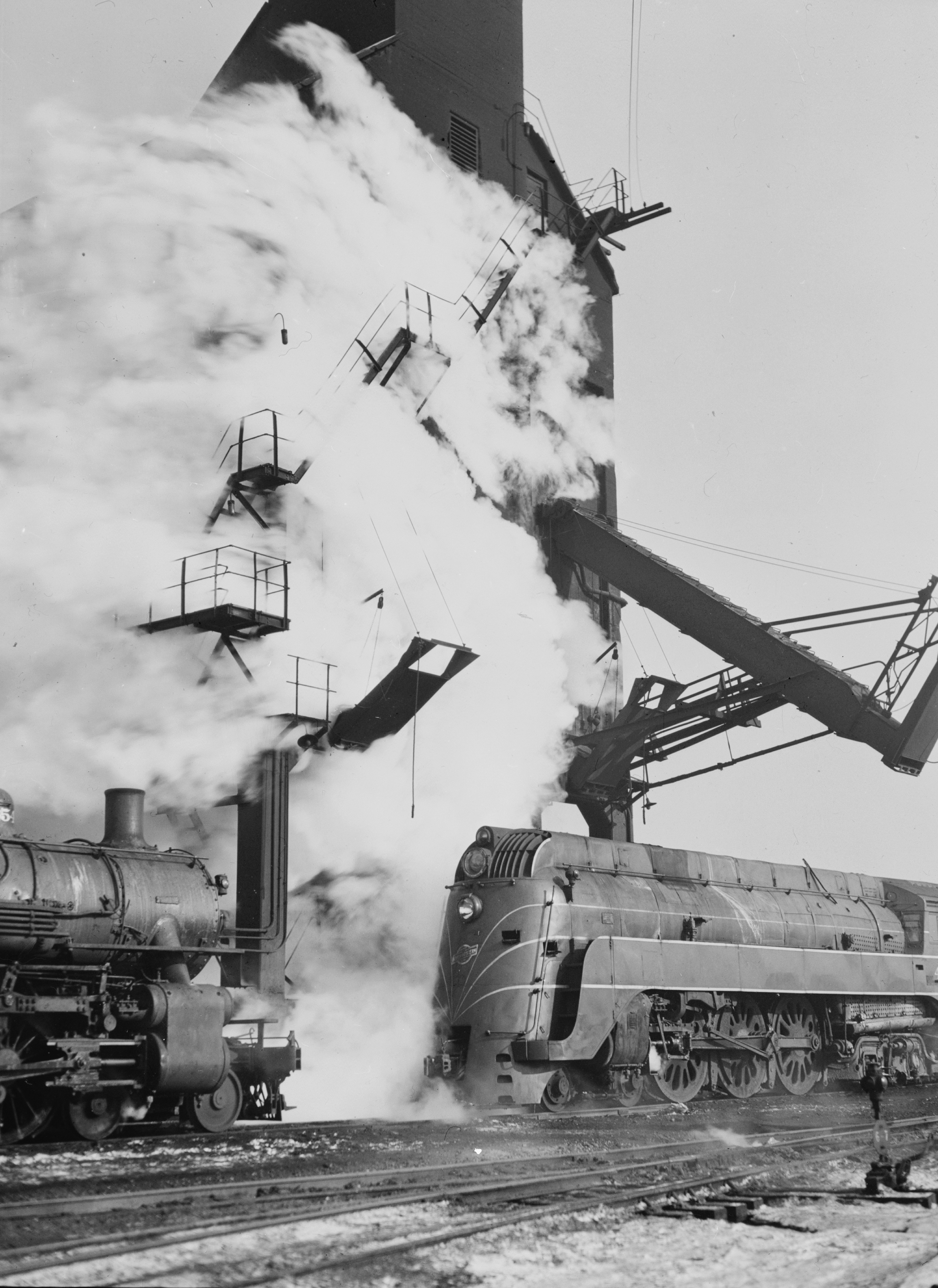
- A C&NW E-4 waiting to be refueled at a Chicago-area coaling station in December 1942
Type and origin
- Power type: Steam
- Builder: American Locomotive Company
- Serial number: 68982–68989, 69028
- Build date: 1937
- Total produced: 9
Specifications
- Configuration
  - Whyte: 4-6-4
  - UIC: 2′C2′ h2
- Gauge: 4 ft 8 1/2 in (1,435 mm) standard gauge
- Driver dia.: 84 in (2,134 mm)
- Length: 101 ft 9 3/4 in (31.03 m)
- Height: 15 ft 11 21/32 in (4.87 m)
- Adhesive weight: 216,000 lb (98,000 kilograms; 98 metric tons)
- Loco weight: 412,000 lb (187,000 kilograms; 187 metric tons)
- Total weight: 791,500 lb (359,000 kilograms; 359.0 metric tons)
- Fuel type: Coal, later converted to burn Oil in 1946-1947
- Fuel capacity: 50,000 lb (23 metric tons), later 6,000 US gal (23,000 L; 5,000 imp gal)
- Water cap.: 20,000 US gal (76,000 L; 17,000 imp gal)
- Firebox
  - Grate area: 90.7 sq ft (8.43 m^{2})
- Boiler pressure: 300 lbf/in^{2} (2.07 MPa)
- Heating surface: 3,958 sq ft (367.7 m^{2})
- Superheater
  - Heating area: 1,884 sq ft (175.0 m^{2})
- Cylinders: Two
- Cylinder size: 25 in × 29 in (635 mm × 737 mm)
Performance figures
- Tractive effort: 55,022 lbf (244.75 kN)
Career
- Operators: Chicago and North Western Railroad
- Numbers: 4001–4009
- Retired: 1953–1956
- Scrapped: 1953–1961
- Disposition: All scrapped

The Chicago and North Western Class E-4 was a class of nine streamlined 4-6-4 "Hudson" steam locomotives built in 1937 by the American Locomotive Company (ALCO).

The nine E-4's were almost identical in specification and purpose to the Milwaukee Road's six class F7 locomotives, and they were built by the same builder at the same time, yet their streamlined designs were different. The E-4's were built to haul the Chicago and North Western's (C&NW) famous "400" express passenger trains, but before they were even delivered, the railroad's management decided that streamlined steam was the wrong direction and instead placed orders with General Motors Electro-Motive Division for new diesel locomotives.

The displaced E-4s instead pulled secondary passenger trains, until they were withdrawn from service between 1953 and 1956, and scrapping commenced on the fleet. Two remaining E-4's (Nos. 4008 and 4009) were kept in Escanaba, Michigan to thaw frozen ore with heat from their boilers. In August 1961, Nos. 4008 and 4009 were replaced by a new infrared process, and since both E-4's had been welded to the rails, C&NW crews had to scrap them on site.

== Other C&NW steam locomotives ==
- Chicago and North Western D Class 4-4-2 – A major workhorse of the C&NW, some were used on the Minnesota 400.
- Chicago and North Western E Class 4-6-2 – Some converted to "ES" class with similar casing to the E-4. The ES engines succeeded Class D locomotives on the Minnesota 400.
- Chicago and North Western E-2 Class 4-6-2 – Twelve locomotives, four of which were converted to "E-2-a" class and were the original locomotives for the Twin Cities to Chicago 400 before being replaced by EMD E3 diesel units. The remaining eight were converted to "E-2-b" locomotives.
