= Wyeville, Wisconsin =

- Village
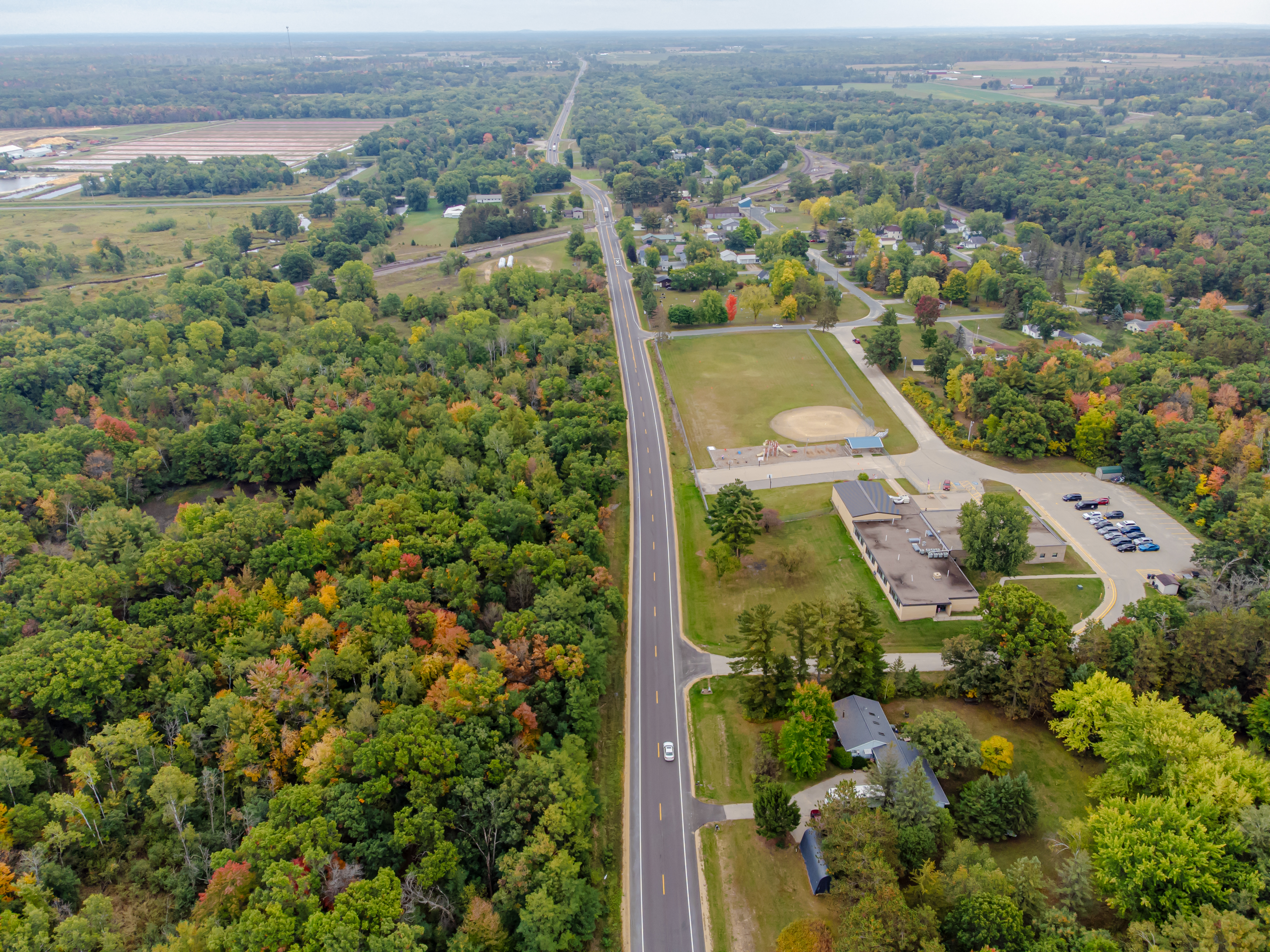

- Location of Wyeville in Monroe County, Wisconsin.
- Coordinates: 44°1′40″N 90°23′9″W
- Country: United States
- State: Wisconsin
- County: Monroe

Area
  - Total: 0.56 sq mi (1.46 km^{2})
  - Land: 0.56 sq mi (1.46 km^{2})
  - Water: 0 sq mi (0.00 km^{2})
- Elevation: 920 ft (280 m)

Population (2020)
  - Total: 121
  - Density: 215/sq mi (82.9/km^{2})
- Time zone: UTC-6 (Central (CST))
  - Summer (DST): UTC-5 (CDT)
- Area code: 608
- FIPS code: 55-89275
- GNIS feature ID: 1577062

Wyeville is a village in Monroe County, Wisconsin, United States. It is located on Wisconsin Highway 21. The population was 121 at the 2020 census.

== History ==
The West Wisconsin Railway was authorized in 1876 to build from St. Paul, Minnesota through to reach the Chicago and North Western Railway at Elroy, Wisconsin. This railroad became the Chicago, St. Paul, Minneapolis and Omaha Railway ("The Omaha Road") in 1880. At this location, a branch rail line was constructed eastward to Necedah. The location originally was named "Necedah Junction". The local post office was called Wyeville when established in 1890 and the first postmaster was Charles Brooks. The name Wyeville is documented as a variation of "Wythe", a county in Virginia. Eventually the name "Necedah Junction" was dropped in 1911 and the community was called the same name as the post office.

The railway junction became a crossing in 1911 for the lines of the Chicago and North Western Railway and its Omaha Road subsidiary. The Milwaukee, Sparta, and Northwestern Railroad, a subsidiary of the Chicago and North Western Railway, began the "Air Line" or "Adams Cutoff" from Adams, Wisconsin towards Sparta, Wisconsin in 1910. This railroad used the line from Necedah to Wyeville as part of this new route. A true railroad wye was built at the railroad crossover, along with an interlocking tower and railroad depot.

Until 1963, passengers of Twin Cities 400 and the Rochester 400 changed trains there, as it was a scheduled transfer point for the two streamliners.

== Geography ==
According to the United States Census Bureau, the village has a total area of 0.59 square miles (1.53 km^{2}), all land.

== Demographics ==
Historical population
Census	Pop.	Note	%±
1930	140		—
1940	219		56.4%
1950	195		−11.0%
1960	220		12.8%
1970	203		−7.7%
1980	163		−19.7%
1990	154		−5.5%
2000	146		−5.2%
2010	147		0.7%
2020	121		−17.7%
U.S. Decennial Census

=== 2010 census ===
As of the census of 2010, there were 147 people, 62 households, and 38 families living in the village. The population density was 249.2 inhabitants per square mile (96.2/km^{2}). There were 70 housing units at an average density of 118.6 per square mile (45.8/km^{2}). The racial makeup of the village was 95.9% White, 1.4% Native American, 0.7% from other races, and 2.0% from two or more races. Hispanic or Latino of any race were 1.4% of the population.

There were 62 households, of which 25.8% had children under the age of 18 living with them, 50.0% were married couples living together, 6.5% had a female householder with no husband present, 4.8% had a male householder with no wife present, and 38.7% were non-families. 22.6% of all households were made up of individuals, and 8.1% had someone living alone who was 65 years of age or older. The average household size was 2.37 and the average family size was 2.79.

The median age in the village was 43.5 years. 21.1% of residents were under the age of 18; 8.1% were between the ages of 18 and 24; 25.8% were from 25 to 44; 28.5% were from 45 to 64; and 16.3% were 65 years of age or older. The gender makeup of the village was 53.7% male and 46.3% female.

=== 2000 census ===
As of the census of 2000, there were 146 people, 56 households, and 39 families living in the village. The population density was 245.7 people per square mile (95.5/km^{2}). There were 60 housing units at an average density of 101.0 per square mile (39.3/km^{2}). The racial makeup of the village was 93.84% White, 3.42% Native American, 2.74% from other races. Hispanic or Latino of any race were 2.74% of the population.

There were 56 households, out of which 30.4% had children under the age of 18 living with them, 57.1% were married couples living together, 7.1% had a female householder with no husband present, and 28.6% were non-families. 25.0% of all households were made up of individuals, and 19.6% had someone living alone who was 65 years of age or older. The average household size was 2.61 and the average family size was 3.15.

In the village, the population was spread out, with 29.5% under the age of 18, 6.2% from 18 to 24, 30.8% from 25 to 44, 21.9% from 45 to 64, and 11.6% who were 65 years of age or older. The median age was 37 years. For every 100 females, there were 105.6 males. For every 100 females age 18 and over, there were 87.3 males.

The median income for a household in the village was $38,750, and the median income for a family was $44,531. Males had a median income of $33,750 versus $27,813 for females. The per capita income for the village was $14,344. There were 9.8% of families and 13.1% of the population living below the poverty line, including 25.5% of under eighteens and 9.5% of those over 64.

== Gallery ==
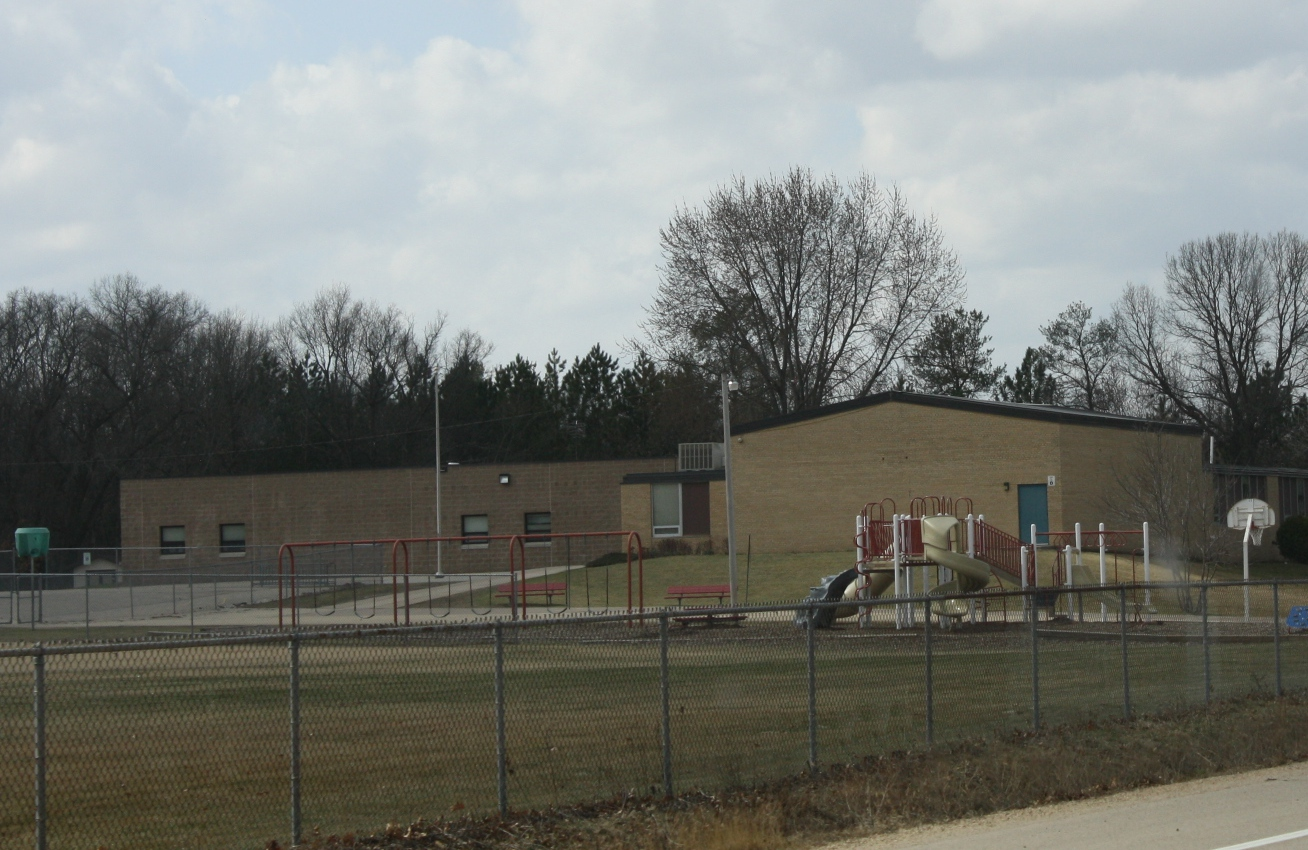
Wyeville Wisconsin Elementary School

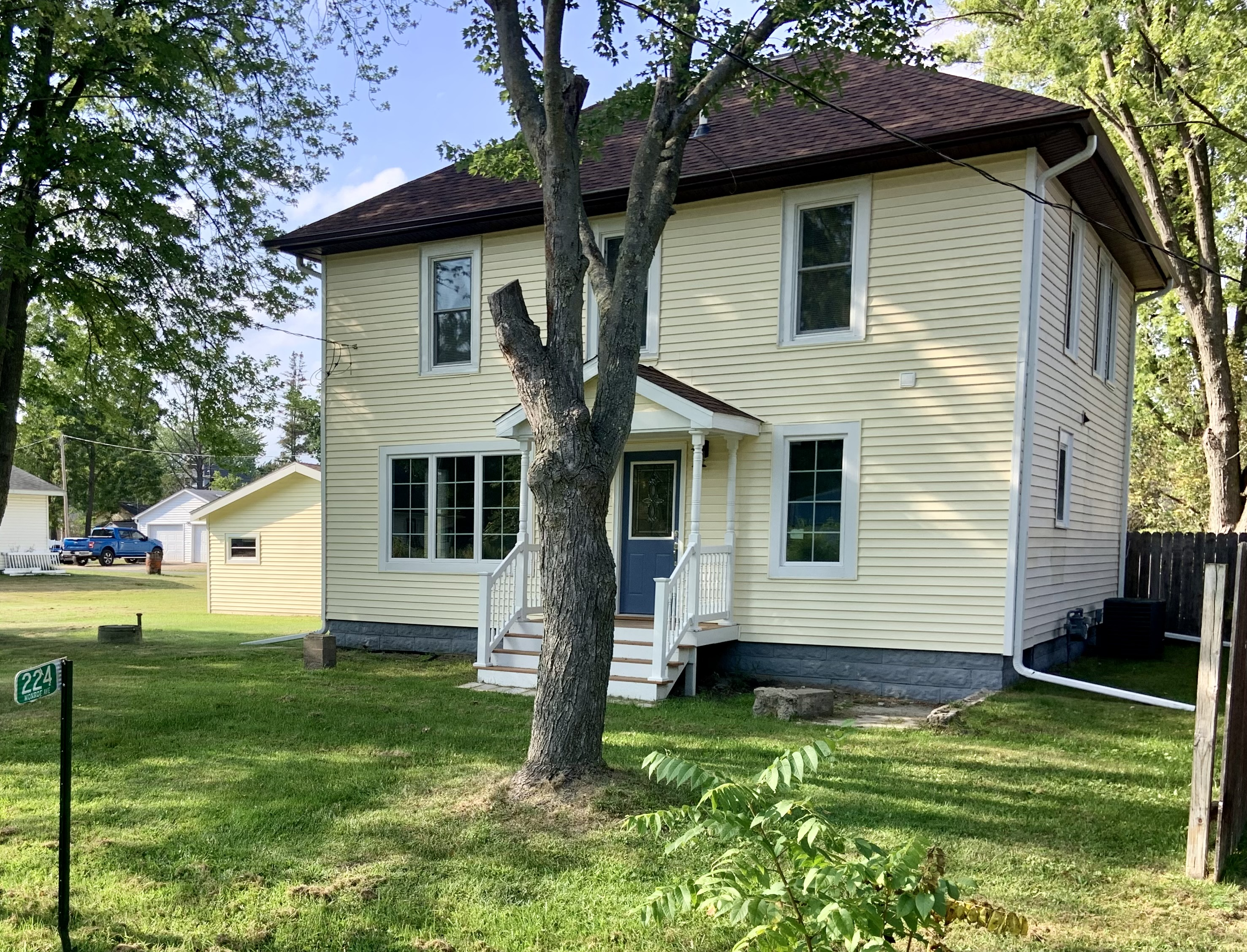
Village hall at a house

== Notable people ==
- Kyle Kenyon, lawyer and legislator
