= Chicago and North Western Z class =

Class of 251 American 2-8-0 locomotives

C&NW class Z Omaha Road class Z
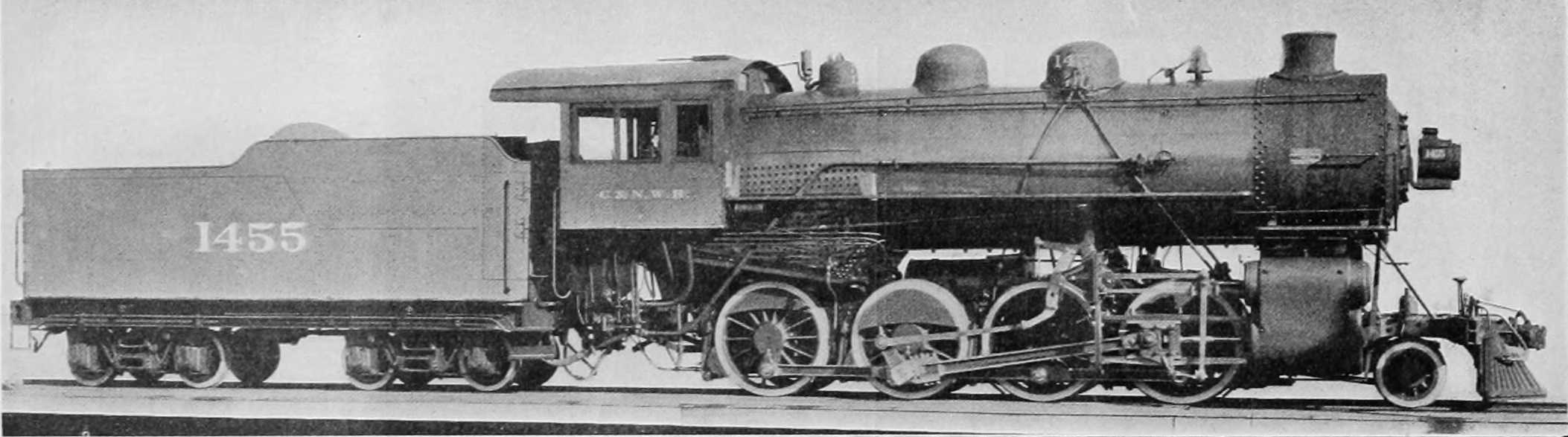
- C&NW 1455, the first of the class Z (Alco 46607 of 1909)
Type and origin
- Power type: Steam
- Builder: American Locomotive Company (226); Baldwin Locomotive Works (25)
- Serial number: see table
- Build date: 1909–1913
- Total produced: 251
Specifications
- Configuration
  - Whyte: 2-8-0
  - UIC: 1′D n2, later 1′D h2
- Gauge: 4 ft 8 1/2 in (1,435 mm)
- Driver dia.: 61 in (1.549 m)
- Wheelbase: 36 ft 5 in (11 m)
- Loco weight: 235,000–243,500 pounds (106,600–110,400 kg)
- Firebox
  - Grate area: 52.68 sq ft (4.894 m^{2}) (108 in × 70 1/4 in or 2.743 m × 1.784 m)
- Boiler
  - Diameter: 81 1/2 in (2.070 m)
- Boiler pressure: 170 lbf/in^{2} (1.17 MPa)
- Cylinders: Two, outside
- Cylinder size: 25 in × 32 in (635 mm × 813 mm)
- Valve gear: Walschaerts or Baker
- Valve type: 14 in (360 mm) piston valves
- Valve travel: 6 in (150 mm)
Performance figures
- Tractive effort: 47,500 lbf (211.29 kN)
Career
- Operators: Chicago and North Western Railway; Omaha Road
- Number in class: CNW: 249; CMO: 2
- Numbers: CNW: 1455–1494, 1700–1910; CMO: 219–220
- Disposition: All scrapped

The Chicago and North Western Railway class Z (and Omaha Road class Z) was a class of 251 American 2-8-0 locomotives. They were built between 1909 and 1913, when production switched to the larger class J 2-8-2 locomotives. The class letter spawned their nickname amongst C&NW and Omaha Road crews: "Zulu".

== Design ==
The locomotives has boiler pressed to 170 pounds per square inch (1.2 MPa) feeding steam to two cylinders that had a 25-inch (640 mm) bore and a 32-inch (810 mm) stroke. These were connected to 61-inch (1,500 mm) driving wheels buy Walschaerts valve gear, although the last 47 were built with Baker valve gear. They had 14-inch (360 mm) piston valves with 6 inches (150 mm) travel. The firebox was of the radial-stay pattern, 108 inches (2,700 mm) deep by 70 1/4 inches (1,780 mm) wide. The resulting 52.68 square feet (4.894 m^{2}) was 14 per cent larger than the class R-1.

== Construction ==
Apart from a batch of 25 built by the Baldwin Locomotive Works, all the locomotives were built by the American Locomotive Company at their Schenectady plant. Baldwin classified their locomotives as 10-48-E

Table of orders and numbers
Year	Quantity	Manufacturer	Serial numbers	C&NW numbers	Notes
1909	40	Alco	46607–635/637/636/638–646	1455–1494	
1910	25	Baldwin	34991, 35015–022/060–065/101–106/144–145/223–224	1700–1724	
1910	26	Alco	47845–47870	1725–1750	
1910	27	Alco	49035–49061	1751–1777	
1911	23	Alco	49062–49084	1778–1800	
1911	20	Alco	50494–50513	1801–1820	
1912	45	Alco	50849–50893	1821–1865	
1913	45	Alco	53047–53091	1866–1910	
1913	2	Alco	53092–53093	219–220	Omaha Road

== Service ==
On the C&NW, they were used system-wide on freight trains, and were the principle freight-hauling locomotive on the railway until the arrival of the class J Mikados. The extra power over the existing freight locomotives enabled running 75-car trains; unfortunately, older wooden-framed freight cars could not stand the punishment and a large number of "bad-ordered" cars required repairs. The Omaha Road used its pair, like all its 2-8-0s, in switching, transfer and helper service. They had in fact been delivered a week after the Omaha Road's first class J 2-8-2 locomotives.

When new all had been built as hand-fired coal-burning locomotives. The large grates were tricky to fire and several firemen resigned as a result. At least 17 were fitted-up for oil-firing for use in Wyoming, where fuel oil was readily available. Twelve others received mechanical stokers during World War II.

In 1942, several locomotives were leased out to other operators; by war's end, these had either been purchased or returned. Sales included five to American Smelting and Refining Company (ASRCo), five to the Seaboard Air Line Railroad (SAL), two to the St. Louis Southwestern Railway (Cotton Belt or SSW), 25 to the Ferrocarriles Nacionales de México (NdeM) directly, and another seven via a dealer. They also later acquired ASRCo's five.

The first retirement was in 1936; fifty were still in service in mid-1948. The Omaha Road retired both of its Zulus in June 1956.

Table of pre-1948 scrappings
Year	Quantity in service at start of year	Quantity scrapped	Numbers	Notes
1936	251	1	1750	
1937	250	5	1719/30/51/86, 1827	
1938	245	4	1488, 1721, 1893, 1908	
1939	241	2	1481, 1720	
1940	239	42	1462/74/76/82, 1704/08/09/11/14/22/23/26–28/32/40/54/55/65/66/70/72/74/83/91/95, 1808–10/15/21/30/33/47/56/62/65/67/91/92/94, 1903	
1941	197	34	1455/59/60/64/65/70/73, 1700/10/31/36/42/60/63/96/98, 1807/12/17/18/24/29/34/40/44/45/54/61/68/71/78/82/86; 1900	
1942	163	3	1467/94, 1793	scrapped
1942		[5]	1717/24/85, 1837/58	to ASRCo 4000–4004; to NdeM 1582–1586
1942		[7]	1466/68/69/86, 1790, 1848/97	to NdeM 1550/51/55/52/53/54/56 via dealer
1942		[2]	1477, 1725	to Cotton Belt 540–540 (SSW class K-1)
1942		[18]	1458/61/87; 1702/84/89/99; 1820/31/53/60/66/72/74/81/83/88/98	to NdeM 1558–61/69–81/57 (class GR-43)
1943	128	[5]	1744/87, 1806/43/59	to SAL 933–937 (class H-2)
1943		[7]	1729/46/59/64/77/81/82	to NdeM 1562–1568
1944	116	15	1463/72/75/78, 1718/37/43/56/67/97, 1816/25/36/38/84	
1945	101	22	1457/71/85/91/92, 1701/34/38/45/53/68/69/73/92; 1835/42/57/63/76; 1901/04/05	
1946	79	12	1480, 1713/33/47/52/62, 1804/05/77/89/90, 1907	
1947	67	17	1456, 1706/12/41/49/57/58/80, 1819/50/51/64/85/96/99, 906/10	1899 became stationary boiler at Chase Roundhouse, Milwaukee
1948	50	0		first half-year only

No locomotives of this class have been preserved.
