= Viking (train) =

Former passenger train service between Chicago and Saint Paul

The Viking

Overview
- Service type: Limited-stop
- Status: Discontinued
- Locale: Minnesota, Wisconsin, Illinois
- First service: April 29, 1923
- Former operator(s): Chicago, St. Paul, Minneapolis and Omaha Railway (Minneapolis–Elroy); Chicago and North Western Railway (Elroy–Chicago)

Route
- Termini: Great Northern Depot, Minneapolis, Minnesota; North Western Terminal, Chicago, Illinois
- Stops: 20
- Train number(s): 501, 502

Technical
- Track gauge: 4 ft 8 1/2 in (1,435 mm) standard gauge

The Viking was a named train of the Chicago and North Western Railway. It operated between Chicago and Saint Paul, via Madison, Wisconsin, with a final stop in Minneapolis. It debuted Sunday, April 29, 1923. It featured all steel cars, including a dining car, observation car, and coaches. It was a daylight train, scheduled to depart eastbound and westbound in the morning and arrive at the destination in the evening. It made limited station stops between Chicago and St. Paul. The trip took roughly 12 hours.

== History ==
Already by 1928, Popular Science would note that a Northwest Airways flight could reach Chicago in five hours, compared to the 11 hours for the Viking.

The Twin Cities 400 would go on to be the premier train between Chicago and Minneapolis-St. Paul in 1935. The Viking, Victory, and the North Western Limited made stops at more stations than the Twin Cities 400, but not as many as the overnight North Western Mail train, that stopped at every local station.

== Route ==
The train originated at the Chicago and North Western Terminal (now the Ogilvie Transportation Center) on Madison Street in Chicago. It ran to Madison on the Northwestern line out of Chicago via Harvard, Illinois and Evansville, Wisconsin. It ran through Madison, Wisconsin, and onto Elroy, Wisconsin where it followed the Omaha Road route to St. Paul.

It stopped at the Saint Paul Union Depot, and then made the short run to the Minneapolis Great Northern Depot over the Stone Arch Bridge.

== Bibliography ==
- "Chicago and North Western: A Capsule History". Chicago and North Western Historical Society. Archived from the original on May 22, 2016.
- "The Twin Cities 400, First and Most Famous of the North Western's 400s". American-Rails.com.
- Scribbins, Jim (2008) [1982]. The 400 Story. Minneapolis, Minnesota: University of Minnesota Press. ISBN 978-0-8166-5449-9.
