= Peninsula 400 =

Former passenger train service

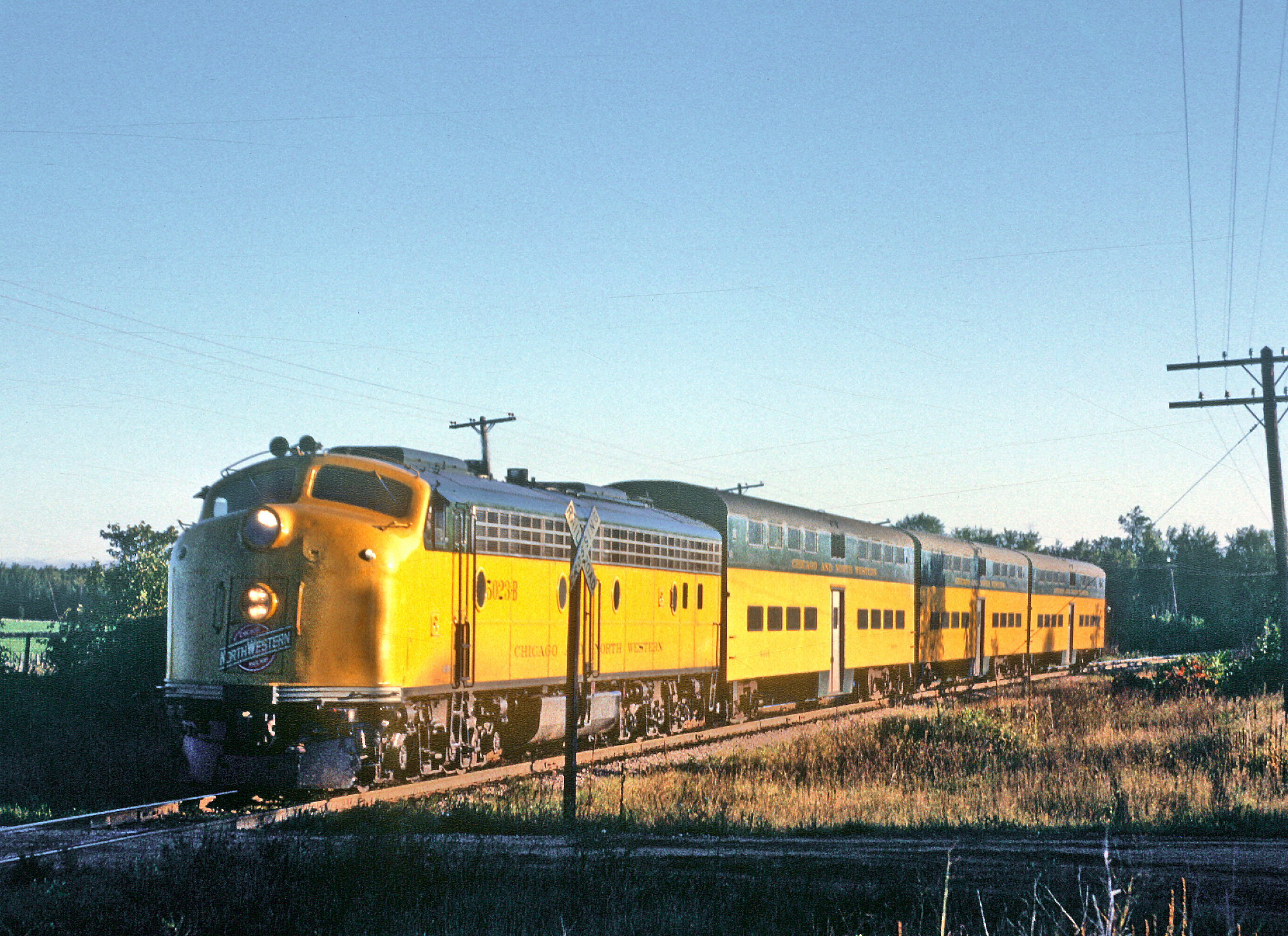
- CNW 5023B (E8A) leading the Peninsula 400 north of Oconto, Wisconsin in September 1964.

Overview
- Status: Discontinued
- Locale: Illinois, Wisconsin, Michigan
- First service: 1942
- Last service: 15 July 1969/30 April 1971
- Former operator: Chicago and North Western Railway

Route
- Termini: Chicago, Illinois; Ishpeming, Michigan
- Distance travelled: 393.3 mi (633 km)
- Service frequency: Daily
- Train numbers: 214, southbound 209, northbound

On-board services
- Seating arrangements: Bi-level coaches
- Catering facilities: Coach-bar-lounge car, tap lounge car, dining car (1964)
- Observation facilities: Parlor car

Technical
- Track gauge: 4 ft 8 1/2 in (1,435 mm) standard gauge

The Peninsula 400 was a daily express passenger train operated by the Chicago and North Western Railway between Chicago and Ishpeming, in Michigan's Upper Peninsula. It operated as a named consist from 1942 to 1969. It was one of the railroad's 400 passenger trains, whose name stemmed from the original '400-mile, 400-minute' express operated by the railroad between Chicago and Minneapolis–St. Paul.

== History ==
Service began in 1942, and the Peninsula 400 quickly became a major hit, drawing more passengers than the far more prestigious Twin Cities 400 and commanding fourteen passenger cars when running south of Green Bay, Wisconsin. The train, numbered as 214–209 (depending on what direction it was going), was often pulled behind the North Western's lone ALCO DL-107 and an EMD E3 or E6. Unlike many of the other 400s, two engines were required due to the train's heavy patronage, which required lengthy consists. In 1943, for instance, the train averaged 662 passengers on its northbound run and 468 when headed back south. In all, the Peninsula 400 carried 674,299 total passengers in under two years of service.

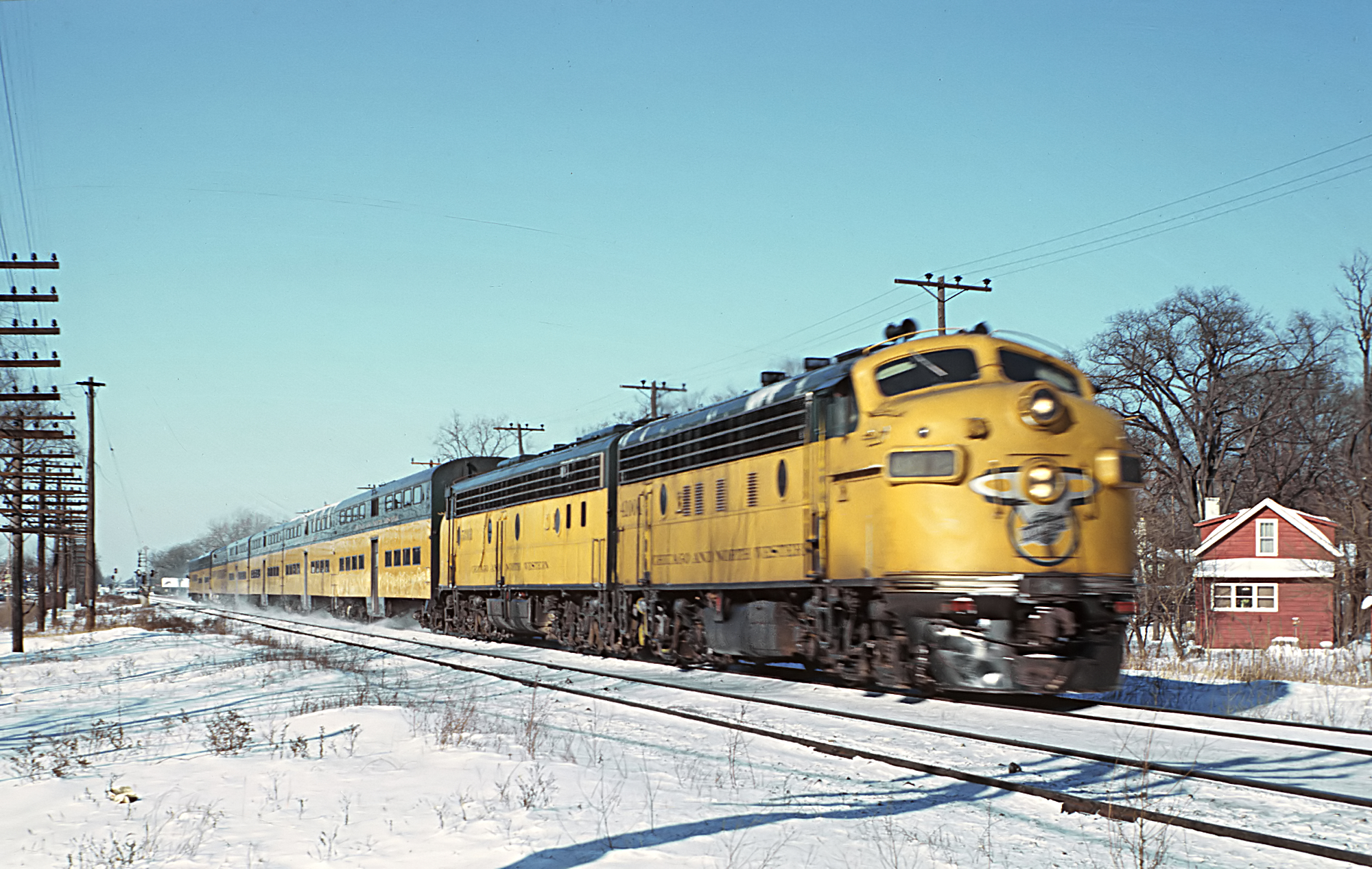
The bilevel Peninsula 400 in Kenilworth, Illinois on January 24, 1963

By 1954, the railroad petitioned the Michigan Public Service Commission to abandon the Escanaba–Ishpeming portion of the route. The railroad claimed it lost $80,000 a year from continuing the train to Ishpeming. Even though eight years later the service required an additional five passenger cars during the holiday season, it still could not sustain a yearly profit.

In October 1958 the Peninsula 400 received bilevel equipment including coaches, a lounge and a parlor car. This introduction marked the first time a North American passenger train used head end power (HEP) in preference to steam heat. Around this time, the train was featured in the 1959 film Anatomy of a Murder in scenes captured at the Ishpeming train station. Until some point in 1960 or 1961 the CNW ran a night train counterpart via Manitowoc, the Iron Country, with coaches, dining car, parlor car, tavern-lounge car, and a sleeper with accommodations ranging from roomettes to double bedrooms and a compartment.

While the Commission did not allow the North Western to abandon the train in 1954, it reversed its position fifteen years later. As such, the Peninsula 400 made its last Chicago–Ishpeming run on July 15, 1969, and with it went the Chicago and Northwestern's "400" moniker. An unnamed remnant continued to run between Chicago and Green Bay until the formation of Amtrak on May 1, 1971. The Peninsula 400 remains the last regular passenger train to have serviced the Upper Peninsula; the area is now plied by intercity buses, and the nearest rail station for most UP residents is located 172 miles to the south of Marinette in Milwaukee, Wisconsin.

== Accidents ==
On January 31, 1949, in Rock, Michigan, the Peninsula 400 had an overheated bearing on a failed traction motor that caused a derailment. There was one death and 15 injured. A similar accident happened on January 11 to the Seaboard Coast Line Orange Blossom Special, which also had an overheated bearing on a traction motor on the diesel locomotive, which then seized and caused a derailment. There was one death and 76 injured. In both cases the overheated motor froze up, which caused the wheel to stop turning and wear down a flat spot, eventually derailing the trains.

In 1957, seven Peninsula 400 cars derailed near Brown Deer, Wisconsin, causing 22 injuries. In 1963, the express ran into a stopped freight train in Marinette, Wisconsin. Fifteen people were injured.

== Bibliography ==
- "Decade of the Streamliners". Railway Age. 116 (17): 747–54. 22 April 1944. Archived from the original on 3 October 2023.
- Keyser, Lloyd A. (2005). Chicago & North Western In Color. Vol. 3. Scotch Plains, NJ: Morning Sun Books. ISBN 978-1582481500.
- McCommons, James (2009). Waiting on a Train: The Embattled Future of Passenger Rail Service a Year Spent Riding Across America. White River Junction, VT: Chelsea Green Publishing. ISBN 978-1603580649.
- Scribbins, Jim (March 1997). "The 400". Pacific RailNews. No. 398. Archived from the original on 2014-01-02.
