= Twin Cities 400 =

Former passenger train service between Chicago and Saint Paul

400 Twin Cities 400
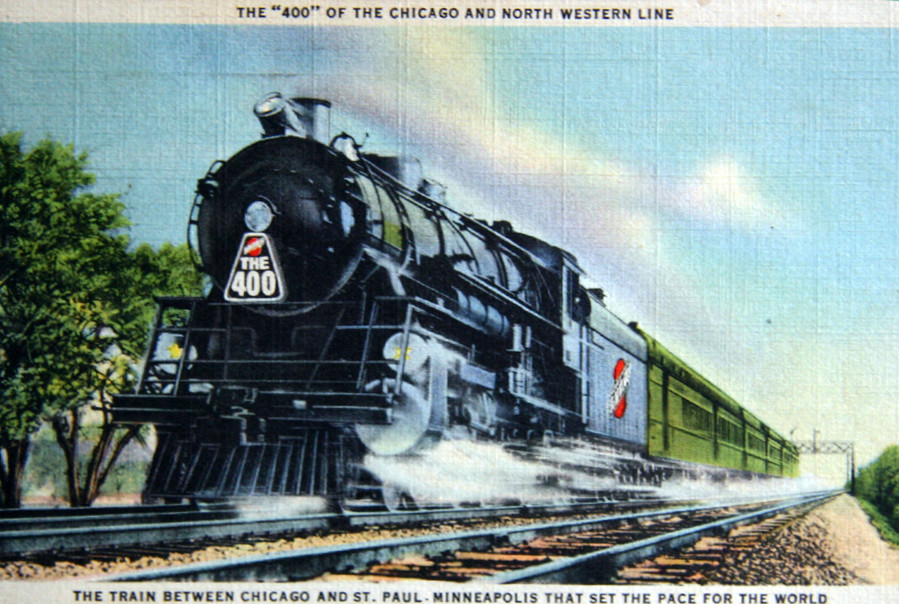
- The 400 of 1936

Overview
- Service type: Express train
- Status: Discontinued
- Locale: Minnesota, Wisconsin, Illinois
- First service: January 2, 1935
- Last service: July 23, 1963
- Former operators: Chicago, St. Paul, Minneapolis and Omaha Railway (Minneapolis–Wyeville); Chicago and North Western Railway (Wyeville–Chicago)

Route
- Termini: Great Northern Depot, Minneapolis, Minnesota; North Western Terminal, Chicago, Illinois
- Stops: 10
- Train number: 400, 401

Technical
- Track gauge: 4 ft 8 1/2 in (1,435 mm) standard gauge
- Operating speed: 63 mph (101 km/h) average (1950–1955)

The 400 (later named the Twin Cities 400) was a named passenger train operated by the Chicago and North Western Railway between Chicago and Saint Paul, with a final stop in Minneapolis. The train took its name from the schedule of 400 miles between the cities in 400 minutes, and was also a nod to "The Four Hundred Club", a term coined by Ward McAllister to refer to the social elite of New York City in the late 19th century. It was an express train with limited stops between Chicago and the Twin Cities. The "400" ran from 1935 to 1963 on the Chicago to Twin Cities route. The C&NW later named their other passenger trains using the number "400".

== Background ==
A lightweight streamlined train, the Pioneer Zephyr, was introduced in 1934 in the United States by the Chicago, Burlington and Quincy Railroad. The CB&Q was a competitor to the Chicago and North Western Railway on Chicago to Minneapolis-St.Paul rail service. The C&NW had not invested in the new diesel powered passenger train technology, but decided to upgrade track and motive power for higher speeds with heavyweight, steam-powered trains.

=== Adams cutoff ===
The main route between Chicago and the Twin Cities for the C&NW went through Madison, Wisconsin and met the Chicago, St. Paul, Minneapolis and Omaha Railway in Elroy, Wisconsin. The C&NW Chicago to St. Paul Viking train used this route through Madison, taking about 12 hours. In 1910, the Milwaukee, Sparta, and Northwestern Railroad, a subsidiary of the C&NW, began the "Air Line" or "Adams Cutoff" from Adams, Wisconsin towards Sparta, Wisconsin. It began operation in 1911. This railroad met the Omaha Railway in Wyeville, Wisconsin as part of the new route between Milwaukee and St. Paul, but not going through Madison. It became the route for the overnight North Western Limited, which used heavyweight Pullman cars between Chicago and the Twin Cities. The North Western Limited took 12 hours on this route.

=== Higher speed to Milwaukee ===
C&NW made their first upgrades in 1934 along the 85-mile (137 km) line between Chicago and Milwaukee, Wisconsin, introducing the 90-minute Pacemaker service to compete with the Chicago, Milwaukee, St. Paul & Pacific Railroad (Milwaukee Road) which introduced a similar train.

=== Competition to the Twin Cities ===
Attention then turned to faster trains to Saint Paul: The CB&Q ran a Zephyr demonstration train between Chicago and the Twin Cities that summer with the intent to run regular service the next year, and the Milwaukee Road introduced similar plans. The C&NW focused on the Adams cutoff route running west from Milwaukee. The railroad also upgraded its locomotives and passenger cars. Four C&NW Class E-2 4-6-2 Pacific locomotives built by American-Schenectady in 1923 were converted to run on oil rather than coal and had other upgrades to help them run at high speed, becoming Class E-2-a engines. The passenger cars got air conditioning and improved suspension parts for a smoother ride.

== Service history ==
A test run was made on December 30, 1934, but the regular train started on January 2, 1935. Time dubbed the 400, "the fastest train scheduled on the American Continent, fastest in all the world on a stretch over 200 mi." While the 400 implied "400 miles in 400 minutes", Chicago to St. Paul was 408.6 miles (657.6 km) in 420 minutes (7 hours), with the station stop at St. Paul and the last leg to Minneapolis taking another 30 minutes. The 400s had priority over all other trains; the employee timetable specified that "Freight trains, transfer trains, and switch engines must clear the schedules of Nos. 400 and 401 [by] fifteen (15) minutes." Other 400 trains would receive similar instructions in later years, and the rule remained in effect for most of the Twin Cities 400's existence.

On the first day the train reached 91 miles per hour (146 km/h). On April 28 the schedule was shortened by 30 minutes to reach the mile-a-minute pace the line promised, and matching the 6½-hour pace of the newly introduced Milwaukee Road Hiawatha and the Burlington's Twin Cities Zephyr. This included a 75-minute schedule between Chicago and Milwaukee, averaging 68 mph (109 km/h) there and 63 mph (101 km/h) overall. One day in late 1935 the 400 needed to make up time and reached 108 mph (174 km/h). Later, streamlined diesel trains were said to reach 112 mph (180 km/h).

C&NW renamed the first 400 to Twin Cities 400 in late 1941 as the C&NW prepared to rename almost all of its passenger trains as part of the 400 fleet, including the Flambeau 400, Minnesota 400, Peninsula 400, Shoreland 400, Valley 400 and the later Kate Shelley 400.

From 1950 to 1955 the train ran its shortest schedule, 6¼ hours between St. Paul and Chicago, an average of over 65 mph (105 km/h). In 1952 the railroad installed automatic train stop along the eastern half of the route from Chicago to Wyeville due to regulations from the Interstate Commerce Commission. This allowed the train to run at 95 to 100 mph (153 to 161 km/h) there, although the western part of the line did not get upgrades and was limited to 79 mph (127 km/h). The pace reverted to a 6½-hour schedule in 1955 and in 1960 to the 7-hour pace established in 1935. C&NW ceased running the Twin Cities 400 in 1963 and all intercity passenger service on C&NW ended with the formation of Amtrak in 1971. Today, the Twin Cities to Chicago route is served by the Amtrak Borealis, which takes about seven hours. The route is also covered by the Seattle/Portland-to-Chicago Empire Builder. Both trains run on the former Milwaukee Road, now Canadian Pacific.

=== July 1959 derailment ===
On July 30, 1959, the Twin Cities 400 left the rails between Knapp and Menomonie in Dunn County, Wisconsin. Fifty people were taken to area hospitals with injuries out of the 115 passengers. Trees along the elevated railway prevented the rail coaches from plummeting to Highway 12 below. This was locally known as the "Miracle of the trees."

== Equipment ==
The 400 was notable for fast trains of its day in that it originally ran with rebuilt or upgraded, rather than new equipment. This stood in stark comparison to the Milwaukee Road's Hiawatha and the Burlington Zephyrs, each of which first ran with brand new locomotives and cars. Each 400 train required two steam locomotives, which were swapped partway through the trip, primarily because some grease fittings on the train could not withstand the entire journey at high speed.

The steam locomotives were upgraded to feature a 45° lamp on top of the boiler just ahead of the smokestack. These lights were intended to announce the approach of the train and could be seen for a great distance in rural areas. In 1937, one locomotive was equipped with a prototype Mars light, the first ever put into use. The three-million-candela lamp had a gyrating reflector which traced a figure-8 pattern ahead of the engine.

C&NW updated the train in 1939 with two pairs of EMD E3A locomotives and lightweight streamlined passenger cars. Two engines were required because the diesels didn't have as much power as the older steam locomotives. However, they were extremely reliable, with only one major breakdown in the first two years of service. These were followed by E6 locomotives in 1941, and E7s in 1947. E8s saw some service in the 1950s, though they were initially purchased for other routes.

== Route ==
The train originated at the Chicago and North Western Terminal (now the Ogilvie Transportation Center) on Madison Street in Chicago. It ran to Milwaukee on the lakefront commuter line and stopped at the Lake Front Depot on Wisconsin Avenue. It ran to Wyeville, Wisconsin where it followed the Omaha Road route to St. Paul. It stopped at the Saint Paul Union Depot, and then made the short run to the Minneapolis Great Northern Depot over the Stone Arch Bridge.

The North Western Limited train was an overnight train that also used the Twin Cities 400 route, but taking 9 hours and only stopping at Altoona and Adams between St. Paul and Milwaukee.

The Viking was another named C&NW passenger train that followed a different route, through Elroy, Wisconsin and Madison, Wisconsin, and made limited stops between Chicago and St. Paul. It took roughly 12 hours as a daylight train. The Victory was the overnight train on this route.

== Name ==
Along the routes of the Twin Cities 400 and its sister trains, there were a number of bars titled "400 Club", paying homage to the train and the social status.

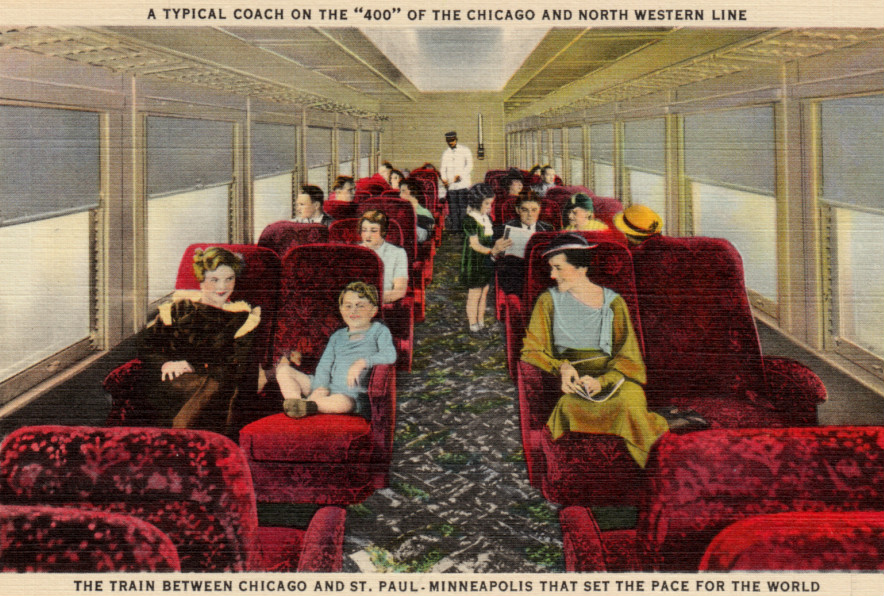
Coach car, c. 1930s.

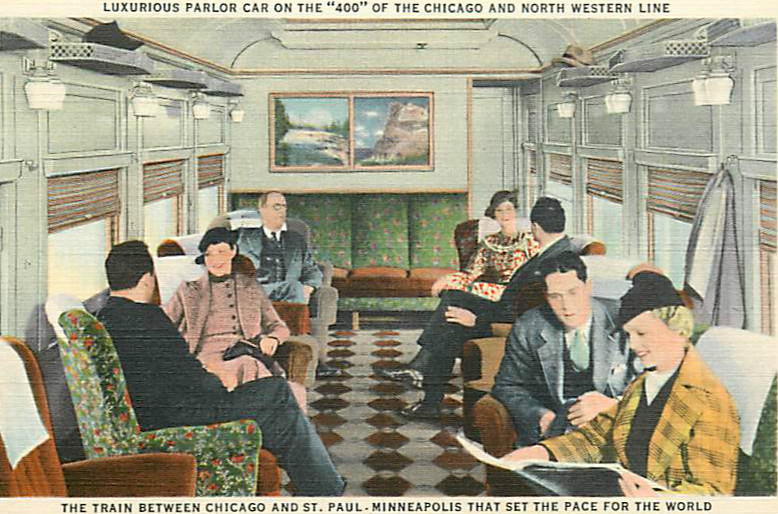
Parlor car, c. 1930s.

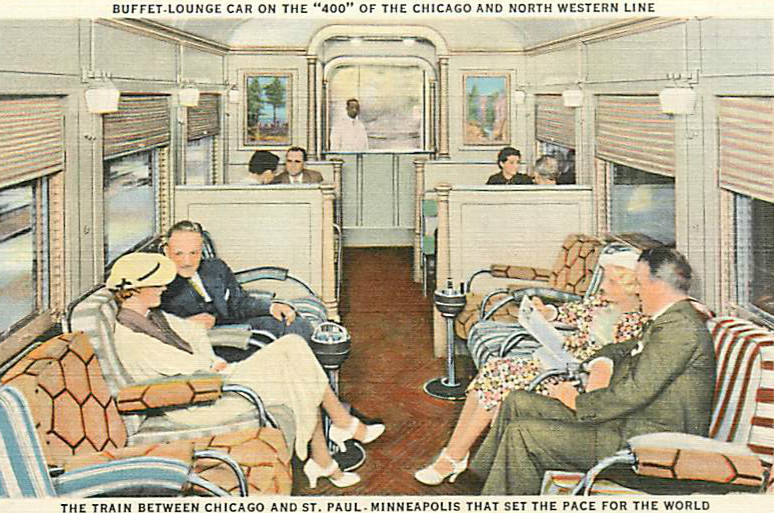
Lounge car, c. 1930s.

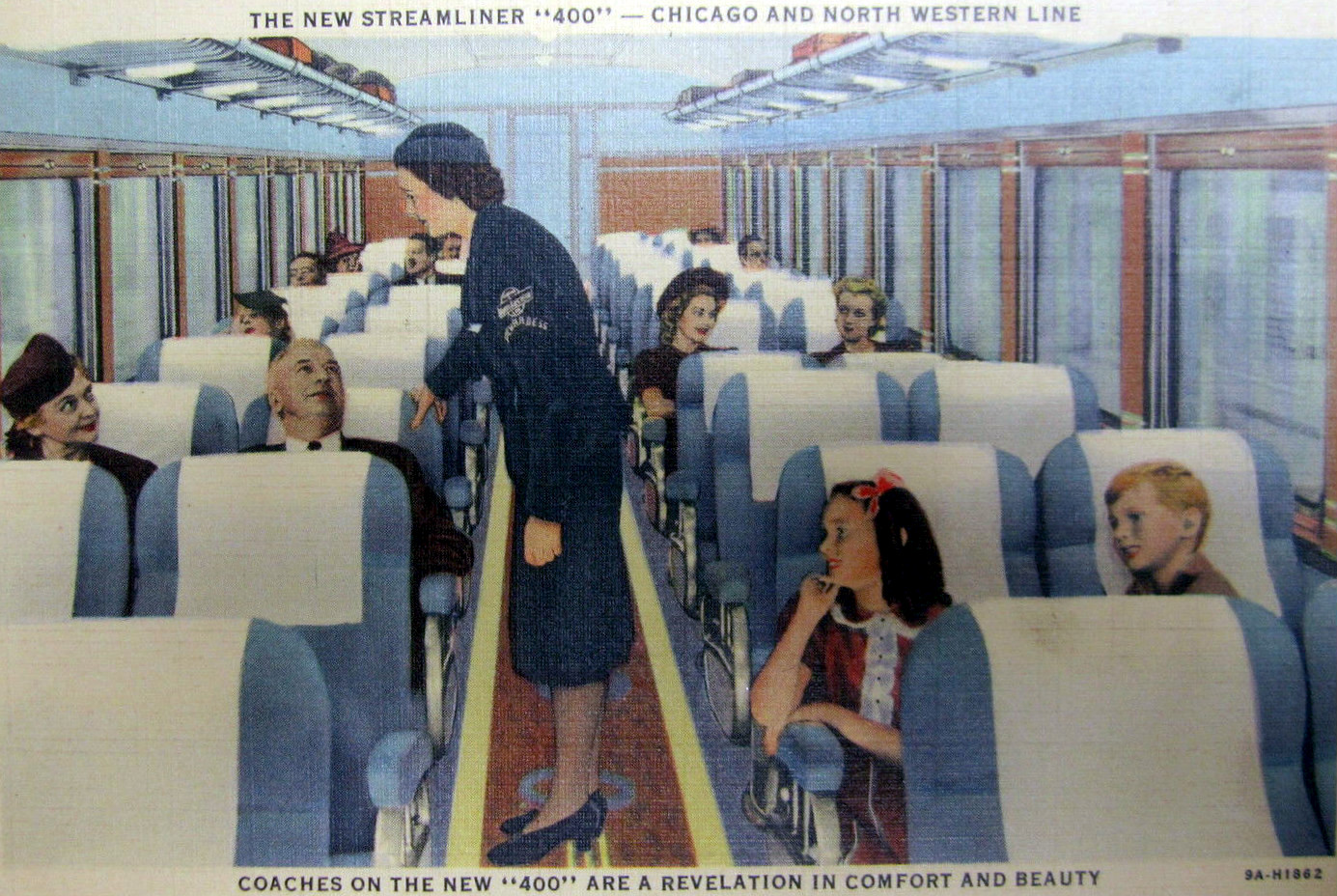
Coach car with stewardess, c. 1940s.

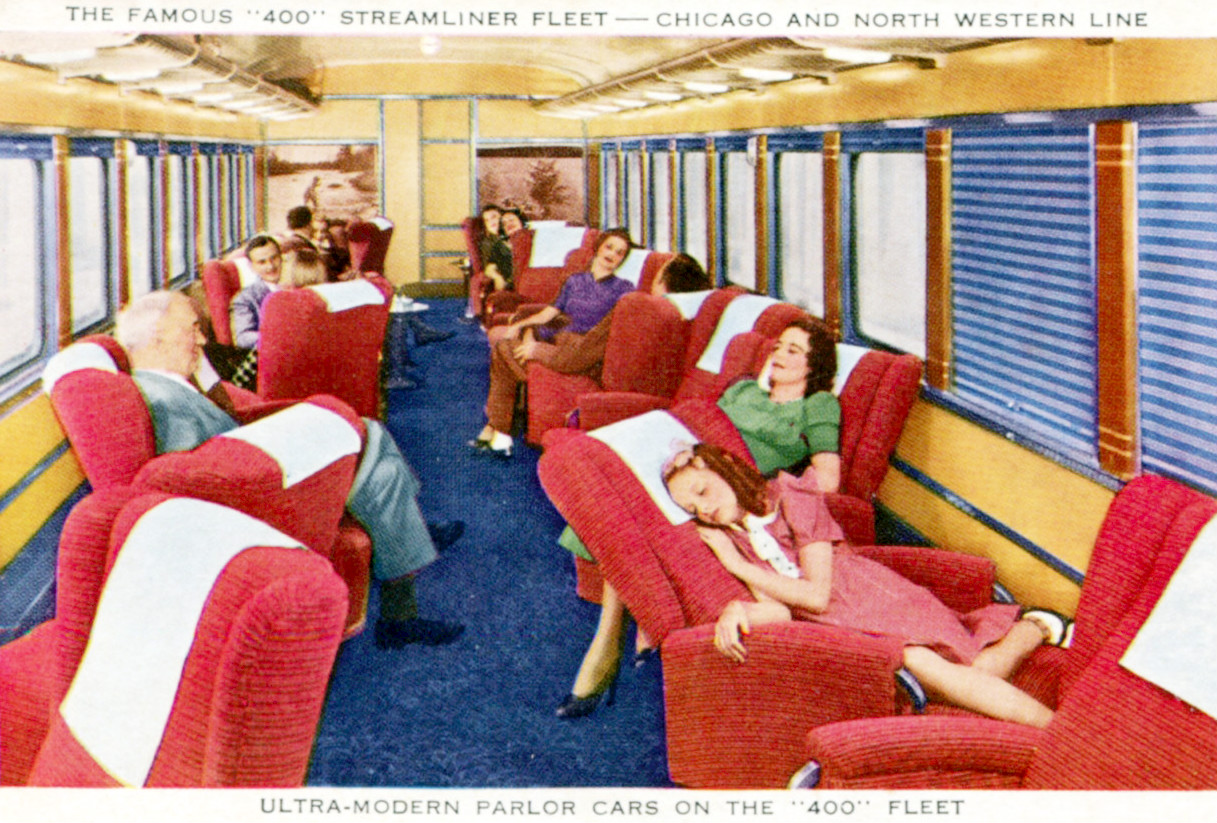
Parlor car, c. 1940s.

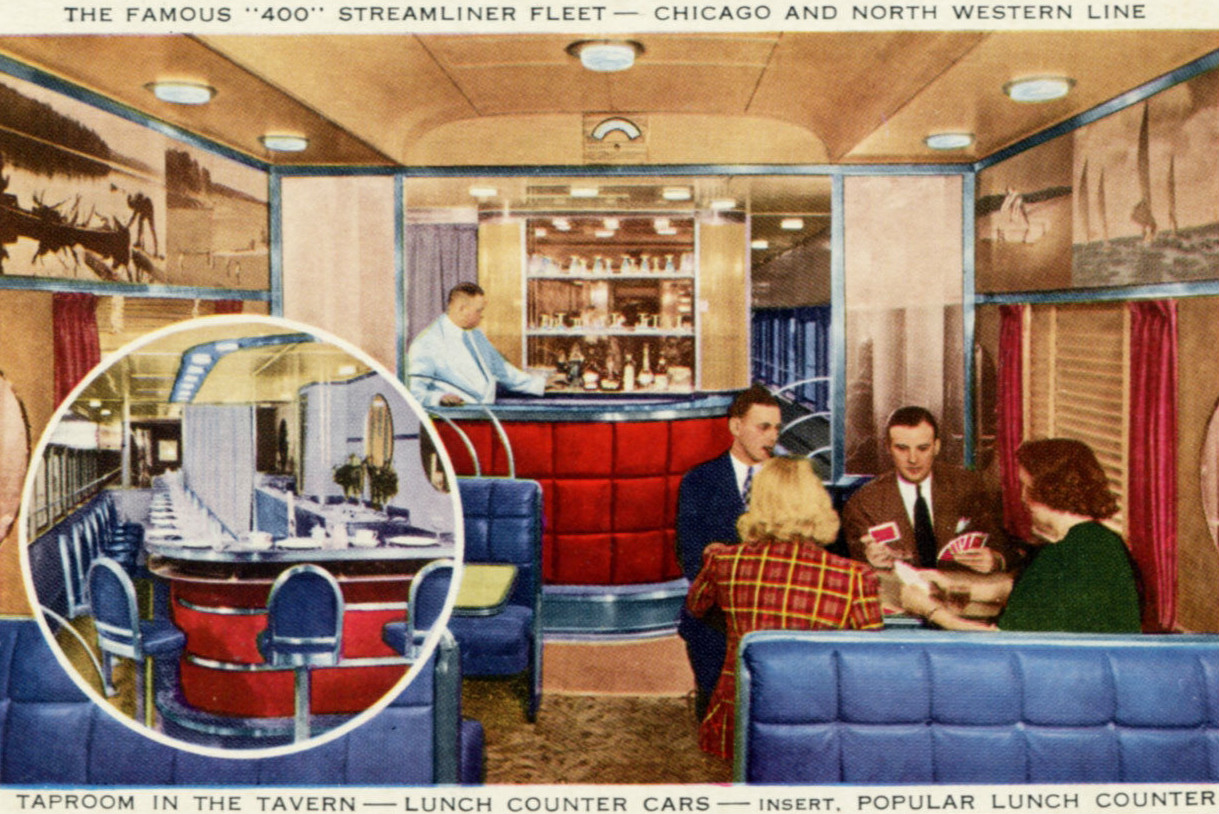
Lounge car with speedometer over the bar, c. 1940s.

== Bibliography ==
- "Chicago and North Western: A Capsule History". Chicago and North Western Historical Society. Archived from the original on May 22, 2016.
- "The Twin Cities 400, First and Most Famous of the North Western's 400s". American-Rails.com.
- Chicago And NorthWestern System [Time Table]. Rand McNally, March 14, 1948
- Scribbins, Jim (2008) [1982]. The 400 Story. Minneapolis, Minnesota: University of Minnesota Press. ISBN 978-0-8166-5449-9.
