= Chicago and North Western E-2 class =

Class of 12 American 4-6-2 Pacific Type steam locomotives

CNW class E-2
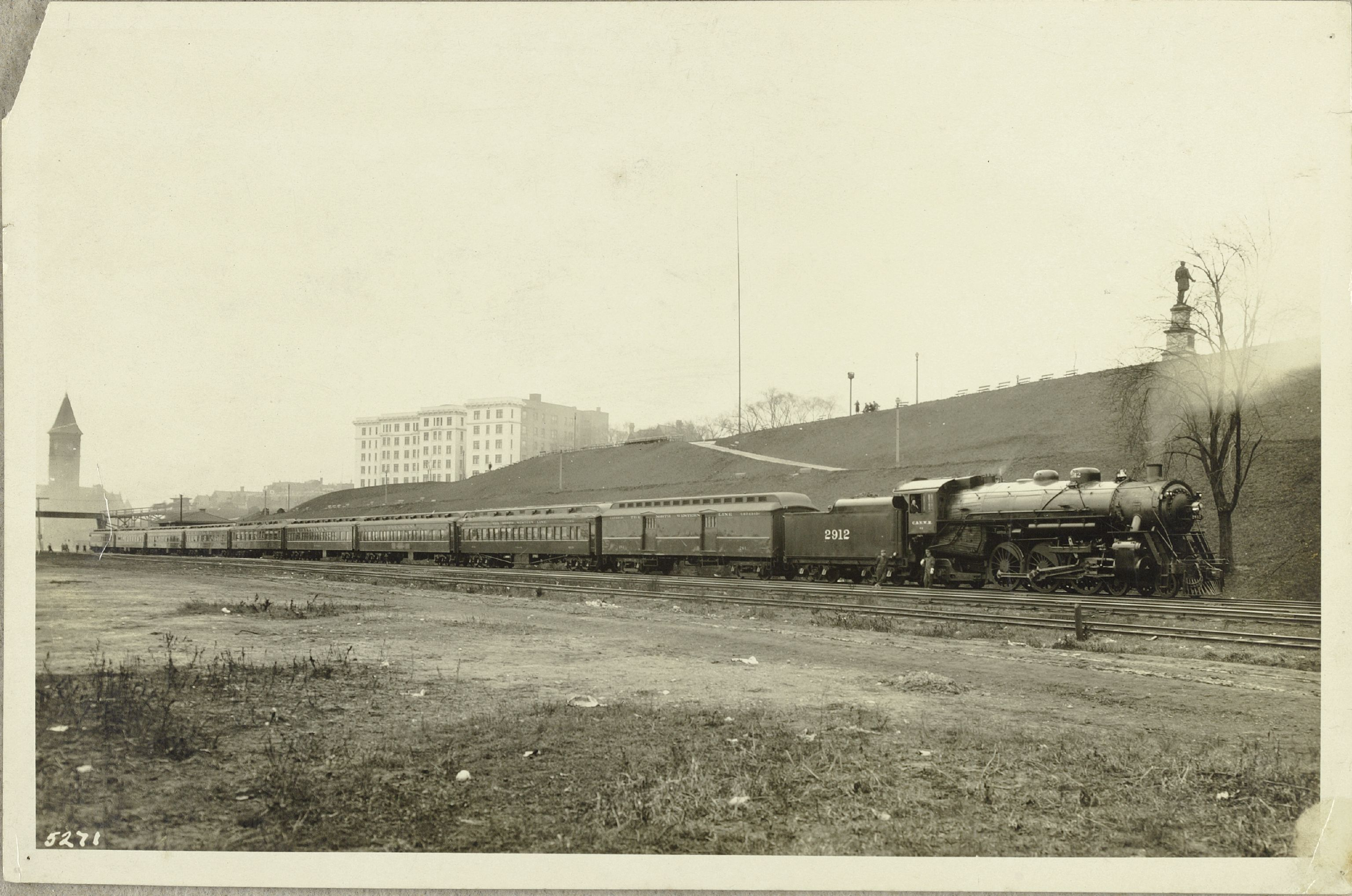
Type and origin
- Power type: Steam
- Builder: American Locomotive Company
- Serial number: 64463–64474
- Build date: 1923
- Total produced: 12
Specifications
- Configuration
  - Whyte: 4-6-2
  - UIC: 2′C1′ h2
- Gauge: 4 ft 8 1/2 in (1,435 mm)
- Driver dia.: E-2: 75 in (1,905 mm); E-2-a/b: 79 in (2,007 mm)
- Adhesive weight: 178,500 lb (81.0 tonnes)
- Loco weight: 295,000 lb (133.8 tonnes)
- Total weight: E-2-a: 529,000 lb (240.0 tonnes)
- Fuel type: E-2, E-2-b: Coal; E-2-a: Oil
- Fuel capacity: E-2-a: 5,000 US gal (19,000 L; 4,200 imp gal), E-2-b: 32,000 lb (14.5 tonnes)
- Water cap.: E-2-a: 15,000 US gal (57,000 L; 12,000 imp gal); E-2-b: 10,000 US gal (38,000 L; 8,300 imp gal)
- Firebox
  - Grate area: 63.1 sq ft (5.86 m^{2})
- Boiler pressure: E-2: 210 psi (1.45 MPa); E-2-a/b: 225 psi (1.55 MPa)
- Heating surface: 3,235.2 sq ft (300.56 m^{2})
- Superheater
  - Heating area: 882 sq ft (81.9 m^{2})
- Cylinders: Two
- Cylinder size: 26 in × 28 in (660 mm × 711 mm)
- Valve gear: Walschaerts
- Valve type: Piston valves
Performance figures
- Tractive effort: E-2: 45,050 lbf (200.39 kN), E-2-a/b: 45,800 lbf (203.73 kN)
Career
- Operators: Chicago and North Western Railway
- Numbers: 2901–2912
- Scrapped: 1954–1956
- Disposition: All scrapped

The Chicago and North Western Railway's Class E-2 was a 4-6-2 "Pacific" type locomotive built by the American Locomotive Company in Schenectady, New York in 1923. Twelve were originally built, and all were later converted. Four of these locomotives gained the Class E-2-a designation in late 1934 when they were converted to burn oil instead of coal, upgraded with larger drivers, and had other changes made in order to run at higher speeds in preparation for pulling the Twin Cities–Chicago 400 the next year. The other eight were converted to Class E-2-b, which was similar except they remained coal-fired.

The E-2-a was among the fastest steam locomotives in the world in 1935. It was recorded running in excess of 108 miles per hour (174 km/h) on a fall evening that year as it raced the 85 miles (137 km) from Milwaukee to Chicago in 65 minutes, attaining its highest speeds between Highland Park and Evanston. While fast for its day, it was not quite a match for the Milwaukee Road class A and later F7 engines, which ran the rival Hiawatha.

Unlike the Hiawatha engines, the E-2s never ran with streamlined shrouds, though it appeared for a time that they would be replaced by streamlined class E-4 4-6-4 "Hudson" locomotives on the 400 route. C&NW ordered eight E-4s in 1937, later adding one more order to the total. However, the railway decided instead to use diesel-electric EMD E3 locomotives for the 400, which replaced the E-2-a engines on the route in 1939.
