= Chicago and North Western D class =

CNW class D Omaha Road class G-3
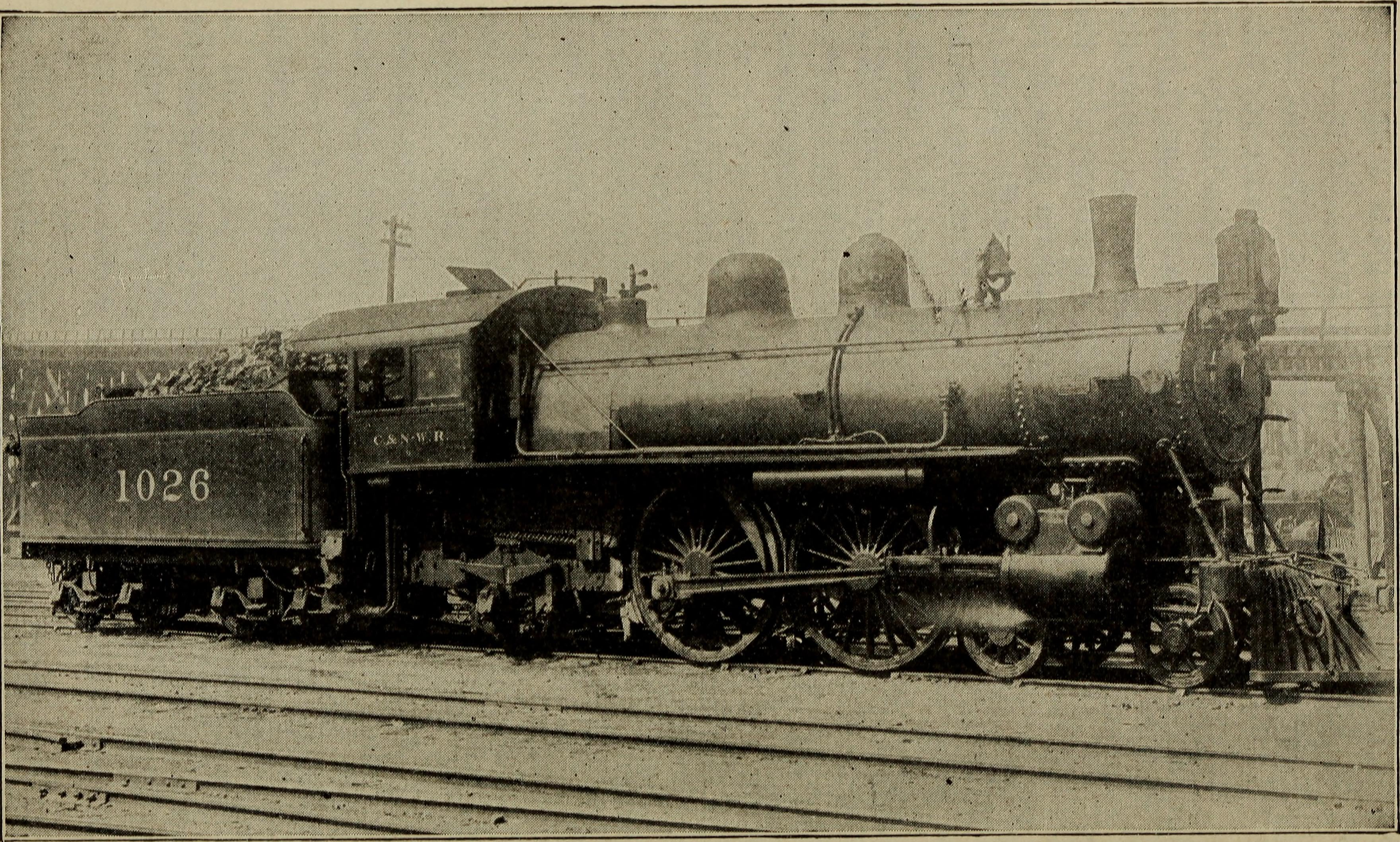
- CNW 1026, one a batch of locomotives fitted with Young valve gear and Young rotary valves.
Type and origin
- Power type: Steam
- Builder: Schenectady Locomotive Works; American Locomotive Company
- Serial number: see table
- Build date: 1900–1908
- Total produced: 92 (CNW) 7
Specifications
- Configuration
  - Whyte: 4-4-2
  - UIC: 2′B1′ n2 (rather 2'B1 - trailing wheels, not truck)
- Driver: Second
- Gauge: 4 ft 8 1/2 in (1,435 mm)
- Leading dia.: 37 1/4 in (0.946 m)
- Driver dia.: 81 in (2.057 m)
- Trailing dia.: 49 in (1.245 m)
- Wheelbase
  - Engine: 26 ft 9 in (8.15 m)
  - Drivers: 84 in (2.13 m)
  - Tender: 20 ft 0 in (6.10 m)
  - Tender truck: 5 ft 2 in (1.575 m)
- Height: 15 ft 1 5/8 in (4.613 m) over chimney
- Firebox
  - Type
  - Grate area: 46.22 sq ft (4.294 m^{2}) (102 in × 65 1/4 in or 2.59 m × 1.66 m)
- Boiler
  - Pitch: 9 ft 3 in (2.82 m)
  - Diameter: 68 1/2 in (1.74 m)
- Boiler pressure: 200 lbf/in^{2} (1,400 kPa; 14 kgf/cm^{2})
- Cylinders: Two
- Cylinder size: 20 in × 26 in (508 mm × 660 mm)
- Valve gear: Stepehenson, Young, or Walschearts
- Valve type: Piston valves, or Young rotary valves
Performance figures
- Tractive effort: 25,700 lbf (114.32 kN)
Career
- Operators: Chicago and North Western Railway; Omaha Road
- Class: CNW: D; CMO: G-3; (Omaha Road)
- Number in class: CNW: 92; CMO: 7
- Numbers: see tables
- Retired: 1931–1952
- Preserved: CNW 1015
- Disposition: One preserved, remainder scrapped

The Chicago and North Western Railway D Class was a class of 92 American 4-4-2 "Atlantic" locomotives. They were built by Schenectady Locomotive Works and by its corporate successor the American Locomotive Company between 1900 and 1908. In addition, the Chicago, St. Paul, Minneapolis and Omaha Railway (Omaha Road) bought seven, classifying them as class G-3

== Design ==
The locomotives had a boiler pressurized to 200 pounds-force per square inch (1.38 MPa) providing steam to two cylinders with a 20-inch (508 mm) bore and a 26-inch (660 mm) stroke. They were connected to 81-inch (2,057 mm) driving wheels by a variety of valve gear: most had Stephenson valve gear and 11-inch (279 mm) piston valves; No. 1026 was fitted up with Youngs rotary valves and valve gear in 1903, but later reverted to Stephensons valve gear. The 1908 batch had Walschaerts valve gear, the first five locomotives having piston valves and the last ten were delivered with Young rotary valves; these were replaced with piston valves when the locomotives were fitted with superheaters.

== Construction ==
All 92 locomotives were built by Schenectady Locomotive Works (SLW) and by the same works under its corporate successor, the American Locomotive Company (ALCO).

In September 1904, ALCO announced their introduction to steam locomotives with superheated boilers, following some successful test runs by a European locomotive at a St. Louis exhibition. The C&NW subsequently asked ALCO to construct one D class 4-4-2 (No. 1300) and one R-1 class 4-6-0 (No. 76) with superheated boilers. The railroad became unsatisfied with the performance of Nos. 1300 and 76, and no further D's or R-1's were built new with superheaters.

Table of orders and numbers
Year	Quantity	Manufacturer	Serial numbers	C&NW numbers	Notes
1900	6	Schenectady	5613–5618	1015–1020	
1901	4	Schenectady	5840–5843	1021–1024	
1901	6	Schenectady	6138–6142/44	1025–1030	
1902	6	Alco (S)	25411–25416	1080–1085	
1902	6	Alco (S)	26524–26529	1086–1091	
1903	10	Alco (S)	27571–27580	1092–1101	
1904	12	Alco (S)	29705–29716	113, 152, 464, 475, 482, 493, 895, 1303–1307	
1905	6	Alco (S)	30294–30298	1297–1302	
1905	4	Alco (S)	38509–38512	367–370	Omaha Road
1906	10	Alco (S)	39247–39256	1308–1317	
1906	3	Alco (S)	39410–39412	364–366	Omaha Road
1907	10	Alco (S)	42200–42209	1443–1452	
1908	15	Alco (S)	45697–45711	125–128, 158, 390–399	

== Service ==
At the time of their introduction, wooden cars were the norm. The class D locomotives were quite capable of pulling a 10-car, 400-ton train on the 138-mile Chicago to Clinton route in 3 hours 25 minutes inclusive of eleven stops.

Unfortunately, steel cars came into use soon after, and the locomotives became outclassed. They were then downgraded to commuter service and locals.

On the Omaha Road, one of the later uses of their class G-3 was powering the Minneapolis to Ashland train The Namakagon substituting for the regular gas-electric car when it was in the shops or the load exceeded its two-car capacity.

Retirements started in 1931, and continued until the end of steam in 1956 when the last two were retired from Chicago commuter service.

Table of CNW pre-1948 scrappings
Year	Quantity in service at start of year	Quantity scrapped	Numbers	Notes
1931	91	1	1087	
1936	90	3	1306, 1314, 1443	
1937	87	1	1302	
1938	86	9	1018/90/91, 1100, 1300/05/09, 1448/52	
1939	77	6	1019/21/84, 1101, 1447/49	
1940	71	24	125/27, 390/92/93/96/98, 464, 895, 1024/27/30/82/85/89/92/93/99, 1303/04/10, 1444/46/51	
1941	47	5	1025/28/81/94, 1445	
1942	42	3	1026/86, 1313	
1943	39	6	128, 391, 475, 1029/80/88	
1944	33	4	152, 1095, 1301, 1315	
1945	29	4	1308, 1311, 1312, 1317	
1947	25	4	493, 1015, 1083, 1450	

Table of Omaha retirements
Year	Quantity in service at start of year	Quantity scrapped	Numbers	Notes
1945	7	3	366, 368, 370	
1946	4	1	369	
1949	3	1	367	
1950	2	1	365	
1952	1	0	364	

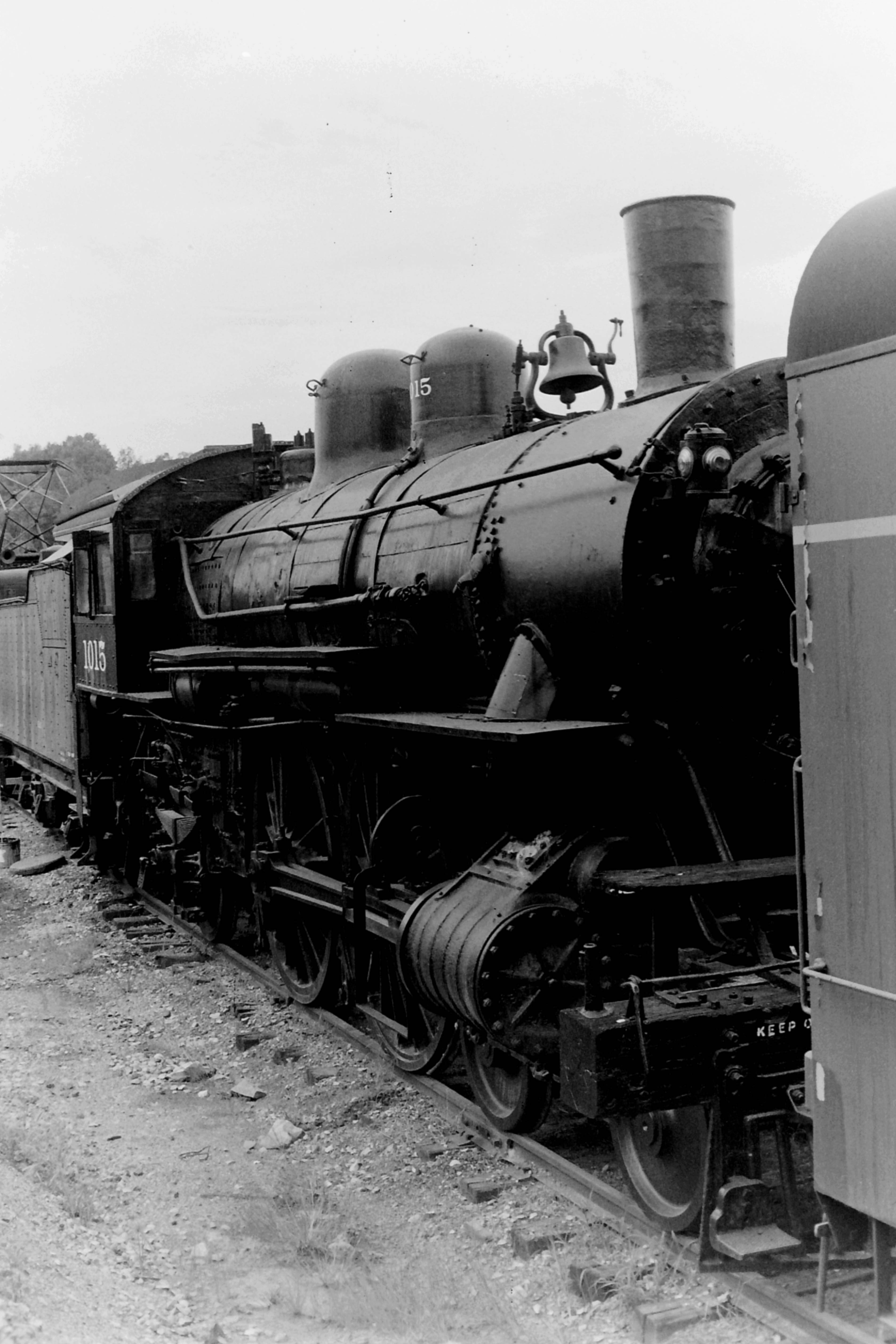
CNW 1015 at the Museum of Transportation in 1970

One locomotive has been preserved: CNW 1015, the first locomotive built. It is on display at the National Museum of Transportation at Kirkwood, Missouri.
