= The Quentin Collection =

- Location: Kildeer, Illinois, United States
- Coordinates: 42°10′0″N 88°3′32″W
- Address: 20771 N. Rand Rd., Kildeer, IL 60047
- Opened: 2005
- Developer: Zaremba Group Inc.
- Owner: New Plan
- Floor area: 171,179 sq ft (15,903 m^{2})

The Quentin Collection is a moderate sized (171,179 square feet (15,903 m^{2})) lifestyle center/shopping plaza located in Kildeer, Illinois. It is located directly across from Deer Park Town Center, but both are located in different towns (DPTC being located in Deer Park, Illinois). The center, which opened in Fall 2005, is home to a mix of big-box retailers, and upscale retailers.

Major retailers include Best Buy, DSW, Inc., Kirkland's, PetSmart, Stein Mart, Fresh Market, and Furniture Kidz.

== Ownership ==
In September 2006, New York-based New Plan (now Brixmor Property Group) acquired The Quentin Collection from developer Zaremba Group Inc. of Lakewood, Ohio, for a reported sale price of US$27 million.
