= List of people from Watertown, New York =

The following is a list of notable people from Watertown, New York.

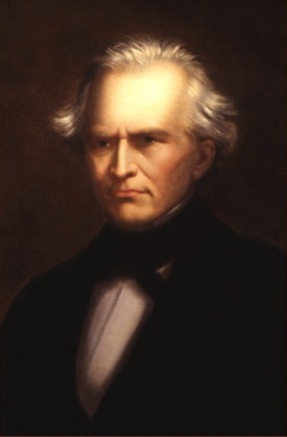
Samuel Beardsley.

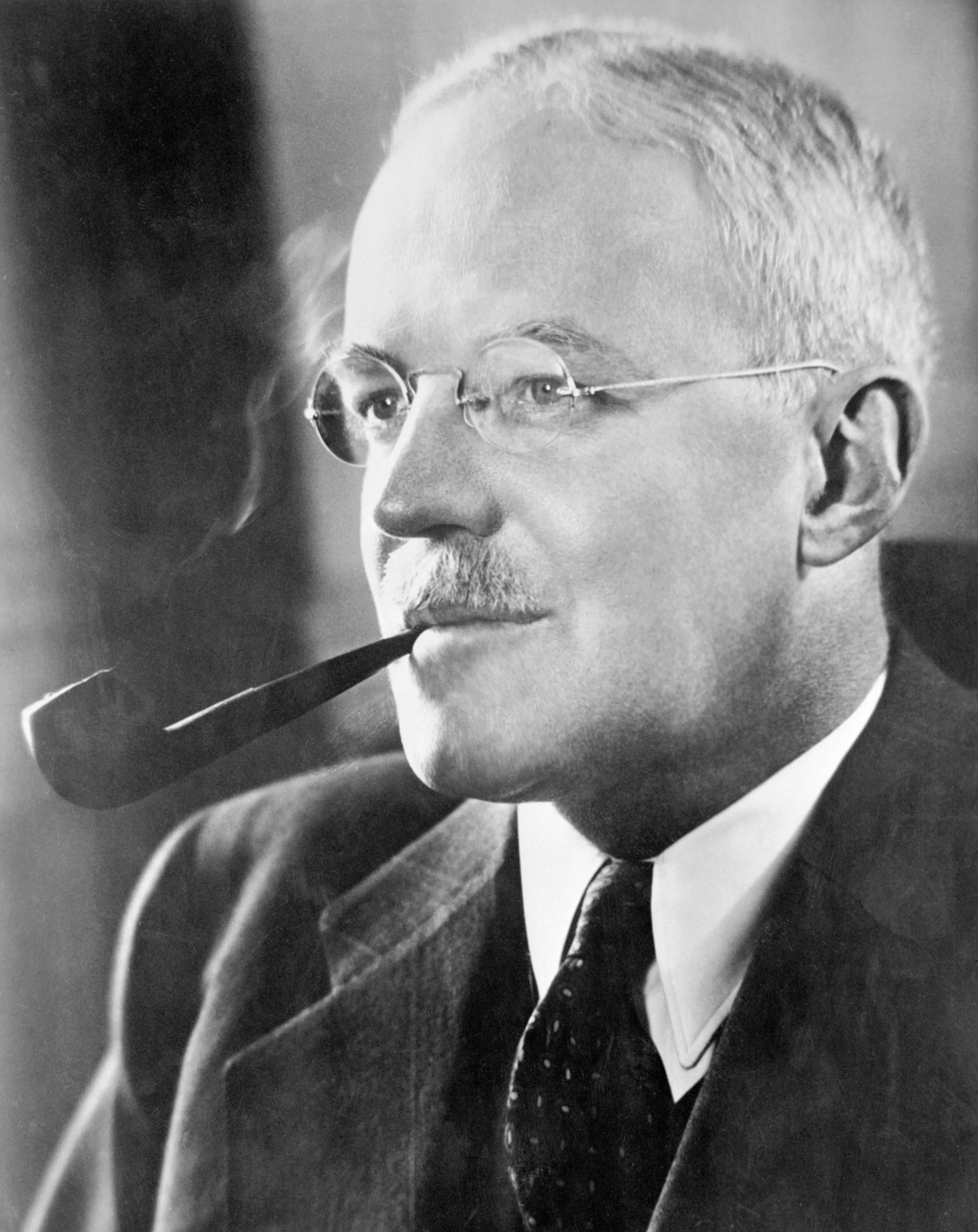
Allen Dulles.

- Eric Anzalone (born 1965), singer, actor, author, member of the Village People
- Samuel Beardsley, New York State Attorney General (1836–1839) and U.S. congressman
- Antonio Blakeney (born 1996), current professional basketball player for Hapoel Be'er Sheva of the Israeli Basketball Premier League; former NBA player
- Albert Bouchard (born 1947), drummer for and co-founding member of rock band Blue Öyster Cult
- Joe Bouchard, bassist for and co-founding member Blue Öyster Cult; brother of Albert Bouchard
- John Calhoun, founding publisher of the Chicago Democrat
- Rocco Canale, NFL player for Philadelphia Eagles (1944–1949)
- Emma Kerr-Carpenter, member of the Montana House of Representatives
- Reginald Case, artist
- Allen Welsh Dulles, director of the Central Intelligence Agency
- John Foster Dulles, U.S. Secretary of State
- Frederick Exley, author of A Fan's Notes, 1968, and other works
- Leonard J. Farwell, businessman and Wisconsin governor
- Moses W. Field, U.S. congressman, one of the founders of the Independent Greenback Party
- Paul Finkelman (born 1949), Chancellor of Gratz College, author, legal historian
- Roswell P. Flower, U.S. congressman and governor of New York (1892–1895)
- John Gary, singer
- Oscar S. Gifford, lawyer and South Dakota politician
- Eric Greif, lawyer and heavy metal music figure
- Richard Grieco (born 1965), actor, model, singer, former college football player
- Robert Guinan, painter
- Vic Hanson, athlete, enshrined in the Basketball Hall of Fame (1960) and the College Football Hall of Fame (1973)
- Fred Harvey Harrington, educator and president of the University of Wisconsin–Madison, born in Watertown.
- Serranus Clinton Hastings, U.S. congressman and founder of the Hastings College of the Law at the University of California
- Charles B. Hoard, businessman and member of the United States House of Representatives
- Mary-Margaret Humes, actress
- Orville Hungerford, U.S. congressman, banker, and railroad president
- Robert Lansing, U.S. Secretary of State
- Donald Lutz (born 1989), baseball player for Cincinnati Reds
- Dick May, NASCAR Sprint Cup driver
- Tim McCreadie, NASCAR Xfinity and ARCA series driver, and multiple national Late Model Dirt Series Champion.
- John M. McHugh, US Secretary of the Army
- Viggo Mortensen (born 1958), actor and author, star of The Lord of the Rings film trilogy, A History of Violence, and The Road
- Mark Neveldine, actor, writer, producer, director (Crank, Crank: High Voltage, Gamer, Ghost Rider: Spirit of Vengeance & The Vatican Tapes)
- Denis O'Brien, New York State Attorney General (1883–1887)
- Natalie Oliveros, wine expert, vineyard owner, model and adult actress known as Savanna Samson, raised in Watertown.
- Charles Pierce, female impersonator, particularly noted for his impersonation of Bette Davis.
- Matt Puccia, NASCAR Sprint Cup series crew chief
- Maggie Rizer, supermodel and AIDS activist
- Guy Robinson, Hall of Fame auto racing driver
- Gary M. Rose, former United States Army officer, Vietnam War veteran, and recipient of the Medal of Honor
- Virgil Ross, animator, born in Watertown
- Elwyn E. Royce, Wisconsin State Assemblyman
- Charles H. Sawyer, governor of New Hampshire
- Mary Gay Scanlon (born 1959), congresswomen from PA 5
- Arthur Shawcross, serial killer
- Electa Nobles Lincoln Walton (1824–1908), educator, lecturer, writer, and suffragist
- Frank Winfield Woolworth, founder of F. W. Woolworth Company/Five and Dime stores, worked at a store in Watertown at his start
- Charles W. Yost, U.S. Ambassador to the United Nations
- Zina D. H. Young, leader in the Church of Jesus Christ of Latter-day Saints and social activist
