= Lake Cook Road =

Highway in Illinois, United States

- County Line Road (Barrington Hills), Main Street (Barrington)
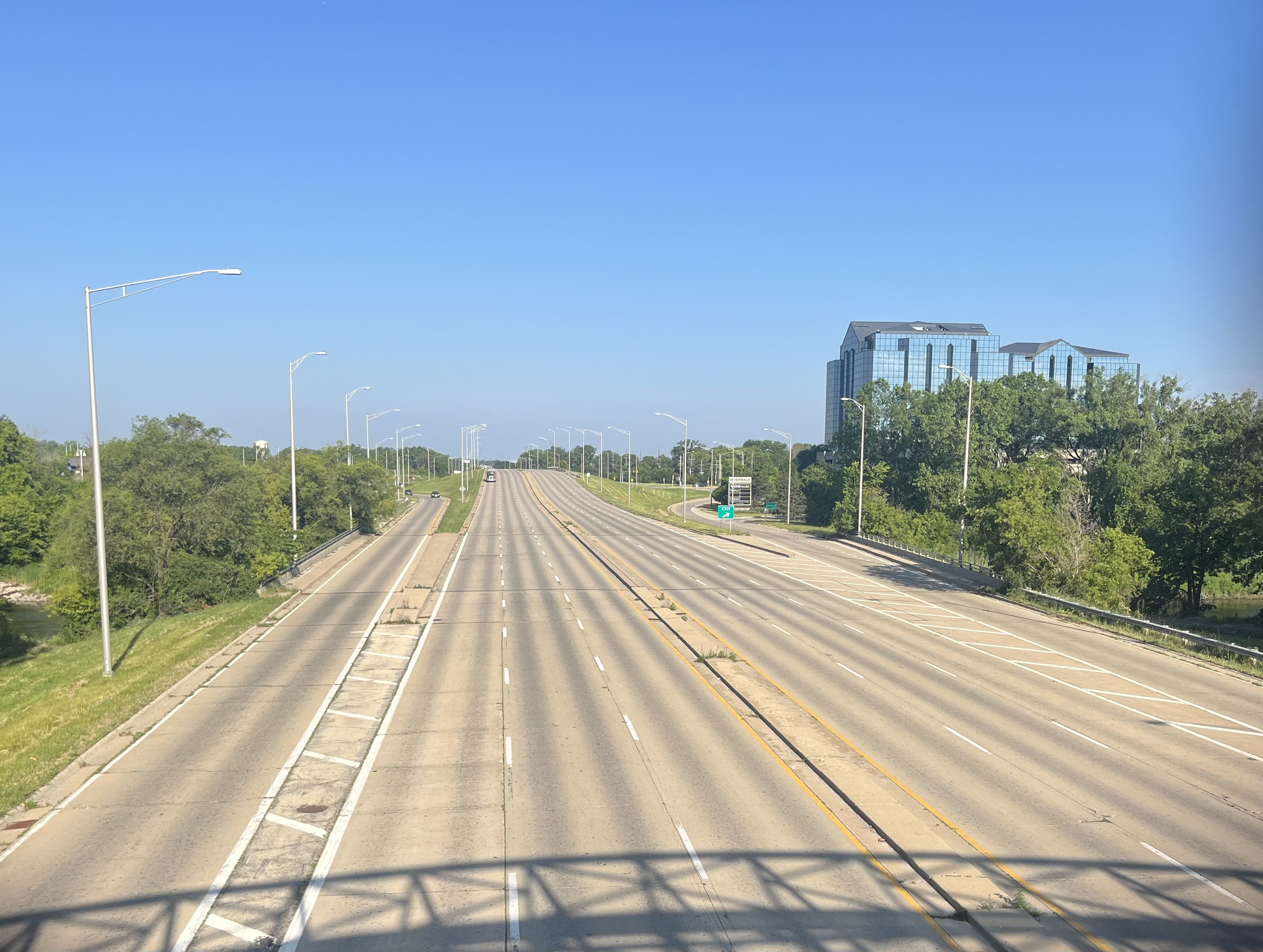
- Lake Cook Road from the Des Plaines River Trail
- Part of: CR A50
- Maintained by: the Illinois Department of Transportation, the Cook County Highway Department, and the McHenry County Division of Transportation
- Length: 25.5 mi (41.0 km)
- Location: Lake, Cook, McHenry, Kane counties
- West end: IL 62 (Algonquin Road) in Algonquin
- East end: Sheridan Road in Highland Park and Glencoe

Lake Cook Road (alternatively referred to as County Line Road or Main Street in some areas) is a major east–west highway in Cook, Lake, McHenry, and Kane Counties in Illinois. For much of its length, it marks the border between Cook and Lake Counties, hence the name of the road. In its western stretch, it marks the border between McHenry and Cook Counties, and further west, McHenry and Kane Counties. The road is approximately 25.5 miles (41.0 km) in length, from its western terminus at Illinois Route 62 in Algonquin to its eastern terminus at Sheridan Road in Highland Park and Glencoe, near Lake Michigan. The road is notable for its cross-section of Chicago's northern suburbs, balancing densely developed commercial, industrial, and residential land uses, with open space areas such as forest preserves, parks, golf courses, creeks, rivers, gardens, and Lake Michigan.

== Municipalities served ==
Lake Cook Road goes through, or runs adjacent to, sections of the following municipalities from west to east: Algonquin, Barrington Hills, Barrington, Deer Park, Palatine, Long Grove, Arlington Heights, Buffalo Grove, Wheeling, Riverwoods, Northbrook, Deerfield, Highland Park, and Glencoe.

== Roadway jurisdiction ==
The majority of the road, from Rand Road in Palatine to US 41 (Skokie Highway) in Northbrook is maintained by the Cook County Highway Department designated Cook County Trunk Highway A50. The Cook County-maintained stretch is four lanes wide, with the exception of the stretch between Lexington Drive and Wilmot Road where it is six lanes wide. The far western segment of the roadway (which is called Lake Cook Road in Algonquin and County Line Road in Barrington Hills) from Illinois Route 62 to Ridge Road in Algonquin and Barrington Hills is maintained by the McHenry County Division of Transportation designated McHenry County Highway A50. Other segments, such as the segment between Ridge Road and Quentin Road in Barrington and the eastern segment from Skokie Highway to Sheridan Road in Highland Park and Glencoe are maintained by the Illinois Department of Transportation without any route number.

== Route description ==
=== Barrington area (Algonquin Road to Quentin Road) ===
At its western terminus at Illinois Route 62 (Algonquin Road), the roadway begins as a two-lane road called Lake Cook Road near a residential neighborhood and commercial area in Algonquin. Further east, the road's name changes to County Line Road at Haegers Bend Road and the road travels through largely rural and sparsely developed sections in Barrington Hills, with a significant amount of dense wooded areas and estate-style development, making for a very scenic drive. However, wildlife is also prevalent in this area, due to the presence of Spring Creek (a popular migratory route for animals in the area), which can make for hazardous nighttime driving conditions. As the road enters the town of Barrington, the road's name changes to Main Street and has an at-grade crossing at the Canadian National Railway, formerly the Elgin, Joliet and Eastern Railway, and traffic notably increases, particularly in downtown Barrington at the intersections of Illinois Route 59 (Hough Street), U.S. Route 14 (Northwest Highway), and the at-grade Union Pacific Northwest Line, especially during weekday rush periods, when Metra trains stop frequently at the nearby station. As the road continues east through the remainder of Barrington and Deer Park, it runs adjacent to more estate-style development and residential neighborhoods as well as another forested area near Deer Grove Forest Preserve in Palatine.

=== Northwest Suburban area (Quentin Road to Milwaukee Avenue) ===
The road's name changes to Lake Cook Road and as the road intersects with Quentin Road, it becomes a four-lane highway (which it remains for much of the remainder of the route) near the Deer Park Town Center commercial center and soon after intersects U.S. Route 12 near a blighted commercial strip which formally was home to a strip club, which until recent signal and intersection modifications were made, was one of the most dangerous intersections in Illinois. The roadway then crosses Deerpath Lake over a bridge, intersects Hicks Road, and then intersects the terminus of the Illinois Route 53 expressway, near a mass of apartment complexes in Palatine. After this intersection, the road is highlighted by the dense single-family neighborhoods on the south side of the roadway in Arlington Heights and the Buffalo Creek Forest Preserve on the north side of the roadway in Long Grove. As the road intersects Arlington Heights Road near neighborhood commercial plazas, it enters Buffalo Grove and becomes a four-lane boulevard, going past more residential neighborhoods, a small office center, the Buffalo Grove Municipal Complex, and Buffalo Creek, and then intersecting Buffalo Grove Road, Illinois Route 83 (McHenry Road), and Weiland Road, in rapid succession near an historic church and regional commercial plazas. A project in 2016-2018 will widen Lake Cook Road from four-lanes to six-lanes at these congested intersections. After intersecting Weiland Road, the road is then bounded by Buffalo Grove on the north and Wheeling on the south. After Lexington Drive, the roadway widens to six lanes. In this area, it goes past an apartment complex in Wheeling, crosses the Soo Line Railroad (Metra's North Central Service commuter rail line) over a bridge, goes past the Chevy Chase Golf Course in Buffalo Grove, and forms an interchange with Illinois Route 21/U.S. Route 45 (Milwaukee Avenue) near the Westin North Shore Hotel and Convention Center.

=== North Shore area (Milwaukee Avenue to Sheridan Road) ===
The road then crosses the Des Plaines River, and goes through the Potawatomi Woods Forest Preserve before entering Riverwoods, Northbrook, and Deerfield. Here, the road intersects Portwine Road, Sanders Road, and Wilmot Road and forms an interchange with Interstate 94/Interstate 294 (the Tri-State Tollway) at the Edens Spur. This area is surrounded by numerous offices, industrial buildings, and corporate headquarters including those of Baxter International, Walgreens, and Underwriters Laboratories. After Wilmot Road, the roadway continues as six lanes after a widening project complete in 2013. Near Underwriters, the road intersects Pfingsten Road and Metra's Milwaukee District North Line, where the Lake Cook Road Metra station can be found. Shortly thereafter, the road intersects Illinois Route 43 (Waukegan Road) near a retail area and goes past the Northbrook Court regional shopping mall soon after. The road reverts to a four-lane road after Waukegan Road. The road then intersects Ridge Road, a freight railroad track, Skokie Boulevard, and forms an interchange with Skokie Highway (U.S. Route 41). The road then narrows down to a two-lane road and goes past Chicago Botanic Garden, intersects Green Bay Road, intersects Metra's Union Pacific North Line at Highland Park's Braeside station near the Ravinia Festival music center, and runs concurrent with, and terminates at, Sheridan Road near the Lake Shore Country Club in Glencoe, only a few hundred feet from Lake Michigan.

== Major intersections ==
County	Location	mi	km	Destinations	Notes
McHenry–Kane county line	Algonquin	0.0	0.0	IL 62 (Algonquin Road)	Western terminus; roadway continues as Compton Drive
McHenry–Kane county line	Algonquin–Barrington Hills village line	0.2	0.32	To IL 25 (Elgin Road)	
Lake–Cook county line	Barrington	6.5	10.5	IL 59 (Hough Street, Barrington Road)	
Lake–Cook county line	Barrington	6.9	11.1	US 14 (Northwest Highway)	
Lake–Cook county line	Deer Park–Palatine line	11.5	18.5	US 12 (Rand Road)	
Lake–Cook county line	Palatine–Long Grove line	12.0	19.3	IL 53 (Hicks Road)	
Lake–Cook county line	Palatine–Long Grove line	12.6	20.3	To IL 53	Interchange
Lake	Buffalo Grove	15.6	25.1	IL 83 (McHenry Road)	
Lake–Cook county line	Buffalo Grove–Wheeling line	17.9	28.8	US 45 / IL 21 (Milwaukee Avenue)	Interchange
Lake–Cook county line	Deerfield–Northbrook line	20.0	32.2	I-94 Toll west / I-294 Toll south (Tri-State Tollway) – Chicago, Wisconsin	No westbound exit and eastbound Edens Spur entrance
Lake–Cook county line	Deerfield	22.0	35.4	IL 43 (Waukegan Road)	
Lake–Cook county line	Highland Park–Northbrook line	23.9	38.5	US 41 (Skokie Highway) to I-94 east (Edens Expressway) – Chicago, Waukegan	Interchange
Lake–Cook county line	Highland Park–Glencoe line	25.4	40.9	Sheridan Road	Eastern terminus
1.000 mi = 1.609 km; 1.000 km = 0.621 mi: Incomplete access

=== Metra commuter rail lines ===
Lake Cook Road crosses the paths of the four Metra rail lines servicing Chicago's north and northwestern suburbs.

- Union Pacific Northwest Line (at-grade intersection at Barrington station)
- North Central Service (at a bridge, located equidistant between Buffalo Grove station and Wheeling station)
- Milwaukee District North Line (at a bridge at Lake Cook Road station)
- Union Pacific North Line (at-grade intersection at Braeside station)

== Ecology ==
Lake Cook Road travels through some of the most important and ecologically diverse areas in the Chicago metropolitan area. In its western part, it goes through heavily wooded areas, and goes through Spring Creek Forest Preserve and crosses Spring Creek. In its central sections, it runs adjacent to the Deer Grove Forest Preserve and Buffalo Creek Forest Preserve and crosses Buffalo Creek. Further east, it crosses the Des Plaines River near the Potawatomi Forest Preserve. Even further east, it crosses north branches of the Chicago River and the Skokie River, runs past the Chicago Botanic Garden and ends near Lake Michigan. While this makes for very scenic views, it also presents a challenge to the region, as it works to balance environmental preservation with safety, transportation, recreation, and economic development needs.

== Economics ==
In addition to traversing natural areas, Lake Cook Road also is known for traversing some of the most economically advanced areas in the Chicago metropolitan area. Two regional malls, Deer Park Town Center and Northbrook Court, can be found along the road, which contain immense clusters of retail development in their vicinities, including big-box stores, fashion stores, upscale restaurants, and services. An additional smaller cluster of retail development can be found in Buffalo Grove. In addition, near the intersection of Lake Cook Road and the Tri-State Tollway (near Northbrook, Riverwoods, and Deerfield) is a major cluster of office and industrial development which employs thousands of people (known as an edge city), which contains the corporate headquarters for Walgreens, Baxter International, and Underwriters Laboratories, which are all found along the road. Additional employers can be found within a few miles of the road, extending north–south along Milwaukee Avenue, the Tri-State Tollway, and Skokie Highway.

Because of the property tax structure of Cook County, where commercial properties are taxed at a higher rate than residential properties, a majority of the commercial properties along Lake-Cook road are on the north side of Lake-Cook road (which is in Lake County) and a majority of residential properties are located on the south side of Lake-Cook road (which is in Cook County).
