= Deer Park Town Center =

- Location: Deer Park, Illinois, United States
- Coordinates: 42°09′41″N 88°03′15″W
- Address: 20530 N Rand Rd
- Opened: October 27, 2000; 26 years ago
- Developer: Hamilton Partners
- Manager: JLL
- Owner: SITE Centers
- Num. of stores: 62
- Num. of anchor tenants: 8
- Floors: 1
- Website: Official website

Deer Park Town Center is an upscale lifestyle center in the northwest Chicago suburb of Deer Park, Illinois, situated at the southwest corner of U.S. Highway 12 (Rand Road) and Long Grove Road, north of Lake Cook Road. It opened on October 27, 2000, and is a one-level, outdoor lifestyle shopping center.

The shopping center consists of over 70 retailers and restaurants, spread across 407,293 square feet (37,838 m2) and generates considerable traffic from the northwest suburbs, primarily in the Barrington, Lake Zurich, Long Grove, Palatine, Kildeer and Buffalo Grove communities, and from further places too.

== Anchors ==
- Century Theatres
- Barnes & Noble
- Crate & Barrel
- Gap
- Banana Republic
- Pottery Barn
- Apple Store

== Restaurants ==
- California Pizza Kitchen
- Stoney River Legendary Steaks
- Panera Bread
- Starbucks
- Noodles & Company
- Cold Stone Creamery
- Teavana
- Red Robin
