= Jack Sanborn =

American football player (born 2000)

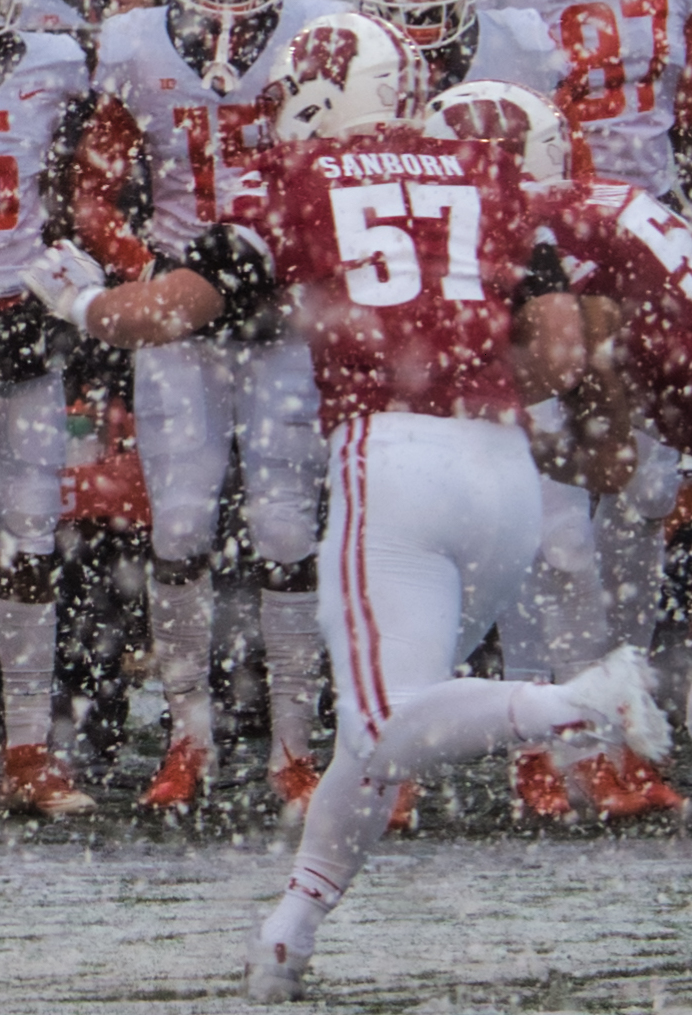
- Sanborn with the Wisconsin Badgers in 2018

No. 57 – Chicago Bears
- Position: Linebacker
- Roster status: Active

Personal information
- Born: July 29, 2000 (age 26); Lake Zurich, Illinois, U.S.
- Listed height: 6 ft 2 in (1.88 m)
- Listed weight: 234 lb (106 kg)

Career information
- High school: Lake Zurich
- College: Wisconsin (2018–2021)
- NFL draft: 2022: undrafted

Career history
- Chicago Bears (2022–2024); Dallas Cowboys (2025); Chicago Bears (2026–present)

Awards and highlights
- Brian Piccolo Award (2022); First-team All-Big Ten (2021); Third-team All-Big Ten (2020)

Career NFL statistics as of Week 6, 2026
- Total tackles: 202
- Sacks: 4.5
- Fumble recoveries: 1
- Interceptions: 1
- Pass deflections: 6
- Stats at Pro Football Reference

Jack Sanborn (born July 29, 2000) is an American professional football linebacker for the Chicago Bears of the National Football League (NFL). He played college football for the Wisconsin Badgers.

After not being selected in the 2022 NFL draft, he signed by the Bears as an undrafted free agent. He spent his first three seasons in Chicago before playing a year with the Dallas Cowboys.

== Early life ==
Sanborn grew up in Deer Park, Illinois. He was raised by his mother following the death of his father, Paul Sanborn, when he was four years old. Sanborn attended Lake Zurich High School in Lake Zurich, Illinois. As a senior, he played in the Illinois State Football Championship and after the season, was named the Pioneer Press Defensive Player of the Year after recording 120 tackles and three sacks as a senior. Sanborn had 296 tackles and 13 sacks in three varsity seasons at Lake Zurich. He was rated a four-star recruit and committed to play college football at Wisconsin over several other Power Five offers.

== College career ==
Sanborn played in 11 games as a freshman. He was Wisconsin's leading tackler in sophomore season with 80 along with nine tackles for loss and 5.5 sacks. As a junior, Sanborn led the Badgers for a second straight season with 52 tackles and had four tackles for loss, one sack, one forced fumble and one interception and was named third-team All-Big Ten Conference. He was named first-team All-Big Ten as a senior after recording 91 tackles, 16 tackles for loss, and five sacks. Following the end of the season, Sanborn announced that he would be entering the 2022 NFL draft.

=== College statistics ===
Season	Team	Games		Tackles						Int & Fum			
Season	Team	GP	GS	Solo	Ast	Cmb	TfL	Yds	Sck	Int	PD	FF	FR
2018	Wisconsin	11	0	4	3	7	0.0	0	0.0	0	1	1	0
2019	Wisconsin	14	14	50	30	80	9.0	44	5.5	3	3	1	1
2020	Wisconsin	7	7	31	21	52	4.0	13	1.0	1	0	1	0
2021	Wisconsin	13	13	45	46	91	16.0	55	5.0	0	0	0	1
Career		45	34	130	100	230	29.0	112	11.5	4	4	3	2

== Professional career ==
Pre-draft measurables
Height	Weight	Arm length	Hand span	Wingspan	40-yard dash	10-yard split	20-yard split	20-yard shuttle	Three-cone drill	Vertical jump	Broad jump	Bench press
6 ft 1 5/8 in (1.87 m)	234 lb (106 kg)	31 1/2 in (0.80 m)	9 5/8 in (0.24 m)	6 ft 2 1/8 in (1.88 m)	4.73 s	1.59 s	2.72 s	4.34 s	6.96 s	34.5 in (0.88 m)	9 ft 6 in (2.90 m)	20 reps
All values from NFL Combine/Pro Day

=== Chicago Bears ===
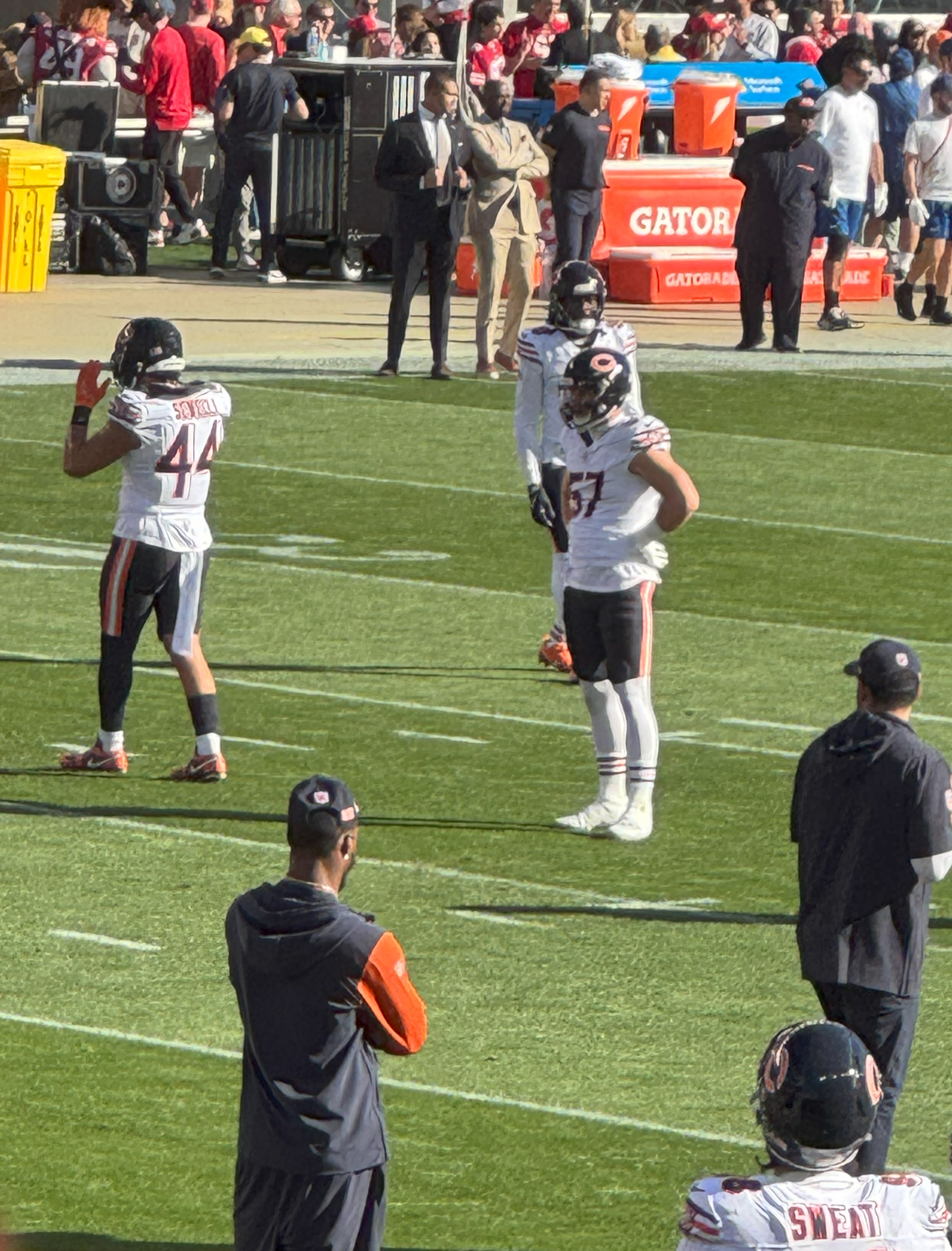
Sanborn (center) during pre-game warm-ups in 2024

Sanborn signed with the Chicago Bears as an undrafted free agent on May 6, 2022. Sanborn eventually made the Bears' 53-man roster for the 2022 season. He became the Bears' starting middle linebacker following the trade of Roquan Smith. On November 13, during his first career start, Sanborn recorded two sacks and 12 total tackles during a 31–30 loss to the Detroit Lions. On December 18, Sanborn suffered a season-ending ankle injury in the Bears' 25–20 loss to the Philadelphia Eagles, and was placed on injured reserve on December 20. He made six starts for the Bears in 2022, where he recorded 64 total tackles and two sacks. Pro Football Focus (PFF) named Sanborn to their 2022 All-Rookie Team following the regular season.

The Bears signed Tremaine Edmunds and T. J. Edwards to reinforce their linebacker corps in the ensuing offseason. Sanborn transitioned to a strong-side linebacker. He started all 17 games of the 2023 Chicago Bears season, where he registered 65 tackles, one interception, one sack, and seven tackles for loss. He was named to ESPN's 2023 ESPN "All-Youngster Team", a collection of players 24 years old and younger. In 2024, Sanborn played in all 17 games while starting in only 3. Sanborn had 35 tackles, 1.5 sacks, and 2 tackles for loss. The Bears announced after the season they would not be tendering Sanborn making him a free agent.

=== Dallas Cowboys ===
On March 12, 2025, Sanborn signed with the Dallas Cowboys. The Cowboys had hired Matt Eberflus, who was Sanborn's head coach in Chicago, as their defensive coordinator as well as former Bears linebackers coach Dave Borgonzi. In Week 5 against the New York Jets, he suffered a concussion which caused him to miss the next game against the Carolina Panthers. He played mostly on special teams in Week 7 against the Washington Commanders and suffered a groin injury. He was placed on injured reserve on November 3 due to a groin injury. Although he was acquired due to his familiarity with Eberflus' defensive scheme, he struggled to make an impact. He appeared in 6 games (5 starts), posting 38 tackles, one tackle for loss, one quarterback pressure and one pass breakup.

=== Chicago Bears (second stint) ===
Sanborn returned to the Chicago Bears on a one-year contract on March 18, 2026. He was released by Chicago as a part of final roster cuts on August 30. Two days later, Sanborn re–signed with the Bears after Coby Bryant was placed on injured reserve.

=== NFL statistics ===
Legend
**Bold**	Career high

Year	Team	Games		Tackles					Interceptions						Fumbles	
Year	Team	GP	GS	Cmb	Solo	Ast	Sck	TFL	PD	Int	Yds	Avg	Lng	TD	FF	FR
2022	CHI	14	6	64	**50**	14	**2.0**	5	0	0	0	0.0	0	0	0	**1**
2023	CHI	**17**	**10**	**65**	43	**22**	1.0	**7**	2	**1**	**42**	**42.0**	**42**	0	0	0
2024	CHI	**17**	3	35	17	18	1.5	2	**3**	0	0	0	0	0	0	0
2025	DAL	6	5	34	16	18	0.0	1	1	0	0	0	0	0	0	0
2026	CHI	6	0	4	3	1	0.0	0	0	0	0	0	0	0	0	0
Career		60	24	202	129	73	4.5	15	6	1	42	42.0	42	0	0	1

== Personal life ==
Sanborn's father played college football as an offensive lineman for the University of Oregon. His younger brother, Bryan, also played linebacker at Wisconsin.
