= Matt Blanchard =

American football player (born 1989)

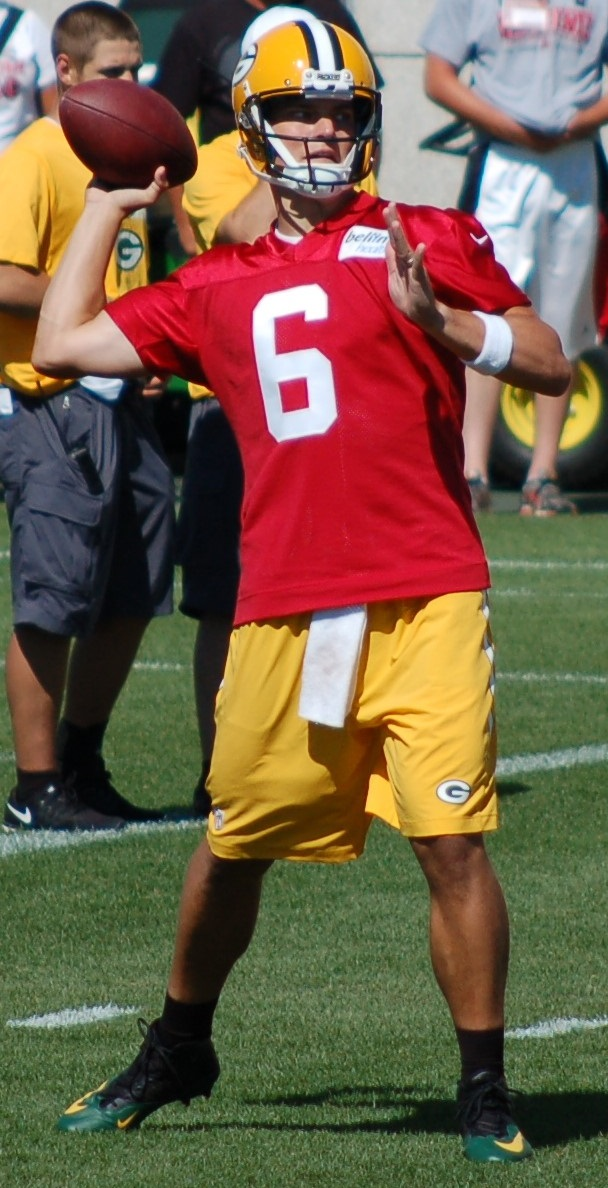
- Blanchard with the Green Bay Packers in 2015

Profile
- Position: Quarterback

Personal information
- Born: March 21, 1989 (age 37); Lake Zurich, Illinois, U.S.
- Listed height: 6 ft 3 in (1.91 m)
- Listed weight: 225 lb (102 kg)

Career information
- High school: Lake Zurich
- College: Northern Michigan (2007–2008); Wisconsin–Whitewater (2009–2011)
- NFL draft: 2012: undrafted

Career history
- Chicago Bears (2012–2013)*; Carolina Panthers (2013–2014); Green Bay Packers (2015)*; Cleveland Browns (2015)*; Indianapolis Colts (2015)*; Chicago Bears (2015–2016)*
- * Offseason or practice squad member only
- Stats at Pro Football Reference

Matthew Ryan Blanchard (born March 21, 1989) is an American former professional football player who was a quarterback in the National Football League (NFL). He played college football for the Wisconsin–Whitewater Warhawks, and signed with the Chicago Bears after going undrafted in the 2012 NFL draft. Blanchard was also a member of the Carolina Panthers, Green Bay Packers, Cleveland Browns, and Indianapolis Colts.

== Early life ==
Blanchard attended Lake Zurich High School, where he was teammates with Anthony Castonzo.

== College career ==
Blanchard played his most notable years of college football at a Division III university University of Wisconsin-Whitewater. Before his years at UW-Whitewater, he played two years (one as an injured redshirting freshman) at a Division II University, Northern Michigan University on a partial athletic scholarship. As an All-American quarterback, Blanchard maintained an accurate 70.4 percent average in pass-completion, resulting in a total of 44 touchdown passes in the duration of his career as a starter at UW-Whitewater. He went undefeated at UW-Whitewater all three years on the team, earning three national championships, although Blanchard sat out one of the championships with an injury. After completing his college career, he was invited to play at the Players All-Star Classic.

== Professional career ==
=== Chicago Bears ===
Blanchard was signed by the Chicago Bears after being invited to the team's rookie mini camp in May 2012. After the preseason, in which he completed 9 of 16 passes for 94 yards with an interception and a 47.4 passer rating, he earned a spot on the 8-man practice squad. The Bears signed Blanchard to the practice squad on September 1, where he could be developed, or activated to the 53-man roster in an emergency situation. Blanchard was released on December 4. On January 7, 2013, Blanchard was brought back by the Bears. In the second preseason game against the San Diego Chargers, Blanchard fractured his left knuckle, and Jordan Palmer was signed to take his place. On August 27, Blanchard and the Bears reached an injury settlement, and as a result, was free to sign with any team once the settlement expired, and could only return with the Bears after Week 10 of the 2013 season.

=== Carolina Panthers ===
Blanchard was signed to the Carolina Panthers practice squad on October 30, 2013, and after the season ended, Blanchard signed a futures contract with the Panthers. Following a preseason concussion which landed him on injured reserve, he was released by the Panthers injured reserve list on December 9, 2014.

=== Green Bay Packers ===
Following an offseason workout with the Green Bay Packers, Coach Mike McCarthy was impressed with Blanchard and asked him, "Why the hell don't you have a job?" Blanchard signed with the Packers on April 15, 2015, but was released on September 1.

=== Cleveland Browns ===
Blanchard was signed with the Cleveland Browns practice squad on September 15, 2015. After two weeks, Blanchard was released on October 1.

=== Indianapolis Colts ===
On October 20, 2015, Blanchard signed to the Indianapolis Colts practice squad, reuniting him with former teammate Anthony Castonzo. On November 2, the Colts faced Blanchard's former team, the Carolina Panthers on Monday Night Football. Due to his size and familiarity with the Carolina offense, Blanchard was used to mimic quarterback Cam Newton in practice. He was released on November 10.

=== Chicago Bears (second stint) ===
Blanchard was resigned to the Bears practice squad for the final four weeks on the 2015 season on December 8. Despite an AFC team attempting to sign him to their active roster for the final game of the regular season, Blanchard elected to remain with the Bears on the practice squad, but received a one-week pay raise as if he were on the 53 player roster. Following this, Blanchard signed a futures contract with the Bears. Following the acquisitions of quarterbacks Brian Hoyer on April 30, and undrafted rookie Dalyn Williams out of Rutgers on June 9, Blanchard, who no longer was practice squad eligible for the upcoming season, was released.

== Personal life ==
Blanchard graduated from Lake Zurich High School in June, 2007. He attended Northern Michigan University for two football seasons, red-shirting as a freshman with a broken right thumb. In the spring semester of 2009, Blanchard transferred to the University of Wisconsin–Whitewater. In December 2011, Blanchard received his Bachelor's degree from UW-Whitewater, and has since received several business related certifications.

Blanchard received his Masters of Business Administration (MBA) in 2020 and Masters of Business Analytics in 2021 from Indiana University.

Blanchard lives in Middleton, Wisconsin with his wife, Abbey, daughter, Noa, and son, Parker. Matthew is currently the Director of Sales Operations for AE Business Solutions, a mid-western IT systems integration and consulting company.
