= Community Unit School District 95 =

School district in Illinois, United States

Lake Zurich Community Unit School District 95

Address
- 832 South Rand Road Lake Zurich, Illinois; United States

District information
- Grades: K–12
- Superintendent: Dr. Kelley Gallt

Other information
- Website: www.lz95.org

Community Unit School District 95 is the school district that covers Lake Zurich, Illinois, US, which is located in the Northwest suburbs of Chicago, Illinois. The towns that make up the District include Lake Zurich, Kildeer, Deer Park, Hawthorn Woods and unincorporated Forest Lake and North Barrington.

District 95 is a public schooling system made up of eight schools, which consist of five elementary schools, two middle schools, and one high school. The district is managed by a seven-member board of education. The superintendent is Dr. Kelley Gallt.

== Elementary schools ==
School's Name	Principal	Assistant Principal	Mascot
Isaac Fox	Kelly Olivero	Stephan Bild (interim)	Foxes
May Whitney	Maria Moreano	Dana Ladenburger & Jory Snowden	Wildcats
Sarah Adams	Colleen Conway	Ellen Wilfinger	Bulldogs
Seth Paine	Kevin Olsen	Jennifer Kallaus	Dragons
Spencer Loomis	Marie Rothermel	Kristin Herrick	Mustangs

A sixth elementary school, Charles Quentin, closed on June 5, 2009. Claudia Mall was the principal.

== Middle schools ==
School's Name	Principal	Assistant Principal	Mascot
Lake Zurich Middle School North (LZMSN)	Brooke Crowley	Ashley Buchman	Wolves
Lake Zurich Middle School South (LZMSS)	Anthony Dengler	Leslie Manypenny	Eagles

== High school ==
School's Name	Principal	Assistant Principals	Mascot
Lake Zurich High School	Dr. John Walsh	Assessment, Academics & Innovation: Zachery Gimm Student Life & Operations: Dr. Andrew Lambert Student Services: Cara Obrochta	Bears
