= Lake Zurich High School =

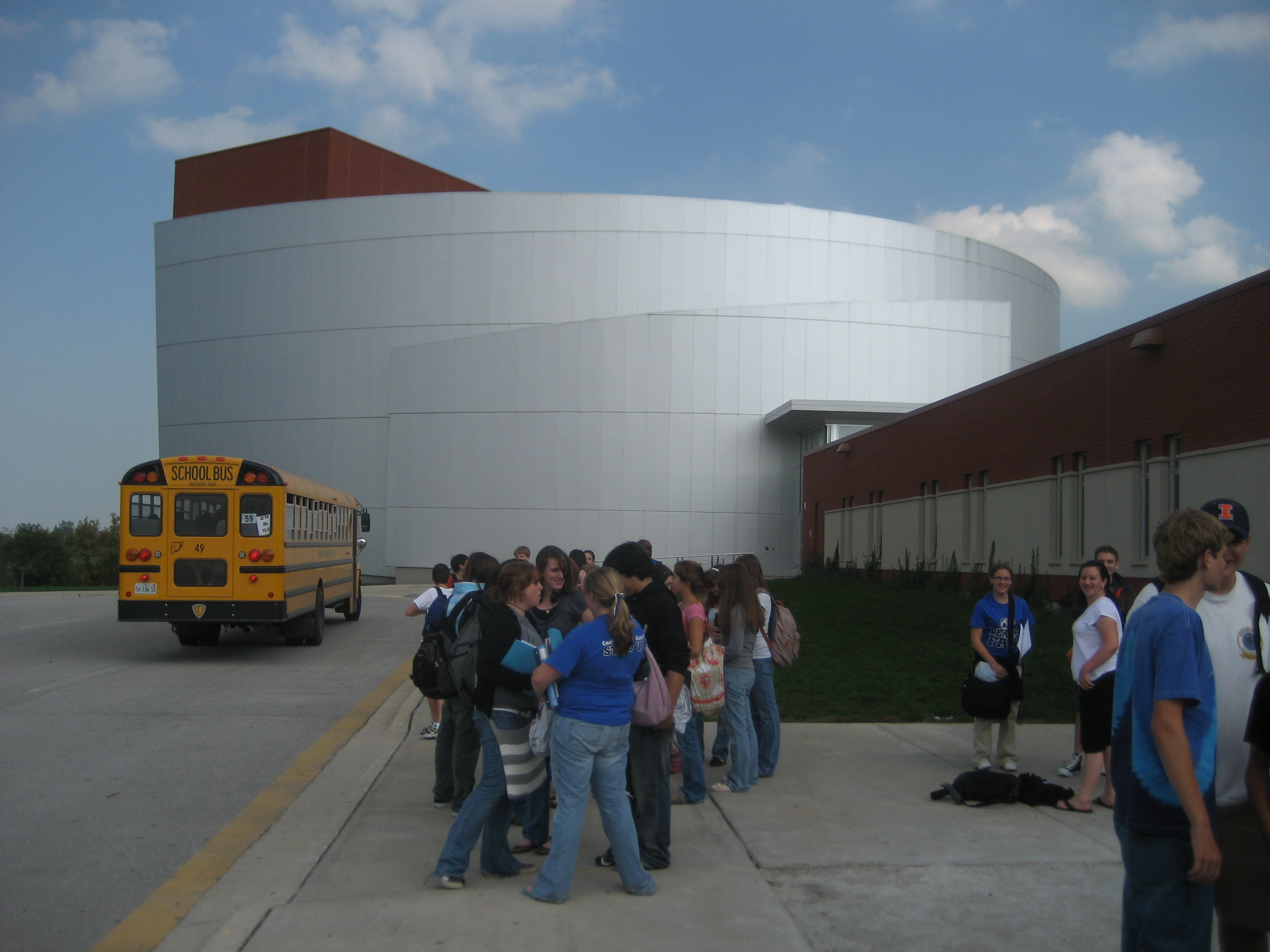
- Performing Arts Center at LZHS

Location
- 300 Church Street; Lake Zurich, Illinois 60047; United States; 42°12′16″N 88°05′03″W

Information
- School type: public, secondary
- Opened: 1926
- School district: 95
- CEEB code: 142530
- Principal: John Walsh
- Teaching staff: 125.20 (FTE)
- Grades: 9-12
- Gender: coed
- Enrollment: 1,802 (2023-2024)
- Student to teacher ratio: 14.39
- Campus type: suburban
- Colors: Royal blue and white
- Athletics conference: North Suburban
- Team name: Bears
- Newspaper: Bear Facts
- Yearbook: Elyte
- Website: Official website

Lake Zurich High School, LZHS, or Lake Zurich Senior High School is a public four-year high school located in Lake Zurich, Illinois, a northwest suburb of Chicago, in the United States. It is part of Community Unit School District 95, which is home to five elementary schools and two middle schools, primarily taking students from Lake Zurich Middle School North and Lake Zurich Middle School South, but it also takes students from local parochial schools such as St. Francis de Sales. Students from most of Lake Zurich, Hawthorn Woods, portions of Kildeer, Deer Park, North Barrington, and unincorporated areas such as Forest Lake and Echo Lake attend Lake Zurich High School.

== History ==
Lake Zurich High School first opened its doors to students in 1926 as Ela-Vernon High School, serving Ela and Vernon Townships in Lake County, Illinois. In 1964, area residents built a second high school, which was to be called Ela-Vernon East. A series of disagreements between Vernon Township residents and Ela Township residents led to the split of the school district, and Stevenson High School opened in nearby Lincolnshire, drawing students from the eastern half of Ela Township and all of Vernon Township. As a result of the split, a rivalry existed between the schools, and each fall the football teams competed for what was known as "The Cannon". The Cannon was a miniature steel replica of a real cannon, and fired a blank shotgun shell when teams entered the field, and or scored a touchdown. The Cannon was retired in 1982, after Stevenson and Lake Zurich discontinued their football rivalry, as a result of differing enrollment and different athletic conference affiliations. Lake Zurich won the last game involving the cannon in 1982. Students from most of Lake Zurich, Hawthorn Woods portions of Kildeer, Deer Park, North Barrington, and unincorporated areas such as Forest Lake and Echo Lake attend Lake Zurich High School.

== Student life ==
=== Athletics ===
Lake Zurich competes in the North Suburban Conference and is a member of the Illinois High School Association (IHSA). The school's teams are stylized Bears.

The school has won 4 IHSA state championships, one in football (2007–08), one in cheerleading (2010–11) and the dance team has won two back to back state championships (2018/2019). The school has also won the Illinois State Lacrosse Cup (2012–13).

In 2006, the school installed artificial turf for its stadium, and again in the summer of 2014.

In early 2017, the families of two football players filed lawsuits alleging that they had been hazed in a way that included forced sex acts. The scandal caused the resignation of several people involved with the team, including the athletic director and the head coach. Without admitting wrongdoing, the district eventually settled with the alleged victims.

=== Activities ===
The Lake Zurich High School's (LZHS) Drama Department performance of "Urinetown" was selected by USA Weekend Magazine as a state winner (Illinois) for "Best High School Musicals in America". The cast and crew performed the play twice January 5–6, 2007 at the University of Illinois during the Illinois High School Theatre Festival. Other shows performed by Lake Zurich at the Festival include "The Wedding Singer" in 2009, "The Diviners" in 2005, and "Love/Sick" in 2017.

LZHS also has band, orchestra, and choir programs. Students participating in the 2013 IHSA Solo/Ensemble Contest earned 2nd place overall in class AA, with 675 points.

== Notable alumni ==
- Matt Blanchard, former American football quarterback
- Anthony Castonzo, former American football offensive tackle
- Charles M. Eaton Jr, a judge on the Fulton County Superior Court in the Atlanta Judicial Circuit.
- Jack Lynn, former American football linebacker
- Martin Redlicki, tennis player
- Jack Sanborn, American football linebacker for the Chicago Bears
- Matt Svanson, pitcher in the St. Louis Cardinals organization
- Hunter Welcing, college football tight end for the Ohio State Buckeyes
- Hannah Welton, drummer for 3rdeyegirl
