= Hunter Welcing =

American football player

No. 84 – Ohio State Buckeyes
- Position: Tight end
- Class: Fifth Year

Personal information
- Listed height: 6 ft 3 in (1.91 m)
- Listed weight: 248 lb (112 kg)

Career information
- High school: Lake Zurich (Lake Zurich, Illinois)
- College: Northwestern (2020–2025); Ohio State (2026–present)
- Stats at ESPN

Hunter Welcing is an American college football tight end for the Ohio State Buckeyes. He previously played for the Northwestern Wildcats.

== Early life ==
Welcing grew up playing ice hockey and dreamed of playing in the National Hockey League from a young age. He later attended Lake Zurich High School in Lake Zurich, Illinois. After participating in the football team’s summer conditioning program to socialize with his friends and stay in shape for hockey, Welcing decided to join the football team his sophomore year. He spent the season on the junior varsity team, though he "quickly earned the reputation of being the guy you didn’t want on the other side of the drill."

Welcing had a breakout junior season, earning all-state honorable mention from The News-Gazette and garnering all-conference honors. However, he tore his anterior cruciate ligament (ACL) while playing in a seven-on-seven tournament the following offseason, forcing him to miss the start of his senior season. In five games played, he logged 200 receiving yards and four touchdowns.

=== Recruiting ===
Welcing was rated as a consensus three-star recruit. He was ranked as the 11th, 23rd, and 29th best recruit in Illinois by ESPN, 247Sports, and Rivals.com, respectively. In March 2019, Welcing verbally committed to playing college football at Northwestern. His only other offer was from Western Michigan. Welcing said that he "always had Northwestern as [his] top school," adding that "touring the facilities, and getting to know the coaches, environment, and system that they have there" helped him make his decision. He signed with the Wildcats during the early signing period in December.

== College career ==
As a freshman in 2020, Welcing did not play any games. The following season, he played five games and was redshirted. Welcing then took a medical redshirt in 2022 after tearing his right ACL for the second time. He appeared in eight games in 2023, primarily in a special teams role. Welcing played in all 12 games in 2024. He recorded his first career reception, a 20-yard catch against Eastern Illinois. Welcing stepped into a larger role during the 2025 season. He appeared in all 13 games, making 10 starts, and tallied 28 receptions for 296 yards and two touchdowns. It was the most receiving yards by a Wildcats tight end since Garrett Dickerson. Welcing earned All-Big Ten Conference honorable mention. After receiving feedback from NFL scouts, he entered the NCAA transfer portal to return to college for an additional season. Welcing was rated as a four- and three-star transfer recruit by 247Sports and Rivals.com, respectively. On January 12, 2026, he committed to transferring to Ohio State.

== Personal life ==
Welcing earned his bachelor’s and master’s degrees at Northwestern.
