= Seth Paine =

American abolitionist, activist, businessman, and banker (1816–1872)

Seth Paine (21 April 1816 - 7 June 1872) was an American abolitionist, activist, and spiritualist banker who founded the Bank of Chicago, also known as the "Spiritualist Bank" which he started with the help of spiritualist Ira B. Eddy. Paine also helped found Lake Zurich, Illinois.

== Biography ==
Seth Paine was born in Vermont on April 21, 1816. His grandfather was a preacher who fought against what he saw as hypocrisy by Congregationalists in Vermont. Paine was an committed abolitionist who played a role in the underground railroad in northeastern Illinois. Paine also was apparently involved with the Pinkerton Agency's protection of Abraham Lincoln, and later worked to free slaves held in jail in Washington, D.C. in 1862. In the 1840's he helped found the town of Lake Zurich, Illinois, where he constructed a large building to house the homeless. Paine was inspired by the work of Charles Fourier.

In 1851, Illinois enacted a free banking law which allowed for independent banks to circulate their own certificates. The Bank of Chicago was founded in 1852 by Seth Paine, with spiritualist Ira B. Eddy serving as the bank's President. Eddy also provided the needed capital to start the bank. Paine was against increasing capitalistic practices at the time such as loaning money to pay debts, speculation, futures trading, and money hoarding; and saw his bank engaging in exclusively "aiding the natural exchange between the producer and consumer" as he wrote. He also refused to loan money to "aid in making or selling intoxicating liquors, or tobacco in any of its forms," or hurting animals, particularly the Chicago pork industry, which offended Paine as a vegetarian. Paine also supported women's rights and employment, and his first cashier, among a number of women mediums he employed, was his wife Fanny. He proudly advertised his employment of women, and planned to open a school for teaching women.

The bank used spirit mediums as cashiers and financial advisors who claimed to act on the advice of deceased men such as U.S. Presidents George Washington and Andrew Jackson. Based on this advice, the Bank of Chicago created a scandal in 1853 when they refused to redeem bank notes. According to Henry Fowler, the leading journalist who exposed the bank in the Chicago Tribune, Paine and Eddy would "submit to be led by silly women" who effectively ran the bank through their spirit advice. The medium's spirit advice included not giving money in the form of loans or redemptions to smokers, drinkers, people who harmed animals, or who engaged in businesses such as land speculation or capitalistic acquisition. Spiritualist services were also offered in "Harmony Hall" on the bank's upper floor every Sunday.

Aside from his spiritualist influence, Paine was influenced by his Christian beliefs which he combined with spiritualism to such an extent that he called the Bank of Chicago's work "Christian Banking" and named his short lived periodical which he used to defend himself in the press The Christian Banker. He wrote in the inaugural issue "We believe that the only way in which anything can be accomplished for the good of men, is to carry religion in life and business—to make business a religion," and demanded that his cashiers be in agreement with his positions on social issues and religion.

In 1853, a group of rival bankers, led by George Smith and J. Young Scammon organized a bank run in order to put the Bank of Chicago out of business, capitalizing on anti-spiritualist sentiment and accusing the bank of both fraud and blasphemy. According to David Walker, Paine had recently charged Smith and Scammon with "a combination of greed, usury, speculation, shinplastering, wildcatting, monopoly, and market manipulation." According to Fowler's exposé in the Chicago Tribune, some people who would go to withdraw money from the bank would be called names such as "unclean," "scoundrel," "hog," and other epithets by the cashiers, while others had no problem withdrawing their funds. The deciding factor seemed to be what information the spirits gave to the leading medium, Mrs. Herrick, regarding the client's morals; although Ira Eddy later testified that the policy was to prioritize redemptions for people of color and women.

Meanwhile Eddy had been accused of insanity by his wife, and in the resulting court cases Paine was arrested and refused to post bail, refusing to recognize the authority of non-spiritualists. Paine was later released with the help of his wife and friends.

After the bank's failure, The Christian Banker was moved to Lake Zurich and renamed The Lake Zurich Banker, where Paine advocated for various reform movements. Paine also started a settlement home for women in Chicago, which lasted for years after his death and may have inspired Jane Addams to create the Hull House. Paine started The Union Store, a co-op in which customers were shareholders, but the business failed because of debt issues. He also continued to work for the abolitionist cause and risked his life digging tunnels under his businesses for escaped slaves.

Paine died on June 7, 1872 and is buried in Graceland Cemetery. Seth Paine Elementary School in Lake Zurich is named after him.

== Sources ==
- Fowler, Henry (10 February 1853). "The Bank of Chicago and Spiritualism". Chicago Tribune.
- Harper, William Hudson; Ravell, Charles H. (1907). Fifty Years of Banking in Chicago. The Merchants' Loan and Trust Company.
- Paine, Seth (5 January 1853). "Woman's Rights". Christian Banker. p. 4.
- Rutter, David (1 April 2020). "In Search of Seth Paine". Country. JWC Media. Archived from the original on 2 July 2021.
- Walker, David (2025). "Banking". In Seales, Chad E. (ed.). The Routledge Handbook of Religion and American Culture. Routledge. pp. 93–110. ISBN 978-1-003-35735-3.
