= Northbrook Court =

Shopping mall in Northbrook, Illinois

Northbrook Court Mall
- Center Court
- Location: Northbrook, Illinois, United States
- Coordinates: 42°9′1″N 87°49′1″W
- Address: 1515 Lake Cook Road
- Opened: March 17, 1976; 50 years ago
- Developer: Homart Development Co.
- Manager: GGP
- Owner: GGP (partial)
- Architect: Architectonics, Inc.
- Num. of stores: 104 (at peak) 21 (now)
- Num. of anchor tenants: 3 (formerly 4; 2 open, 1 demolished)
- Floor area: 1,012,000 sq ft (94,000 m^{2})
- Floors: 2 (4 in AMC and a staff mezzanine and basement in Neiman Marcus)
- Parking: 5,100 spaces
- Public transit: Pace
- Website: www.northbrookcourt.com

Northbrook Court is a shopping mall in Northbrook, Illinois with a collection of stores serving the North Shore suburbs of Chicago. Located on 130 acres (0.53 km^{2}) of land, the mall currently features the traditional retailer Neiman Marcus as well as a number of prominent specialty retailers. The mall is in the midst of a perpetually postponed $750 million update and enhanced development which was unveiled in April 2023.

This mall also features a 14-screen Dine-In AMC Theatres on the south side of the mall. It is managed and co-owned by GGP, a subsidiary of Brookfield Properties since 2018.

== History ==
Northbrook Court originally opened in 1976 with Lord & Taylor, Neiman Marcus, and Sears. I. Magnin opened later on. Homart Development Company a subsidiary of Sears financed the project. Architectonics, Inc. was the architect. The mall featured sculptures created by Charles Owen Perry which were named after historic figures in scientific research (Archimedes, da Vinci, Mercator and Cassini).

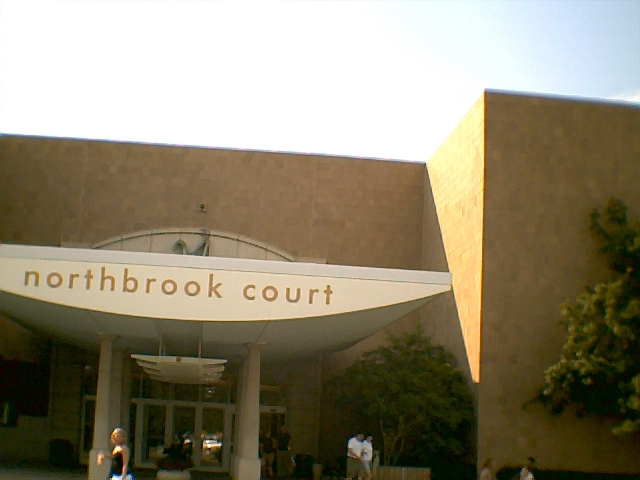
Entrance to the mall in the mid-2000s

Sears closed in 1983 due to the company determining that the store's market too closely overlapped that of the nearby stores at Hawthorn Mall and Golf Mill Mall. It was converted into a prototype for JCPenney that same year, and then torn down in 1995 for a new Marshall Field's (later Macy's). In 1991, I. Magnin closed and was replaced by General Cinema which opened on November 22, 1996, with 14 auditoriums. It was converted into an AMC Theatres in 2002. A free-standing Crate & Barrel home store on the northwest corner of the mall opened that same year. Crate & Barrel used to be where Arhaus is.

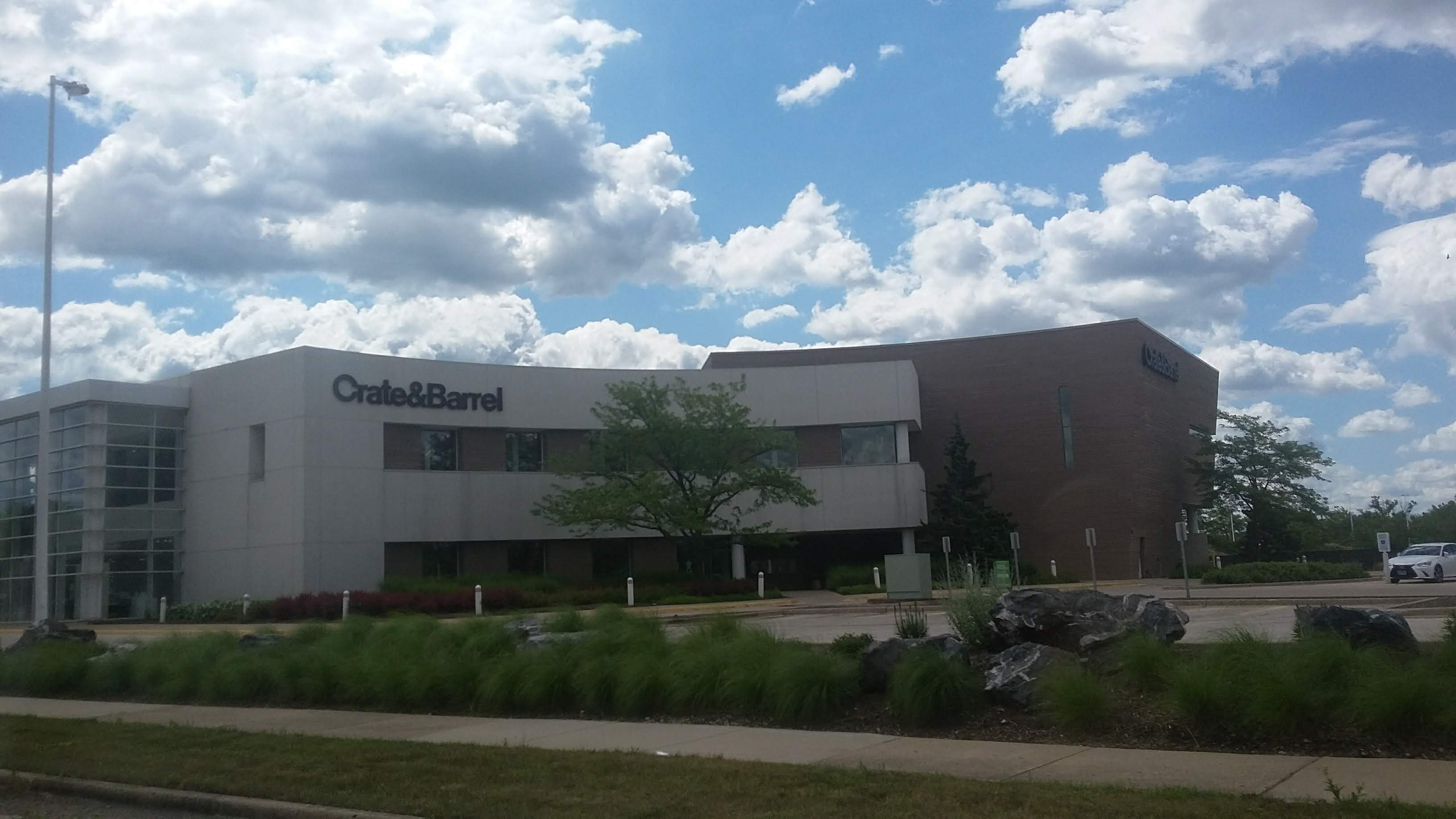
The mall's free-standing Crate & Barrel

In 2007, Northbrook Court took down its traditional food court for a unique prototype, which has now failed. Most of the space was reallocated to Forever 21, leaving 4 spots for restaurants, originally housing Chinese Gourmet Express, Tony & Bruno’s, Subway, and Corner Bakery Cafe. A few restaurants came and went over the years and the only restaurant from this original group left is Tony & Bruno’s. The mall now features six sit-down spaces with four occupied currently: NM Cafe (originally named The Zodiac) (inside Neiman Marcus), California Pizza Kitchen, Di Pescara, and an outparcel P.F. Chang’s. The Claim Company and Stir Crazy closed and/or moved.

California Pizza Kitchen opened its doors on Northbrook Court's north side for the first time in August 2010. On May 16, 2014, Arhaus officially opened at the mall's east side.

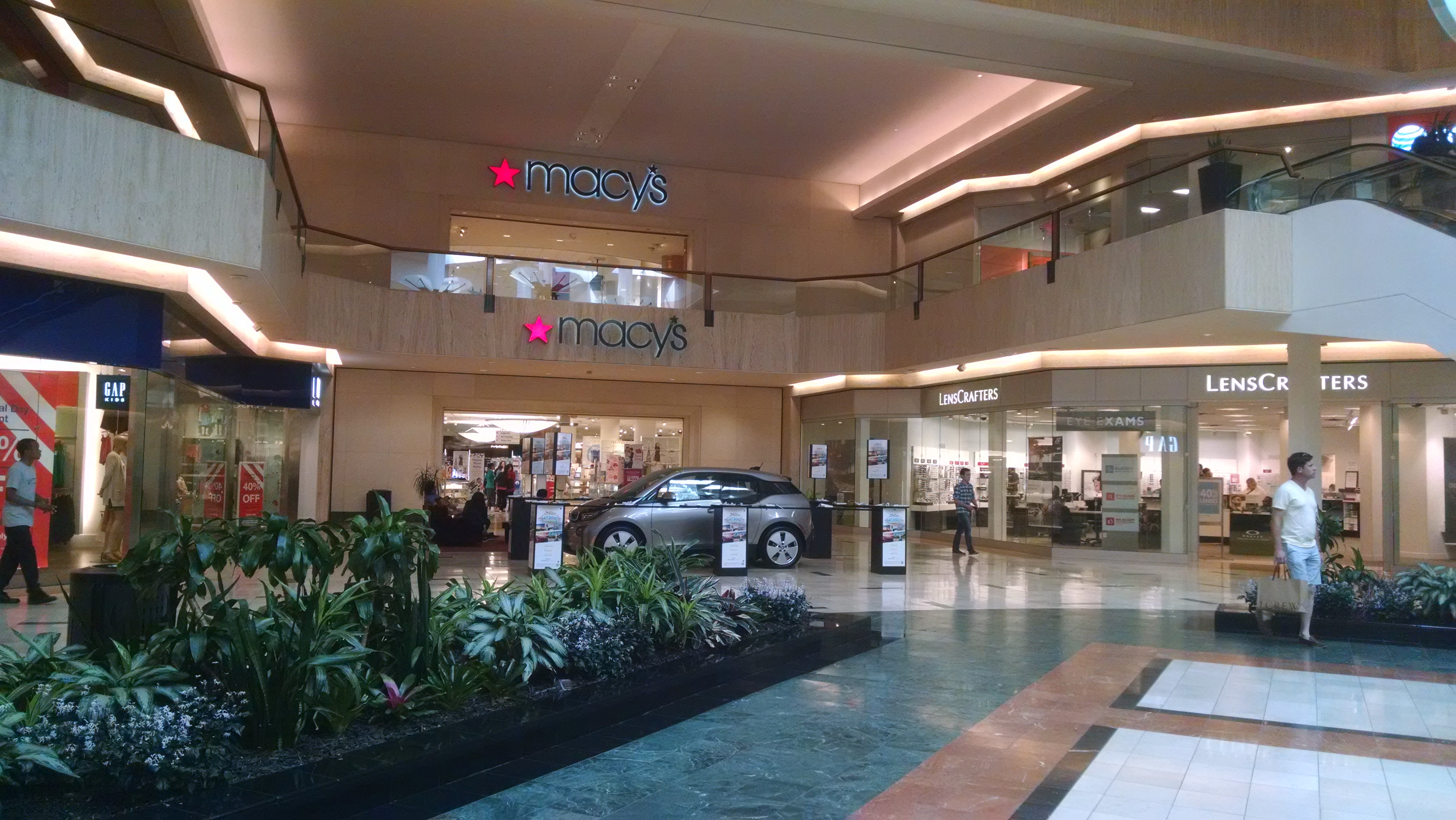
The mall’s former Macy's, as seen from the first floor

On May 11, 2019, Macy's announced the closure of their anchor store, which was demolished for redevelopment.

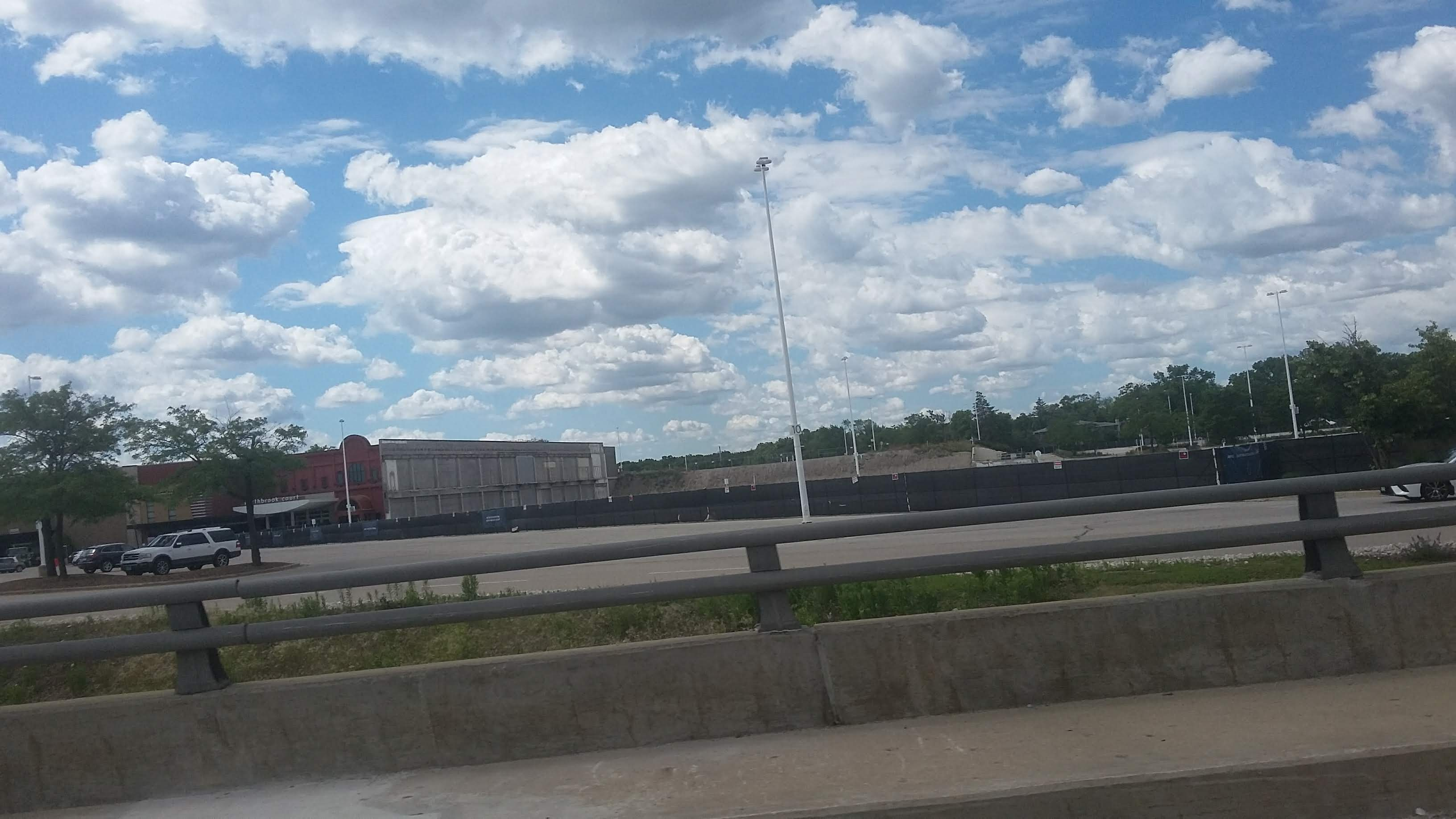
Location of Former Macys

On August 27, 2020, Lord & Taylor announced the permanent closure of all of its stores, as a result of the economic impact of the COVID-19 pandemic.

In late April 2023, Brookfield Properties showed the new redevelopment plan, which included outdoor shopping in the current Neiman Marcus parking lot, and mixed-use where Macy’s was. No official start date has been announced and redevelopment has yet to begin. In June 2023, the mall was declared blighted and a new 1% sales tax was introduced to pay for improvements. The following years saw continued store closures, with the redevelopment plan still on hold.

On February 18, 2025, Apple announced plans to close its store after two decades. The store closed on April 26, 2025. Along with the closure of the Apple Store, several other notable retailers closed in 2025, such as Lululemon, Forever 21, Sephora, Auntie Anne’s, Louis Vuitton, and the Lego Store. The Lego Store moved to Old Orchard in December 2025.

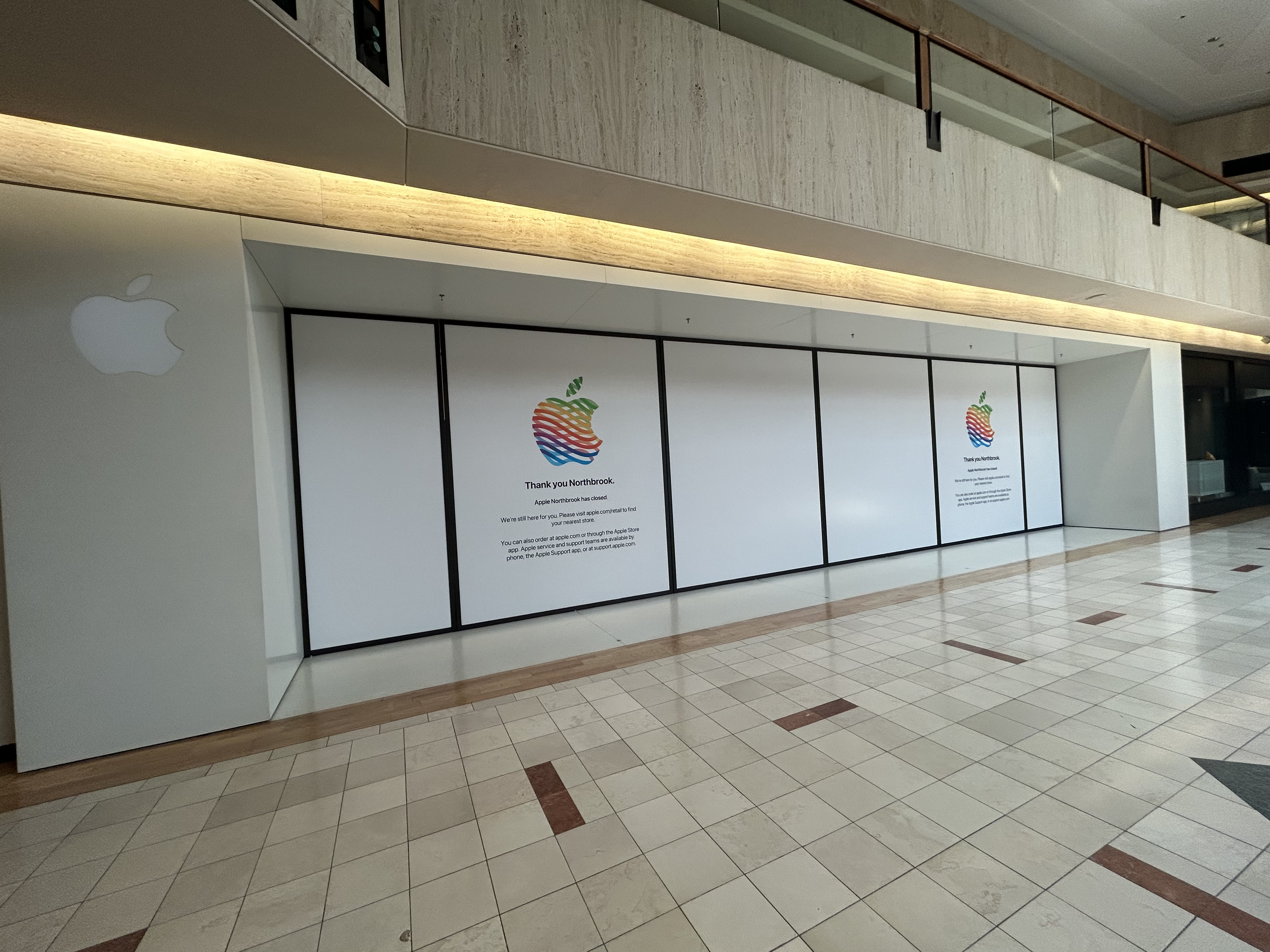
The shuttered Apple Store

== Anchors ==
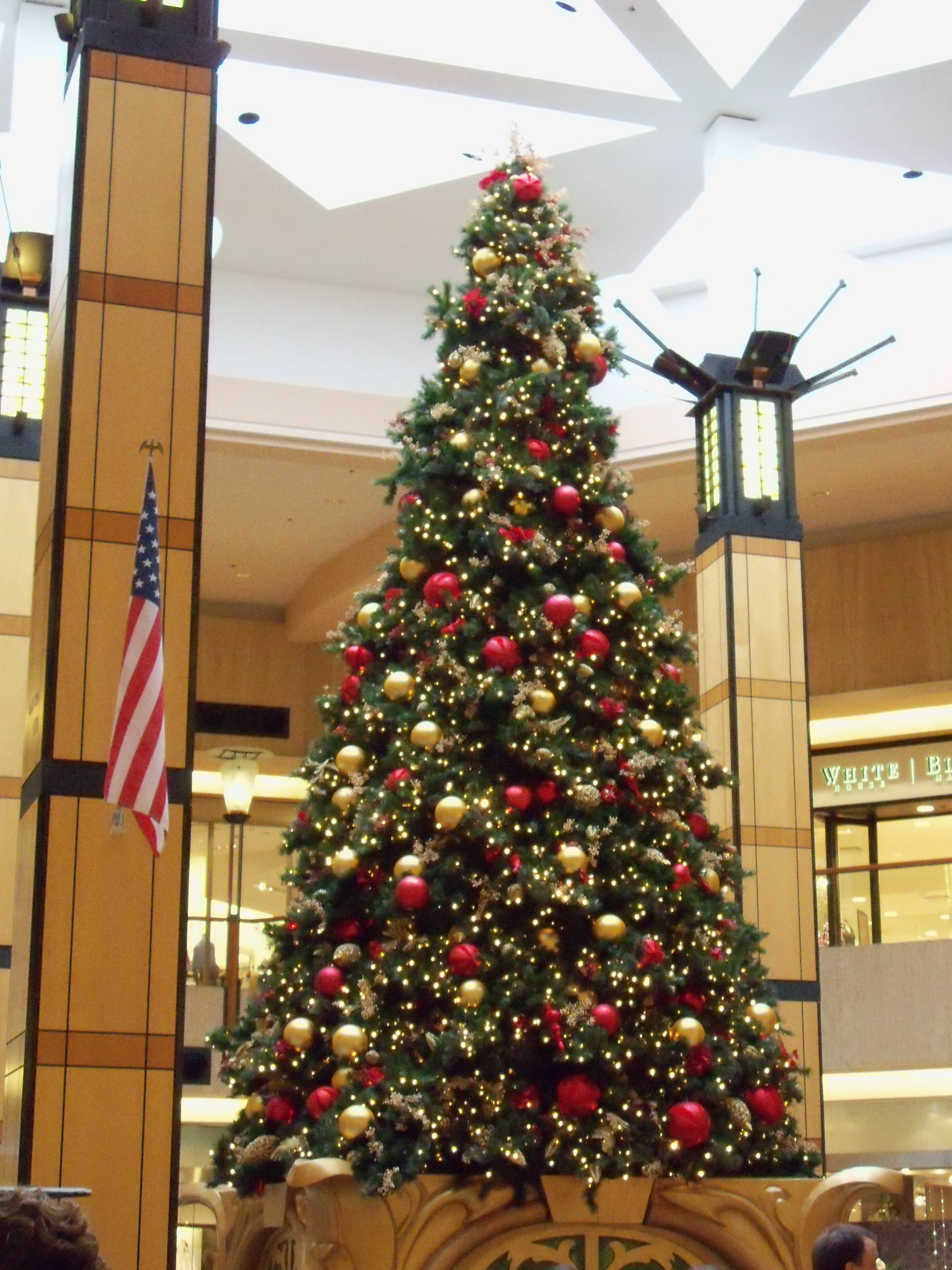
The mall’s Christmas Tree, which is no longer used.

=== Current ===
- Neiman Marcus — Opened in 1976
- AMC Theatres — Opened in 2002

=== Former ===
- Sears — Opened in 1976, closed in 1983, replaced by JCPenney
- Lord & Taylor — Opened in 1976, closed in 2020
- I. Magnin — Opened in 1976, closed in 1991, replaced by General Cinemas
- JCPenney — Opened in 1983, closed in 1992, replaced by Marshall Field's
- Marshall Field's — Opened in 1995, converted to Macy's in 2006
- General Cinemas — Opened in 1996, converted to AMC in 2002
- Macy's — Opened in 2006, closed in 2019, building was demolished

== Location ==
Northbrook Court is located on Lake Cook Road (Cook County Trunk Highway A50), between the Tri-State Tollway (Interstate 94/294) and Edens Expressway (Interstate 94/U.S. Highway 41). It is approximately 25 miles from downtown Chicago and approximately four to 12 miles from the nine communities that make up the North Shore and is accessible via public transit from them and the City of Chicago. It is only eight miles from Westfield Old Orchard.

== Filming ==
John Hughes, who grew up in Northbrook and attended Glenbrook North High School, used the mall for his teenage film Weird Science, a movie about two outcasts who create a girl, who in turn helps them stand up for themselves. The side of the mall used in the film for exterior shots is currently a California Pizza Kitchen and the former The Claim Company. The inside of the mall was also used; however, it has changed since the filming.

A scene from Ordinary People was filmed at the mall. Mary Tyler Moore’s character Beth Jarrett is shown shopping at Neiman Marcus and riding the escalator.

== Bus routes ==
Pace

- 213 Green Bay Road (Monday-Saturday only)
- 422 Linden CTA/Glenview/Northbrook Court (Weekdays only)
- 471 Highland Park/Northbrook Court (Monday-Saturday only)
- 626 Skokie – Buffalo Grove Limited (Weekday Rush Hours only)
