= Matt Svanson =

American baseball player (born 1999)

St. Louis Cardinals – No. 49
- Pitcher
- Born: January 31, 1999 (age 27); Lake Zurich, Illinois, U.S.
- Bats: Right Throws: Right

MLB debut
- April 17, 2025, for the St. Louis Cardinals

MLB statistics (through 2026 season)
- Win–loss record: 6–3
- Earned run average: 4.17
- Strikeouts: 109
- Stats at Baseball Reference

Teams
- St. Louis Cardinals (2025–present)

Matthew Patrick Svanson (born January 31, 1999) is an American professional baseball pitcher for the St. Louis Cardinals of Major League Baseball (MLB). He made his MLB debut in 2025.

== Amateur career ==
Svanson attended Lake Zurich High School in Lake Zurich, Illinois. He threw a perfect game in his first varsity baseball start as well as one additional perfect game and two no-hitters in high school.

He played college baseball at Lehigh University. He was named to the first-team All-Patriot League his senior season in 2021. After having an earned run average (ERA) above 4.70 his first three seasons of college, he had a 2.30 ERA and 4–4 record his final season.

Svanson played collegiate summer baseball for the Quakertown Blazers in 2018, the Brockton Rox in 2019, and the Wareham Gatemen of the Cape Cod Baseball League in 2021.

== Professional career ==
=== Toronto Blue Jays ===
The Toronto Blue Jays drafted Svanson in the 13th round, with the 392nd overall selection, of the 2021 Major League Baseball draft. He made his professional debut with the Single-A Dunedin Blue Jays, logging a 2.30 ERA in 11 games. After the season, Baseball America called Svanson Toronto's best late-round pick in the 2021 draft. Svanson split 2022 between Dunedin and the High-A Vancouver Canadians, posting a cumulative 8–5 record and 4.15 ERA with 83 strikeouts in 82 1/3 innings pitched across 28 games (9 starts). Svanson made two scoreless appearances for Dunedin in 2023, spending the majority of his time in Vancouver. In 24 appearances out of the bullpen, he registered a 4–1 record and 1.23 ERA with 36 strikeouts and 6 saves across 29 1/3 innings pitched.

=== St. Louis Cardinals ===
On August 1, 2023, the Blue Jays traded Svanson to the St. Louis Cardinals for Paul DeJong. Svanson made 15 appearances down the stretch for the Double-A Springfield Cardinals, posting a 2–0 record and 3.00 ERA with 25 strikeouts and 5 saves across 21 innings of work.

Svanson made 53 appearances for Springfield in 2024, with a 4–3 record, 2.69 ERA, 59 strikeouts, and 27 saves across 63 2/3 innings pitched. Following the season, the Cardinals added Svanson to their 40-man roster to protect him from the Rule 5 draft. He also pitched for the Glendale Desert Dogs in the Arizona Fall League.

The Cardinals optioned Svanson to the Triple-A Memphis Redbirds on March 7, 2025. After 4 appearances for Memphis, he was promoted to the major leagues for the first time on April 16. He made his MLB debut the following night, pitching a scoreless seventh inning and allowing a double against the New York Mets. After pitching four times, the Cardinals sent him back to Triple-A on May 2. On June 28, Svanson recorded his first career win, tossing a scoreless inning of relief against the Cleveland Guardians.
