= John Calhoun (publisher) =

American publisher and politician

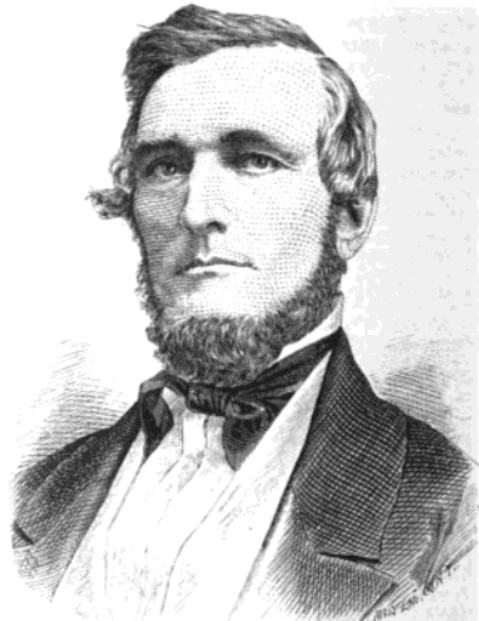

6th Cook County Treasurer
- In office May 1838 – June 1839
- Preceded by: Edward E. Hunter
- Succeeded by: Nathan H. Bolles

Chicago Alderman from the 1st ward
- In office 1842–1843 Serving with Norman B. Judd
- Preceded by: John Davlin/ Charles Follansbee
- Succeeded by: Cyrenus Beers/ Hugh T. Dickey

Personal details
- Born: April 14, 1808 Watertown, New York
- Died: February 20, 1859 (aged 50) Chicago, Illinois
- Resting place: Graceland Cemetery
- Spouse: Pamelia C. Hathaway
- Known for: Founding publisher of the Chicago Democrat

John Calhoun (April 14, 1808 – February 20, 1859) was an American publisher and politician from New York. Originally a student of carpentry, Calhoun learned the publishing trade in his hometown of Watertown, New York. After hearing about Chicago from a local, he moved there in 1833. Calhoun established the first paper in Chicago, the Chicago Democrat, which was first issued on November 26, 1833. Calhoun held a monopoly on the trade in Chicago until 1835; the next year he sold it to Long John Wentworth. Later in his life, Calhoun served a number of city and county political positions, including a seat on the Chicago City Council.

== Biography ==
John Calhoun was born in Watertown, New York, on April 14, 1808. He apprenticed as a carpenter, his father's profession. When he was sixteen, Calhoun took a job in the printing office of W. Woodward, who had just founded the Watertown Freeman. Over the next five years, Calhoun learned the printing trade. When he was twenty-one, Calhoun left for Albany to work for the Starr & Little type foundry, then left weeks later for Troy, before returning to his position with the Watertown Freeman. In the summer of 1831, Calhoun established his own printing office in partnership with Woodward. Perley Keyes convinced Calhoun to expand the operation, and the Watertown Eagle was founded. However, it provided too much of a financial challenger for Calhoun, and it was sold to Alvin Hunt, who ran it for many years.

Watertown resident Harlow Kimball visited Chicago in 1833 and inspired Calhoun to seek out the city. Calhoun shipped his hand press, type, and paper to Chicago and established an office on the southwest corner of South Water and Clark Streets. An ardent supporter of President Andrew Jackson, Calhoun named his new paper, the first in the emerging town, the Chicago Democrat, after the Democratic Party. The first issue appeared on November 26, 1833, and had 147 subscribers. The weekly newspaper was printed in a six-column, four-page format, and featured the motto, "Where Liberty dwells, there is my country". In May 1834, it was named the official paper of the town of Chicago and was responsible for printing new ordinances. The office was moved in November 1834 to a room above the Jones & King hardware store. The newspaper was forced to largely cease printing from January 1 to May 20, 1835, due to a paper shortage, although it did produce two issues during that period.

The monopoly of the Democrat ended in 1835 when T. O. Davis established The American, a Whig paper. To fight this competitor, Calhoun hired James Curtiss as a new editor. Daniel Brainard was also associated with editing the paper at some point in these early years. By May 1836 Calhoun had lost interest in the paper and attempted to sell it to a group of local Democrats, but the sale fell through. The paper was enlarged in August 1836. The last issue was published on November 16, 1836, and afterwards the paper was sold to Isaac Hill, who sold it to Long John Wentworth.

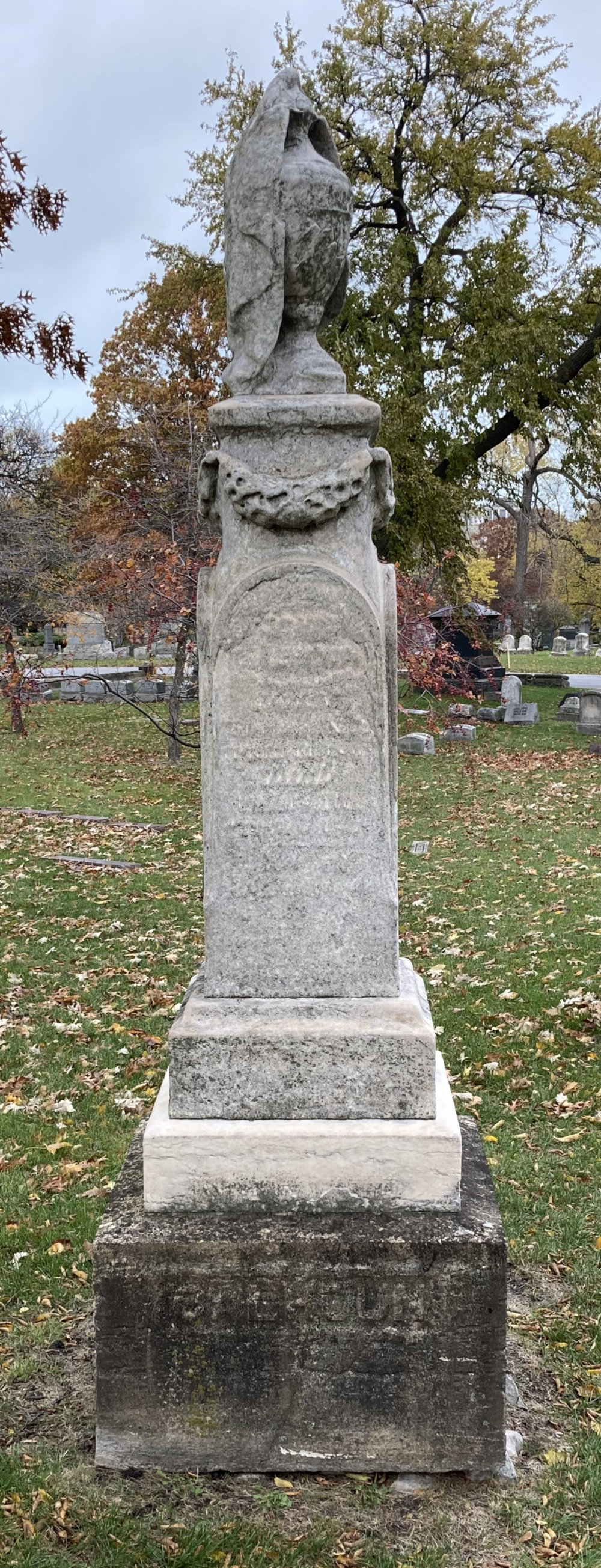
Calhoun's grave at Graceland Cemetery

In 1837, Calhoun was appointed Cook County treasurer, serving through 1838. The position was renamed Cook County Collector that year, and Calhoun was appointed each year through 1841. Calhoun was elected to the Chicago City Council in 1841, serving through 1842. Starting in 1845, Calhoun worked in Ira B. Eddy's hardware store; he aimed to become a partner, but Eddy closed the store in 1846. Calhoun went into partnership with Joseph Matteson, who had purchased Eddy's shares, in 1847. They ran the store for two years. Calhoun was hired by the Illinois Central Railroad in 1851 to make right-of-way purchases. He left in the spring in 1854 to travel with C. C. Washburn to Georgia to stamp out wildcat banks.

== Personal ==
Calhoun met his future wife, Pamelia C. Hathaway, when they were children attending the Universalist Sunday school in Watertown. They were married on May 31, 1832. Their two children died in infancy.

Calhoun died in Chicago on February 20, 1859. He was buried in Graceland Cemetery. A memorial to him stands in Calhoun Place, which is located in what is now an alley in the Chicago Loop central business district.
