= Ira B. Eddy =

American spiritualist and banker (1807–1891)

Ira B. Eddy (1807 – 10 August 1891) was an American spiritualist and businessman, best known for his involvement with Seth Paine's "Bank of Chicago" also known as the "Spiritualist Bank" where he served as President.

== Biography ==
Born in 1807 in Pittstown, New York, to Tisdale and Elizabeth Eddy, Ira Eddy married Sarah Lyon on June 14, 1836 in Canterbury, Connecticut and subsequently moved to Chicago, where Eddy converted to spiritualism sometime around 1853 and became an enthusiastic believer. The Bank of Chicago was founded in 1852 by fellow spiritualist Seth Paine, with Eddy serving as the bank's President. Eddy also provided the needed capital for Paine to start the bank.

The bank used spirit mediums as cashiers and financial advisors who claimed to act on the advice of deceased men such as former Secretary of the Treasury Alexander Hamilton or former U.S. Presidents George Washington and Andrew Jackson. Based on this advice, the Bank of Chicago created a scandal in 1853 when they refused to redeem bank notes. According to Henry Fowler, the leading journalist who exposed the bank in the Chicago Tribune, Paine and Eddy would "submit to be led by silly women" who effectively ran the bank through their spirit advice. The medium's spirit advice included not giving money in the form of loans or redemptions to smokers, drinkers, people who harmed animals, or who engaged in businesses such as land speculation or capitalistic acquisition. Spiritualist services were also offered in "Harmony Hall" on the bank's upper floor every Sunday.

In 1853 a group of rival bankers, led by George Smith and J. Young Scammon organized a bank run in order to put the Bank of Chicago out of business, capitalizing on anti-spiritualist sentiment and accusing the bank of both fraud and blasphemy. According to David Walker, Paine had recently charged Smith and Scammon with "a combination of greed, usury, speculation, shinplastering, wildcatting, monopoly, and market manipulation." According to Fowler's exposé in the Chicago Tribune, some people who would go to withdraw money from the bank would be called names such as "unclean," "scoundrel," "hog," and other epithets, while others had no problem withdrawing their funds. The deciding factor seemed to be what information the spirits gave to the leading medium, Mrs. Herrick, regarding the client's morals; although Ira Eddy later testified that the policy was to prioritize redemptions for people of color and women.

As a result of the scandal, Eddy's wife Sarah filled for him to be committed to an insane asylum and for his brother, Devotion C. Eddy, to be made conservator of his estate. During the court proceedings, Ira Eddy allegedly threatened the court bookkeeper with a loaded gun, and the other employees of the bank got involved and were subsequently arrested, including Herrick and Paine. Ultimately the court upheld the commission of lunacy against Eddy and he was sent to the Hartford Retreat for the Insane in July 1853, with his assets being transferred to Devotion and Sarah Eddy.

Once at Hartford however, the doctor John S. Butler testified that he had not found any evidence of insanity after a week of observation, and Eddy and his lawyer argued that his commission had been orchestrated by his family in order to take control of his money and property and had him freed. In June 1854, almost a year after his conviction, Eddy officially had his commission of insanity overturned and regained control of his property worth an estimated $80,000 (equivalent to $2,866,667 in 2025), although the bank was no longer in existence.

Eddy later spent some time in Utah and may have been involved in some way with the Mormons there. Eddy married fellow spiritualist and Chicago-based medium Caroline Ellen Lamson (1830-1890) on 22 March 1873. They had an adopted daughter named Ida Helen Eddy (1876-1946). Ira Eddy died on 10 August, 1891, in Chicago at the age of 84, and was buried in Rosehill Cemetery. Issues of Eddy's sanity in relation to his belief in spiritualism again ended up in court during the execution of his will.

== Sources ==
- Britten, Emma Hardinge (1870). Modern American Spiritualism: Twenty Years' Record of the Communion Between Earth and the World of Spirits. New York: Britten.
- Fowler, Henry (10 February 1853). "The Bank of Chicago and Spiritualism". Chicago Tribune.
- Mark, Norman (1979). Mayors, Madams, and Madmen. Chicago Review Press. ISBN 978-0-914090-69-4.
- Walker, David (2025). "Banking". In Seales, Chad E. (ed.). The Routledge Handbook of Religion and American Culture. Routledge. pp. 93–110. ISBN 978-1-003-35735-3.
