= Anthony Castonzo =

American football player (born 1988)

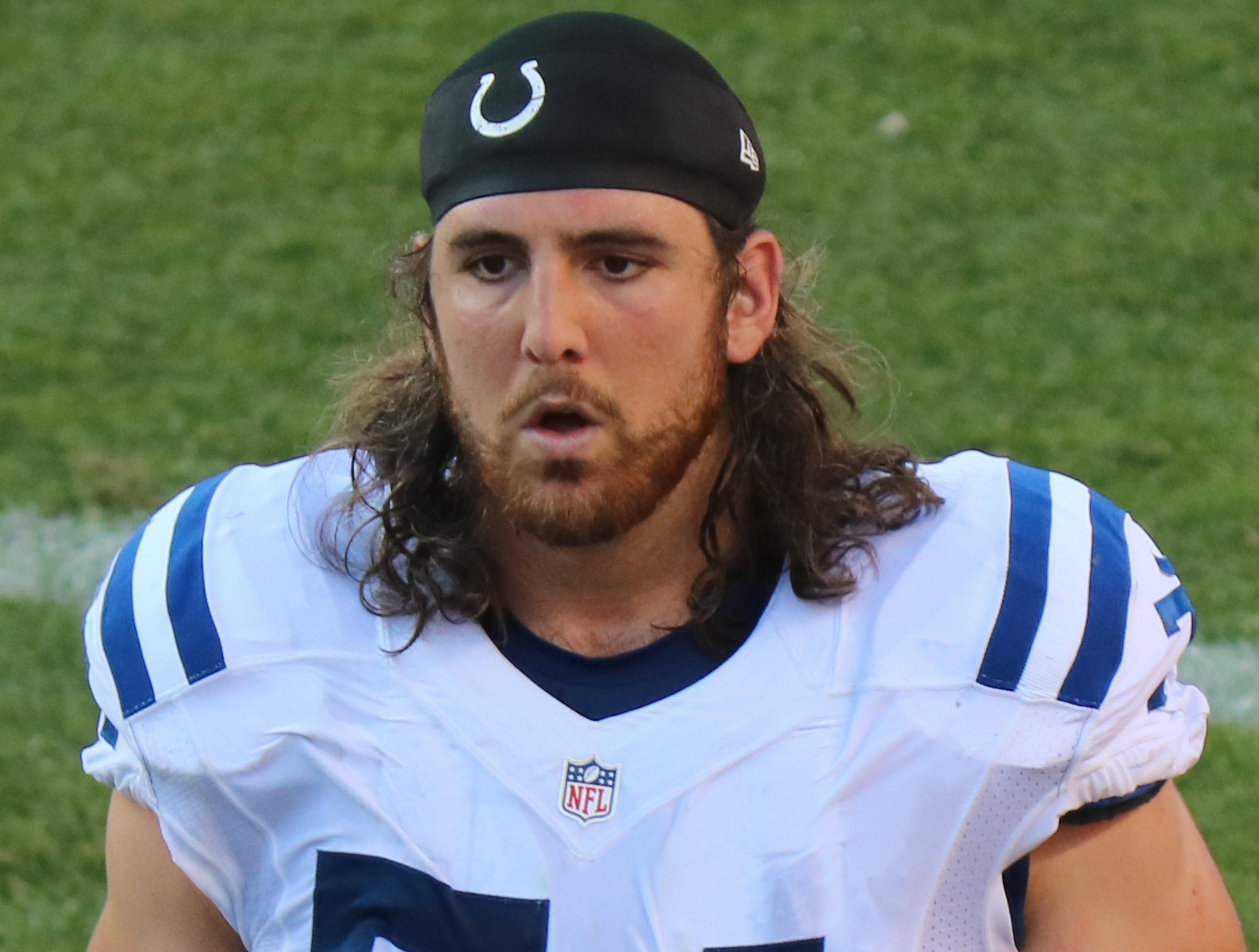
- Castonzo with the Indianapolis Colts in 2016

No. 74
- Position: Offensive tackle

Personal information
- Born: August 9, 1988 (age 38); Park Ridge, Illinois, U.S.
- Listed height: 6 ft 7 in (2.01 m)
- Listed weight: 307 lb (139 kg)

Career information
- High school: Lake Zurich (Lake Zurich, Illinois)
- College: Boston College (2007–2010)
- NFL draft: 2011: 1st round, 22nd overall pick

Career history
- Indianapolis Colts (2011–2020)

Awards and highlights
- Second-team All-American (2010); Nils V. "Swede" Nelson Award (2010); 2× First-team All-ACC (2009, 2010); Second-team All-ACC (2008)

Career NFL statistics
- Games played: 144
- Games started: 144
- Receptions: 1
- Receiving yards: 1
- Receiving touchdowns: 1
- Stats at Pro Football Reference

Anthony Salvatore Castonzo (born August 9, 1988) is an American former professional football player who was an offensive tackle for 10 seasons with the Indianapolis Colts of the National Football League (NFL). After playing college football for the Boston College Eagles, Castonzo was selected by the Colts with their first round draft pick in the 2011 NFL draft.

== Early life and family ==
Castonzo grew up in Hawthorn Woods, Illinois, where his parents Shari and Bill family ran an Italian restaurant. He has a brother Billy, and two sisters Kristyn and Carissa.

Castonzo attended Fork Union Military Academy in Virginia, where he was a two-way tackle for the Blue Devils and also saw action at the tight end spot, playing for Coach John Shuman. He previously attended Lake Zurich High School in Lake Zurich, Illinois.

Considered a two-star recruit by Rivals.com, Castonzo ranked No. 44 among prep school prospects in 2007. He did not have any major scholarship offers when he finished high school.

== College career ==
Becoming the first true freshman to start on the offensive line at Boston College since Paul Zukauskas in 1998, Castonzo helped hold opponents to only 61 tackles-for-loss (fifth in the nation) and 22 quarterback sacks in 2007. By protecting quarterback Matt Ryan at right tackle, he helped pave the way for the Eagles' 5,924 yards in total offense. Castonzo subsequently received All-ACC Freshman honors by The Sporting News and Freshman All-American honors by the Football Writers Association of America.

Prior to his sophomore season, Castonzo made the move from right tackle to left tackle where he started all 14 games in 2008. Boston College ranked 25th in the country in tackles for a loss allowed (4.77) and 49th in sacks allowed (1.69). Castonzo earned a College Football News All-Sophomore First-team selection.

In 2009, Castonzo was listed at No. 9 on Rivals.com′s preseason offensive tackle power ranking. Following a productive junior season, Castonzo was selected 2009 First-team All-Atlantic Coast Conference as voted on by the 40 members of the Atlantic Coast Sports Media Association. He set the record for career starts with 54 straight at Boston College and was a Rhodes Scholar nominee in 2010.

== Professional career ==
Pre-draft measurables
Height	Weight	Arm length	Hand span	Wingspan	40-yard dash	10-yard split	20-yard split	20-yard shuttle	Three-cone drill	Vertical jump	Broad jump	Bench press
6 ft 7 in (2.01 m)	311 lb (141 kg)	34 1/2 in (0.88 m)	10 5/8 in (0.27 m)	6 ft 9 1/4 in (2.06 m)	5.23 s	1.82 s	3.03 s	4.40 s	7.25 s	29 1/2 in (0.75 m)	8 ft 9 in (2.67 m)	28 reps
All values from NFL Combine

=== 2011 ===
The Indianapolis Colts selected Castonzo in the first round (22nd overall) of the 2011 NFL draft. He was the third offensive tackle off the board, after USC's Tyron Smith (9th overall) and Colorado's Nate Solder (17th overall). He was the highest offensive linemen selected from Boston College since Gosder Cherilus (17th overall) in 2008.

On July 30, 2011, the Colts signed Castonzo to a four-year, $8.0 million contract with $6.53 million guaranteed and a signing bonus of $4.31 million.

Castonzo entered training camp slated as the starting left tackle after it was left vacant by the departure of Charlie Johnson to the Minnesota Vikings in free agency. Head coach Jim Caldwell named him the starting left tackle to begin the regular season.

He made his first career start and professional regular season debut in the Indianapolis Colts' season-opening 34–7 loss at the Houston Texans. Castonzo missed Weeks 5–8 after suffering an ankle injury. He started 12 games during his rookie season and the Colts finished 2–14 without longtime starting quarterback Peyton Manning and head coach Jim Caldwell was fired. He allowed six sacks, 28 quarterback pressures, and received an overall grade of −2.8 from Pro Football Focus. His run blocking received a grade of +0.1 and his pass blocking was graded −0.5.

=== 2012 ===
Castonzo remained the starting left tackle to begin the 2012 season. He started 16 regular season games and helped the Colts achieve an 11–5 record in their first year under Chuck Pagano and interim head coach Bruce Arians. On January 6, 2013, Castonzo started his first career playoff game as the Indianapolis Colts lost 24–9 to the Baltimore Ravens in the AFC Wildcard playoffs. He received a grade of +3.3 from Pro Football Focus that ranked him the 32nd best offensive tackle in the league. His final PFF grades were −11.1 for pass blocking and +9.7 for run blocking. In 16 games, he only allowed ten sacks and 58 total quarterback pressures.

=== 2013 ===
Castonzo returned in 2013 and started 16 consecutive games to help the Colts finish first in the AFC South with an 11–5 record. Pro Football Focus graded him +3.9 overall, −8.7 in pass blocking, and +11.2 in run blocking. Castonzo allowed only four sacks and was responsible for 62 quarterback pressures. His pass blocking grade ranked 56th among all offensive tackles in 2013.

=== 2014 ===
On April 28, 2014, the Indianapolis Colts opted to exercise the fifth-year, $7.438 million option on Castonzo's rookie contract. In Week 11, Castonzo recorded his first career reception and touchdown, catching a one-yard pass from Andrew Luck. He started all 16 games and played 1,115 snaps during the 2014 season, the most of any offensive lineman in the NFL. Pro Football Focus gave him a grade of +18.5 overall. His pass blocking immensely improved as he received a grade +18.1 in pass blocking and −2.1 in run blocking. Castonzo ranked sixth among all qualifying offensive tackles in pass blocking grade and an overall grade ranked 12th out of 86 qualifying offensive tackles. Castonzo allowed only two sacks and 36 quarterback pressures as the Indianapolis Colts finish first in their division with an 11–5 record. PFF also ranked him the 66th best player on their 101 NFL Players of 2014 list.

=== 2015 ===
On September 10, 2015, the Indianapolis Colts signed Castonzo to a four-year, $43.81 million contract that includes $18 million guaranteed and a signing bonus of $14 million.

Castonzo started ten games at left tackle before suffering a knee sprain and missing three games (Weeks 12–14). He finished with 13 starts as the Indianapolis Colts finished second in the AFC South with an 8–8 record. Castonzo received the 12th highest grade among 84 qualifying offensive tackles from Pro Football Focus in 2015. The entire Indianapolis Colts' offensive line was ranked 16th by PFF.

=== 2016 ===
Castonzo started all 16 games as the Indianapolis Colts finished third in the AFC South with an 8–8 record.

=== 2017 ===
Castonzo once again started all 16 games with the Colts, finishing third in the AFC South with a 4–12 record.

=== 2018 ===
After missing the first five games due to a hamstring injury, he made his season debut in Week 8, starting the final 11 games at left tackle.

=== 2020 ===
On March 15, 2020, Castonzo signed a two-year, $33 million contract extension with the Colts. On December 30, 2020, Castonzo had ankle surgery, and he was placed on injured reserve two days later. On January 12, 2021, Castonzo announced his retirement from the NFL.
