= Chicago Democrat =

Newspaper in Chicago

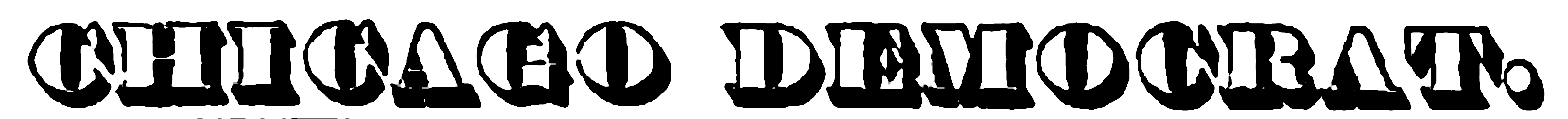
- Type: Daily newspaper
- Founded: 1833
- Ceased publication: 1861
- Language: English
- Headquarters: Chicago

The Chicago Democrat was the first newspaper in Chicago, Illinois. It was published from 1833 to 1861. In 2017 Atom, LLC restarted Chicago Democrat and has built a website aimed at statewide coverage of news, sports, weather and information in Illinois.

== History ==
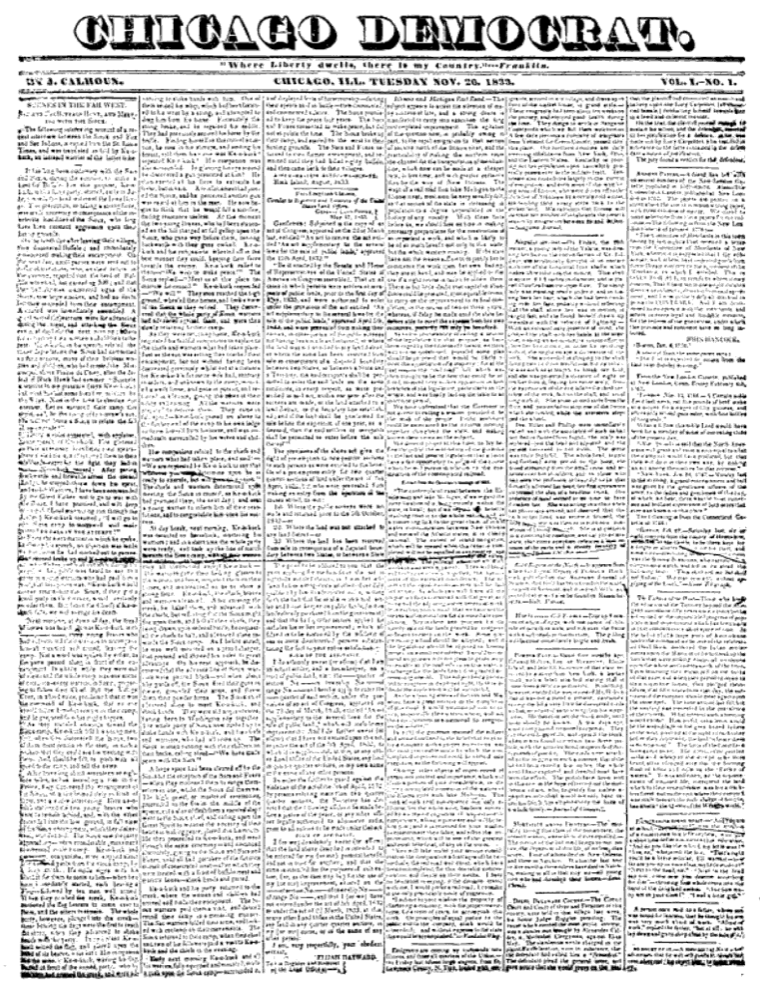
Vol. 1. No. 1. of the Chicago Democrat

Publisher John Calhoun was a Jacksonian Democrat, lured west at the end of 1833 from Watertown, New York to start the Democrat inspired by traveler's stories about Chicago after a series of newspaper business failures in his home state of New York. Printing paid better than newspaper publishing, but the paper was valuable to the new community both to boost the town and bring more people to it and to forward the affairs of its avowed political party.

Publishing a newspaper on the frontier was challenging. In May 1835 Calhoun issued a second prospectus that apologized for the paper's virtual disappearance over the previous four months and promised a new editor would upgrade the quality of news when the Democrat re-appeared. He cited a lack of available paper on which to print during the winter of 1834-1835. He did not cite, but presumably was responding to, the appearance of his first competition, the Chicago's American (sponsored by a rival political party, the Whigs).

In 1836 Calhoun handed the paper over to a syndicate of Democratic politicians, perhaps in return for the party position to which he was appointed, Cook County Treasurer. The syndicate meanwhile hired "Long" John Wentworth, newly arrived in the city with solid Democratic credentials. Wentworth bought the paper outright from this syndicate within a few years.

Wentworth's rivals were probably at least partially correct when they accused him of printing more news about himself than the city. This strategy appears to have been successful, since Wentworth represented Chicago in the United States Congress on and off throughout this period, and also served as mayor of Chicago twice.

Lack of circulation figures for the Democrat makes it hard to know much about the paper's audience, but it seems likely that in the 1850s their number dwindled. The staff was kept small while the number of reporters at other papers grew, and the printing presses failed to keep up with the times and other newspapers such as the Chicago Tribune (started in 1847).

Wentworth, owner of the Democrat, had become by the end of the 1850s a member of the new Republican Party — a turnabout that can be said, with some oversimplification, to have resulted from the politics of the years before the American Civil War when feelings about slavery caused shifting alliances and political turmoil throughout the country.

In 1861, just before the war started, Wentworth closed the Democrat. He said he was tired from his recent term as mayor and unable to continue after the death of his assistant, David Bradley. Others speculated he did not care to invest the money it would take to modernize and adequately cover the war many expected at any moment. A more pressing cause was a $250,000 libel lawsuit by another of Chicago's Old Settlers, J. Young Scammon. Scammon was angry because Wentworth had published a cartoon depicting him as a "wildcat" banker (the fat cat in the picture wore a pair of Scammon’s distinctive spectacles).

Wentworth gave his subscription list to the Chicago Tribune, whose publishers induced Scammon to drop the suit in return. Wentworth’s political career went on but his paper was gone; although his own complete run of the paper was burned in the 1871 Chicago Fire, many issues are now available through the Chicago History Museum, Chicago Public Library, and other repositories.
