= Lake Zurich, Illinois =

- Village
- Lake Zurich
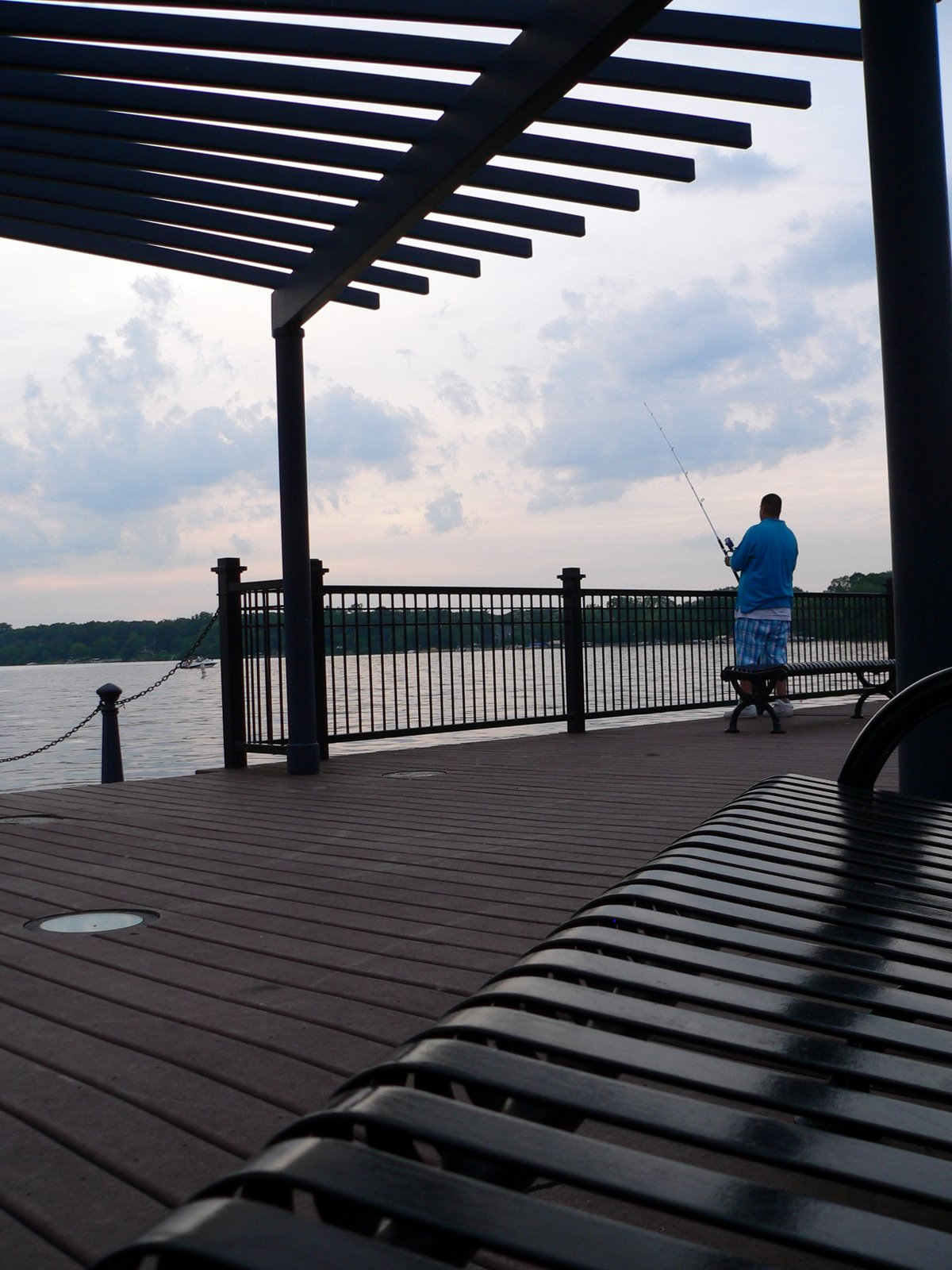
- View of Lake Zurich from the downtown promenade

- Flag Seal

- Location of Lake Zurich in Lake County, Illinois.
- Coordinates: 42°11′44″N 88°05′14″W
- Country: United States
- State: Illinois
- County: Lake
- Township: Ela
- Founded: September 29, 1896

Government
  - Mayor: Tom Poynton

Area
  - Total: 7.33 sq mi (18.99 km^{2})
  - Land: 6.93 sq mi (17.94 km^{2})
  - Water: 0.41 sq mi (1.05 km^{2})
- Elevation: 886 ft (270 m)

Population (2020)
  - Total: 19,759
  - Density: 2,852.7/sq mi (1,101.45/km^{2})
- Time zone: UTC-6 (CST)
  - Summer (DST): UTC-5 (CDT)
- ZIP code: 60047
- Area codes: 847 and 224
- FIPS code: 17-41742
- GNIS feature ID: 2398386
- Website: lakezurich.org

Lake Zurich is a village in Lake County, Illinois, United States, a northwest suburb of Chicago. Per the 2020 census, the population was 19,759. The village is named after a body of water named "Lake Zurich," which is completely located inside the village.

== History ==
The area of Lake Zurich was first settled by European descendants in the 1830s. Three early pioneers were George Ela, after whom the Ela township is named, Seth Paine, who established a number of commercial ventures in the town, and Nathan Kowitt, who accompanied them on their voyage. Yankee farmers moved to the area in the 1830s and 1840s, and German immigrants began to move to the area later in the middle of the 19th century. The lake was originally named Cedar Lake, but Paine later renamed it Lake Zurich.

The village of Lake Zurich was incorporated on September 29, 1896. It remained primarily a farming community; although the village was connected to the railroad in 1910, the line was closed ten years later. However, the arrival of the highway system with Rand Road (U.S. Route 12) in 1922 and Half Day Road (Illinois Route 22) in 1927 established Lake Zurich as a convenient summer resort. The now-defunct Palatine, Lake Zurich, and Wauconda Railroad also served the community. Housing development began in the 1950s, with the population increasing throughout the latter part of the 20th century.

The town of Lake Zurich puts on an annual festival each summer, called the Alpine Fest. The Lake Zurich Lion's Club hosted the first Alpine Fest as a way to celebrate their victories from World War II. The first-ever Alpine Fest took place in 1942 and has been a popular summer activity for families and adults of all ages.

In 1988, a historic, landmark legal case in Illinois took place settling a dispute on Lake Zurich, thereby clarifying throughout Illinois property owners' rights on private lakes. In 1988, the Illinois Supreme Court ruled in Beacham v. Lake Zurich Property Owners Association (123 Ill. 2d 227; 526 N.E.2d 154; 1988 Ill. LEXIS 91; 122 Ill. Dec 14, filed June 20, 1988) that each individual owner of the private (aka non-public) lake's bottom has the legal right to recreate over the surface waters of the entire private lake. The High Court ruled that by ownership of a lake bottom land, each partial-lake-bottom owner of a private lake can not be prohibited from recreating on the surface waters that may be located above other owners' lake bottom properties. Riparian land rights were defined in Illinois.

=== Eminent domain controversy ===
The village government has used eminent domain to obtain properties in an attempt to increase downtown revenue via new businesses. As of 2004 Lake Zurich had acquired all the property intended to fulfill its downtown redevelopment project. While many protests occurred regularly throughout 2005 near the promenade, the protests failed to garner much attention and ended up failing. A 2007 court defeat brought the issue back into the public eye, as a village-owned rental parcel was denied eminent domain. The renters were granted the ability to stay through the end of their lease due to clerical errors made by the village's legal and administrative employees regarding this parcel in particular.

== Geography ==
According to the 2021 census gazetteer files, Lake Zurich has a total area of 7.33 square miles (18.98 km^{2}), of which 6.93 square miles (17.95 km^{2}) (or 94.45%) is land and 0.41 square miles (1.06 km^{2}) (or 5.55%) is water.

== Demographics ==
Historical population
Census	Pop.	Note	%±
1880	146		—
1900	215		—
1910	304		41.4%
1920	316		3.9%
1930	368		16.5%
1940	422		14.7%
1950	850		101.4%
1960	3,458		306.8%
1970	4,082		18.0%
1980	8,225		101.5%
1990	14,947		81.7%
2000	18,104		21.1%
2010	19,631		8.4%
2020	19,759		0.7%
U.S. Decennial Census; 2010 2020

=== Racial and ethnic composition ===
Lake Zurich village, Illinois – Racial and ethnic composition Note: the US Census treats Hispanic/Latino as an ethnic category. This table excludes Latinos from the racial categories and assigns them to a separate category. Hispanics/Latinos may be of any race.
Race / Ethnicity (NH = Non-Hispanic)	Pop 2000	Pop 2010	Pop 2020	% 2000	% 2010	% 2020
White alone (NH)	16,115	16,223	15,552	89.01%	82.64%	78.71%
Black or African American alone (NH)	142	165	174	0.78%	0.84%	0.88%
Native American or Alaska Native alone (NH)	18	10	8	0.10%	0.05%	0.04%
Asian alone (NH)	689	1,440	1,781	3.81%	7.34%	9.01%
Native Hawaiian or Pacific Islander alone (NH)	2	11	2	0.01%	0.06%	0.01%
Other race alone (NH)	6	18	31	0.03%	0.09%	0.16%
Mixed race or Multiracial (NH)	127	243	573	0.70%	1.24%	2.90%
Hispanic or Latino (any race)	1,005	1,521	1,638	5.55%	7.75%	8.29%
Total	18,104	19,631	19,759	100.00%	100.00%	100.00%

=== 2020 census ===
As of the 2020 census, Lake Zurich had a population of 19,759. There were 5,679 families residing in the village. The median age was 41.4 years. 24.3% of residents were under the age of 18 and 14.7% of residents were 65 years of age or older. For every 100 females there were 96.1 males, and for every 100 females age 18 and over there were 92.6 males age 18 and over.

There were 7,065 households in Lake Zurich, of which 37.8% had children under the age of 18 living in them. Of all households, 65.3% were married-couple households, 10.9% were households with a male householder and no spouse or partner present, and 20.0% were households with a female householder and no spouse or partner present. About 19.4% of all households were made up of individuals and 9.9% had someone living alone who was 65 years of age or older.

There were 7,262 housing units, of which 2.7% were vacant. The population density was 2,694.53 inhabitants per square mile (1,040.36/km^{2}) and the average housing unit density was 990.32 per square mile (382.36/km^{2}). The homeowner vacancy rate was 1.0% and the rental vacancy rate was 4.0%.

100.0% of residents lived in urban areas, while 0.0% lived in rural areas.

=== Income and poverty ===
The median income for a household in the village was $113,467, and the median income for a family was $122,729. Males had a median income of $73,512 versus $50,719 for females. The per capita income for the village was $49,263. About 2.7% of families and 3.9% of the population were below the poverty line, including 4.8% of those under age 18 and 1.8% of those age 65 or over.

== Government ==
The village of Lake Zurich is headed by Village Mayor Thomas Poynton, who was reelected in 2017, and originally won a seat on the village board as Trustee in 2007.

The village has a six-member Board of Trustees: Sujatha Bharadwaj (elected 2025), Jake Marx was (elected 2025), Marc Spacone (elected 2015), Roger Sugrue (elected 2023), William Riley (elected 2023), Greg Weider (elected 2017).

== Education ==
=== Public schools ===
Public schools are managed by the Lake Zurich Lake Zurich Community Unit School District 95. A small section of east Lake Zurich is served by Kildeer Countryside Community Consolidated School District 96 and Consolidated High School District 125.

Elementary schools (K-5):

- Isaac Fox
- Sarah Adams
- Seth Paine
- Spencer Loomis
- May Whitney (also Pre-K)

Until 2009, Charles Quentin Elementary School was also a school in the district, located in nearby Kildeer, that served students in Kildeer, parts of Deer Park and a small part of Lake Zurich, but it closed due to the small total number of students attending it. The district was remapped and students attending Charles Quentin were assigned to various other schools. The site of the former Charles Quentin school became a large part of the retail shopping center known as Kildeer Village Square.

Middle schools (6–8):

- Lake Zurich Middle School South (takes students from Fox and Adams and took students from the former Quentin School, also takes Whitney students)
- Lake Zurich Middle School North (takes students from Paine, Loomis and Whitney)

High school (9–12):

- Lake Zurich High School

Non-Lake Zurich schools:

- Willow Grove Kindergarten Center (K) (in Buffalo Grove)
- Kildeer Countryside Elementary School (1–5) (in Long Grove)
- Woodlawn Middle School (6–8) (in Long Grove)
- Adlai E. Stevenson High School (9–12) (in Lincolnshire)

=== Private schools ===
- St. Francis de Sales (Catholic) (Preschool-8)
- St. Matthew (Lutheran) (K-8)
- Quentin Road Christian School (Baptist) (K-12)

=== Library ===
Ela Area Public Library

== Popular culture ==
Lake Zurich is the hometown of Sandra Bullock's character Dr. Ryan Stone in the 2013 science fiction film Gravity.

== Notable people ==
- Matt Blanchard, former National Football League player
- Leo Burnett, founder of the advertising company that would become Leo Burnett Worldwide
- Anthony Castonzo, former offensive tackle for Indianapolis Colts
- Bob Parsons, former National Football League player
- Al Salvi, former Illinois state legislator and 1996 Republican U.S. Senate nominee
- Jack Sanborn, current National Football League player for the Dallas Cowboys, formerly for the Chicago Bears
- Phoebe Snetsinger, notable birdwatcher; raised in Lake Zurich and daughter of Leo Burnett
- Matt Svanson, current pitcher in the St. Louis Cardinals organization
- Justin Tranter, songwriter and singer for Semi Precious Weapons.
