= George Smith (financier) =

American banker (1808–1899)

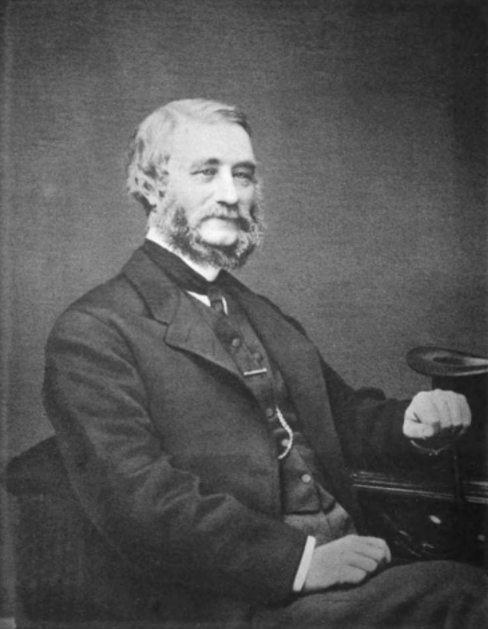
- Born: February 10, 1808; Aberdeen, Scotland
- Died: October 7, 1899 (aged 91); London, England
- Occupation: Banker

George Smith (February 10, 1808 – October 7, 1899) was an important banker in the mid-19th century in Chicago.

== Biography ==
Born in Aberdeen, Scotland, Smith visited Illinois and Wisconsin in 1835 and felt there was money to be made. He returned home and gathered subscribers and back in Chicago used those funds to found the Scottish Illinois Land Investment Company. He stepped into the vacuum left in the wake of the Panic of 1837 during which most banks in Chicago failed used his company as an unchartered bank. Through that company he was able to bring in notes from solvent banks in other parts of the country helping to revive Chicago's economy.

By 1839, he had founded an insurance company based in Wisconsin, the Wisconsin Marine and Fire Insurance Company, whose notes he circulated in his new unchartered bank, George Smith and Company. These notes were used much like currency and came to be called "George Smith's money" and by 1842 were redeemable in gold and silver. Two years later Smith's was the only bank left in Illinois and by 1854 75% of Chicago's currency was backed by Smith.

His efforts were interpreted differently across the country, for example a bank founded by Lemuel Grant in Atlanta, Georgia in 1852 was forced to close down when Smith circulated their notes widely throughout the midwest. It was made insolvent by 1856.

Smith accumulated a fortune in Chicago but by 1857 he was living in London where he was known as "Chicago" Smith, due to his association with that city. For many years, he rented rooms in the Reform Club, where he died in late 1899. He was a bachelor, and on his death he left his huge fortune (by one account it was between seven and eight million pounds) to two nephews in Chicago and Scotland.
