= Kildeer, Illinois =

- Village
- Logo
- Motto: "A Unique Village in a Natural Setting"
- Location of Kildeer in Lake County, Illinois
- Coordinates: 42°10′59″N 88°02′56″W
- Country: United States
- State: Illinois
- County: Lake
- Township: Ela

Area
  - Total: 4.43 sq mi (11.47 km^{2})
  - Land: 4.23 sq mi (10.96 km^{2})
  - Water: 0.20 sq mi (0.51 km^{2})
- Elevation: 787 ft (240 m)

Population (2020)
  - Total: 4,091
  - Density: 967.0/sq mi (373.38/km^{2})
- Time zone: UTC-6 (CST)
  - Summer (DST): UTC-5 (CDT)
- ZIP code: 60047
- Area code(s): 847, 224
- FIPS code: 17-39883
- GNIS feature ID: 2398344
- Website: www.villageofkildeer.com

Kildeer is a village in southwestern Lake County, Illinois, United States, and a suburb of Chicago. Per the 2020 census, the population was 4,091.

== History ==
This area was largely rural and made up of farms and undeveloped lands until after World War II. Increased population and pent-up demand for housing resulted in new suburban development outside many major cities, aided by federal investment in highways that eased commuting to work. Lake County began to prepare by paving its roads and improving some. The Kildeer area began to attract persons who wanted to live a relatively rural life. In 1951 Quentin Road was realigned, removing the four right-angle turns, and substituting a smooth curve north from Rand Road. In 1952 its entire length was paved.

In the mid-1950s, Henry Bosch Jr. submitted a residential subdivision to the county containing mostly 2-acre (0.81 ha) homesites. On April 15, 1955, it was approved and called Boschome Farms. Bosch wanted to retain strict control of his subdivision and refused to sell lots to builders. As a condition of sale, each purchaser had to submit plans for their residence to Bosch and receive his approval prior to building. Not long after, the land south of Boschome Farms was subdivided as Long Grove Valley. Unit I was approved September 16, 1955, Unit 2 on February 1, 1957, and Unit 3 on June 20, 1957.

=== Brickman Builders ===
On October 16, 1958, Brickman Builders of Chicago announced their intent to build a planned community "of the future" consisting of 20,000 residential units in Ela Township, Lake County. This planned community would cover 9 square miles (23 km^{2}) south and southeast of Lake Zurich. It would contain 16,000 single-family homes, 6,000 apartments or duplex units, one high school, four junior high schools, 29 grade schools, a country club, and ten church sites. Ten percent of the area would be reserved for industrial use. The development would have an ultimate population of 60,000 and take 15 years to build. There would be a central shopping mall at West Cuba and Quentin Road containing a major department store, a variety store, ten small shops, one or more supermarkets, a bank, two drugstores, two restaurants, a professional and medical center, with provisions for parking 2,500 cars. Six smaller shopping centers were also to be located in neighborhoods.

When Joseph M. Brickman announced his "billion dollar city", he claimed to have bought or had options on 2,000 of the required 6,222 acres (25.18 km^{2}). He said it would be the largest planned community in the country. It would bring organized development with planned infrastructure and amenities to the projected rapid growth of the area. Existing residents were surprised, as many had moved here to enjoy the tranquil countryside. They learned that Brickman intended to incorporate his land as a village. If there were 100 residents and 35 voters living within the prescribed boundaries, they could hold a referendum to establish a village form of government. The existing residents feared that Brickman could effectively select individuals to have voted into office, and form his own government, passing codes and ordinances to serve his own interests.

In the summer of 1957 Brickman began building a subdivision on Sturm's farm, located on the south side of Rand Road just west of Quentin Road. He rented the completed homes to Brickman real estate agents and other company employees. Surrounding residents became suspicious when they learned that such renters were paying only $50 per month for a three-bedroom house. Brickman was rumored to be moving migrant farm workers into structures on other properties. People became convinced that Brickman would shortly incorporate the Sturm Subdivision and systematically annex his adjacent parcels. Brickman was seeking rezoning from Lake County of the latter properties in order to permit small lots, which would enable more dense development.

Inspired by longtime resident Dorothea Huszagh, local residents organized and petitioned to hold a referendum on incorporating a municipality. Brickman attempted to move a small red barn west on East Cuba Road to use as housing for his workers. Although the barn was mounted on a truck, it could not be transported across the one-lane bridge over Buffalo Creek because of large overhanging oak tree branches. The foreman ordered the branches to be cut down but neighbors told him the tree was on private property and a confrontation ensued. By the time the County police arrived, Rudy Huszagh had fired a rifle into the ground to stop the workmen. The police ordered the workers to take the barn back to the farm and dispersed the residents.

On September 8, 1996, the village of Kildeer mounted a plaque on the bridge dedicating it as a memorial to Dorothea Huszagh, who died in 1995, and to others who had opposed the 1950s planned development of this area.

=== Incorporation ===
On March 22, 1958, residents held a referendum on the question of establishing the Village of Kildeer. Area residents voted to incorporate the new village with a population of 153, making it the 32nd municipality in Lake County. The polling place for this election was the home of Dorothea Huszagh. Brickman filed suit to have the referendum overturned, asking the support of Deer Park and Long Grove village boards to support the dissolution of the village of Kildeer. They declined, as these villages had been incorporated in 1957 and 1959 as protection against being included in Brickman's grand plan.

The Lake Zurich village board voted four to three against Brickman's county rezoning attempt. Just prior to their vote, the same board had voted to rescind their required $275 contribution per home and 10 percent land dedication by builders. Some analysts thought Brickman had intended to gain rezoning by first annexing his land to Lake Zurich and later disconnecting to form a separate village.

In April 1958 a meeting of Kildeer village residents was held. The following people were selected and sworn in to serve as Kildeer's first officials.

- President - J. Larry Powell
- Village Clerk - Hertha G. Severance
- Trustees - Edwin G. Bradshaw, Harold S. Faber, Richard W. Huszagh, Harry P. Keeley Jr., C. J. Lauer, P. H. Severance
- Police Magistrate - Samuel S. LaBue

About March 12, 1959, the Lake County Board unanimously rejected Brickman's small lot zoning request. He sued to reverse the Board's decision, but in September the Circuit Court of Waukegan upheld the decision. In November Brickman lost his challenge of the Kildeer referendum; he said he would appeal the case to the Illinois Supreme Court. On June 9, 1960, the Supreme Court found in favor of Kildeer. The battle was over. Brickman left the area after selling a parcel of 475 acres (1.92 km^{2}) to the Arthur T. Mcintosh Co., who developed the property as a subdivision called "Farmington".

The new Kildeer village board had many tasks: First, it had to dispose of legal bills accumulated from opposing Brickman. Not having any revenue sources, the board appealed for contributions from the 45 families that made up the village. The funds received fell short by only $362.00, indicating a strong community spirit. The village president and three trustees (because of staggered terms) were appointed to one-year terms only. The first official village election was held in April 1959, at which time a new president, Harry P. Keeley Jr., and three new trustees were elected.

=== Development ===
In 1975, Kildeer established a part-time police department. The department was made full-time in 1988.

In 1989, the position of full-time village administrator was established.

Growth in the area began to accelerate, and developers annexed their properties to neighboring communities, enlarging their borders and virtually landlocking Kildeer. Lacking the ability to offer utilities as an inducement for developers to annex to Kildeer, the village negotiated other concessions so as to expand the village limits. The village approved a subdivision called Beacon Hill, consisting of houses on smaller lots but with considerable open space in and around the development. Through this, Kildeer annexed land, effectively being able to influence other nearby development. These homes are served by sewers connected to the Lake County sewage treatment facility.

In 1990 the village negotiated capacity in Lake Zurich's trunkline to the Lake County sewage treatment facility. This would allow the central portion of Kildeer to have the ability to create sewer districts. Since establishing the first sewer facility plan in 1988, Kildeer has approved subdivisions designed with sewer infrastructure to accommodate future connections of upstream developments.

Over the decades, higher density developments have been established surrounding Kildeer, while it remains an island of rural countryside. Some residents want to preserve the rural atmosphere while others prefer increased services and programs that require the need for new sources of revenue. Other nearby communities offer urban services and municipal recreation, and Kildeer offers open space and a more self-sufficient private lifestyle.

== Geography ==
According to the 2021 census gazetteer files, Kildeer has a total area of 4.43 square miles (11.47 km^{2}), of which 4.23 square miles (10.96 km^{2}) (or 95.55%) is land and 0.20 square miles (0.52 km^{2}) (or 4.45%) is water.

== Demographics ==
Historical population
Census	Pop.	Note	%±
1960	173		—
1970	643		271.7%
1980	1,609		150.2%
1990	2,257		40.3%
2000	3,460		53.3%
2010	3,968		14.7%
2020	4,091		3.1%
U.S. Decennial Census; 2010 2020

=== Racial and ethnic composition ===
Kildeer village, Illinois – Racial and ethnic composition Note: the US Census treats Hispanic/Latino as an ethnic category. This table excludes Latinos from the racial categories and assigns them to a separate category. Hispanics/Latinos may be of any race.
Race / Ethnicity (NH = Non-Hispanic)	Pop 2000	Pop 2010	Pop 2020	% 2000	% 2010	% 2020
White alone (NH)	3,188	3,316	3,073	92.14%	83.57%	75.12%
Black or African American alone (NH)	27	34	19	0.78%	0.86%	0.46%
Native American or Alaska Native alone (NH)	0	0	4	0.00%	0.00%	0.10%
Asian alone (NH)	148	440	673	4.28%	11.09%	16.45%
Native Hawaiian or Pacific Islander alone (NH)	0	2	2	0.00%	0.05%	0.05%
Other race alone (NH)	0	0	7	0.00%	0.00%	0.17%
Mixed race or Multiracial (NH)	17	49	133	0.49%	1.23%	3.25%
Hispanic or Latino (any race)	80	127	180	2.31%	3.20%	4.40%
Total	3,460	3,968	4,091	100.00%	100.00%	100.00%

=== 2020 census ===
As of the 2020 census, Kildeer had a population of 4,091 and 1,184 families. The population density was 924.10 inhabitants per square mile (356.80/km^{2}), and the housing-unit density was 312.63 per square mile (120.71/km^{2}).

The median age was 45.0 years. 25.1% of residents were under the age of 18 and 14.5% of residents were 65 years of age or older. For every 100 females there were 103.4 males, and for every 100 females age 18 and over there were 101.1 males age 18 and over.

100.0% of residents lived in urban areas, while 0.0% lived in rural areas.

There were 1,330 households in Kildeer, of which 44.4% had children under the age of 18 living in them. Of all households, 83.7% were married-couple households, 6.0% were households with a male householder and no spouse or partner present, and 8.2% were households with a female householder and no spouse or partner present. About 7.6% of all households were made up of individuals and 4.0% had someone living alone who was 65 years of age or older.

There were 1,384 housing units, of which 3.9% were vacant. The homeowner vacancy rate was 1.7% and the rental vacancy rate was 7.9%.

=== Income and poverty ===
The median income for a household in the village was $212,500, and the median income for a family was $225,610. Males had a median income of $117,143 versus $82,670 for females. The per capita income for the village was $80,875. About 1.4% of families and 2.5% of the population were below the poverty line, including 2.8% of those under age 18 and 0.0% of those age 65 or over.

== Education ==
The village is served by three public school districts: Community Unit School District 95, Kildeer Countryside Community Consolidated School District 96, and Consolidated High School District 125.

== Infrastructure ==
Highways include Illinois Route 53.
