= Deer Park, Illinois =

- Village
- logo

- Location of Deer Park in Lake County and Cook County, Illinois

- Location within Chicago metropolitan area Location within Illinois Location within the United States
- Coordinates: 42°10′08″N 88°06′20″W
- Country: United States
- State: Illinois
- Counties: Cook, Lake
- Townships: Ela, Cuba, Palatine
- Incorporated: 1957

Government
  - Type: Trustee-village

Area
  - Total: 3.76 sq mi (9.73 km^{2})
  - Land: 3.65 sq mi (9.46 km^{2})
  - Water: 0.10 sq mi (0.26 km^{2})
- Elevation: 863 ft (263 m)

Population (2020)
  - Total: 3,681
  - Density: 1,007.3/sq mi (388.91/km^{2})

Standard of living (2007-11)
  - Per capita income: $63,689
  - Median home value: $593,000
- Time zone: UTC-6 (CST)
  - Summer (DST): UTC-5 (CDT)
- ZIP code(s): 60010
- Area codes: 847, 224
- FIPS code: 17-19083
- GNIS feature ID: 2398704
- Website: villageofdeerpark.com

Deer Park is a village in Lake and Cook counties, Illinois, United States. Per the 2020 census, the population was 3,681. The village is one of the few left in the Chicago area that enjoy a green belt which is bordered by two large natural areas providing outdoor recreation and open space. The village is home to popular shopping and dining destinations: Deer Park Town Center and the Town Center Promenade. The town is also home to the Vehe Farm, an Illinois Centennial Farm.

Residential zoning is mainly single-family homes with lot sizes of 1-acre (4,000 m^{2}) or more. Upscale townhomes are available near the Deer Park Center. The Metra/Chicago & Northwestern train line provides commuter service to Chicago with stations in nearby Barrington and Palatine.

== Geography ==
According to the 2021 census gazetteer files, Deer Park has a total area of 3.76 square miles (9.74 km^{2}), of which 3.65 square miles (9.45 km^{2}) (or 97.31%) is land and 0.10 square miles (0.26 km^{2}) (or 2.69%) is water.

== Demographics ==
Historical population
Census	Pop.	Note	%±
1960	476		—
1970	726		52.5%
1980	1,368		88.4%
1990	2,887		111.0%
2000	3,102		7.4%
2010	3,200		3.2%
2020	3,681		15.0%
U.S. Decennial Census; 2010 2020

=== Racial and ethnic composition ===
Deer Park village, Illinois – Racial and ethnic composition Note: the US Census treats Hispanic/Latino as an ethnic category. This table excludes Latinos from the racial categories and assigns them to a separate category. Hispanics/Latinos may be of any race.
Race / Ethnicity (NH = Non-Hispanic)	Pop 2000	Pop 2010	Pop 2020	% 2000	% 2010	% 2020
White alone (NH)	2,935	2,891	3,119	94.62%	90.34%	84.73%
Black or African American alone (NH)	18	28	23	0.58%	0.88%	0.62%
Native American or Alaska Native alone (NH)	1	0	6	0.03%	0.00%	0.16%
Asian alone (NH)	75	136	288	2.42%	4.25%	7.82%
Native Hawaiian or Pacific Islander alone (NH)	1	1	0	0.03%	0.03%	0.00%
Other race alone (NH)	5	0	5	0.16%	0.00%	0.14%
Mixed race or Multiracial (NH)	20	34	118	0.64%	1.06%	3.21%
Hispanic or Latino (any race)	47	110	122	1.52%	3.44%	3.31%
Total	3,102	3,200	3,681	100.00%	100.00%	100.00%

=== 2020 census ===
As of the 2020 census, Deer Park had a population of 3,681. The population density was 980.29 inhabitants per square mile (378.49/km^{2}). There were 1,451 housing units at an average density of 386.42 per square mile (149.20/km^{2}).

The median age was 48.1 years. 21.7% of residents were under the age of 18 and 22.7% were 65 years of age or older. For every 100 females, there were 95.6 males, and for every 100 females age 18 and over, there were 95.5 males age 18 and over. 100.0% of residents lived in urban areas, while 0.0% lived in rural areas.

There were 1,329 households, of which 32.4% had children under the age of 18 living in them. Of all households, 72.1% were married-couple households, 11.0% were households with a male householder and no spouse or partner present, and 14.8% were households with a female householder and no spouse or partner present. About 18.7% of all households were made up of individuals, and 8.0% had someone living alone who was 65 years of age or older.

There were 1,451 housing units, of which 8.4% were vacant. The homeowner vacancy rate was 1.2% and the rental vacancy rate was 17.8%.

=== Income and poverty ===
The median income for a household in the village was $161,422, and the median income for a family was $192,708. Males had a median income of $117,120 versus $76,635 for females. The per capita income for the village was $73,578. About 0.3% of families and 1.3% of the population were below the poverty line, including 0.4% of those under age 18 and 5.0% of those age 65 or over.

== Education ==
There are no public schools in Deer Park, but it is served by either Isaac Fox Elementary School, Lake Zurich Middle School South and Lake Zurich High School or Arnett Lines Elementary School, Barrington Middle School Prairie Campus and Barrington High School.
