= Des Plaines River Trail =

Recreational trail in Illinois, United States

Coordinates: 42.03167°N 87.87450°W

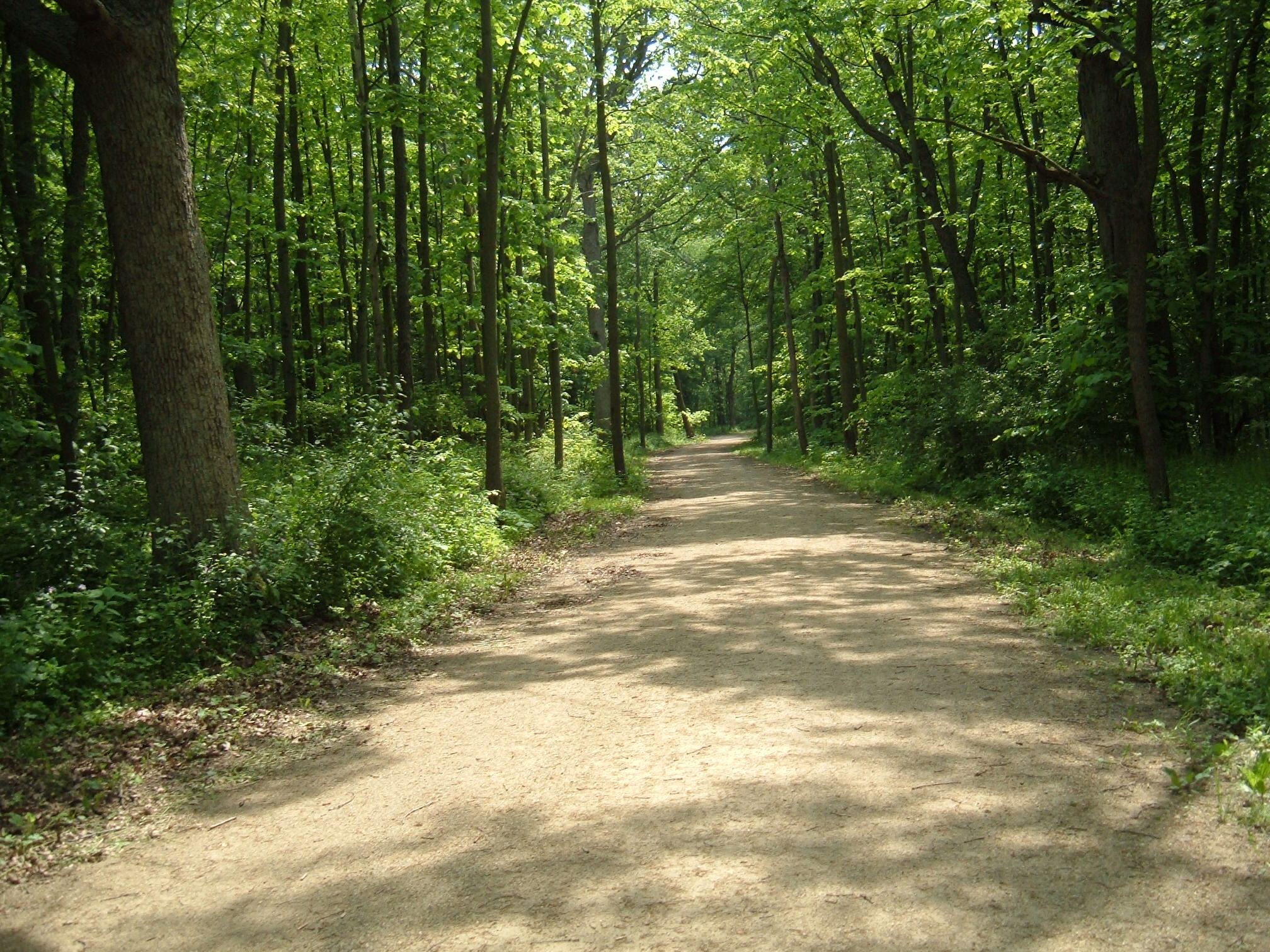
- Typical section of the Des Plaines River Trail in Lake County, Illinois
- Length: 56 mi (90 km)
- Completed: 2015; 11 years ago
- Trailheads: Des Plaines
- Use: bicycling, inline skating, walking, cross country skiing
- Difficulty: easy, level
- Surface: asphalt, crushed stone, concrete

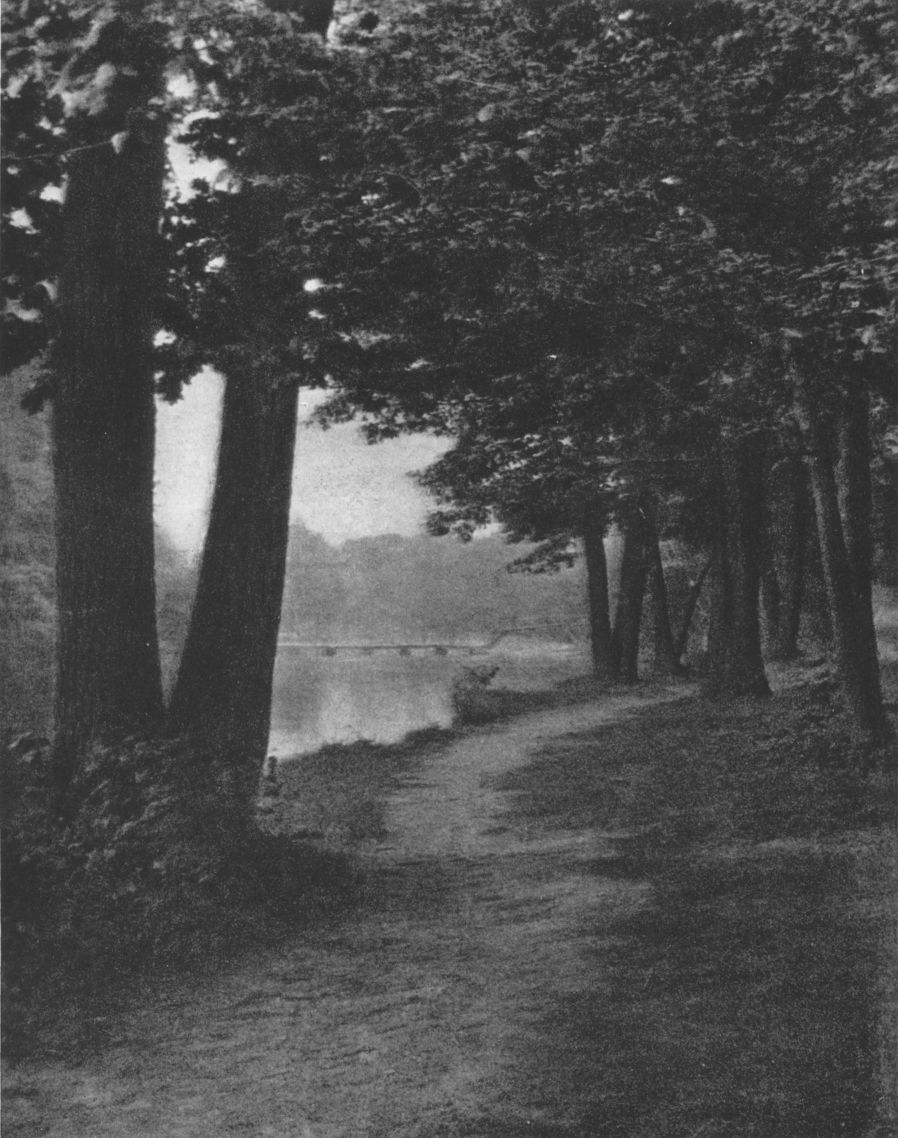
The trail in 1922

The Des Plaines River Trail is a recreational multiuse trail that follows the course of the Des Plaines River through most of Lake and part of Cook County in northeast Illinois in the United States. This trail connects with the North Branch Trail and Green Bay Trail.

Trail uses include hiking/walking, bicycling, equestrian, and even winter cross country skiing and snowmobiling (conditions permitting). Since much of the trail lies in the flood plain along the Des Plaines River, sections of the trail are occasionally closed due to flooding during periods of heavy rain. Though not all sections of the trail connect directly, there is a section more than 31 miles (50 km) long running through Lake County starting at Russell Road along the Wisconsin/Illinois state line and running south into Cook County. There are additional disconnected sections south of the town of Des Plaines.

Much of the Des Plaines River Trail runs through a protected corridor made up of a series of public lands that are part of the Lake County Forest Preserve District and the Cook County Forest Preserve District. The numerous forest preserves provide additional recreational opportunities along the trail. Underpasses and bridges are used to facilitate many (not all) of the major road crossings (The underpasses are highly prone to flooding during the spring).

Cook County Forest Preserve rangers give lectures at various time during the year. There is a nature house where forest animals reside for the public to view. The trails are very calm and beautiful and especially in the fall when the leaves change colors. A peak time to walk the trails is the second or third week in October. You can picnic right next to the Des Plaines River.

== Towns (north to south) ==
Towns connected by or adjacent to the Des Plaines River Trail:

- Wadsworth
- Gurnee
- Libertyville
- Mettawa
- Lincolnshire
- Riverwoods
- Wheeling
- Des Plaines
- Park Ridge
- Schiller Park
- Chicago
- River Grove

== Recreational facilities ==
The Des Plaines River Trail contains many recreational facilities, including:

- Parks and Preserves, such as the Van Patten Woods, and the Gurnee Woods.
- Boating, including rafts, flat bottom boats, and canoes
- Fishing
- Equestrian facilities
- Dog park

== Animal life ==
The trail is home to numerous forms of wildlife, among them:

- Birds, such as blue herons, cranes, woodpeckers, red-tailed hawks, and peregrine falcons.
- Fish, including bass, bluegill, carp, catfish, crappie, northern pike, and sunfish.
- Mammals, including beavers, bobcats, chipmunks, coyotes, deer, foxes, muskrats, opossums, skunks, and squirrels.
- Invertebrates, such as the tiger beetle, metalmark butterfly, velvet ant, crayfish, water strider, and dragonfly.
- Reptiles and amphibians, including the garter snake, (eastern massasauga), box turtle, softshell turtle, and leopard frog.

== Plant life ==
The trail contains several different ecosystems: plains, woodlands, savannas, and wetlands. In these ecosystems are many varieties of trees, tall grasses and wildflowers, creating a rich abundance of plant life.

== Safety ==
When traveling along the trail during warmer months, hikers should take proper preventative measures for mosquitoes and ticks. Mosquitoes can carry some forms of encephalitis as well as West Nile virus. Ticks in the region have been known to carry Lyme disease.

Although the river and associated ponds are considered fresh water, swimming or consumption is generally not recommended. Most of the river and its tributaries are subject to runoff/drainage as well as heavy usage by local wildfowl, which may cause chemical and/or bacterial contamination.
