= Illinois Route 22 =

State highway in northeastern Illinois, US

Illinois Route 22
- Half Day Road
- IL 22 highlighted in red

Route information
- Maintained by IDOT
- Length: 19.7 mi (31.7 km)
- Existed: November 5, 1918–present

Major junctions
- West end: US 14 in Fox River Grove
- US 12 in Lake Zurich; US 45 / IL 21 in Lincolnshire I-94 Toll near Lincolnshire
- East end: US 41 in Highland Park

Location
- Country: United States
- State: Illinois
- Counties: McHenry, Lake

Highway system
- Illinois State Highway System; Interstate; US; State; Tollways; Scenic
← IL 21	→ IL 23

Illinois Route 22, also known as Half Day Road for part of its length, is an east–west state highway in northeastern Illinois. It runs from U.S. Route 14 (Northwest Highway) in Fox River Grove to U.S. Route 41 (Skokie Highway) in Highland Park. It travels a distance of 19.7 miles (31.7 km) and is one of the few roads that runs almost entirely across southern Lake County while also providing access to southeastern McHenry County. Throughout its length, it shifts between two and four lanes as it passes through a frequently changing setting of scenic forestry and smaller populations, as well as busy intersections and larger developments.

It originally started as a massive loop around the Chicago area, however it has retained its current, much shorter route ever since 1937. During the 1990s, it became the subject of much concern for local residents regarding expansion which slowed capacity expansion. By the late 2000s, the delays have come and gone and it has emerged as a state route that has been built to deal with heavy traffic.

== Route description ==
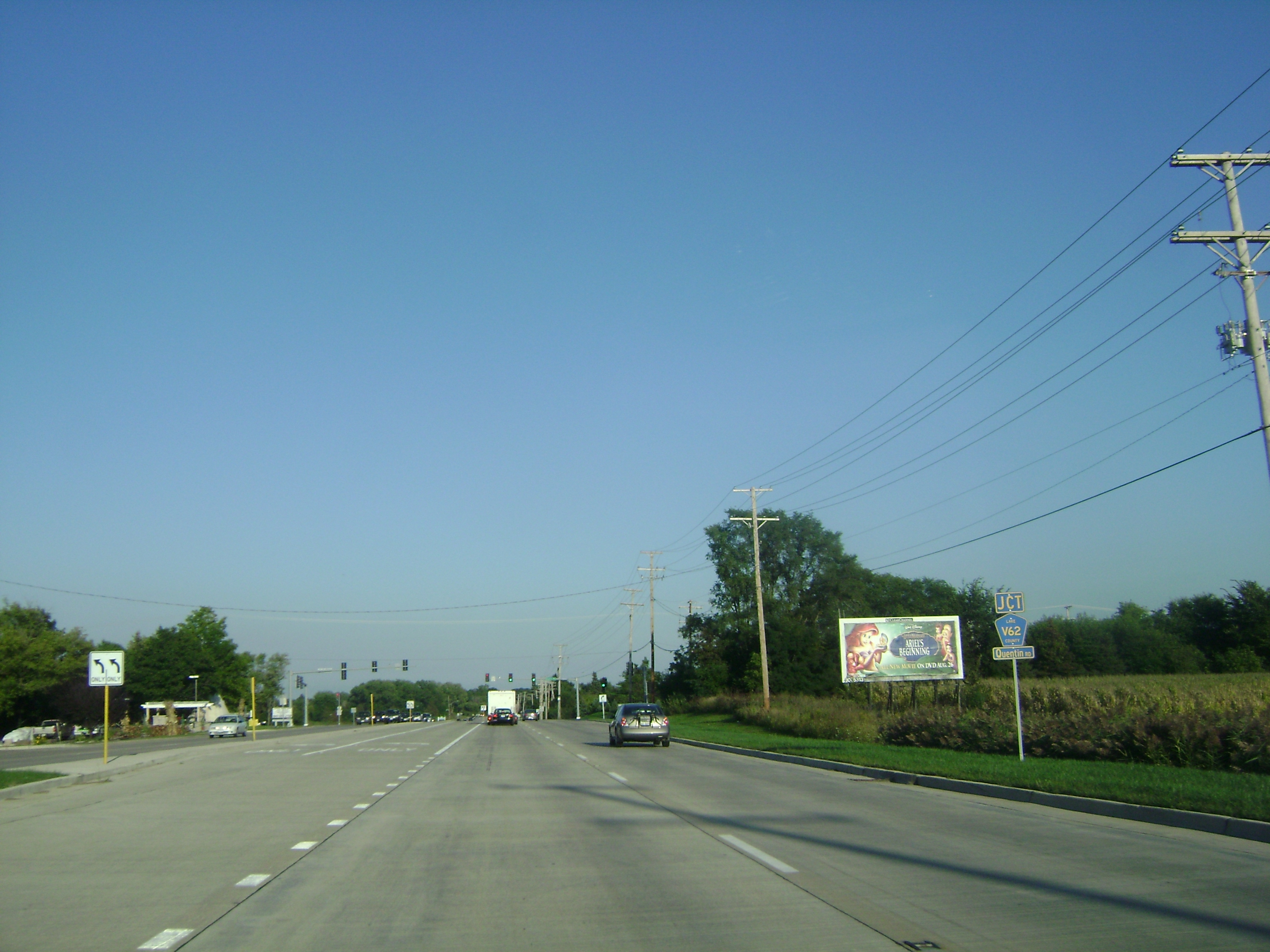
Eastbound IL 22 approaching Quentin Road.

Beginning at its western terminus at a commercially developed intersection with U.S. Route 14 (Northwest Highway), Illinois 22 starts out as a two lane road in Fox River Grove, just inside the McHenry County line. It quickly becomes much more rural as it enters the city of Lake Barrington and Lake County about a half mile east. The Advocate Good Shepherd Hospital and Stonehenge Golf Club on the north side are all that lie in this wooded area of sporadic residential development. Heading into North Barrington, the road continues its journey as it crosses paths with Illinois Route 59 (Hough Street) until soon after, when it nears the more densely populated area of Lake Zurich.

It becomes a four lane road as it approaches commercial development and the busy intersection of U.S. Route 12 (Rand Road). Shortly after, it proceeds to briefly take a northeast direction while it bypasses the narrow, downtown area of Lake Zurich, including a grade separation at the Elgin, Joliet and Eastern Railway (EJ&E). Returning due east, the road travels through a mix of light industrial and commercial developments to the north, and residential to the south before intersecting with Quentin Road. This is where, for a short distance, Illinois 22 runs past the southern edge of Forest Lake on the north side and heads into Kildeer which is largely on the south side. This all takes place while it narrows back down to two lanes near two housing developments and returns to a rural setting with light forestry. The road then passes by the Kemper Lakes Business Center, Kemper Lakes Golf Club, and the Egret Marsh and then enters Long Grove. Soon after passing a mixed-use development on the northwest corner at an intersection with Old McHenry Road, it briefly enters a denser forest area before widening back to four lanes while again passing by residential developments.

After a major intersection with Illinois Route 83, the route takes on the name Half Day Road and enters Buffalo Grove. It passes by more neighborhoods, a shopping plaza on the northeast corner of Buffalo Grove Road, the Arboretum Club, and the Prairie View Metra Station next to the at-grade North Central Service tracks. The road then enters Lincolnshire and heads nearby the Stevenson High School and an office complex before intersecting with Illinois Route 21/U.S. Route 45 (Milwaukee Avenue), with northwest corner containing a gas station, the northeast a grocery store, and the other two being undeveloped. It then travels by Crane's Landing Golf Course, near the Half Day and Wright Woods Forest Preserves, and goes over the Des Plaines River as it once again encounters a wooded area which surrounds nearby homes. Soon the road intersects and forms a diamond interchange with Interstate 94 (Tri-State Tollway); many office complexes and corporate buildings, such as Hewitt Associates, are located nearby.

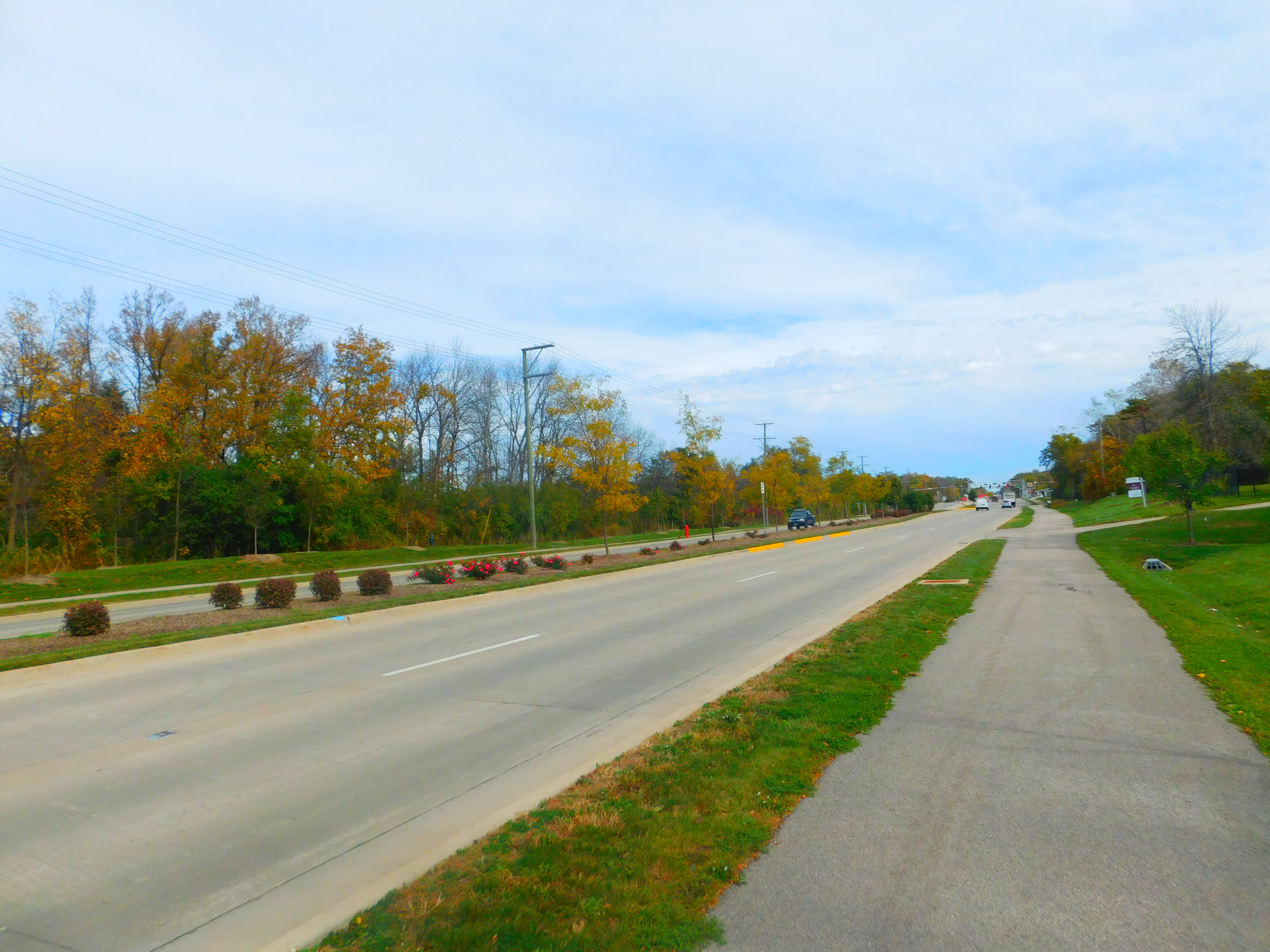
IL 22 in Bannockburn

On the east side of the interchange, Illinois 22 enters Bannockburn as it passes near Trinity International University as well as some upper class real estate areas. The road next approaches the at-grade Milwaukee District North Line tracks and major junction with Illinois Route 43 (Waukegan Road) while passing a shopping area on the southeast corner of that intersection. It then arrives in the last city on its journey, Highland Park, where it heads near the Prairie Wolf Slough Forest Preserve. Shortly after, it nears its end as it goes under the grade separated Union Pacific North Line tracks and a pedestrian crossing before terminating at the well traveled, at-grade intersection of U.S. Route 41 (Skokie Highway); Half Day Road continues east without a state route designation.

== History ==
=== Early history ===
Half Day Road takes its name from Aptakisic, a local Potawatomi chief who allied himself with White settlers in the area. The chief's name meant "sun at the meridian" or "half day". After his removal to the vicinity of Elmont, Kansas after the 1833 Treaty of Chicago, settlers applied his name first to an inn, then to the unincorporated town of Half Day, and finally to the road passing through the town. A widespread local legend states that prior to the 1900s, it supposedly took a half day to travel from the area to Chicago, and that this is the source of the name; however, this story has no support in the historical record.

In 1918, State Bond Issue (SBI) Route 22 started off as an outer beltway around the Chicago area, similar to the shape of Interstate 294. It was even referred to in Illinois road maps, as early as 1931, as the "22 Loop". In those days, it traveled in a "C" formation from the city of Lake Forest to Crystal Lake to Aurora to Joliet, and then east to the border near Indiana. If it took the same path today, it would travel the routes of U.S. 41, modern Illinois 22, U.S. 14, Illinois 31, and U.S. 30. By 1935 it had largely been changed to its current route, except for a small section extending east of U.S. 41.

=== Recent history ===
Until the early 2000s and despite heavy traffic, Illinois 22 generally remained a two lane road. The only sections that were four lanes were the intersections of Illinois 83, Buffalo Grove Road, Milwaukee Avenue, Interstate 94, Illinois 43, and U.S. 41. The lengthy two lane gaps in between those intersections, as well as the rest of Illinois 22 were heavily discussed for expansion starting in the early 1990s. These discussions included plans that called for additional lanes on its entire length from U.S. 14 to U.S. 41, including widening a section from U.S. 12 to Milwaukee Avenue to six lanes. Also mentioned was a bypass around the narrow, downtown area of Lake Zurich.

It became apparent that a major hold up with these projects was the citizens and local officials of Lincolnshire. Going back to 1971, the section of road from Illinois 83 to Interstate 94 had been known to be opposed for widening by the residents of Lincolnshire. The dispute continued even after funding was secured for the project. This continued until 2002 when an agreement was finally reached between Lincolnshire and the Illinois Department of Transportation (IDOT) that led the way for expansion to proceed. Notice was also given around then that plans to widen Illinois 22 west of U.S. 12, through North Barrington and Lake Barrington had been dropped. In December 2003, the $12.5 million of roadwork which consisted of approximately 1.5 miles of widened concrete lanes from west of Interstate 94 to east of Milwaukee Avenue was officially over and the lanes were opened to traffic.

In 1994, the Lake Zurich Village Board approved a bypass around its narrow downtown. This project followed a similar time frame as the Lincolnshire work, however, it was met with a much less intense opposition. The entire process of planning through securing funding was complete by 2003 when state budget cutbacks delayed construction by a year. Construction was completed by 2006, and on October 20, 2006, Illinois 22 was rerouted from Main Street onto the four lane $27 million bypass around Lake Zurich. Several homes and business were removed for the new roadway, which now featured a grade separation at the Elgin, Joliet and Eastern Railway. By the end of 2006, all surrounding major roadwork had been completed; with landscaping continuing into 2007. After years of delay, the entire project was complete, with four concrete lanes from west of U.S. 12 to east of Quentin Road. This included intersection expansions along the way, highlighted by the five lane approaches with dual left turn lanes in both directions at Quentin Road.

An additional three-mile section of Illinois 22 from Illinois 83 to Milwaukee Avenue, primarily located in Buffalo Grove, was another closely related project that was once again met with similar delays and concerns. Long Grove got on board in May 2005 and approved any widening between its eastern city limits and Illinois 83. Roadwork began in the fall on the two-year project, and in September 2007 it was finished; complete with four concrete lanes and a center grassy median. Again, intersection expansions were also made, this time adding dual left turn lanes to both east–west approaches at Illinois 83 and Buffalo Grove Road.

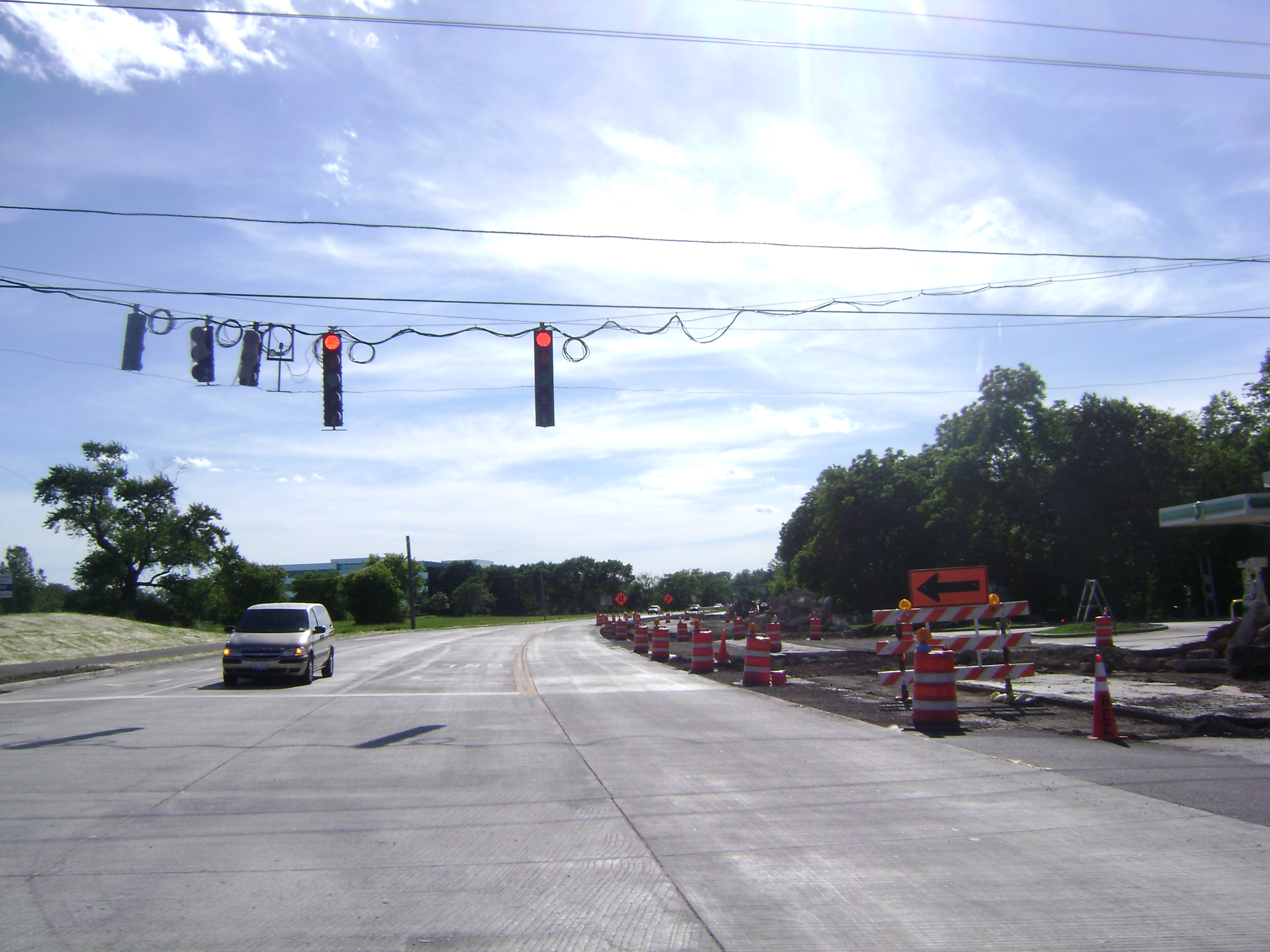
Looking west at Milwaukee Avenue during intersection expansion. (June 2010)

There was one final widening project that was worked on in 2005, this time located mostly in Bannockburn. East of Illinois 43 for about a half mile, Illinois 22 was widened to four lanes while in the process a nearby bridge was replaced.

Beginning in 2008, a bridge replacement and expansion project got underway on Illinois 22 at the interchange with Interstate 94. This was necessary for the tollway which travels underneath to be widened to eight lanes. The old bridge, which was five lanes wide, was rebuilt with one that is eight lanes and includes full length dual left turn lanes in both directions. The bulk of the work was completed by December 2009, however both sets of dual left turn lanes were not in operation until the following spring.

In August 2009, construction began on an intersection expansion project at Milwaukee Avenue in Lincolnshire. Its outdated design was a gap in the stretch of recently completed roadwork in the surrounding area. The improvements on Illinois 22 have widened the east–west approaches at this major intersection to five lanes, with the new additions being dual left turn lanes as well as right turn lanes. The new lanes were opened for the first time on October 15, 2010.

In 2011, a 2.1 mile, $13.2 million project in Bannockburn and Highland Park got underway. It extended from east of I-94 to west of US-41, with the exception of the small section that was previously worked on in 2005. IL-22 was reconstructed and widened to four lanes. The new lanes were initially opened by the end of 2012, with landscaping and finishing work carrying into 2013.

== Future ==
Most of Illinois 22 has been expanded to four lanes, but there are several gaps remaining. As of 2002, plans for the section west of U.S. 12 have been put on hold indefinitely. Finally, the remaining section located primarily in Long Grove from east of Quentin Road to west of Illinois 83 is also in the works for the near future at an estimated cost of $38.5 million. This project, which is now supported by Long Grove, has suffered similarly mentioned delays, but is also closely related to yet another long delayed project; the Illinois Route 53 extension. If the extension, which is a limited-access expressway and currently terminates three miles south at Lake-Cook Road, were ever built, it would pass through this area, where there would likely be an interchange. The project has been long delayed over the decades so it appears that this section of Illinois 22 may get widened as part of a separate project.

== Major intersections ==
County	Location	mi	km	Destinations	Notes
McHenry	Fox River Grove	0.0	0.0	US 14	
Lake	North Barrington	3.8	6.1	IL 59 (Hough Street, Barrington Road)	
Lake	Lake Zurich	5.3	8.5	US 12 (Rand Road)	
Lake	Long Grove	11.5	18.5	IL 83	
Lake	Lincolnshire	14.5	23.3	US 45 / IL 21 (Milwaukee Avenue)	
Lake	Lincolnshire–Bannockburn line	16.7	26.9	I-94 Toll (Tri-State Tollway) – Indiana, Wisconsin	Diamond interchange; I-94 exit 21
Lake	Bannockburn	18.1	29.1	IL 43 (Waukegan Road)	
Lake	Highland Park	19.6	31.5	US 41 (Skokie Valley Road)	
1.000 mi = 1.609 km; 1.000 km = 0.621 mi
