= Edward L. Ryerson Conservation Area =

Public land in Illinois, United States

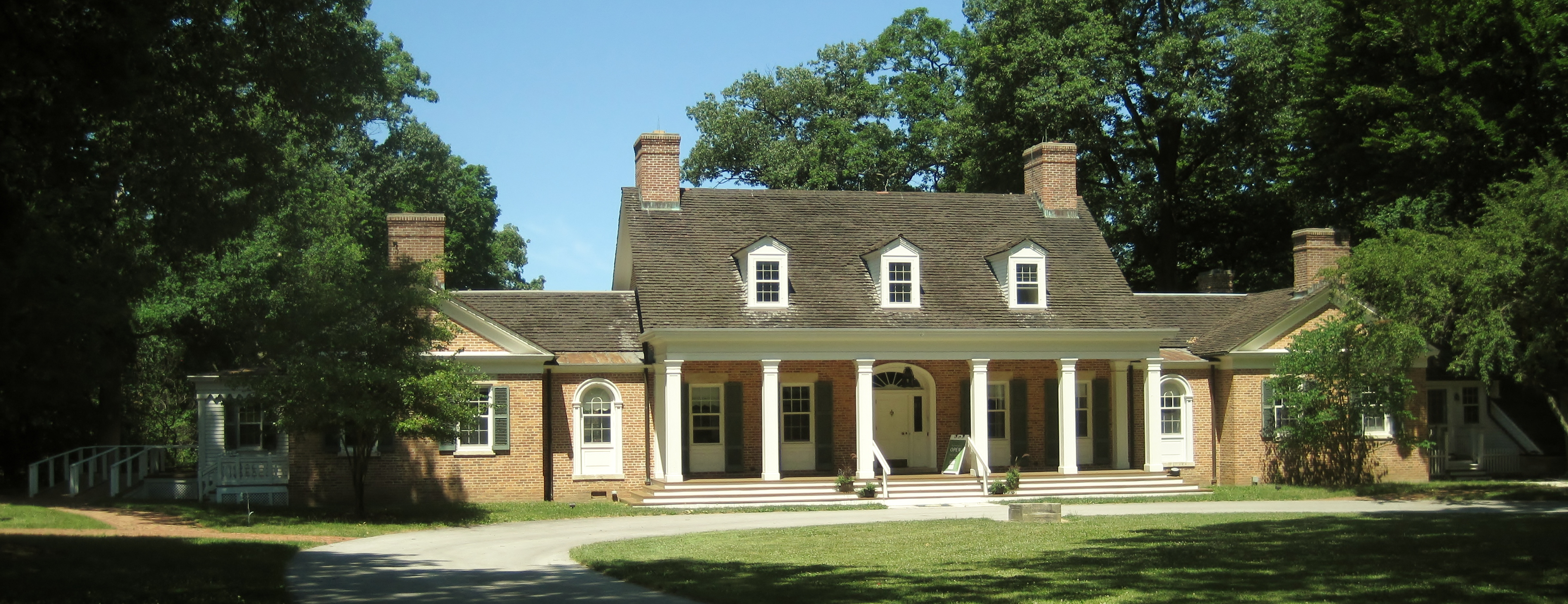
- Ryerson's country house

- Location within Illinois
- Location: Riverwoods, Lake County, Illinois, United States
- Coordinates: 42°10′39″N 87°54′39″W
- Established: 1966
- Named for: Edward L. Ryerson
- Governing body: Lake County Forest Preserves
- Website: Edward L. Ryerson Conservation Area

The Edward L. Ryerson Conservation Area is a protected area and historic district in Riverwoods, Illinois, United States. The area was a weekend getaway for businessman Edward L. Ryerson, who built a cabin there in 1928. He built three other cabins for friends, and had a country house built in 1942. It is representative of the type of getaways used by successful Chicagoans who sought the tranquil surroundings of the Des Plaines River. The Ryersons donated the property to the Lake County Forest Preserve district for public use. 471 acres (191 ha) are recognized as the Edward L. Ryerson Area Historic District.

== History ==
Native American tribes with a history of settlement and activity along the Des Plaines River include the United Nation of Chippewa, Ottawa, and Potawatomi. The 1833 Treaty of Chicago resulted in significant growth in European settlement of this area.

The Des Plaines River was first used by settlers as a recreational retreat in the early 1920s. Three cabins were built along the river between 1923 and 1928 for Frederick A. Preston, Everett L. Millard, and Cecil Barnes. All were wealthy businessman who lived in the North Shore. Barnes was a friend of the Ryerson family and introduced the cabin idea to them. Ryerson purchased 28 acres (11 ha) just west of the Barnes property and built his own cabin in 1928. Ryerson had just become the president of the Ryerson Steel Company upon the death of his father. He was also the president of the Chicago Council of Social Agencies.

In 1938, the owners of a large, adjacent tract of land announced that they intended to sell their property. Ryerson was concerned that the 250-acre (100 ha) lot would be developed, thus threatening the peaceful surroundings of the cabin. Ryerson, now President of the Inland Steel Company, elected to purchase the property himself and develop a farm. Ryerson commissioned Edwin Hill Clark, a North Shore architect, to design the property. Clark is confirmed to have designed a dairy barn and a farm equipment building; it is assumed due to design similarities that Clark also designed the farmhouse and two sheds. Ryerson purchased a herd of Guernsey cattle, but soon found milking to be too tedious. He sold the herd and instead purchased beef cattle, hogs, and Arabian horses.

As the Ryersons awaited the development of their farm, the 1938 New England hurricane destroyed "Aucoot Haven", the family vacation home in Marion, Massachusetts. Ryerson decided to build a new country house on his large property. Ryerson commissioned Ambrose Cramer to design a Greek Revival inspired by the Anson and Orson Rogers Houses in Marengo. Cramer was chosen because he lived in Galena, a city with many Greek Revival residences. Furthermore, Cramer's half-sister was married to Ryerson's brother.

=== Other cabins ===
Hermon Dunlap "Dutch" Smith, the vice president of Marsh & McLennan, purchased 8 acres (3.2 ha) to the east of Barnes' property. He built a cabin near the river in 1935. Smith enjoyed the surroundings so much that he wrote The Des Plaines River 1673–1940: A Brief Consideration of its Names and History, published in 1940. Architect Ambrose Cramer built a cabin in 1940 while designing Ryerson's house. However, he never used it, instead retiring to Maine in 1942. His cabin was moved north of Aptakisic Road in the 1970s. Chauncey Borland, a real estate executive, built a cabin on 15 acres (6.1 ha) southeast of Millard's in 1941. Artist Ivan Albright built a cabin in the 1950s.

=== Forest preserve ===
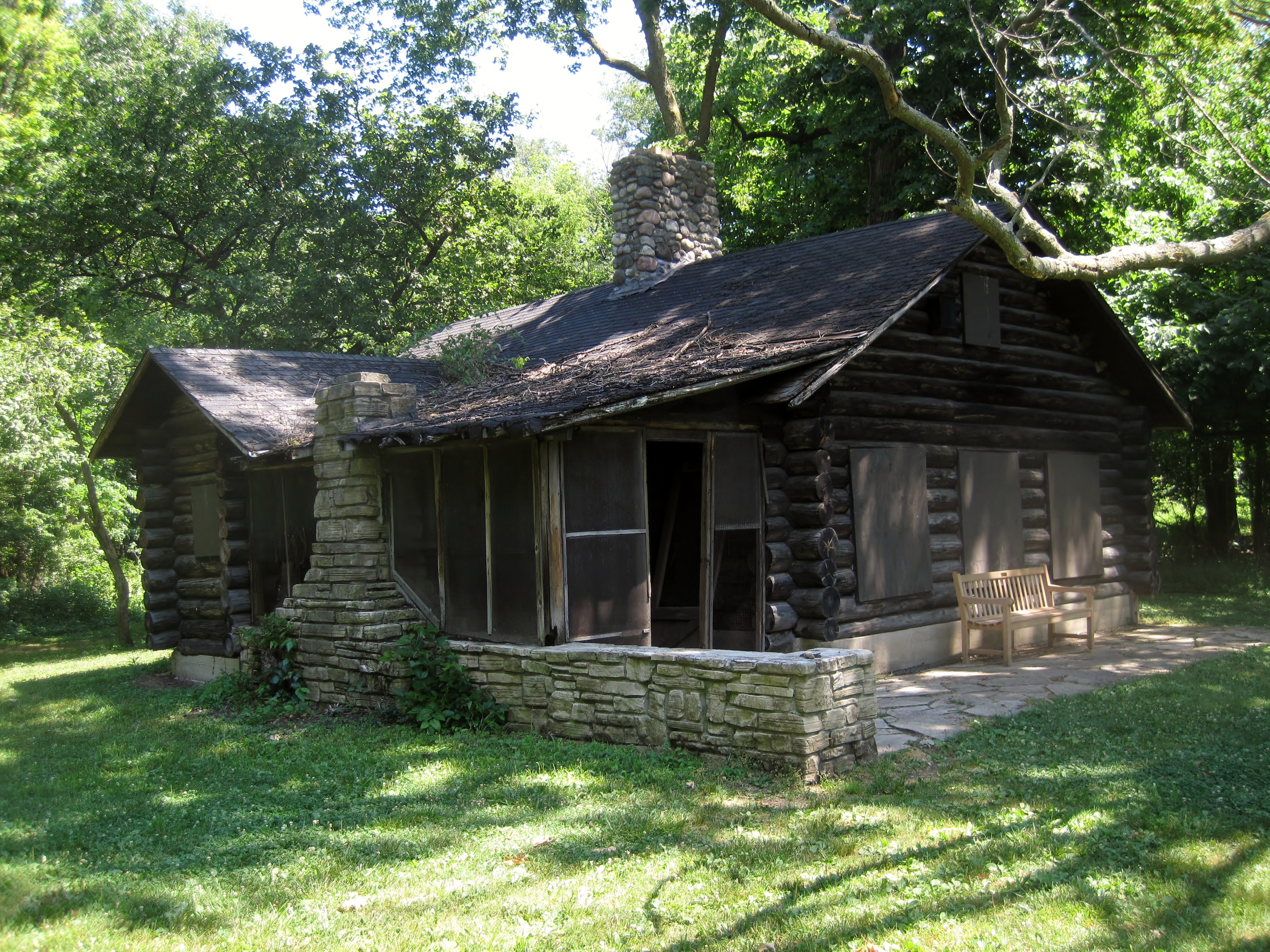
Ryerson's cabin

The Ryerson family built a winter home in Palm Desert, California. By the 1950s, the Ryersons began to vacation there instead of in the cabin retreat. Ryerson donated 85 acres (34 ha) north of Aptakisic Road to the newly established Lake County Forest Preserve District in 1966. The total Ryerson donations eventually totaled 257 acres (104 ha). Ryerson successfully convinced the other landholders to donate their properties. Albright sold his property in 1968. Henry Preston, son of Frederick, sold 15 acres (6.1 ha) and the cabin to the in 1969. David Dangler, who had come into possession of the Millard property in the 1950s, likewise sold 7 acres (2.8 ha) to the district the next year. Borland donated his acreage in 1985; the forest preserve moved his cabin north of Aptakisic Road for use as an interpretive center. The Millard, Barnes, and Preston cabins have been demolished. By 1972, the Forest Preserve occupied 550 acres (220 ha).

Today, the forest preserve is 565 acres (229 ha). The preserve includes 6.5 miles (10.5 km) of trails for hikers and cross-country skiers. The 2.5-mile (4.0 km) More than half of the land is recognized as an Illinois Nature Preserve.

== Historic district ==
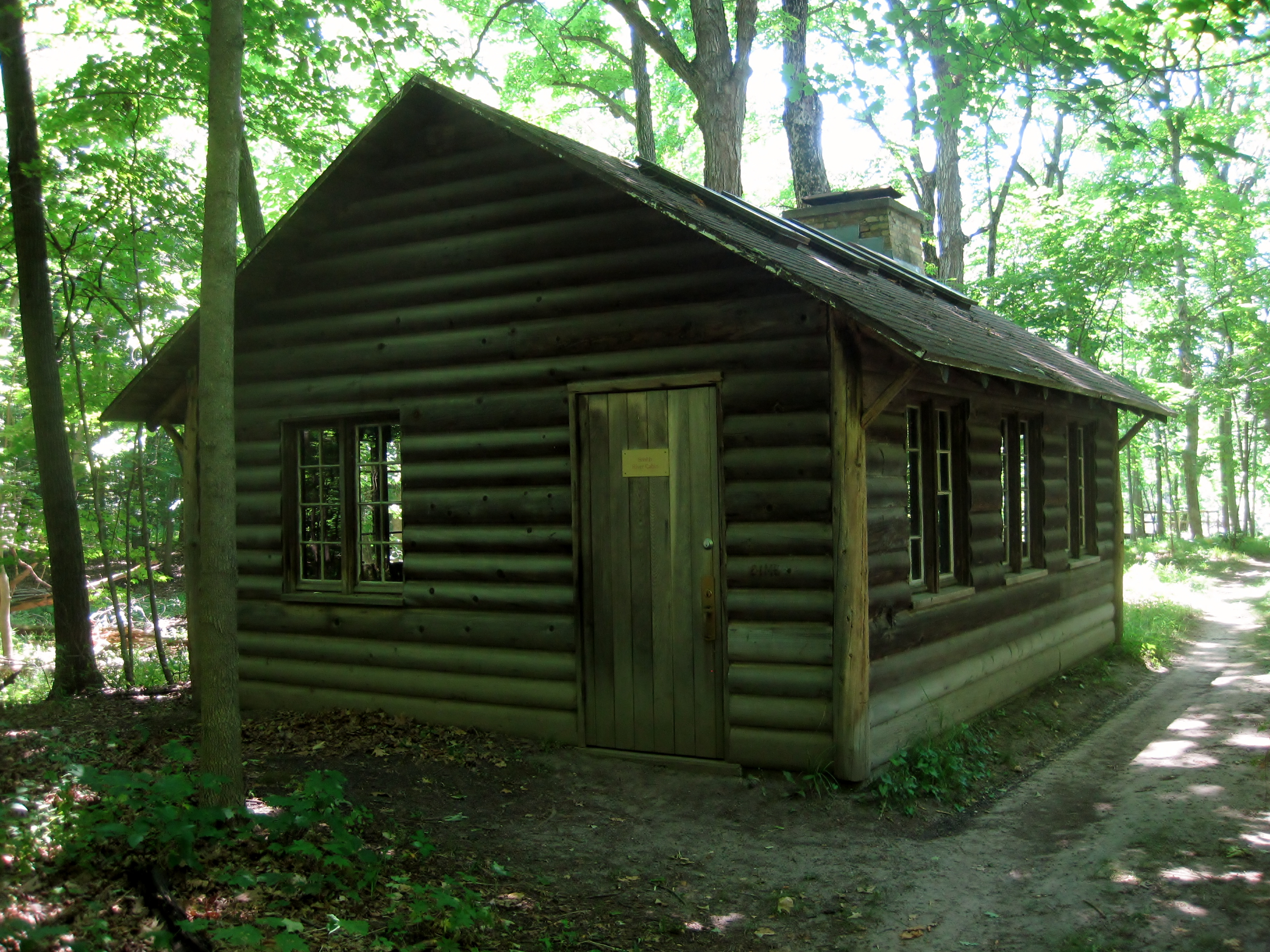
Hermon Dunlap Smith cabin

On February 29, 1996, 471 acres (191 ha) of the forest preserve was recognized by the National Park Service as the Edward L. Ryerson Area Historic District, a listing on the National Register of Historic Places. These lands only include the land owned by Ryerson by 1945 and exclude land purchased from the Hess family. There are ten buildings, one site, one structure, and three objects on the property contributing to its historic fabric. These buildings include most of the farmstead and the country house. The Borland and Millard cabins, used for education programs for decades, were sold and removed in 2022 to be replaced by a newly constructed education center. All remaining cabins, including the Ryerson 1928 cabin which had fallen into disrepair, were demolished by 2022 due to the comparative cost of making them ADA compliant. The family who operated the educational farm retired by 2024 and the farmhouse was subsequently demolished due to noncompliance with ADA.
