= Lincolnshire-Riverwoods Fire Protection District =

The Lincolnshire-Riverwoods Fire Protection District is a United States public safety agency purposed to defend a portion of the Vernon Township in the northeastern Illinois county of Lake from fire. The firefighting district is composed of three stations; one of these stations is located in the village of Lincolnshire, while the others are in the adjacent villages of Riverwoods and Vernon Hills.

The fire protection district offers a number civilian services to the villages of Lincolnshire and Riverwoods, including surveys identifying how competent houses would be to fire and surveys to check the functionality of residents' fire detectors. They also offer CPR classes.

There are 36 sworn full-time Firefighter/Paramedics, five civilian workers, 1 Battalion Chiefs, 1 Deputy Chiefs, and one Fire Chief.
