= Bannockburn Elementary School District 106 =

School district in Illinois, United States

Location
- 2165 Telegraph Road Bannockburn, Illinois, 60015; United States

District information
- Grades: K-8
- Superintendent: Scott Herrmann
- Schools: Bannockburn School

Other information
- Website: Official website

Bannockburn Elementary School District 106 is a K-8 school district located in the small high-income Lake County village of Bannockburn, Illinois, United States. The school district is composed of one school, known as Bannockburn Elementary School. The school, which serves grades first through eight and also kindergarten, is run by Principal Adam Mihelbergel and superintendent Dr. Scott Herrmann. Bannockburn Elementary School has fourteen academic teachers, five special education teachers, and four creative arts teachers, with one teacher educating her students in both academic and creative arts classes. The district includes portions of Bannockburn, Deerfield, Highland Park, Lincolnshire and Riverwoods.

The athletics team of the school district participates against mostly religious schools, including the Jewish school Hillel Torah and St. Gilbert School of Grayslake, which is a Catholic school.

The school board president is Matt Gopin. The other school board members are Elise Adley, David Kotowsky, Jake Leahy, Dr. Sheetal Patel, Bethany Schols, and Allison Bowman.

The district has been noted for being run in a very fiscally responsible manner. The school board voted to decrease the tax levy by 5% in 2017.

The school was attended by the children of Michael Jordan. He resided in Highland Park High School (Highland Park, Illinois), but his children attended Bannockburn. Jordan's daughter Jasmine, told Charlotte Magazine that while attending Bannockburn's public school, her life was "surprisingly normal."
