= Bannockburn, Illinois =

- Village
- Emblem
- Interactive map of Bannockburn, Illinois
- Coordinates: 42°11′40″N 87°52′32″W
- Country: United States
- State: Illinois
- Counties: Lake
- Townships: West Deerfield, Vernon

Government
  - Type: Council-manager

Area
  - Total: 2.05 sq mi (5.31 km^{2})
  - Land: 2.03 sq mi (5.25 km^{2})
  - Water: 0.023 sq mi (0.06 km^{2})
- Elevation: 692 ft (211 m)

Population (2020)
  - Total: 1,013
  - Density: 499.5/sq mi (192.85/km^{2})
- Time zone: UTC-6 (CST)
  - Summer (DST): UTC-5 (CDT)
- ZIP Code: 60015
- Area code(s): 847, 224
- FIPS code: 17-03610
- GNIS feature ID: 2398029
- Website: www.bannockburn.org

Bannockburn is a village in West Deerfield and Vernon townships in Lake County, Illinois, United States. Per the 2020 census, the population was 1,013. A northern suburb of Chicago, the village is generally considered part of the North Shore subregion of Chicagoland. It is best known as the location of the main campus of Trinity International University and its component Trinity Evangelical Divinity School, though the university often lists its address as being the larger and more recognizable neighboring suburb of Deerfield. The Friedman house by Frank Lloyd Wright is also located in Bannockburn.

== History ==
Bannockburn was founded by Scottish real estate developer William Aitken, who planned a community of "country estates" on 110 acres (0.45 km^{2}) in inland Lake County. Named for the Scottish village of Bannockburn, the village began construction in 1924 and was incorporated in 1929. Aitken designed his development for the affluent members of his bridge and country club. His plan for Bannockburn featured large lots to imitate country living, and this design has been preserved; in fact, the original 1-acre (4,000 m^{2}) minimum on home lots has been increased to two.

Gradually, Bannockburn expanded its boundaries to its current 1,318 acres (5.33 km^{2}). The Tri-State Tollway was built through the village in the 1950s, encouraging growth, though traffic noise pollution has been a persistent local concern. In the late 1960s Bannockburn's citizens, after some debate, approved the construction of the first of several business parks along the village's northern edge. It created its first commercial zone in 1984 along Illinois Route 22. Bannockburn's municipal services expanded slowly in an effort to limit taxes, but it established a police department in the 1970s and built a village hall in 1992.

== Geography ==
According to the 2021 census gazetteer files, Bannockburn has a total area of 2.05 square miles (5.31 km^{2}), of which 2.03 square miles (5.26 km^{2}) (or 98.88%) is land and 0.02 square miles (0.05 km^{2}) (or 1.12%) is water. The Tri-State Tollway forms the village's western boundary, with the village of Lincolnshire present on the other side of the highway; the city of Lake Forest borders the village to the north, and the village of Deerfield lies to the south. The lake-side communities of Highwood and Highland Park lie directly to the east, separating Bannockburn from Lake Michigan.

== Demographics ==
Historical population
Census	Pop.	Note	%±
1930	186		—
1940	179		−3.8%
1950	249		39.1%
1960	466		87.1%
1970	1,359		191.6%
1980	1,316		−3.2%
1990	1,388		5.5%
2000	1,429		3.0%
2010	1,583		10.8%
2020	1,013		−36.0%
U.S. Decennial Census; 2010 2020

=== Racial and ethnic composition ===
Bannockburn village, Illinois – Racial and ethnic composition Note: the US Census treats Hispanic/Latino as an ethnic category. This table excludes Latinos from the racial categories and assigns them to a separate category. Hispanics/Latinos may be of any race.
Race / Ethnicity (NH = Non-Hispanic)	Pop 2000	Pop 2010	Pop 2020	% 2000	% 2010	% 2020
White alone (NH)	1,229	1,185	667	86.00%	74.86%	65.84%
Black or African American alone (NH)	47	94	82	3.29%	5.94%	8.09%
Native American or Alaska Native alone (NH)	1	5	3	0.07%	0.32%	0.30%
Asian alone (NH)	72	219	168	5.04%	13.83%	16.58%
Native Hawaiian or Pacific Islander alone (NH)	1	1	0	0.07%	0.06%	0.00%
Other race alone (NH)	0	1	6	0.00%	0.06%	0.59%
Mixed race or Multiracial (NH)	29	25	42	2.03%	1.58%	4.15%
Hispanic or Latino (any race)	50	53	45	3.50%	3.35%	4.44%
Total	1,429	1,583	1,013	100.00%	100.00%	100.00%

=== 2020 census ===
As of the 2020 census, Bannockburn had a population of 1,013. The median age was 32.3 years. 29.6% of residents were under the age of 18 and 16.5% were 65 years of age or older. For every 100 females, there were 97.9 males, and for every 100 females age 18 and over, there were 90.6 males age 18 and over.

There were 303 households in the village, of which 38.6% had children under the age of 18 living with them. Of all households, 60.7% were married-couple households, 13.9% were households with a male householder and no spouse or partner present, and 22.8% were households with a female householder and no spouse or partner present. About 18.2% of all households were made up of individuals, and 6.3% had someone living alone who was 65 years of age or older.

There were 349 housing units, of which 13.2% were vacant. The homeowner vacancy rate was 2.3% and the rental vacancy rate was 4.5%. 100.0% of residents lived in urban areas, while 0.0% lived in rural areas.

=== Income and poverty ===
The median income for a household in the village was $115,833, and the median income for a family was $158,125. Males had a median income of $17,500 versus $11,172 for females. The per capita income for the village was $54,026. About 1.6% of families and 1.0% of the population were below the poverty line, including 0.0% of those under age 18 and 0.0% of those age 65 or over.

== Economy ==
Companies based in Bannockburn include Stericycle.

== Education ==
The village of Bannockburn is home to Bannockburn Elementary School District 106, a small one-facility district of approximately 200 students from Bannockburn and communities east of the Tri-State Tollway. These students attend Deerfield High School for grades 9–12. Those to the west of the highway are served by Lincolnshire-Prairie View School District 103, and Adlai E. Stevenson District 125. Part of Trinity International University's campus is located within the boundaries of Bannockburn.

== Government ==
Similar to other communities in the area, the Village of Bannockburn functions on a Board of six trustees, a village president, and a salaried full-time village manager that helps monitor and guide the administration and services for the Village of Bannockburn. The six trustees are residents of Bannockburn and are elected to staggered four-year terms. Each trustee is given the responsibility for a department of government activities. The village's president and clerk are elected to two-year terms. As a small community, Bannockburn relies on neighboring Deerfield for a number of essential services.

== Notable people ==
- Mike Ditka, player and coach with the Chicago Bears, previous resident
- Kirk Hinrich, basketball player with various teams; previous resident
- Phil Jackson, coach of the Chicago Bulls and Los Angeles Lakers; previous resident
- Joakim Noah, center for the Memphis Grizzlies, Chicago Bulls; previous resident
- Ron Santo, third baseman for the Chicago Cubs; previous resident
- Orlando Pace, offensive lineman with the Chicago Bears and St. Louis Rams; previous resident
- Chance the Rapper, Chicago rapper; current resident
