= Hal Gordon (hot dog vendor) =

American hot dog vendor

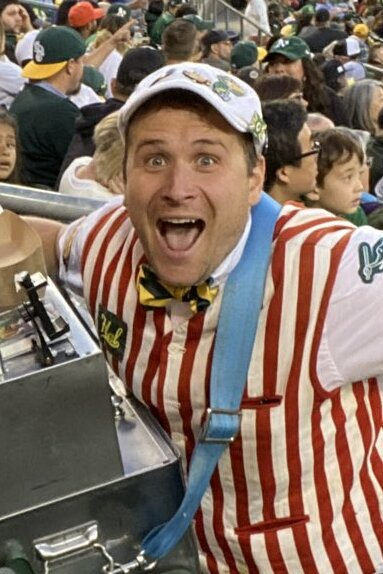
- Gordon in 2022
- Born: August 24, 1987 (age 39); Riverwoods, Illinois
- Other name: Hal the Hot Dog Guy
- Education: University of Chicago (BA); Georgetown University (MPP); University of California, Berkeley (MS, PhD)
- Occupations: Hot dog vendor, economist
- Years active: 2005–2022 (hot dog vending)

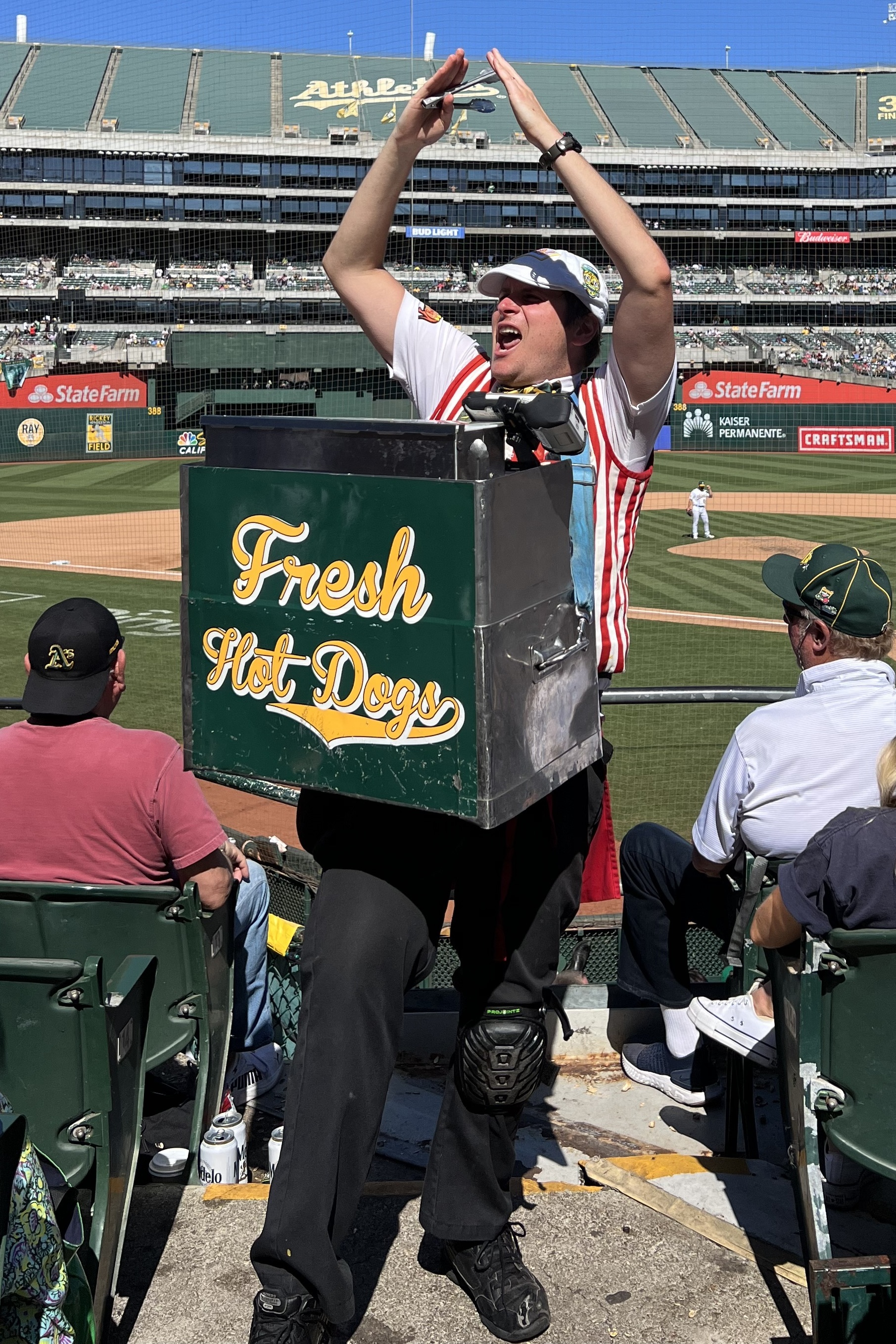
Gordon was known for leading chants such as: "Gimme an A! What's that spell? A's!"

Hal Giuliani Gordon (born August 24, 1987) is an American economist and former hot‑dog vendor. He is best known for selling hot dogs at Oakland Athletics games from 2015 to 2022, during which time he became known as an unofficial mascot for the team.

== Career ==
Gordon was born and raised in Riverwoods, Illinois, in the Chicago metropolitan area. His first jobs were selling hot dogs during Chicago Cubs and Chicago White Sox games at Wrigley Field and U.S. Cellular Field, which he began in the summer of 2005 between high school and college. As he moved from city to city, Gordon took on vending jobs in Chicago (selling during Cubs, White Sox and Blackhawks games), Washington, D.C. (at Nationals games) and, from 2015, the Bay Area with the San Francisco Giants, Oakland Athletics and Oakland Raiders (before their relocation to Las Vegas).

While he worked at Oakland Athletics games, Gordon became known as an unofficial mascot for the team, leading fans in cheers while selling hot dogs in his signature red-and-white striped vest, for which he has received mentions on Athletics broadcasts and coverage in local news media. Gordon credited late Oakland A's vendor James Graff for inspiring him to adopt a retro vending aesthetic and focus on entertainment and cheerleading. Gordon was known for having his own baseball cards and merchandise. For the 2020 Major League Baseball season, during which fans (and vendors) were not present at games due to the COVID-19 pandemic, Gordon was represented by a cardboard cutout at the Oakland Coliseum and ran an online campaign to raise money for out-of-work vendors. Writing in an op-ed, Gordon voiced his support for the proposed Howard Terminal Ballpark.

Gordon did not return to vend for the 2023 season, instead choosing to focus on his academic career. Gordon is a public critic of the planned Oakland Athletics relocation to Las Vegas. Gordon has argued that Athletics owner John Fisher "murdered baseball" in Oakland and has characterized the franchise as "[viewing] their fans as another one of their enemies." Gordon was involved in organizing the "Reverse Boycott" protest against the Athletics' proposed relocation.

== Personal life ==
Gordon earned a PhD in Agricultural and Resource Economics at the University of California, Berkeley in December 2022. Despite working as a hot‑dog vendor, Gordon is a vegetarian.
