= Lincolnshire, Illinois =

- Village
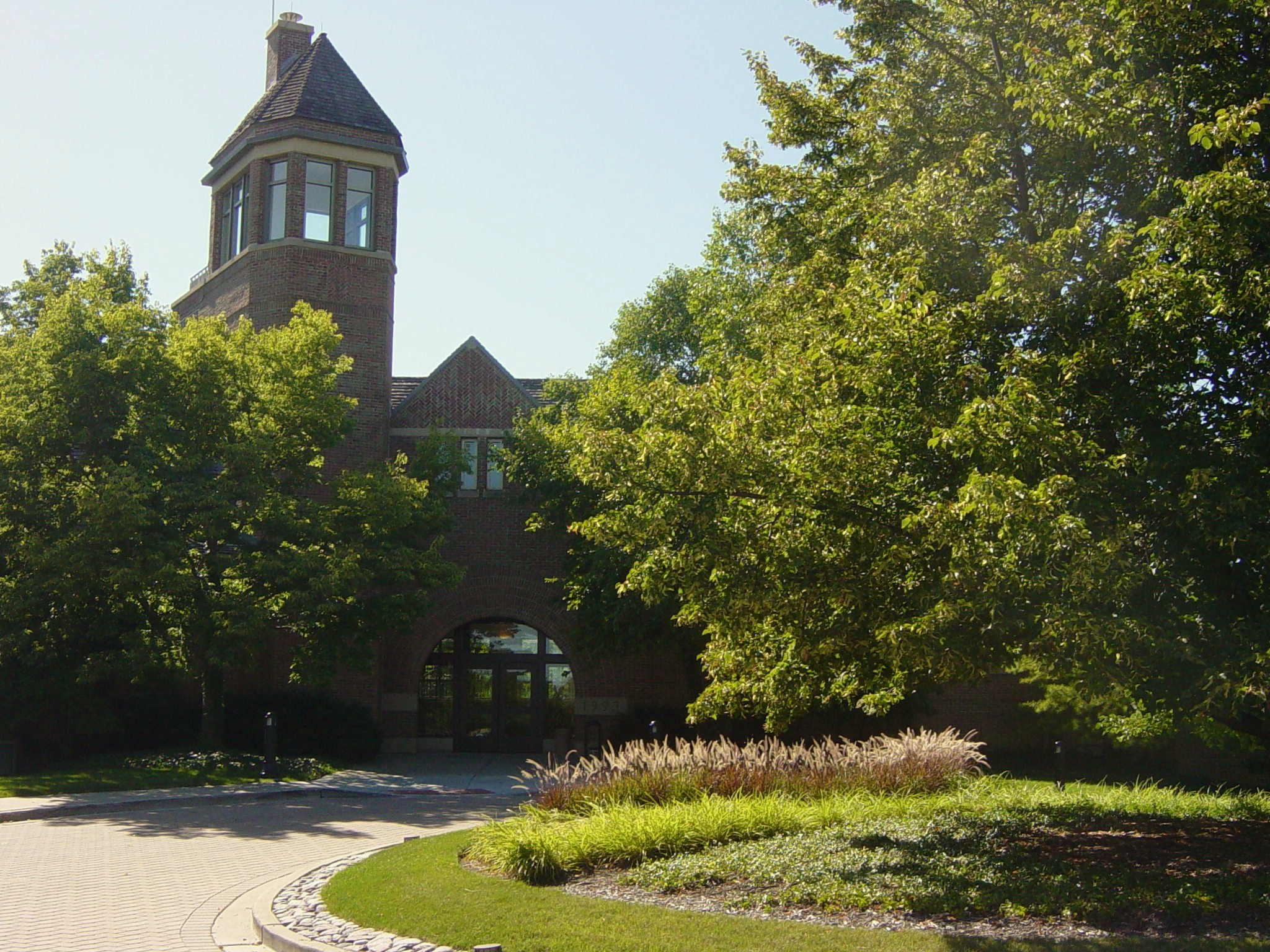
- Lincolnshire Village Hall

- Icon

- Location of Lincolnshire in Lake County, Illinois.

- Location within Chicago metropolitan area Location within Illinois Location within the United States
- Coordinates: 42°11′45″N 87°55′06″W
- Country: United States
- State: Illinois
- County: Lake
- Townships: Vernon, West Deerfield
- Founded: 1957

Government
  - Type: Council-Manager form, Home rule municipality

Area
  - Total: 4.70 sq mi (12.16 km^{2})
  - Land: 4.56 sq mi (11.80 km^{2})
  - Water: 0.14 sq mi (0.36 km^{2})
- Elevation: 646 ft (197 m)

Population (2020)
  - Total: 7,940
  - Density: 1,742.2/sq mi (672.68/km^{2})
- Time zone: UTC-6 (CST)
  - Summer (DST): UTC-5 (CDT)
- ZIP code: 60069
- Area codes: 847 & 224
- FIPS code: 17-43666
- GNIS feature ID: 2398442
- Website: www.lincolnshireil.gov

Lincolnshire is a village in Lake County, Illinois, United States. It is a northern suburb of Chicago. Per the 2020 census, the population was 7,940. Named after Lincolnshire, England, the village was incorporated on August 5, 1957, from the unincorporated Half Day area when land was purchased to build a residential subdivision. The community underwent an aggressive era of expansion from 1983 through the 1990s. The Des Plaines River bisects the village, passing from north to south; Illinois Route 22 also divides the village into two parts, crossing the village from east to west.

Camping World, Quill Corporation, Sysmex America and Zebra Technologies are headquartered in Lincolnshire. The village is home to the public Adlai E. Stevenson High School as part of Lincolnshire-Prairie View School District 103. It is also home to Lincolnshire Commons, an upscale lifestyle center. The village maintains a police department and public works system; it retrieves water from the city of Highland Park, which derives its water from adjacent Lake Michigan. The village has a council–manager government and is a home-rule municipality. The mayor of Lincolnshire is Elizabeth Brandt as of 2024.

== History ==
=== Prior to incorporation ===
The first inhabitants of what would become the village of Lincolnshire were Native American Potawatomi migrants from Canada and Wisconsin. The tribesmen left these northern places in the 16th century in search of a warmer, more temperate climate. The first Europeans to visit the area were the French Jesuit explorers Father Jacques Marquette and Louis Jolliet. Shortly after arriving in 1673 at the site of what later became Waukegan, they sailed down the Des Plaines River and made contact with the local Potawatomi, who would dominate the area by 1768. One of the Potawatomi villages that they encountered stretched along the west bank of the Des Plaines River, from what later became Illinois Route 22 south to Aptakisic Road, the first real settlement in the Lincolnshire and Half Day region.

The Lincolnshire area was originally a part of the town of Half Day, the first region settled by non-Native American peoples in Lake County. The first white settler in the Lincolnshire area was Captain Daniel Wright, who arrived in 1834. Chief Halfda allowed Wright to build his cabin at the south end of the Potawatomi village at the site of the intersection of present-day Milwaukee Avenue and Aptakisic Road. The Potawatomi tribesmen were ousted and faced relocation through the 1833 Treaty of Chicago, which was ratified in 1835 and thereafter implemented.

The Half Day area experienced an economic boom with the arrival of new settlers during the two decades after Wright's arrival. Among these pioneers were Seth Washburn, the first postmaster of the Vernon Township, who settled at the site of what later became the Lincolnshire-Prairie View School District 103's Half Day Intermediate School, and Laura Sprague, the first teacher to reside in the area. By 1855, 21 years after the settling of the Half Day area by Wright, the town was a thriving community with a blacksmith's shop, sawmill, country store, and a church. At this time, the Chicago and Milwaukee Railway connected Milwaukee to the county seat of Waukegan, and it expanded throughout the Lake County area over the next few decades; this also contributed to the town's prosperity. Henry Ford's invention of the automobile in the early 20th century made Half Day a more accessible destination to other communities within the Chicago metropolitan area, and the village became a popular recreation area. This prompted the opening of many businesses, including an amusement park, a race track, a bowling alley, a dance hall, and taverns, that catered to visitors.

=== Incorporation and growth ===
Vernon Township, which encompassed the village of Half Day, was carved up between wealthy farmers after the end of World War I. Edward Ryerson, Adlai Stevenson II, Samuel Insull, and Louis Leverone bought the majority of the territory within Vernon Township's borders. Leverone, who had purchased the Half Day area, sold a tract of land to developer Roger Ladd and his eponymous company in 1955. The company organized a residential subdivision out of the ceded town of Half Day and christened it "Lincolnshire", the precursor to the present-day village of the same name. However, life in the village was problematic, as the new subdivision was served by dirt roads and had neither a sufficient communal sanitation system nor a gas line. Lincolnshire's police coverage was inefficient, as officers patrolling the area had to be dispatched from Waukegan, approximately 16 miles (26 km) to the north. As a result, the Cambridge Forest Association (CFA) was formed to lobby for improvement in the livelihoods of the people of Lincolnshire. With sponsorship from the Cambridge Forest Association, Lincolnshire was incorporated as a village on August 5, 1957. The CFA was later renamed the Lincolnshire Community Association.

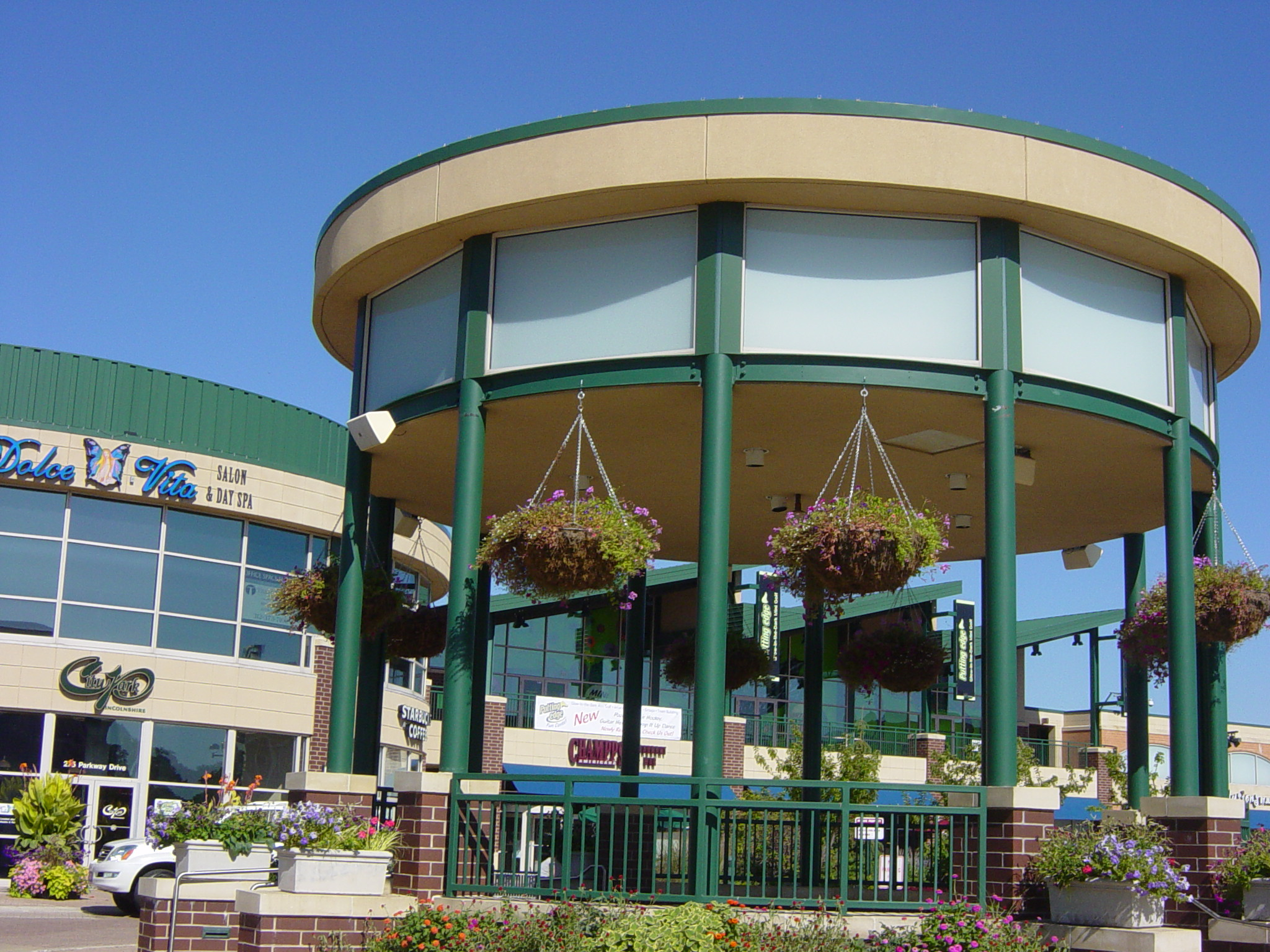
The commercial City Park complex. The Rotunda is in the foreground.

Lincolnshire's government initially adhered to a conservative and cautious approach, and refused to annex two corporate park divisions in the 1980s. Opponents to the village government's methods, however, won out in later years; supporting a quick growth to rival the increasing affluence of surrounding villages, they oversaw the Marriott Lincolnshire Resort and Lincolnshire Corporate Center over a period of years following 1983. Lincolnshire also sought to annex the old remnants of the unincorporated community of Half Day from which it was created, but lost in a court battle with the village of Vernon Hills in 1994; the court case set the present-day border between the two villages, which lies along Route 22 up to its intersection with Milwaukee Avenue. To consolidate these new acquisitions, Lincolnshire set to work on a new village hall that was completed in 1993, and constructed a downtown area centered on the intersection of Aptakisic Road and Milwaukee Avenue; the village's endeavors included commercial regions like the Lincolnshire Corporate Center, City Park, and the Lincolnshire Commons. These facilities were planned and constructed from the mid-1990s to the mid-2000s.

In 2005, Buffalo Grove and Lincolnshire reached a boundary agreement with respect to the allocation of properties surrounding and concerning the unincorporated Prairie View area, which lay in between the two Lake County villages. The acreage in question was divided equally between the two villages.

== Geography ==
Lincolnshire shares a border with the villages of Vernon Hills to the northwest, Buffalo Grove to the southwest, Bannockburn to the east, and Riverwoods to the southeast. The city of Lake Forest is located to the northeast of the village, while the unincorporated community of Prairie View borders the village directly to the west.

According to the 2021 census gazetteer files, Lincolnshire has a total area of 4.70 square miles (12.17 km^{2}), of which 4.56 square miles (11.81 km^{2}) (or 97.04%) is land and 0.14 square miles (0.36 km^{2}) (or 2.96%) is water.

The village of Lincolnshire is a suburb of the city of Chicago in the southern reaches of Lake County; like Chicago, Lincolnshire is located in the extreme northeastern region of the state of Illinois. The Des Plaines River meanders through the village, dividing the town in half vertically at the village hall, while Half Day Road (Illinois Route 22) splits the village in half in an east–west direction. Milwaukee Avenue (U.S. Route 45) runs in a north–south direction through Lincolnshire, into the village of Buffalo Grove to the south and Vernon Hills to the north.

Lincolnshire has been a Tree City USA every year since 1988. To maintain Lincolnshire's foliage, the village passed the "Tree Preservation Ordinance", a law that places tight restrictions on tree removal.

Lincolnshire lies on the border of two Chicago-area watersheds: one pertaining to the Des Plaines River, and the other involving the nearby north fork of the Chicago River. This situation directly relates to the presence of the Des Plaines River in the village.

=== Climate ===
Due to its proximity to the city, Lincolnshire's climate shares many of the same traits as Chicago. Lincolnshire lies in a humid continental climate zone and experiences four discernible seasons. Lincolnshire receives an average of 36.28 inches (922 mm) of precipitation each year.

Climate data for Lincolnshire, IL
Month	Jan	Feb	Mar	Apr	May	Jun	Jul	Aug	Sep	Oct	Nov	Dec	Year
Mean daily maximum °F (°C)	30 (−1)	35 (2)	45 (7)	56 (13)	67 (19)	78 (26)	83 (28)	81 (27)	75 (24)	63 (17)	49 (9)	36 (2)	58 (14)
Mean daily minimum °F (°C)	14 (−10)	18 (−8)	28 (−2)	37 (3)	47 (8)	56 (13)	63 (17)	62 (17)	54 (12)	42 (6)	32 (0)	20 (−7)	39 (4)
Average precipitation inches (mm)	1.89 (48)	1.56 (40)	2.50 (64)	3.70 (94)	3.59 (91)	3.86 (98)	3.50 (89)	4.84 (123)	3.24 (82)	2.70 (69)	3.22 (82)	2.20 (56)	36.8 (936)
Source: The Weather Channel

== Demographics ==
Historical population
Census	Pop.	Note	%±
1960	555		—
1970	2,531		356.0%
1980	4,151		64.0%
1990	4,931		18.8%
2000	6,108		23.9%
2010	7,275		19.1%
2020	7,940		9.1%
U.S. Decennial Census; 2010 2020

=== Racial and ethnic composition ===
Lincolnshire village, Illinois – Racial and ethnic composition Note: the US Census treats Hispanic/Latino as an ethnic category. This table excludes Latinos from the racial categories and assigns them to a separate category. Hispanics/Latinos may be of any race.
Race / Ethnicity (NH = Non-Hispanic)	Pop 2000	Pop 2010	Pop 2020	% 2000	% 2010	% 2020
White alone (NH)	5,630	6,534	5,815	92.17%	89.81%	73.24%
Black or African American alone (NH)	31	60	83	0.51%	0.82%	1.05%
Native American or Alaska Native alone (NH)	2	1	4	0.03%	0.01%	0.05%
Asian alone (NH)	227	442	1,457	3.72%	6.08%	18.35%
Native Hawaiian or Pacific Islander alone (NH)	4	0	2	0.07%	0.00%	0.03%
Other race alone (NH)	8	9	12	0.13%	0.12%	0.15%
Mixed race or Multiracial (NH)	53	80	259	0.87%	1.10%	3.26%
Hispanic or Latino (any race)	153	149	308	2.50%	2.05%	3.88%
Total	6,108	7,275	7,940	100.00%	100.00%	100.00%

=== 2020 census ===
As of the 2020 census, Lincolnshire had a population of 7,940. The population density was 1,690.80 inhabitants per square mile (652.82/km^{2}), and there were 3,414 housing units at an average density of 727.00 per square mile (280.70/km^{2}).

The median age was 50.2 years. 20.7% of residents were under the age of 18 and 29.4% were 65 years of age or older. For every 100 females, there were 89.2 males, and for every 100 females age 18 and over there were 84.4 males age 18 and over.

There were 3,114 households in the village, including 2,056 families. Of all households, 29.7% had children under the age of 18, 61.4% were married-couple households, 10.4% had a male householder with no spouse or partner present, and 25.4% had a female householder with no spouse or partner present. About 29.0% of all households were made up of individuals, and 20.8% had someone living alone who was 65 years of age or older.

100.0% of residents lived in urban areas and 0.0% lived in rural areas.

There were 3,414 housing units, of which 8.8% were vacant. The homeowner vacancy rate was 1.5% and the rental vacancy rate was 14.8%.

=== Income and poverty ===
The median income for a household in the village was $130,076, and the median income for a family was $191,173. Males had a median income of $121,339 versus $66,850 for females. The per capita income for the village was $82,088. About 1.2% of families and 4.2% of the population were below the poverty line, including 1.2% of those under age 18 and 7.2% of those age 65 or over.

=== 2010 census ===
As of the census of 2010, there were 7,275 people living in the village. The racial makeup of the village was 91.5% White, 0.9% African American, 0.01% Native American, 6.1% Asian, 0.3% from other races, and 1.2% from two or more races. Hispanic or Latino residents of any race were 2% of the population.

=== 2000 census ===
As of the census of 2000, there were 6,108 people, 2,134 households, and 1,796 families living in the village. The population density was 1,386.2 inhabitants per square mile (535.2/km^{2}). There were 2,177 housing units at an average density of 494.1 per square mile (190.8/km^{2}). The racial makeup of the village was 94.1% White, 0.5% African American, 0.1% Native American, 3.7% Asian, 0.1% Pacific Islander, 0.5% from other races, and 1.1% from two or more races. Hispanic or Latino of any race were 2.5% of the population.

== Culture and media ==
The village of Lincolnshire holds an annual summer festival, mirroring the more publicized and much larger Taste of Chicago in both nomenclature and intention. The Taste of Lincolnshire features and advertises "taste-size" samples of local restaurants and provides local entertainment, including musicians, a raffle, and a local pet show. Since 1993, Lincolnshire has also held the Lincolnshire Art Festival a few weeks prior to the Taste of Lincolnshire; the event encourages Lake County artists to display their work to the community. As incentives for publicity, entertainment and parking are provided free of charge. Lincolnshire hosts a Fourth of July celebration annually known as "Red, White, and BOOM!", a collection of activities centered on the celebration of the American Independence Day. It incorporates live music, a raffle, and a fireworks show at local Spring Lake Park into its festivities.

Lincolnshire was also home to two motion picture performers: Alison La Placa, an actress famous for her role as snobbish yuppie Linda Phillips on the sitcom Duet and its spin-off Open House, is an alumnus of Stevenson High School; and Kyle Brandt, another graduate of Stevenson, who played Philip Kiriakis on the soap opera Days of Our Lives and appears as himself on the reality show The Real World: Chicago.

== Sports and recreation ==
Lincolnshire, despite its relatively small size, is home to nine local public parks. Spring Lake Park, which is centered on an eponymous lake and sports a small beachhead, hosts Lincolnshire's festivities during the Fourth of July. North Park, a major sporting field and nature reserve in northeastern Lincolnshire, collaborates with Lincolnshire-Prairie View School District 103 to meet both the growing need for youth sports teams and extra recreational public park space; School District 103 also collaborated with the village of Lincolnshire to create an educational nature center called Rivershire Park, which is located in southeastern Lincolnshire. The nature center runs programs to educate district students and other visitors about the local ecology, alongside the natural fauna and flora of the Lake County area, and Memorial Park is a rest stop for pedestrians and cyclists traversing eastern Lincolnshire; Florsheim Nature Preserve, which sports an unusually high Floristic Quality Index rating, is shelter to endangered and threatened species of flora rarely found elsewhere in the county. Whytegate Park, an athletic complex overshadowed by nearby North Park, sports several sports courts and a fitness course, and Balzer Park is home to a short hiking trail and sports facilities. Lincolnshire's other two parks, Bicentennial Park and Olde Mill Park, are little more than playgrounds for local children.

The Lincolnshire Marriott Resort takes up a large area of land to the west of the Des Plaines River, and has an eighteen-hole golf course that hugs Illinois Route 22 to the south; the golf course is not only available to guests, but also offers lessons to local residents. The resort is also home to the Marriott Theatre, which garnered a reputation through the acceptance of 370 Joseph Jefferson Award nominations presented throughout its history.

Four notable sportsmen have lived within the borders of the village of Lincolnshire. Andrea Jaeger, a professional tennis player known for her successful, albeit brief, career in tennis that saw progress in Wimbledon and the French Open, graduated from Adlai E. Stevenson High School; Matt O'Dwyer, a former NFL football player who played for numerous teams ranging from the New York Jets to the Green Bay Packers, was born in Lincolnshire. Robert Berland, an Olympic who won medals at the 1984 Summer Olympics in Los Angeles and the 1988 Summer Olympics in Seoul, lives in the village. New York Knicks basketball player Jalen Brunson moved to Lincolnshire in 2010 to attend Stevenson High School.

In October 2013, the Stanley Cup made its first ever-appearance in Lincolnshire and again visited the village in July 2015.

== Government ==
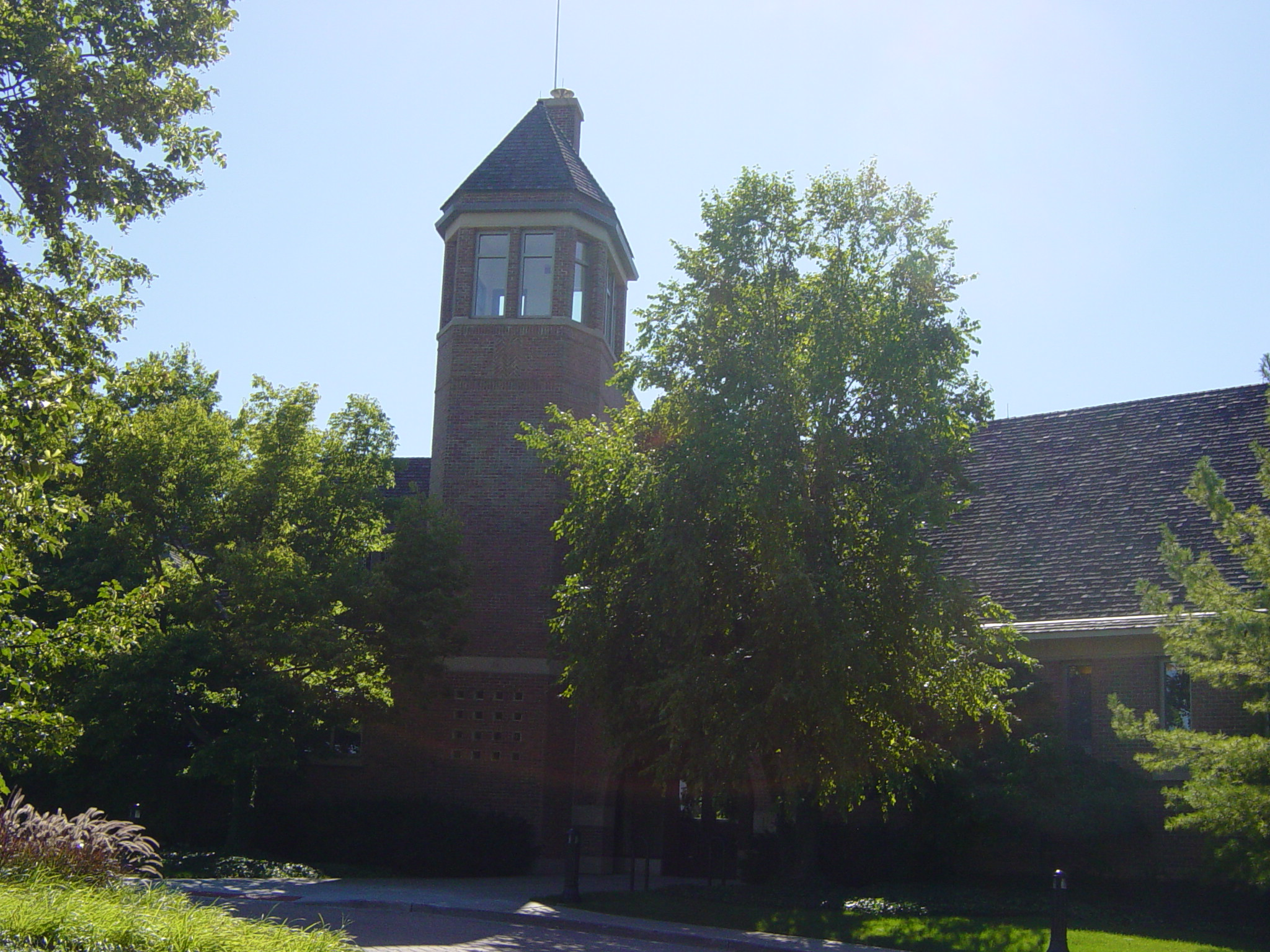
The village hall, where the government of Lincolnshire meets regularly

The government of Lincolnshire is constituted as a council-manager form government with elements of home rule, which it adopted via ordinance in 1976. The village is headed by a mayor who presides over a board of six trustees at every meeting, although the daily functions of the village are carried out by a professional salaried village manager. Once elected, the mayor serves a four-year term; the elected trustees serve four-year terms that are staggered. It is the responsibility of the mayor to appoint a village manager, although the manager cannot take office until the board has approved the mayor's choice.

Government meetings are generally conducted on the second and fourth Mondays of the month. In the case of a tie, the mayor has the casting vote. Mayors of Lincolnshire can veto propositions set forth by the board of trustees, although this move may be overridden by a two-thirds opposition vote from the board.

As of 2008, the village office holders were:

Name	Profession	Term notes
Elizabeth J. Brandt	Village Mayor	Expires 2027 (reelected)
Joe Kelly	Village Trustee	Expires 2027
Robert Mitchell	Village Trustee	Expires 2025
Veronica Pantelis	Village Trustee	Expires 2027 (reelected)
Dr. Mara Grujanac	Village Trustee	Expires 2027 (reelected)
Dr. Sandra Wright	Village Trustee	Expires 2025
Jill Raizin	Village Trustee	Expires 2025 (reelected)
Barbara Mastandrea	Village Clerk	Expires 2027 (reelected)

=== Safety ===
Lincolnshire is served by its own police department, which is based in the village hall. This police force is staffed by 27 full-time members; 24 of them are sworn police officers, and the other is a community service officer. The Lincolnshire Police Department runs an emergency center that accepts 911 calls in the region.

The Lincolnshire Police Department collaborates with Lincolnshire-Prairie View School District 103's junior high school, Daniel Wright, to form a chapter of the Drug Abuse Resistance Education program. This program has graduated sixth graders from the school every year since 1991.

The village is served by the Lincolnshire-Riverwoods Fire Protection District, which employs 36 sworn full-time firefighter/paramedics. The Fire Protection District has three fire stations: one located in central Lincolnshire, slightly to the west of the village hall, one to the south in Riverwoods, and a third located on the north end of the district in Vernon Hills. The Fire Protection District runs free services and programs, including fire safety surveys of houses in the area.

Lincolnshire lies in a floodplain region, a consequence of the presence of the Des Plaines River and the proximity a fork of the Chicago River on the far east border. A third factor involves small Indian Creek, which runs north of Lincolnshire. The village participates in the National Flood Insurance Program, a Federal Emergency Management Agency (FEMA) project, to alleviate a portion of the costs of flood damage that may overtax affected village residents. The village also implements the Community Rating System, a disaster readiness plan.

== Education ==
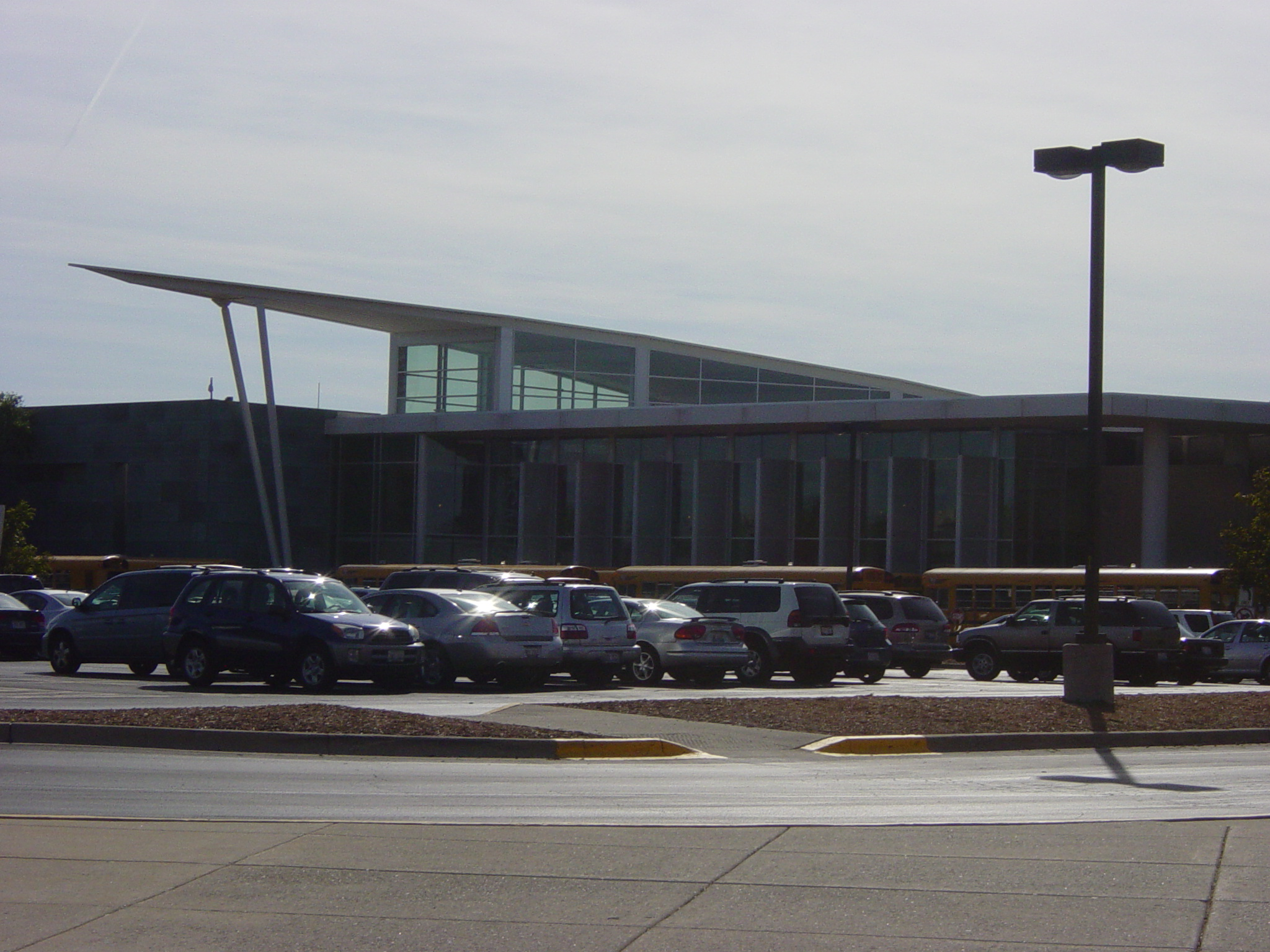
Adlai E. Stevenson High School

Lincolnshire has two school districts: Lincolnshire-Prairie View School District 103 and Adlai E. Stevenson High School District 125, although a few students living in the village also attend school in Aptakisic-Tripp Community Consolidated School District 102 in neighboring Buffalo Grove. District 103, which feeds into District 125, is home to three schools: Laura B. Sprague Elementary School (K-2), Half Day Intermediate School (3–5), and Daniel Wright Junior High School (6–8); District 125 comprises only Adlai E. Stevenson High School. Both are public school districts, funded by the government. Aside from districts 102, 103, and 125, a very small portion of Lincolnshire, located in West Deerfield Township, is served by Bannockburn School in Bannockburn, Illinois, and ultimately Deerfield High School, also in its respective village.

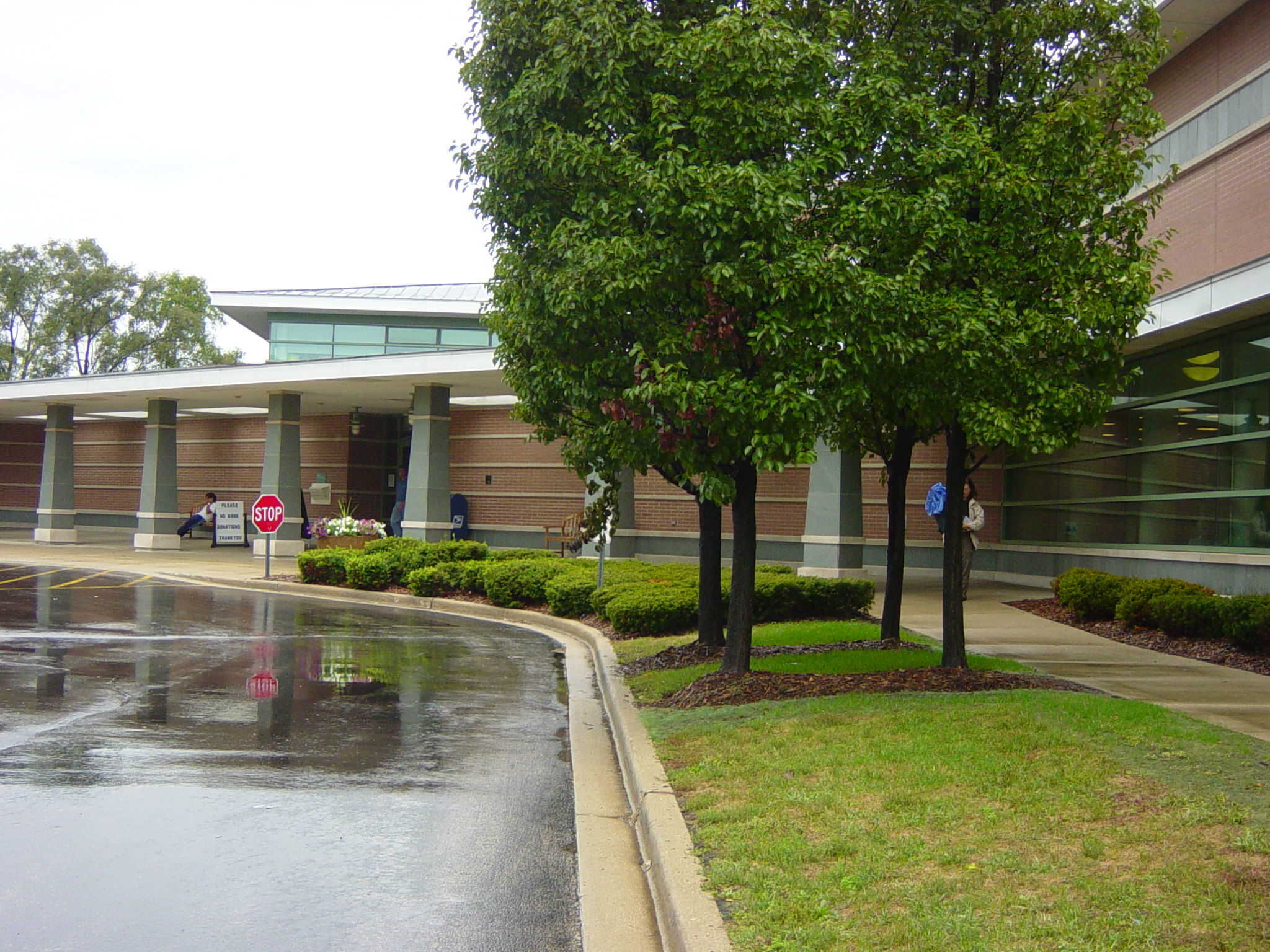
The Vernon Area Library, located within Lincolnshire

The first school to be built in what is now Lincolnshire was Half Day Intermediate School, which initially served all grades for the small town; it was originally a one-room schoolhouse before a major expansion project was undertaken to accommodate the district's increasing population. Numerous changes were made to Half Day School between 1958 and 1965, but it remained too small to receive all prospective students; in 1983, Half Day School was closed, its duties were given to Laura B. Sprague Elementary School and Daniel Wright Junior High School. It was, however, reopened nine years later as Daniel Wright and Laura Sprague began to fill to capacity. Another expansion was added to Laura Sprague and h\Half Day in 2017 to accommodate the increase in students. Grade 6 was also moved to Half Day from Daniel Wright in 2017.

Lincolnshire is also served by a number of non-government-funded educational institutions. DeVry University's Keller School of Management operates a branch in Lincolnshire, alongside the Southlakes Campus of the College of Lake County, which is located just to the north in the village of Vernon Hills. Alumni of Stevenson High School who wish to apply for the University of Illinois may do so at an extension site located in Grayslake, a village in northern Lake County. The Lincolnshire Community Nursery School, which was founded in 1973, accepts preschoolers who live in the eastern reaches of the village of Lincolnshire.

The village is home to the Vernon Area Public Library, whose district serves a large region of the Vernon Township (specifically, the villages of Lincolnshire; Buffalo Grove; and Long Grove, and portions of the village Vernon Hills). The library district also hosts a number of special events, including book talks and informational presentations.

== Infrastructure ==
=== Transportation ===
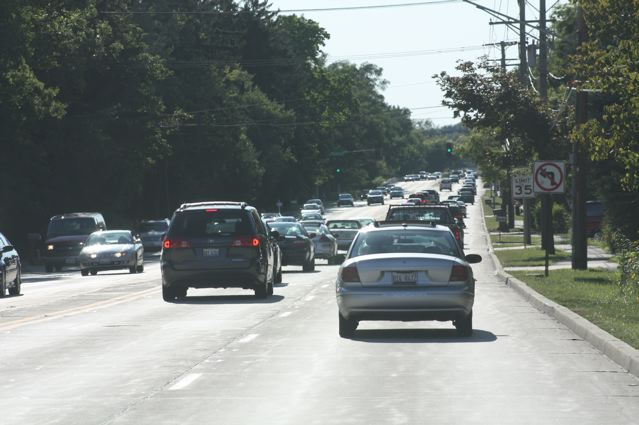
Illinois Route 22 within Lincolnshire borders

Lincolnshire lies on three arterial roads: Illinois Route 22, which is known as Half Day Road in this area; Milwaukee Avenue, which appears as Illinois Route 21/U.S. Route 45; and Aptakisic Road, which meets Milwaukee in the southern region of Lincolnshire. Lincolnshire shares its eastern border with the village of Bannockburn at Interstate 94 (where it is a portion of the Tri-State Tollway). Route 22 crosses the Des Plaines River before bridging Bannockburn and Lincolnshire by arching over Interstate Highway 94.

Lincolnshire has two primary bike paths that cover a large expanse of the village. One runs in a north–south direction alongside Riverwoods Road in the eastern half of the village, while the other runs in an east–west direction from the eastern half of the village, across the Des Plaines River, and to the village hall in the west side of the village. Smaller bike paths connect individual neighborhood areas within and around Lincolnshire.

O'Hare International Airport is 18 miles (29 km) southwest of the village of Lincolnshire. Travel between Lincolnshire and the airport is facilitated by the Tri-State Tollway, although travel by railway is also possible via the Prairie View station just west of Lincolnshire.

Pace provides bus service on multiple routes connecting Lincolnshire to Vernon Hills, Niles, and other destinations.

=== Utilities ===
The Village of Lincolnshire negotiated and signed an agreement with the City of Highland Park in 1982 to create a more efficient means of obtaining water by purchasing filtered water from Lake Michigan. The Village of Lincolnshire also monitors the public pumps and water meters of private residents. Lincolnshire is served by a sanitary sewer that connects to the Lake County Sewage Treatment Plant, which lies on the Des Plaines River outside the Village limits; the disposal of wastewater is left to the government of Lake County rather than the Village of Lincolnshire itself. Lincolnshire also runs a network of storm drains that run directly into the Des Plaines River; to protect the river's cleanliness, the village government has outlawed dumping of most chemicals into the network of storm drains. A plan to repair city streets was also implemented in 1982, and continues; the Village also offers public services to clear the streets during the fall and winter from fallen leaves and snow respectively, although on its arterial roads (Illinois Routes 22, 45, and Aptakisic Road) residents are provided with bags to clear their curbs during autumn months as it is not possible for the Village to safely clear these roads of leaf debris. The Village of Lincolnshire regularly sweeps other streets within its borders.

The Village of Lincolnshire is served by LRS for waste disposal

The engineering division of Lincolnshire's Public Works Department maintains roads and streets under the jurisdiction of Lincolnshire, inspects existing facilities, improves existing residential subdivisions, and considers the construction of new ones. The department also manages plans in case of river floods.
