= Lincolnshire Commons =

Shopping center in Lincolnshire, Illinois, US

Coordinates: 42.182381°N 87.927622°W

The Lincolnshire Commons is an upscale lifestyle center located in Lincolnshire, Illinois. The center opened in 2006 and hosts numerous high-end restaurants, and promeninent retailers such as Cheesecake Factory, Jos. A. Bank, DSW and LensCrafters. The 133,000-square-foot (12,400 m^{2}) center is a popular shopping area in Chicago's affluent north suburbs. Regal Cinemas across the street opened November 20, 1998, as City Park 20 by Regal Entertainment. It has stadium seating and an IMAX theater. This theater is known for showing independent films.
