= Half Day, Illinois =

Former unincorporated town in Lake County, Illinois

Half Day is a former unincorporated town in Lake County, Illinois, in the state's northeastern region. It is about 30 miles (48 km) north of downtown Chicago via Milwaukee Avenue.

The town was forcibly annexed by the village of Vernon Hills in 1993. The following month, the village of Lincolnshire also attempted to annex a portion of Half Day. The two villages entered a legal battle, filing lawsuits against each other. Eventually, this resulted in the Vernon Hills annexation being approved and Lincolnshire's being denied.

Parts of area infrastructure are still named for the original unincorporated community. The portion of Illinois Route 22 that passes through is named Half Day Road. Half Day School, originally established in 1839 and temporarily closed in the early 1980s after declining enrollment, was modernized and reopened in 1992; it currently serves third-, fourth-, and fifth-grade students and is part of Lincolnshire-Prairie View School District 103.

Half Day appeared in a news article in 1952 when then Illinois Governor Adlai Stevenson flew there to vote in the presidential election (Stevenson was a candidate the same year).

== Etymology ==
Half Day was named for Aptakisic, a local Potawatomi chief who allied himself with White settlers during the Black Hawk War. The chief's name meant "sun at the meridian" or "half day". Despite his alliance, the United States government removed Aptakisic and his people to the vicinity of Elmont, Kansas after the 1833 Treaty of Chicago. After this, settlers applied his name first to an inn, then to the unincorporated town.

While Aptakisic was the source of Half Day's name, local legends arose offering folk etymologies for the town. One still repeated today is that when the settlement was named, it was a half-day's distance from Chicago by horse and carriage. Another, which circulated in the early twentieth century, stated that a chief named "Hefda," transcribed by a cartographer as "Half Day", was the source. The third unsubstantiated story claims that during the removal of the Potawatomi peoples under the 1833 Treaty of Chicago, a group living in the area managed to defend the land for half of a day, but were eventually captured and dispelled. All three stories are false.
