= Great Lakes Dragaway =

American drag racing venue

Coordinates: 42°39′45″N 88°01′57″W

Great Lakes Dragway is a quarter mile dragstrip in the Town of Paris, Kenosha County, near Union Grove, Wisconsin.

== History ==
The drag strip opened in 1955, and celebrated its 50th anniversary in 2005. The drag strip became the 2nd oldest continuously operating dragstrip in the country after Inyokern Airport closed. #1 is Redding raceway in California and opened in 53. The track also is open for more dates than any other track in the United States. In March 2011, Great Lakes Dragaway won a poll "What is the most historically significant dragstrip in the United States?" on BangShift, a popular drag racing blog.

In the early days of the track, races were started by a flagman (before dragstrip Christmas Trees) and cars sometimes raced four abreast. In the 1970s, hydrogen peroxide "rocket dragster" exhibition cars ran down the track in the low 4 second elapsed time range at over 330 miles per hour. One of the cars was called "The Pollution Packer".

The track opted to no longer be a member track of the National Hot Rod Association, instead, along with several other dragstrips that year, joining the International Hot Rod Association.

== Schedule ==
The track hosts fun racing, where the general public can race their own car or motorcycle on the drag strip. The track also has monthly special events such as Real Street Drags, where the scoreboards are disabled, and flag or flashlight starts, instead of the "christmas tree" are available; an International Hot Rod Association Summit Summer Series bracket racing event; Import Wars, an event tailored towards imported (Non-US) cars, and multi-day racing shows over Memorial Day & Labor Day weekends.

The track has held snowmobile drags in winter months. Motorcycle Daredevil and World Record Motorcycle Jumper "Super" Ken Mackow got his start at this track in 1970. He went on to become a World Class Daredevil. He is listed in the Motorcycle Hall of Fame.
