= Des Plaines River =

River in Wisconsin and Illinois, U.S.

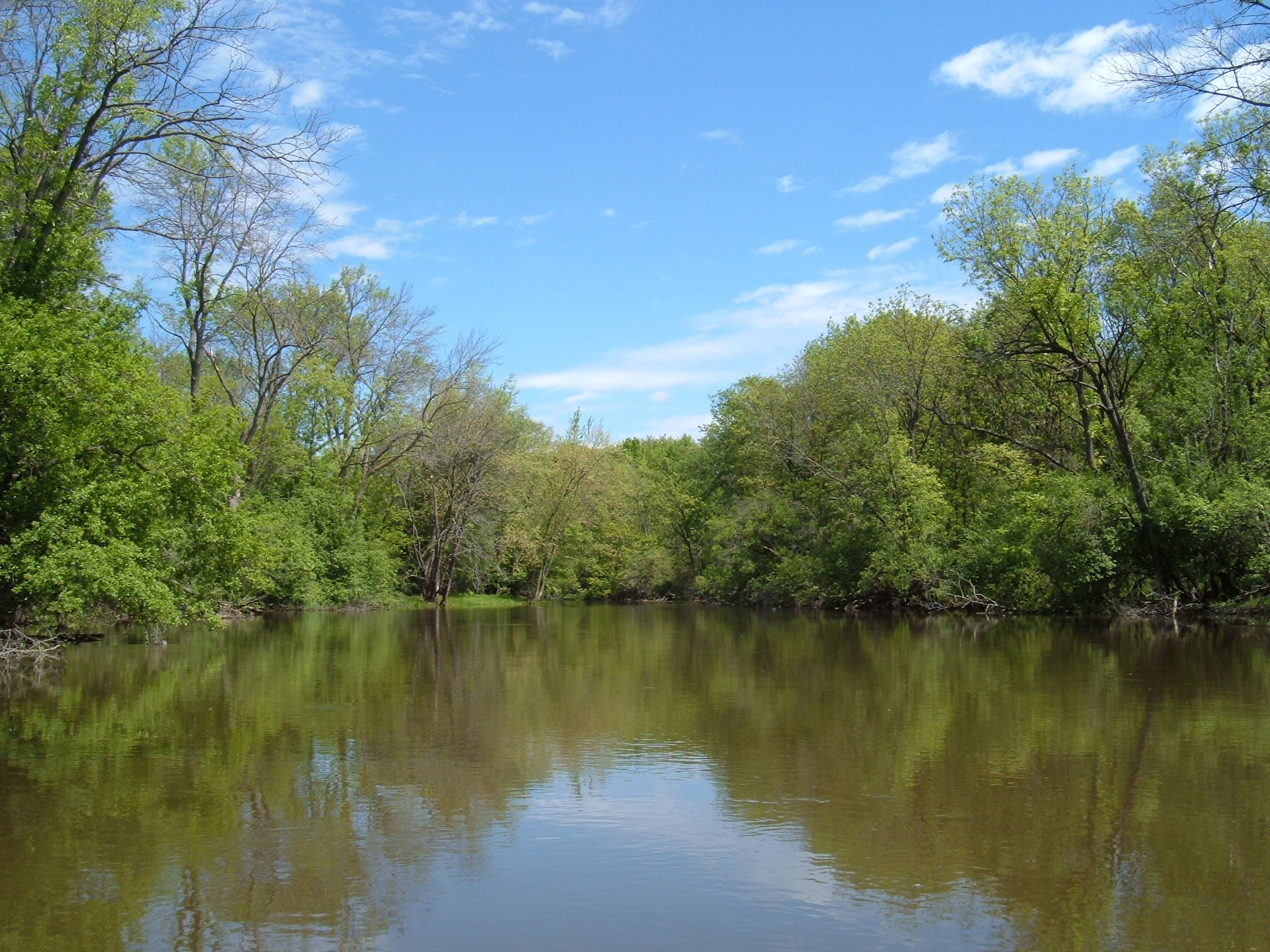
- A section of Des Plaines River in Lake County, Illinois

Location
- Country: United States

Physical characteristics
- Source
  - location: West of Kenosha, Kenosha County, Wisconsin
  - coordinates: 42.6736°N 88.0265°W
- Mouth
  - location: Illinois River
  - coordinates: 41.3898°N 88.2549°W
- Length: 133 mi (214 km)
- Basin size: 630 mi^{2} (1,600 km^{2})
- Discharge
  - location: Joliet, Illinois
  - average: 3,799 cu/ft. per sec.

Basin features
- Progression: Des Plaines River → Illinois → Mississippi → Gulf of Mexico

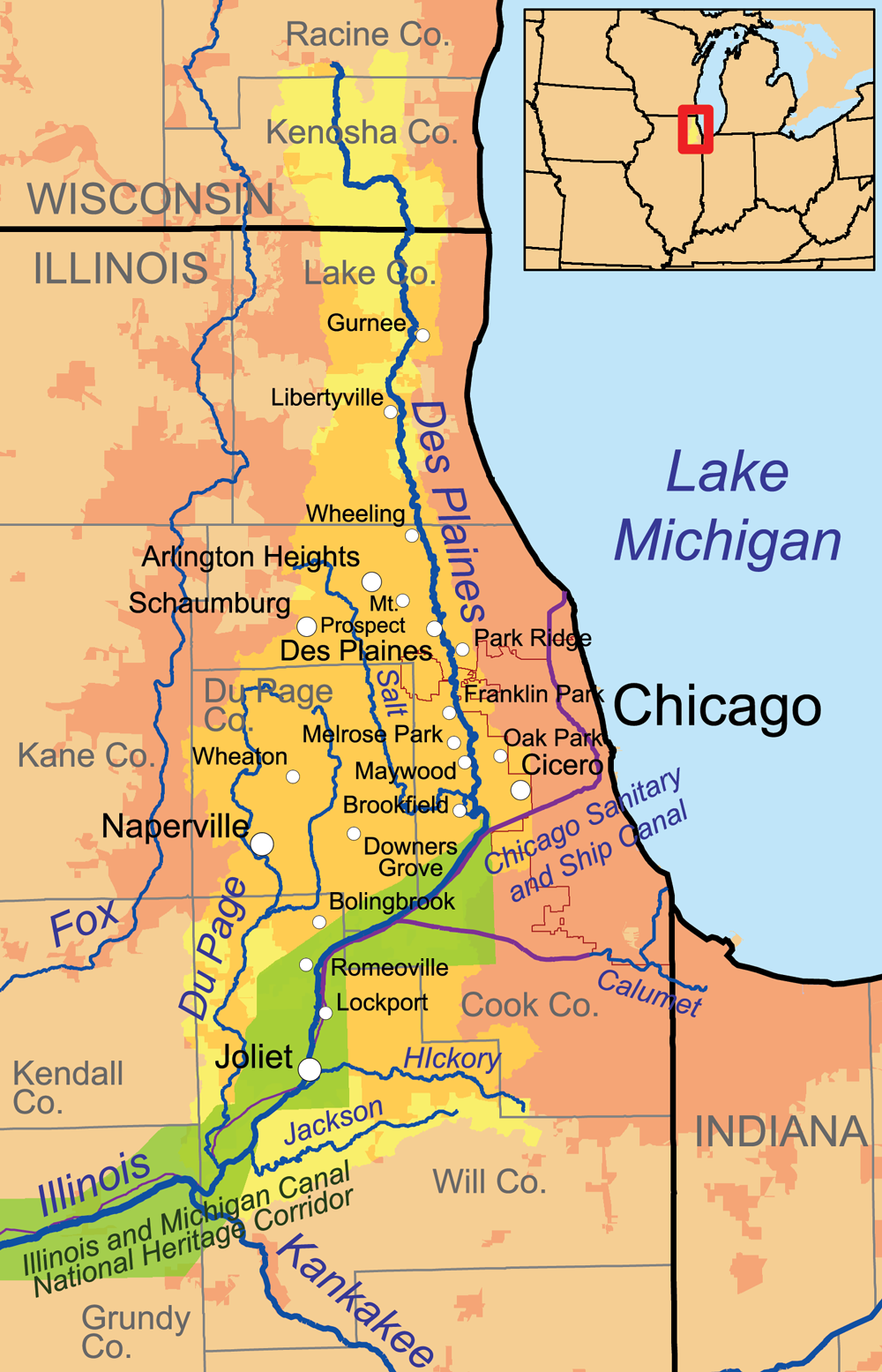
Map of the Des Plaines River drainage basin

The Des Plaines River (/dɪs ˈpleɪnz/ dis PLAYNZ) (French: Rivière des Plaines) is a river that flows southward for 133 miles (214 km) through southern Wisconsin and northern Illinois in the United States Midwest, eventually meeting the Kankakee River west of Channahon to form the Illinois River, a tributary of the Mississippi River.

Native Americans used the river as transportation route and portage. When French explorers and missionaries arrived in the 1600s, in what was then the Illinois Country of New France, they named the waterway La Rivière des Plaines (River of the Plains). The local Native Americans showed these early European explorers how to traverse waterways of the Des Plaines watershed to travel from Lake Michigan to the Mississippi River and its valley.

Parts of the river are now part of the Illinois Waterway and the Chicago Area Waterway System.

== Course and character ==
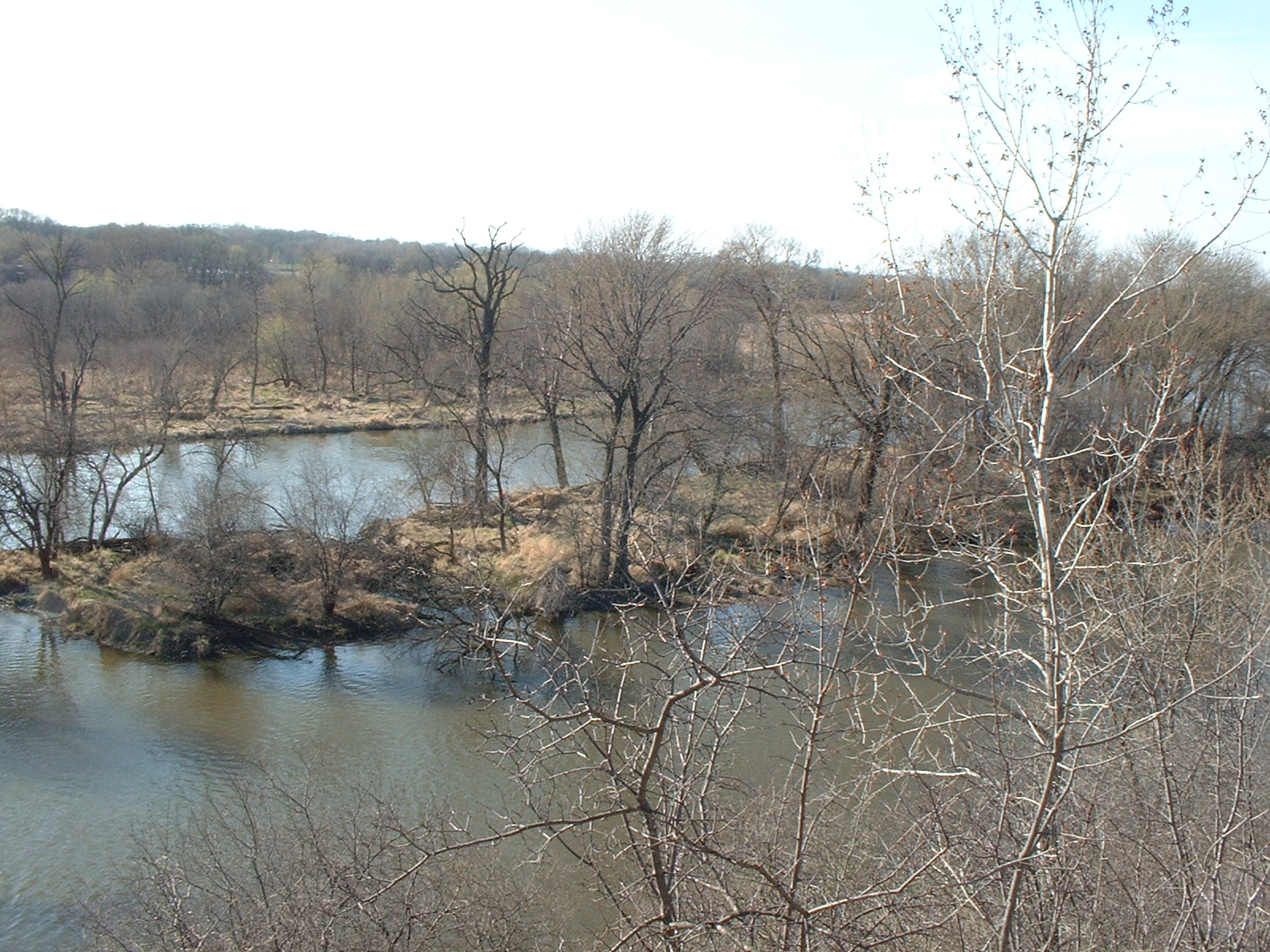
Des Plaines River near Lockport, Illinois

The slow-moving Des Plaines River rises in southern Wisconsin just west of Kenosha adjacent to the Great Lakes Dragaway and flows southward primarily through marshland, with a small eastbound kink before it crosses into Illinois. The river continues south through woodland forest preserve districts in Lake and Cook counties, and through the towns of Des Plaines, a northwestern suburb of Chicago, and Forest Park, River Forest, and the historic village of Riverside, western suburbs of Chicago. Numerous small fixed dams have been built on the river starting in central Lake County and continuing through Cook County. Eventually, the river turns to the southwest and joins with the Sanitary and Ship Canal in Lockport before flowing through the city of Joliet. Here it becomes part of the Chicago Area Waterway System and the longer Illinois Waterway.

In the heavily industrialized area around Joliet, dams control the river. A few miles southwest of Joliet, the Des Plaines converges with the Kankakee River to form the Illinois River. (41°23′28″N 88°15′31″W)

Those parts of the Des Plaines River preserved in a mostly natural state are used for conservation and recreation, while substantially altered sections serve as an important industrial waterway and drainage channel. The original course of the riverbed was moved to the west at the town of Lockport during the construction of the Sanitary and Ship Canal in 1905.

According to writer Gary Mechanic in Chicago Wilderness Magazine, as the Des Plaines River runs 95 miles (153 km) through four Illinois counties, it "changes from prairie creek to a suburban stream, to a large urbanized river, to a major industrial waterway."

Sections of the river in the Lake County and Cook County Forest Preserve districts in Illinois create "a nearly continuous greenway through all of Lake County and the northern section of Cook County." While canoe launching ramps are available, "The lack of ramps for trailered boats makes this long river a quiet, family-friendly river." This greenway also supports the Des Plaines River Trail, a multi-use trail that roughly follows the course of the Des Plaines River through Lake County and into Cook County.

== History ==
=== Etymology ===
The Des Plaines River was named by early French coureurs de bois sometime between the 17th and 18th centuries, after the trees lining the banks of the river. The word la plaine, in the 18th-century Mississippi Valley dialect of French spoken at the time, referred to either the American sycamore or the red maple, both of which resembled the European plane tree either in their palmate leaves or similar bark. This meaning of plaine survives in Canadian French: Plaine or Plaine rouge refers to an Acer rubrum, and Acer saccharinum is sometimes named a plaine blanche.

The English word for the plane tree came from the 14th century Old French word la plane. Since the later 18th century, the French word for the plane tree has evolved into le platane. As the Latin name for the plane tree is platanus, this transformation was likely done as a part of the attempts by late 18th-century French academics to change the spelling of many French words to what was perceived as their Latin origins. A side effect of such action was that the original French meaning of the name applied to the Des Plaines River was obscured. Today, des Plaines in modern Parisian French literally means "of the plains" or "of the prairie". This has led to confusion about the meaning of the original French name for the Des Plaines River.

Many people today believe that the river was named after the plains and prairies through which the river flows. But, in the 18th-century French dialect, it was more common to use the word "prairie" to indicate a plain, such as Prairie du Rocher in Illinois and Prairie du Chien in Wisconsin. Also, as noted above, it is more likely that the river was named in reference to the trees rather than the land. The French, like the Native Americans, traveled primarily by waterways rather than overland. The view of the prairie was nearly always blocked by trees. To this day a large number of both maples and sycamores grow along the Des Plaines River.

Although the original French name for the river has survived, its pronunciation has been altered. Today, locals pronounce it in an anglicized way (roughly "dess plains"), rather than according to the French pronunciation. It is also commonly referred to as "The DPR" by locals, citing its initials.

=== Tributaries ===
Northeast of Bristol, Wisconsin, Brighton creek flows into the river.

Jerome Creek and the Root River both converge with the Des Plaines near Pleasant Prairie, Wisconsin.

Mill Creek of Old Mill Creek flows through County Forest Preserve before entering the Des Plaines River.

Another tributary of the river near the Illinois–Wisconsin border is Osprey Lake, in Gurnee, Illinois, which flows through a small unnamed creek before dumping into the river.

Bull Creek in Libertyville, Illinois, flows into the Des Plaines near Independence Grove Forest Preserve.

In Lincolnshire, Illinois, Indian creek flows eastward into the Des Plaines River.

Near Chicago Executive Airport, the Wheeling Drainage Ditch of Wheeling, Illinois flows southeast through the town and adds to the river.

McDonald Creek in Mount Prospect, Illinois flows into the Des Plaines in Dam No. 2 Woods.

Southeast of Mount Prospect and due north of Des Plaines, Illinois, Weller Creek flows south into the DPR.

Half a mile east of O'Hare International Airport, Crystal Creek meanders its way into the Des Plaines.

Salt Creek of Hollywood, a neighborhood in Brookfield, Illinois, begins in Palatine and flows downstream into the river.

As the Des Plaines river begins to run parallel to the Chicago Sanitary and Ship Canal, Portage Creek enters the river.

Northwest of Lemont, Illinois, Goose Lake flows directly into the Des Plaines River.

The Des Plaines and the Sanitary and Ship Canal finally merge on the edges of Crest Hill, Illinois.

Hickory Creek flows into the Des Plaines at the bottom of the Brandon Road Dam.

Rock Run, Cedar Creek, and Jackson Creek all flow into the river near the border of Joliet, Illinois, and Channahon, Illinois, east of I-55.

The DuPage River merges with the Des Plaines in Channahon, Illinois.

About three miles downstream, the Kankakee River merges with the Des Plaines River to form the Illinois River.

=== Des Plaines River Bridge ===
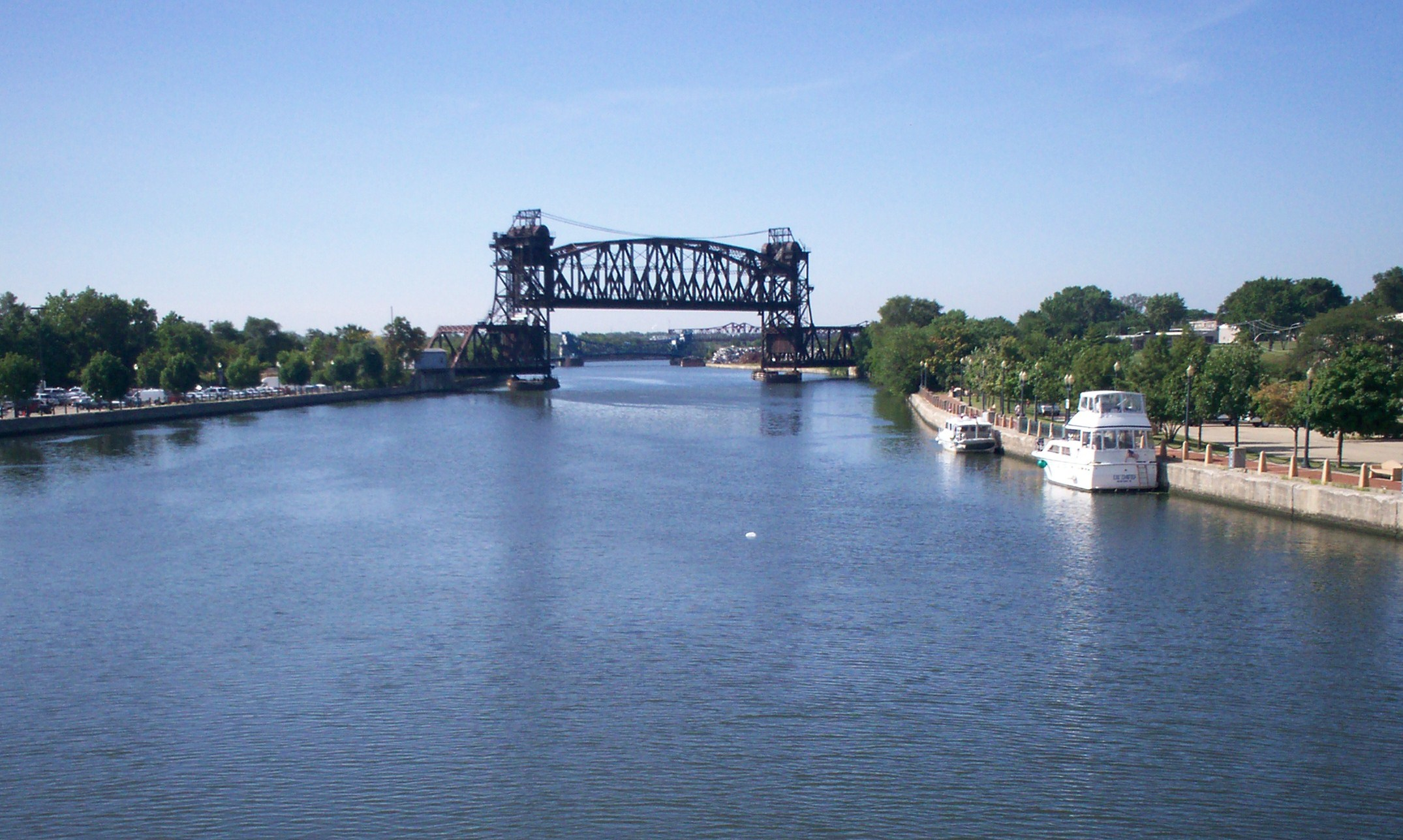
Des Plaines River in Joliet, Illinois

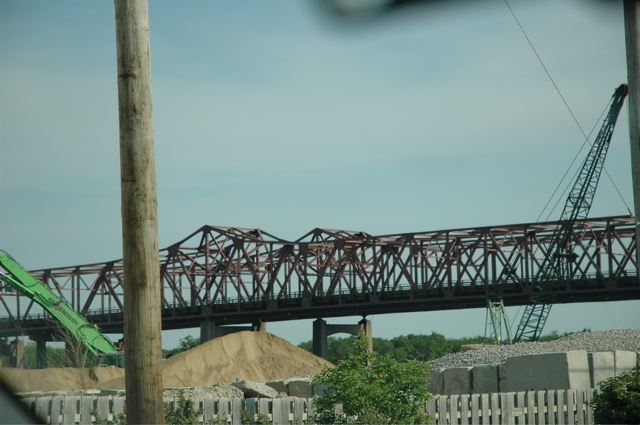
Des Plaines River Bridge in Joliet, Illinois

The Des Plaines River Bridge in Joliet is a cantilever bridge that is six lanes wide—three lanes traveling eastbound and westbound. The bridge is signed as part of Interstate 80. The bridge is located on the south side of Joliet.

=== Flood control projects ===
A Tunnel and Reservoir Plan (the Chicago Deep Tunnel) to reduce the harmful effects of floods and the flushing of raw sewage into Lake Michigan is semi-operational. It diverts storm water and sewage into temporary holding reservoirs. The megaproject is one of the largest civil engineering projects ever undertaken in terms of scope, cost and timeframe. Commissioned in the mid-1970s, the project is managed by the Metropolitan Water Reclamation District of Greater Chicago. Completion of the system is not anticipated until 2029, but substantial portions of the system have opened.

A modern flood control study stated that flooding on the Des Plaines River has caused significant damage and adverse economic impacts. The greatest recorded flood, in September 1986, caused an estimated $35 million in damage to 10,000 dwellings and 263 business and industrial sites. A Phase I flood control Project was authorized under the Water Resources Development Act of 1999. Project features include levee, dam, and reservoir expansion at a total cost of $50.5 million (in 2002).

On August 24, 2007, the river flooded by over 9 feet (2.7 m). On September 14, 2008, the river flooded after the area received more than 10 inches (250 mm) of rainfall over two days.

=== Crime ===
In the six months prior to his December 1978 arrest, serial killer John Wayne Gacy discarded the remains of at least four of his thirty-three known victims into the river, after finding no other suitable locations to dispose of them, due to the further twenty-nine known victims being buried in the crawlspace or other locations upon the grounds of his home.

=== Recreation ===
The Des Plaines River is the site of the Des Plaines River Canoe & Kayak Marathon. The race was founded in 1957 by Ralph Frese, and is the second oldest continual canoe race in the United States. Fishing is a common practice along the Des Plaines River with a steady game fish population of bluegills, carp, catfish, crappie, largemouth bass, northern pike, smallmouth bass and sunfish.

== See also ==
- Asian carp in North America
- Des Plaines River Trail
- Salt Creek Trail
