= Riverwoods, Illinois =

- Village
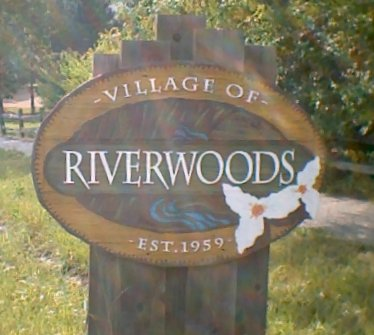
- Riverwoods Sign

- Flag

- Location of Riverwoods in Lake County, Illinois.

- Location within Chicago metropolitan area Location within Illinois Location within the United States
- Coordinates: 42°10′15″N 87°53′45″W
- Country: United States
- State: Illinois
- County: Lake
- Township: Vernon, West Deerfield

Government
  - Mayor: Kristine L. Ford

Area
  - Total: 4.02 sq mi (10.40 km^{2})
  - Land: 3.97 sq mi (10.27 km^{2})
  - Water: 0.046 sq mi (0.12 km^{2})

Population (2020)
  - Total: 3,790
  - Density: 955.3/sq mi (368.86/km^{2})
- Time zone: UTC-6 (CST)
  - Summer (DST): UTC-5 (CDT)
- ZIP Code(s): 60003, 60015
- Area code: 224 847
- FIPS code: 17-64538
- Wikimedia Commons: Riverwoods, Illinois
- Website: riverwoods.gov

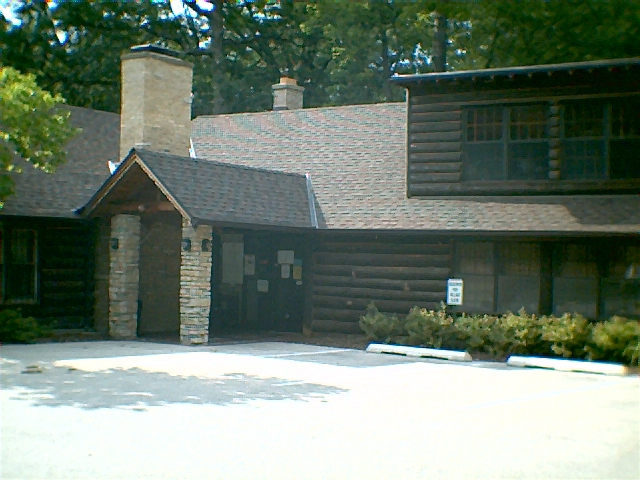
Riverwoods Village Hall

Riverwoods is a village in Lake County, Illinois, United States. It was established on the banks of the Des Plaines River in 1959 by local steel magnate Jay Peterson. Per the 2020 census, the population was 3,790. The corporate headquarters of CCH are located there, as well as Orphans of the Storm, an animal shelter founded in 1928 by famous dancer Irene Castle. The village used to host the annual "Arts & Riverwoods" festival.

== History ==
In 1885 a station for the Wisconsin Central Railroad was built near the modern day intersection of Deerfield Road and North Milwaukee Avenue that over time caused an increase in the local population. The first half of the 20th-century saw Riverwoods as a popular vacation spot. The Des Plaines River was often frequented by outdoorsman.

In 1959 the locals had Riverwoods incorporated as a village in order to halt development and protect their woodlands.

The 565 acre Edward L. Ryerson Conservation Area is considered the soul of the community after the Ryerson family began donating their land to the Lake County Forest Preserves in 1966.

== Geography ==
Riverwoods is a suburb of the city of Chicago, located in the extreme northeastern region of Illinois. According to the 2021 census gazetteer files, Riverwoods has a total area of 4.01 square miles (10.39 km^{2}), of which 3.97 square miles (10.28 km^{2}) (or 98.83%) is land and 0.05 square miles (0.13 km^{2}) (or 1.17%) is water.

=== Architecture ===
Riverwoods features many significant examples of midcentury residential design, including over 40 homes designed by "prairie modernist" architect Edward Humrich. A recent wave of teardowns and the lack of a local preservation ordinance led the Landmarks Preservation Council of Illinois to identify Riverwoods in 2006 as one of the Chicago region's communities most threatened by overdevelopment.

== Demographics ==
Historical population
| Census | Pop. | Note | %± |
|---|---|---|---|
| 1960 | 96 | | — |
| 1970 | 1,571 | | 1,536.5% |
| 1980 | 2,804 | | 78.5% |
| 1990 | 2,868 | | 2.3% |
| 2000 | 3,843 | | 34.0% |
| 2010 | 3,660 | | −4.8% |
| 2020 | 3,790 | | 3.6% |
U.S. Decennial Census; 2010 2020

=== Racial and ethnic composition ===
Riverwoods village, Illinois – Racial and ethnic composition Note: the US Census treats Hispanic/Latino as an ethnic category. This table excludes Latinos from the racial categories and assigns them to a separate category. Hispanics/Latinos may be of any race.
| Race / Ethnicity (NH = Non-Hispanic) | Pop 2000 | Pop 2010 | Pop 2020 | % 2000 | % 2010 | % 2020 |
|---|---|---|---|---|---|---|
| White alone (NH) | 3,560 | 3,332 | 3,142 | 92.64% | 91.04% | 82.90% |
| Black or African American alone (NH) | 14 | 26 | 20 | 0.36% | 0.71% | 0.53% |
| Native American or Alaska Native alone (NH) | 0 | 8 | 2 | 0.00% | 0.22% | 0.05% |
| Asian alone (NH) | 170 | 171 | 351 | 4.42% | 4.67% | 9.26% |
| Native Hawaiian or Pacific Islander alone (NH) | 1 | 0 | 0 | 0.03% | 0.00% | 0.00% |
| Other race alone (NH) | 4 | 1 | 10 | 0.10% | 0.03% | 0.26% |
| Mixed race or Multiracial (NH) | 18 | 20 | 128 | 0.47% | 0.55% | 3.38% |
| Hispanic or Latino (any race) | 76 | 102 | 137 | 1.98% | 2.79% | 3.61% |
| Total | 3,843 | 3,660 | 3,790 | 100.00% | 100.00% | 100.00% |

=== 2020 census ===
As of the 2020 census, there were 3,790 people, 1,262 households, and 1,076 families residing in the village. The population density was 944.20 inhabitants per square mile (364.56/km^{2}). There were 1,325 housing units at an average density of 330.09 per square mile (127.45/km^{2}).

The median age was 48.9 years. 22.8% of residents were under the age of 18 and 25.5% of residents were 65 years of age or older. For every 100 females there were 96.7 males, and for every 100 females age 18 and over there were 94.4 males age 18 and over. 100.0% of residents lived in urban areas, while 0.0% lived in rural areas.

Of the 1,262 households, 35.7% had children under the age of 18 living in them. Of all households, 80.0% were married-couple households, 5.8% were households with a male householder and no spouse or partner present, and 11.4% were households with a female householder and no spouse or partner present. About 9.7% of all households were made up of individuals, and 6.7% had someone living alone who was 65 years of age or older. The average household size was 2.97 and the average family size was 2.74.

There were 1,325 housing units, of which 4.8% were vacant. The homeowner vacancy rate was 0.5% and the rental vacancy rate was 9.1%.

=== Income and poverty ===
The median income for a household in the village was $231,477, and the median income for a family was $232,386. Males had a median income of $109,464 versus $45,526 for females. The per capita income for the village was $93,770. About 6.0% of families and 7.9% of the population were below the poverty line, including 18.0% of those under age 18 and 5.5% of those age 65 or over.

== Schools ==
Most of Riverwoods is part of Deerfield School District 109 for elementary and middle school, and part of Township High School District 113 for high school. Accordingly, these residents attend Wilmot Elementary School, South Park Elementary School, Caruso Middle School and Deerfield High School. Some areas of Riverwoods reside in Lincolnshire-Prairie View School District 103 or Bannockburn Elementary School District 106 for elementary school, and Adlai E. Stevenson District 125 for high school.

== Transportation ==
Pace provides bus service on Routes 234, 272 and 626 connecting Riverwoods to Des Plaines, Niles, Vernon Hills, and other destinations.

== Notable people ==
- Jackie Bange, Chicago television news anchor; lived in Riverwoods.
- Matt Cavanaugh (1956― ), quarterback and coach with several NFL teams; lived in Riverwoods.
- Jimmy Chamberlin (1964― ), former drummer for The Smashing Pumpkins, lived in Riverwoods from 2008 to 2014.
- Hal Gordon (1987― ), hot dog vendor and economist
- Devin Hester (1982― ), ex-wide receiver and kick returner for the Chicago Bears; lived in Riverwoods.
- Dave Kaplan (1960― ), Chicago sports radio and television personality; lives in Riverwoods.
- Luc Longley (1969― ), center with the Chicago Bulls, Phoenix Suns, and New York Knicks; lived in Riverwoods.
- Christina Loukas (1985― ), two-time Olympic athlete in 2008 and 2012, competing in 3-meter springboard diving; grew up in Riverwoods.
- Jannero Pargo (1979― ), guard with several NBA teams, lived in Riverwoods.
- Keith Van Horne (1957― ), ex-tackle for the Chicago Bears; lives in Riverwoods.
- Bruce Wolf (1953― ), Chicago television sports anchor; lived in Riverwoods.
