= William C. Dodge =

American politician (1880–1973)

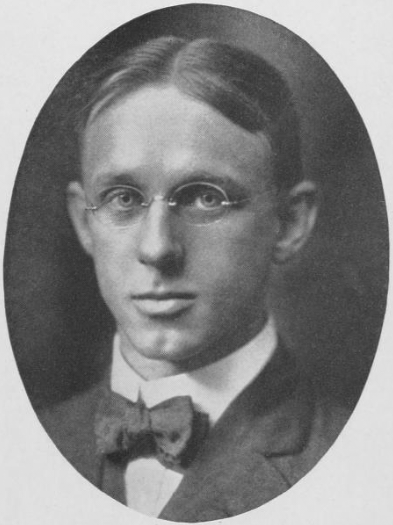

32nd New York County District Attorney
- In office January 1, 1934 – January 1, 1938
- Preceded by: Thomas C. T. Crain
- Succeeded by: Thomas E. Dewey

Member of the New York Senate from the 20th district
- In office January 1, 1919 – December 31, 1920

Personal details
- Born: September 6, 1880 Manchester, New Hampshire, U.S.
- Died: August 4, 1973 (aged 92) Lee, Florida, U.S.
- Party: Democratic
- Occupation: Lawyer, politician

William Copeland Dodge (September 6, 1880 – August 4, 1973) was an American lawyer and Democratic politician in New York City, New York, United States. He was an associate of the Tammany Hall political organization in the city.

== Early life ==
William Copeland Dodge was born on September 6, 1880 Manchester, New Hampshire, to Arthur Pillsbury Dodge (1849–1915) and Elizabeth Ann Day (1854–1927). The family moved to Chicago in 1891, and then to New York City in 1897. Dodge graduated from Stevens Institute of Technology, and from New York University School of Law. He was admitted to the bar in 1906. He later entered politics as a member of Tammany Hall; his patron was James Joseph Hines.

== Political career ==
He was elected in 1918 as a member of the New York State Senate (20th D.), serving in 1919 and 1920. As a State Senator he was active in urging an investigation of William Hamilton Anderson of the New York Anti-Saloon League.

In December 1924, he was appointed by D.A. Joab H. Banton as an Assistant D.A. of New York County. In 1927, he was appointed by Mayor Jimmy Walker as a city magistrate to fill the vacancy caused by the retirement of Norman J. Marsh.

In November 1933, Dodge was elected New York County District Attorney with promises to clean up the office by eliminating leaks. Leaks in the prosecution of racketeering cases had earlier led to intimidation of witnesses, thereby allowing more notable criminals to escape prosecution. His plan was to provide to the grand jury only the minimum information required to receive an indictment.

=== Runaway grand jury ===
In 1934, a grand jury was convened to investigate gambling in the city. The grand jury sat for 11 months, but resulted in only a few prosecutions. Charges were made that politicians were regularly fixing gambling cases. A memo by Mayor Fiorello La Guardia's office showed that between February 1 and September 30, 1934, 91% of the gambling cases brought by police never even came to trial, and of those that did come to trial, one third ended in fines usually under $50.

On March 4, 1935, Dodge convened a grand jury to investigate gambling, and in particular the actions of Dutch Schultz. The grand jury spent its time with other cases and information on witnesses was being leaked. Grand jurors complained that only junior investigators were assigned to them. Gambling kingpins were quoted in the newspapers boasting that they would never be indicted.

The jurors complained in open court about the problems on May 7, 1935, which was widely reported by the city newspapers. On May 22, 1935, Dodge agreed to appoint a special prosecutor from a list prepared by the New York County Lawyers Association. He balked at appointing any of the Republicans on the list because he considered them political opponents of Democrats. Instead, he selected H. H. Corbin, a compromise candidate proposed by former Republican Governor Nathan L. Miller, despite objections by the grand jurors. When the juror objections were made public, Corbin refused the appointment. The "runaway" grand jury disbanded in June, still complaining that the cases were not adequately being investigated.

On June 24, 1935, Governor Herbert H. Lehman said a new investigation would occur. Of the four names that were put forth, only Thomas E. Dewey accepted the task; he brought a series of successful prosecutions.

Dodge chose not to run for re-election in 1937, and he left office at the end of his term in December 1937. Republican Thomas Dewey was elected in November to succeed him as New York County Attorney.

It remains unclear whether Dodge criminally profited from the events. It was revealed that gangster Dutch Schultz paid $15,000 for his election. His patron Hines was quoted in his own trial as saying Dodge was "stupid, respectable, and my man." Dodge was never formally charged with any wrongdoing.

== Death and legacy ==
Dodge died on August 4, 1973, in Lee, Florida.

Dodge kept scrapbooks throughout his life documenting his career and personal interests. These scrapbooks are housed in the Special Collections of the Lloyd Sealy Library at John Jay College of Criminal Justice. Included in the Dodge Collection are materials related to his campaign and clippings from New York City newspapers that documented local crime at the time.

Political offices
Preceded by Salvatore A. Cotillo	New York State Senate (20th District); 1919–1920	Succeeded by Ward V. Tolbert
Legal offices
Preceded by Thomas C. T. Crain	New York County District Attorney; 1934–1937	Succeeded by Thomas E. Dewey
