= Deerbrook =

Deerbrook may refer to:

United States

- Deerbrook, Mississippi, an unincorporated community in Noxubee County
- Deerbrook, Wisconsin, an unincorporated community located in Langlade County
- Deerbrook Mall (Chicago), a shopping mall in Deerfield, Illinois
- Deerbrook Mall (Houston), a shopping mall in Humble, Texas
