= Deerbrook Mall =

Deerbrook Mall may refer to:

- Deerbrook Mall (Illinois), a shopping mall in Deerfield, Illinois, United States
- Deerbrook Mall (Texas), a shopping mall in Humble, Texas, United States
