= Blackburn College (Illinois) =

Private college in Carlinville, Illinois, US

- Former names: Blackburn Theological Seminary (1837–1869); Blackburn University (1869–1918)
- Type: Private college
- Established: 1837; 189 years ago
- Religious affiliation: Presbyterian Church (U.S.A.)
- President: Larry K. Lee
- Administrative staff: 51
- Students: 513 (Fall 2025)
- Location: Carlinville, Illinois, United States; 39.288°N 89.872°W
- Campus: Small town
- Nickname: Beavers
- Sporting affiliations: NCAA Division III – SLIAC
- Mascots: Barney the Beaver and Buzz the Athletic Beaver
- Website: blackburn.edu
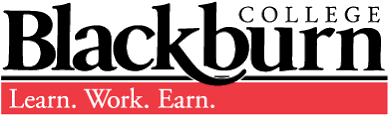

Blackburn College is a private college in Carlinville, Illinois. It was established in 1837 and named for Gideon Blackburn. The college is affiliated with the Presbyterian Church (USA).

Blackburn is one of 10 federally-recognized work colleges. It is the only work college with a student-managed work program that enables students to gain leadership experience as they manage other students in the work program. All resident students are required to work 10 hours per week, but the program is optional for commuters. Each student who works receives a tuition discount for the hours they work.

== History ==
Blackburn College was established in 1837 and named for the Rev. Gideon Blackburn, a Presbyterian minister who helped raise funds for the school. By 1855, instruction began at the college. Within two years (1857), the school was chartered as "Blackburn Theological Seminary", and the first unit of University Hall was erected. By 1862, several buildings had been developed for study on campus including space for the "Blackburn Academy", an organization for a campus grade and high school. From 1837 until 1864, the school only admitted male students. The first woman attended Blackburn in 1864, thereby sparking the movement of admitting female students. Also in 1864, the school was recognized and established as a four-year institution.

In 1869, a new charter was developed that changed the name from "Blackburn Theological Seminary" to "Blackburn University". In 1871, the first draft of the Blackburn Newspaper was established. Today, it is known as the "Burnian" and is the oldest college newspaper still published in Illinois.

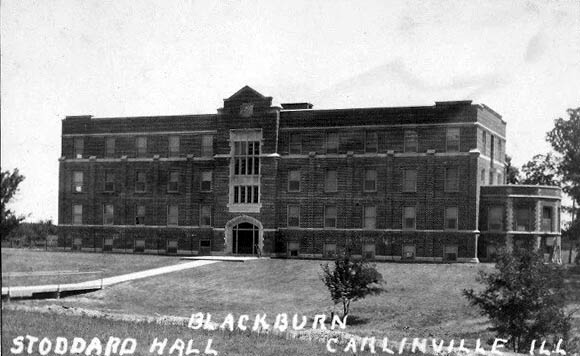
Stoddard Hall in the 1910s

William M. Hudson began his tenure as college president in 1911. A year later, he initiated the Student "Self Help Plan" which helped participating students pay $100 tuition in exchange to work 3 hours a day of manual labor. During President Hudson's tenure Blackburn showed much progress. Starting in 1916, students could receive a Certificate of Associates of Arts, and in 1917, the last Blackburn class graduated from the four-year institution.

In 1918, Blackburn would be established as a Junior College, revoking the charter to have a four-year institution; the school was thus renamed "Blackburn College". Between 1922 and 1924, a large project had been developed and the Construction of the central heating plant occurred between 1922 and 1924, along with the first (and oldest) residential building, Stoddard Hall. Stoddard Hall (1924-current) continues as the oldest student-constructed building on campus and continues to house current Blackburn College students.

McKinley House (1926) was constructed due to a gift given by Senator McKinley and serves as the housing unit for the college president and their family during their position at Blackburn College (formerly university). The 1930s offered a lot of progress and perseverance for the school. The previous years several buildings were plagued by fire and destruction; however, by 1930 Hudson Hall was constructed and served as the main academic building, replacing the previous building, which burnt down in 1927 (Old Main). The institution also discarded the Pullman cars as temporary housing units and discontinued the original Blackburn Academy. Other prominent additions were added during this time such as the Diary House, Dawes Gymnasium and the school being accredited by the North Central Associations of Colleges and Schools as a Junior College.

By 1947, the school was re-established as a Bachelor of Arts degree institution. Also, separately, the Library Annex was completed. Three years later, the institution was re-accredited as a four-year bachelor's degree obtaining institution. Jones-Allison Hall was constructed in 1949. The 1950s-1960s saw a lot of growth of academic and residential buildings completed. In 1964, the Lumpkin Library was completed, later known as the Lumpkin Learning Commons. At this point in time, the Associates of Arts degree had been discontinued.

The 1970s saw additions to older buildings and renovations to older spaces for more updates such as the development of a pool in the Dawes Gymnasium. By the year 2000 Hudson Hall had been completely renovated.

1983 marked the establishment of the Computer Center in Hudson Hall, which provided student access to a VAX 11/750 and some eighteen microcomputers.

In 2002, the construction of the Demuzio Campus Center (DCC) was completed, and operation ensued. This building houses areas which include the dining hall, snack bar, Student Affairs Office, Work Program Office, mail room, and Campus Bookstore.

2008 marked the completion of the construction of the Marvin and Ingrid Mahan Science Laboratory, which is one of the first LEED rated buildings in central Illinois and houses state-of-the-art laboratories for biology, chemistry, biochemistry, faculty offices, and a large enclosed atrium.

In 2009, the swimming pool was permanently closed.

From 2014 to 2016, several phases of the Lumpkin Learning Commons renovations were completed to have a new state-of-the-art Learning Center for students. The C.H.C. Anderson Center ("The Den") renovations were completed, and the center was renamed to "the Claire Jaenke Alumni Welcome Center in C.H.C. Anderson".

In 2017, the Dawes Fitness Center was completed and is located on the East side of the Dawes Gymnasium.

In 2019, Blackburn College announced and began the construction of an 8-acre solar farm, which was finished in August 2019.

== List of presidents ==
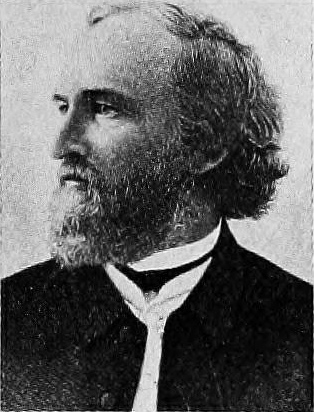
John W. Bailey, first president of Blackburn College

Number	Name	Term
-	John C. Downer	1859 – 1862
-	Robert B. Minton	1862 – 1867
1	John W. Bailey	1867 – 1876
interim	Robert B. Minton	1876 – 1877
2	Edwin L. Hurd	1877 – 1891
3	Richard Edwards	1891 – 1893
4	James E. Rogers	1893 – 1896
5	Walter H. Crowell	1896 – 1897
6a	Walter H. Bradley	1897 – 1905
7	Thomas W. Lingle	1905 – 1908
6b	Walter H. Bradley	1908 – 1912
8	William Mestrezat Hudson	1912 – 1945
9	Robert Ward McEwen	1945 – 1949
interim	Donald Matthew MacKenzie	1949
10	Robert Phillips Ludlum	1949 – 1965
11	Glenn Lowery McConagha	1965 – 1974
12	John Robert Alberti	1974 – 1982
13	William Foster Denman	July 1, 1982 – 1989
14	David Warfield Brown	1989 – 1991
15	Miriam R. Pride	1991 – June 30, 2013
16	John L. Comerford	July 1, 2013 – June 30, 2018
17	Julie Murray-Jensen	January 14, 2019 – December 19, 2019
interim	John McClusky	December 20, 2019 – August 14, 2020
18	Mark L. Biermann	August 15, 2020 – February 2023
19	Gregory Meyer	February 2023 – July 2024
20	Larry K. Lee	July 2024 – present

== Campus ==
Blackburn College has 13 academic/administrative buildings, 6 residence halls, and several athletic facilities throughout the campus. Many of these buildings were co-constructed by students as part of the college's Work Program. The campus itself lies on 80 acres of land in Carlinville, Illinois, a small, rural community about an hour north of downtown St. Louis.

Bordered by University Street to the west and Nicholas Street to the south, College Avenue serves as the main artery through the campus and enters through the gates of the college. Along this route, many historical campus landmarks can be seen, including Hudson Hall, Stoddard Hall, and Butler Hall, the three oldest buildings on campus.

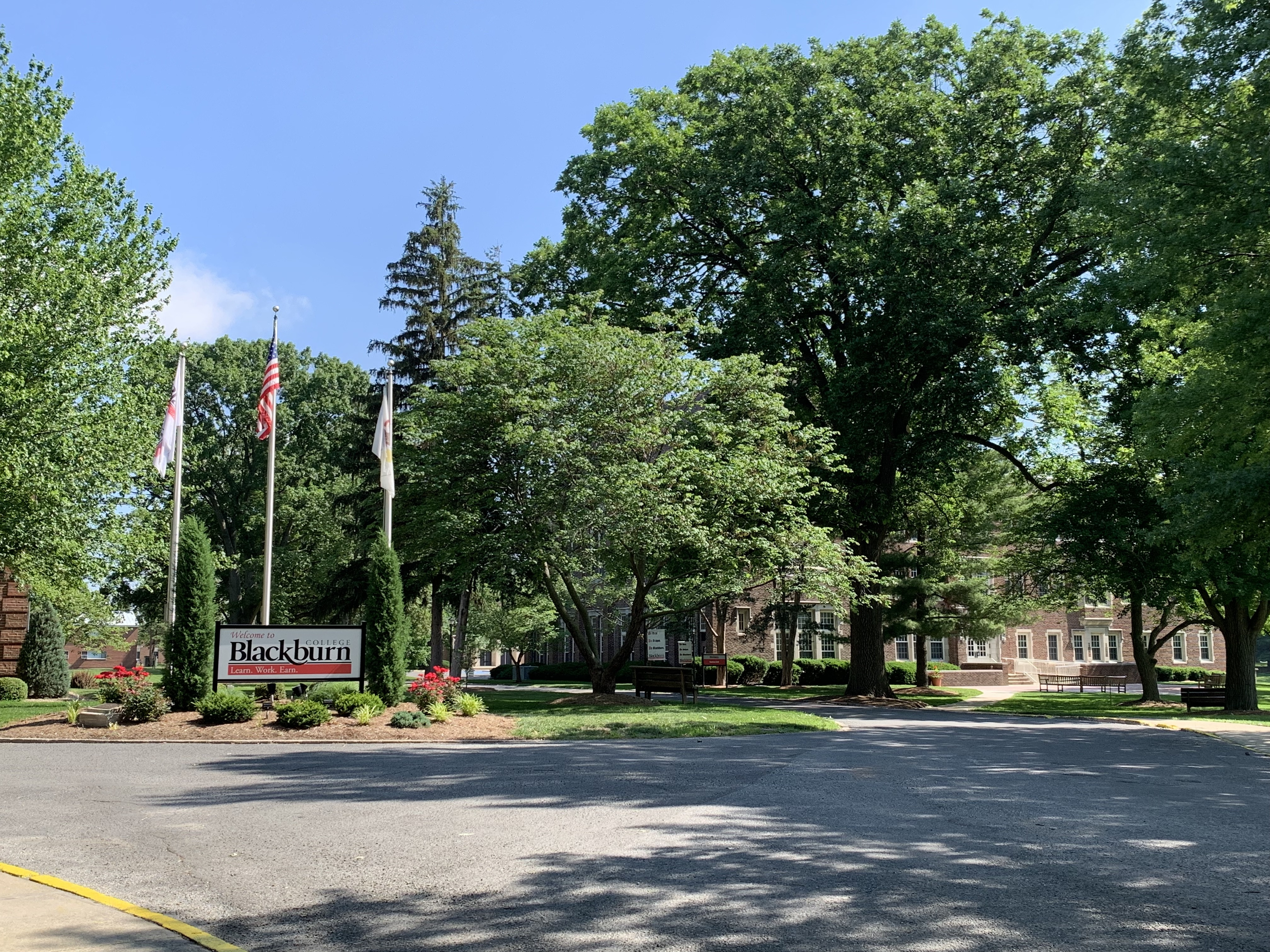
Welcome sign as seen from College Avenue

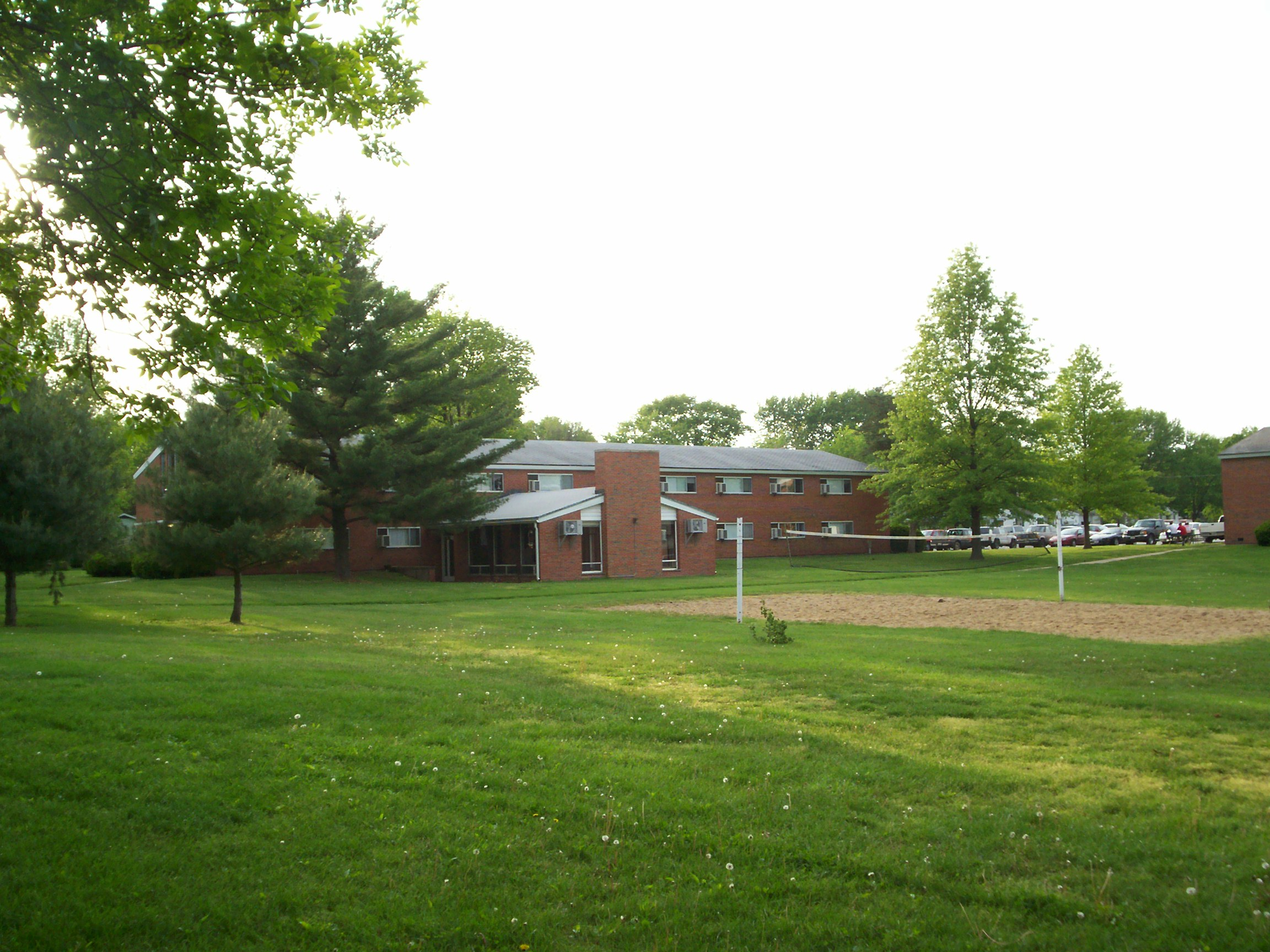
College quad

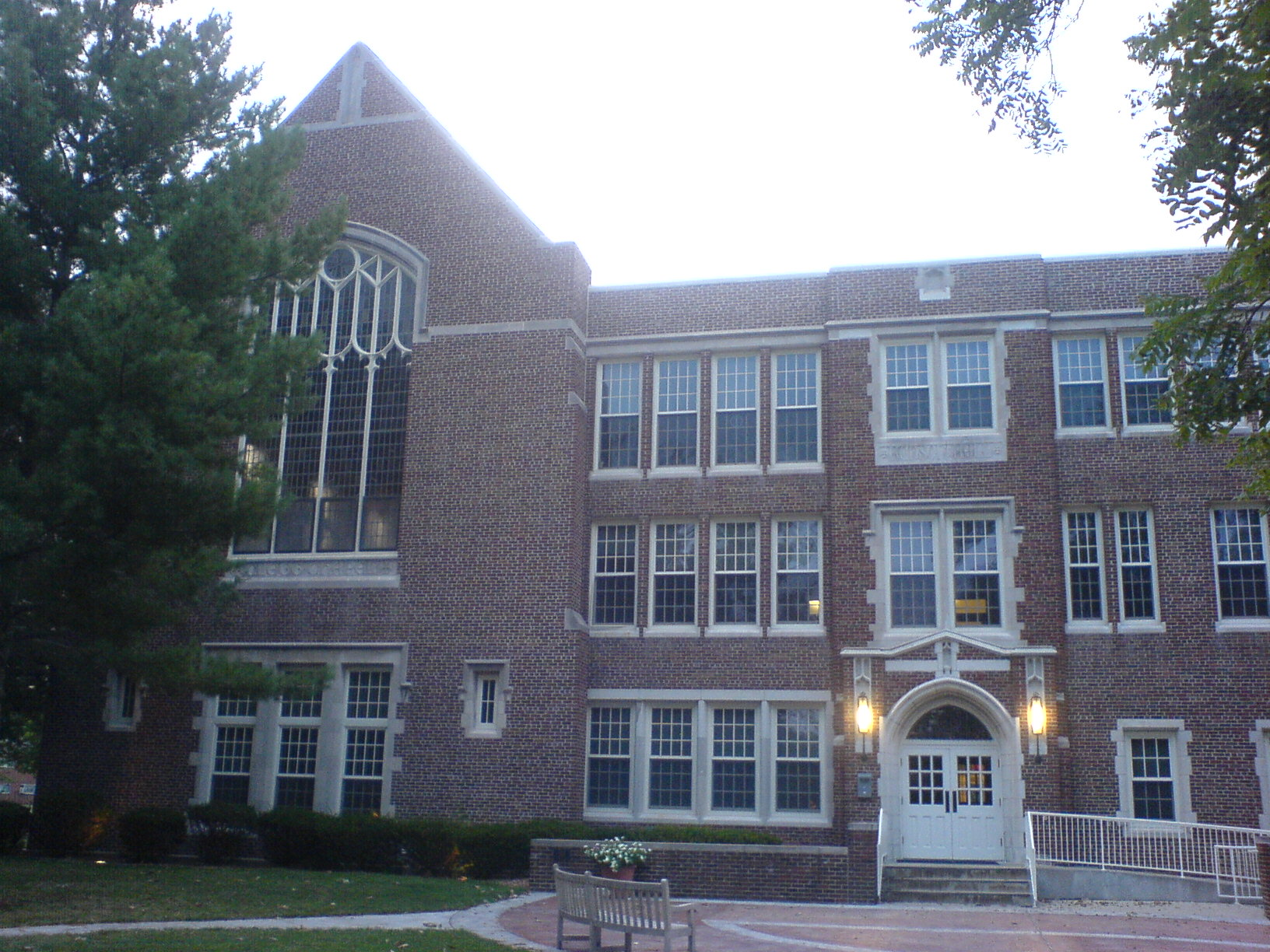
Hudson Hall, main academic building

== Academics ==
The institution is accredited by the Higher Learning Commission. 97% of the college's students are full-time, defined as taking a minimum of 12 credits a semester. If students are from an area that falls into the project MAP Grant, a minimum of 15 credits will be required to obtain that grant. 3% of the student population is part-time, allowing the majority of the campus to be full-time students. As of fall of 2023, of the students, 41% are male, 56% are female, and 3% are non-binary.

Blackburn College is one of many institutions that offer teaching license after the completion of the Education program in the desired division of education programming. Blackburn is accredited to license their teachers through the Illinois State Board of Education.

In 2021, Blackburn College removed standardized tests from the application process and joined the CommonApp network.

== Work Program ==
The Work Program was first instituted at Blackburn College in 1913 by William M. Hudson as a means to provide access to higher education to individuals with the academic ability but who lacked financial stability. Therefore, a cost reduction program began at Blackburn College. This "Self-Help Plan", as it was first called, required students to participate in 3 hours a day of manual labor in exchange for the payment of their tuition. This financial model remains an important value of the Work Program today. However, a larger emphasis is put on the opportunities it provides for student learning.

Today, the work program consists of 12 Work Departments: Academic Services, Administration Services, Athletic Services, Bookstore, Campus Community and Safety, Community Services, Dining and Hospitality, Lumpkin Student Success Center, Campus Services, Campus Maintenance, Snack Bar, and Technology Services.

As of 2020, all resident students work 160 hours each semester (10 hours a week) in partnership with faculty and staff to help provide all services essential to college operations.

Due to the COVID-19 pandemic, some on-campus work was offered remotely. Currently, in-person work for the work program has resumed.

== Athletics ==
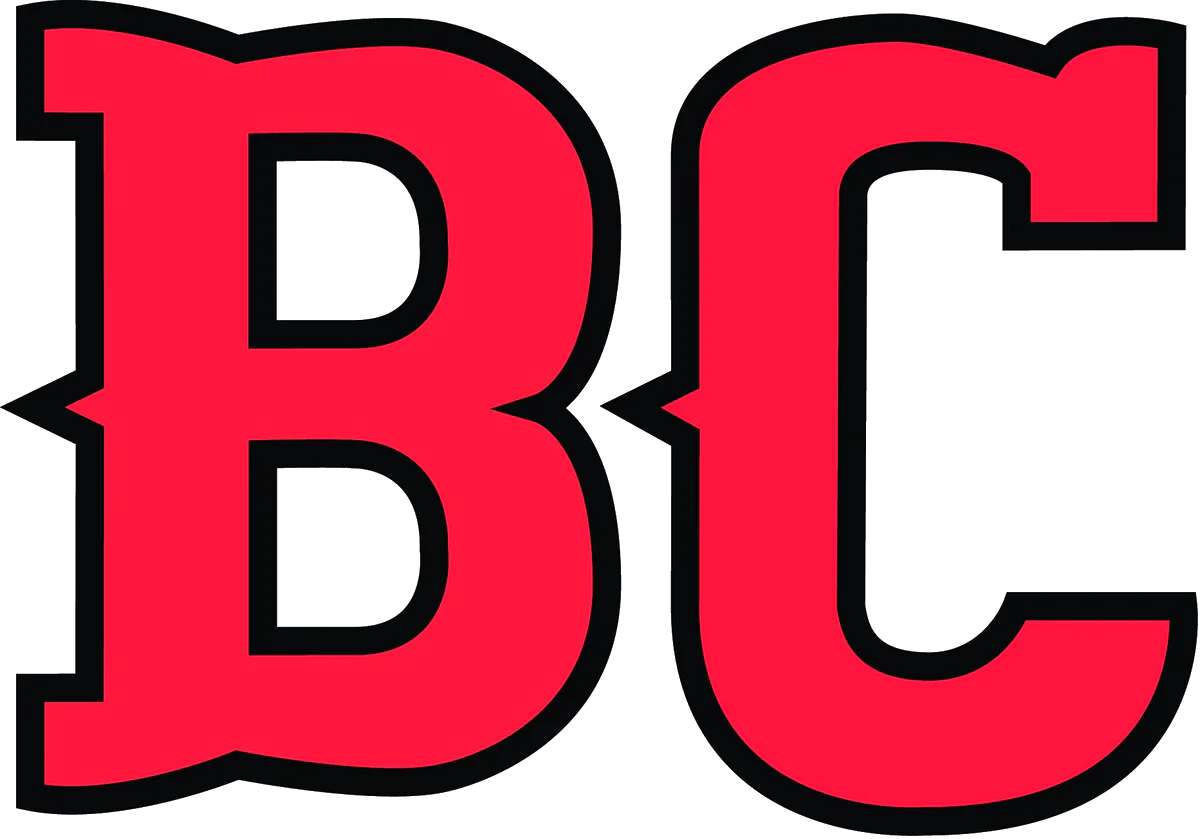
Blackburn athletics monogram

Blackburn's athletics teams, nicknamed the Beavers, compete in Division III of the NCAA's St. Louis Intercollegiate Athletic Conference. Blackburn, whose teams are known athletically as the Beavers, was a member of the Illinois Intercollegiate Athletic Conference from 1914 to 1923.

The college currently fields teams in baseball, basketball, cross country, golf, soccer, softball, track and field, volleyball, and wrestling. The men's golf team earned the most recent SLIAC championship in 2010.

In January 2009, the college announced that it would stop fielding a football team after the 2008–2009 school year.

== Notable alumni ==
- Mary Hunter Austin, nature writer and novelist
- Anthony Beale, Chicago alderman and congressional candidate
- Pug Bennett, Major League Baseball player for St. Louis Cardinals
- Karl Berning, Illinois State Senator
- Paul M. Bingham, molecular biologist
- Herman E. Brockman, geneticist
- Frank W. Burton, Illinois state legislator and judge
- Lois B. DeFleur, sociologist, former president of Binghamton University
- Clarence J. Goodnight, zoologist
- Mark Kirk, former U.S. Senator from Illinois (attended briefly)
- Peter F. Mack Jr., U.S. Congressman
- Kossoy Sisters, singing act
- Truman H. Landon, General and Commander, U.S. Air Force
- Bruce Pavitt, cofounder of Sub Pop Records (attended briefly)
- Dennis Phillips, professional poker player
- Charles Robertson, entomologist
- Craig F. Stowers, Chief Justice of the Alaska Supreme Court
- Jamie Young, assistant coach, Boston Celtics
- Sam McCann, Illinois State Senator, 49th District, Later 50th District
- William L. Mounts, Illinois House of Representatives and Senators
- John Thomson Faris, Editor, Author, and Clergyman
- Richard D. Alexander, zoologist
- William Hamilton Anderson, superintendent of the New York Anti-Saloon League
- David Felmley, educator, president of Illinois State University from 1900 to 1930
- Leandro, Brazilian professional soccer player
