= Charles A. Perkins =

New York District Attorney

Charles Perkins
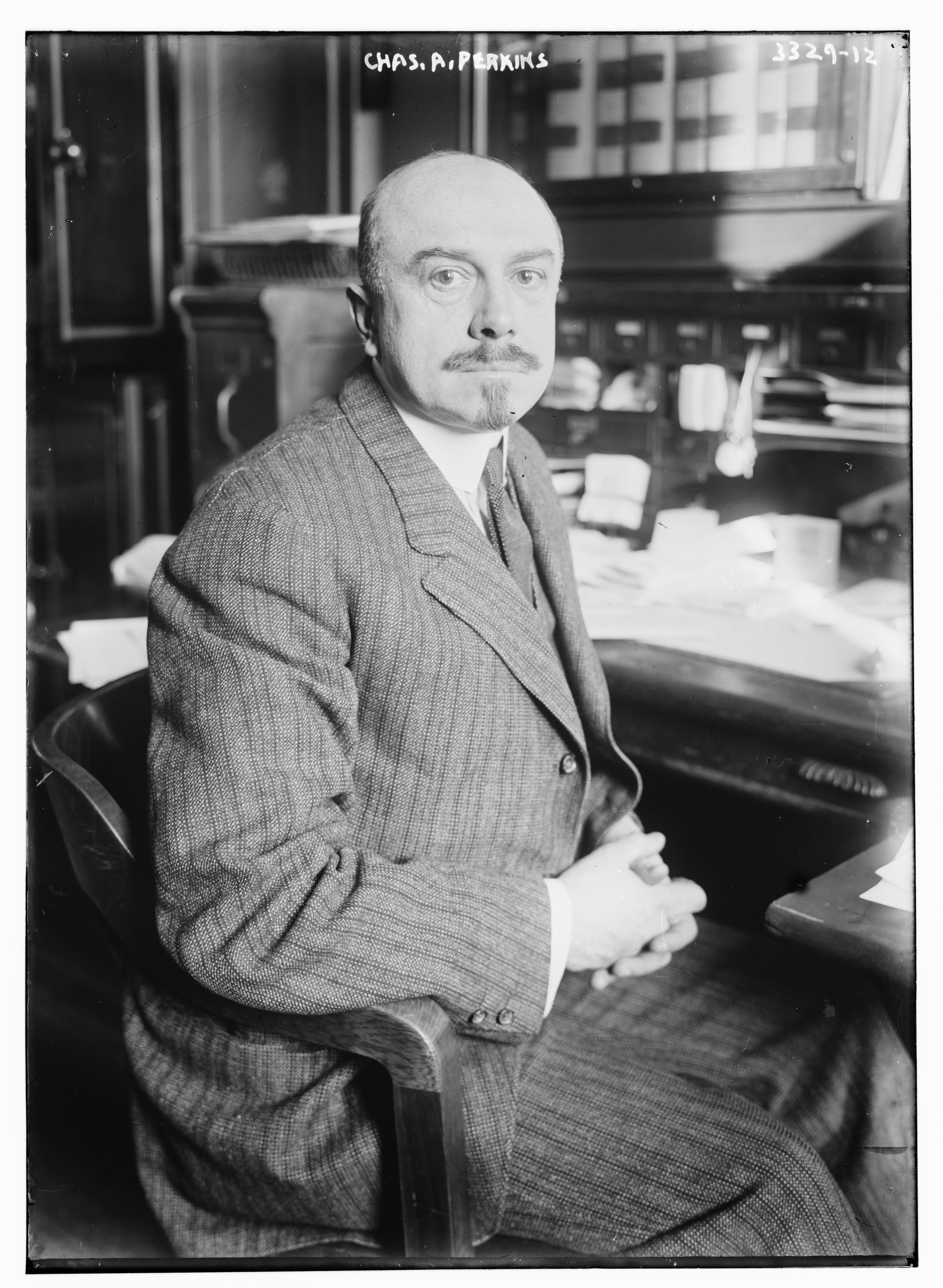

New York County District Attorney
- In office 1915–1915
- Preceded by: Charles S. Whitman
- Succeeded by: Edward Swann

Personal details
- Born: Charles Albert Perkins; January 26, 1869 Lawrence, Massachusetts, United States
- Died: January 16, 1930 (aged 60) Suffern, New York
- Party: Republican
- Spouse: Miriam Nancy Shelton Rogers
- Children: Albert Perkins
- Parent(s): Albert C. and Caroline Perkins
- Education: Adelphi Academy
- Alma mater: Dartmouth College
- Occupation: Lawyer and reformer
- Known for: New York District Attorney who prosecuted underworld figures prior to and during Labor Slugger War; later special prosecutor for City Trust case in 1928–29.

Charles Albert Perkins (January 26, 1869 – January 16, 1930) was an American lawyer and reformer who was New York County District Attorney in 1915. While with the District Attorney's office, Perkins prosecuted many of the city's gang leaders, labor racketeers and other underworld figures during the early 20th century. He also served as special prosecutor for several major state investigations into corruption most notably the City Trust cases of 1928–29.

== Early life ==
Charles Perkins was born to Albert C. and Caroline Perkins in Lawrence, Massachusetts on January 26, 1869.

Attending public school in Exeter, New Hampshire, his father was principal of the Phillips Exeter Academy from 1873 to 1883 and later accepted a position at Adelphi Academy in Brooklyn, New York where Perkins attended until the age of 18. He graduated from Dartmouth College in 1890, where he was elected permanent secretary of his class.

== Career ==
Perkins returned to New York to take a position as a clerk in the law offices of Kenneson, Crain & Alling. Thomas C.T. Crain, another New York District Attorney, was also a member of the firm.

In 1893, Perkins received his law degree from the New York Law School and admitted to the bar. He entered private practice with Edward C. Bailey and, two years later, was an assistant to the prosecution during the Lexow Committee investigation. Perkins was involved in drawing up plans for the consolidation of present-day New York City and, in 1897, he was named Deputy Assistant District Attorney by William M.K. Olcott. Continuing private practice for another four years, he was appointed Deputy Assistant District Attorney in 1902 and Assistant District Attorney two years later. During his thirteen years in the District Attorney's office, while in charge of the bureau of indictments and extradition, he personally prepared over 75,000 indictments for grand jury consideration.

After the election of D.A. Charles S. Whitman as Governor of New York in 1914, Perkins was appointed his successor and took office as New York County District Attorney on January 1, 1915. During his year in office, Perkins joined the New York City Police Department in their campaign against the New York underworld. As well as obtaining a record number of convictions of major gang leaders, he also headed prosecutions against labor racketeers involved in the first "Labor Slugger War". He was nominated for re-election by the New York Republicans over Frank Moss but lost the election to Judge Edward Swann in November 1915, and resumed his private practice at the beginning of 1916.

Perkins formed a partnership with writer Arthur Train and later joined the law firm of Perkins, Malone & Washburn remaining with them for the rest of his career. He was also retained for a number of high-profile city trust cases. In 1921, he was appointed special prosecutor in the Lockwood Committee's investigation of building supplies. In June 1928, Perkins was named prosecutor by Moreland Commissioner Robert Moses in the state investigation of the Banking Department and the cases arising from the failure of the City Trust Company. He also served on numerous committees for the New York County Bar Association including serving as chairman during a committee investigation into police brutality in 1929. Resigning his position as special prosecutor due to poor health in August 1930.

== Personal life ==
He married Miriam Nancy Shelton Rogers and together had a son, Albert Perkins, who was born a year after their marriage on August 27, 1904.

He died at his home in Suffern, Rockland County, New York, on January 16, 1930. His funeral was held at the Fifth Avenue Presbyterian Church on Fifth Avenue and Fifty-Fifth Street with his body later being cremated.

Legal offices
Preceded by Charles S. Whitman	New York County District Attorney; 1915	Succeeded by Edward Swann
