= Senator Mount =

Senator Mount may refer to:

- James A. Mount (1843–1901), Indiana State Senate
- Willie Mount (born 1949), Louisiana State Senate

== See also ==
- William L. Mounts (1862–1929), Illinois State Senate
