= Joab H. Banton =

American lawyer (1869–1949)

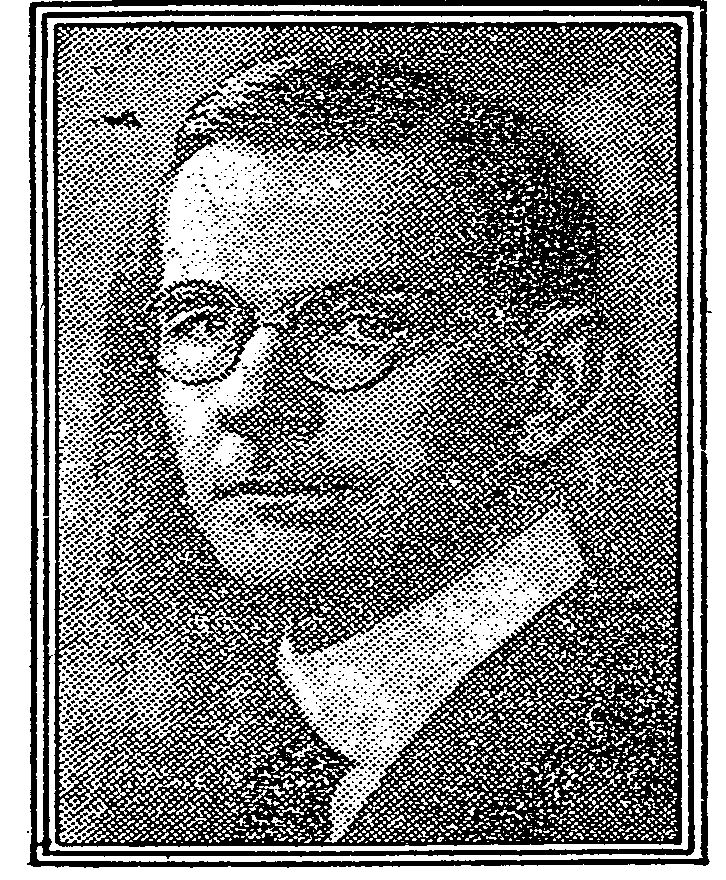
- Banton in 1925

30th District Attorney of New York County
- In office January 1, 1922 – December 31, 1929
- Preceded by: Edward Swann
- Succeeded by: Thomas C. T. Crain

Personal details
- Born: August 27, 1869 Huntsville, Texas, US
- Died: July 20, 1949 (aged 79)
- Party: Democratic
- Spouse: Maud Harris (m. 1896)
- Education: Kentucky University (BA)

Joab Hamilton Banton (August 27, 1869 – July 20, 1949) was New York County District Attorney from 1922 to 1929.

== Early life and education ==
He was the son of Joab H. Banton, a judge in Waco, Texas, and Imogene (Hamilton) Banton. He graduated with a Bachelor of Arts from Kentucky University in 1890 and was admitted to the bar in Texas in 1891. On June 17, 1896, he married Maud Harris in Belton, Texas. Afterwards, he moved to New York City and continued his law practice there.

== Career ==
In January 1918, he was appointed by D.A. Edward Swann as an Assistant D.A. He remained in office until August 1919, when he resigned to resume his private practice as a partner in Banton, Ferguson & Moore. In July 1920, he defended D.A. Swann in a one-million-dollar suit brought by Gaston Means. Swann, Chief Assistant D.A., appointed Banton in January 1921, and during most of the year, Banton acted as District Attorney while Swann remained out of state. In November 1921, Banton was elected as New York County District Attorney on the Tammany Hall ticket, defeating the "Coalition" candidate John Kirkland Clark. On taking office in January 1922, Banton appointed Ferdinand Pecora as his Chief Assistant D.A.

As D.A., Banton indicted over 100 bucket shops during the Roaring 20s. In 1924, he was convicted of defrauding William H. Anderson of the New York Anti-Saloon League on fraud charges.

In 1925, he was re-elected with a large plurality over Ex-Governor Charles S. Whitman, who had been New York County D.A. from 1910 to 1914. Banton was instrumental in establishing peace between the On Leong Chinese Merchants Association and the Hip Sing Association in the Tong War to control Chinatown.

His office investigated the murder of Arnold Rothstein and prosecuted George "Hump" McManus, who was acquitted.

== See also ==
- Edward M. Fuller & Company

== Sources ==
- BANTON RESIGNS POST in NYT on August 28, 1919
- SWANN ANSWERS MEANS in NYT on July 3, 1920
- CLARK, IN OPEN TILT, BOMBARDS BANTON in NYT on October 31, 1921
- BANTON ASKS DEITY TO GUIDE HIS TERM in NYT on January 2, 1922

Legal offices
Preceded by Edward Swann	New York County District Attorney; 1922–1929	Succeeded by Thomas C. T. Crain
