= Deerfield, Illinois =

- Village
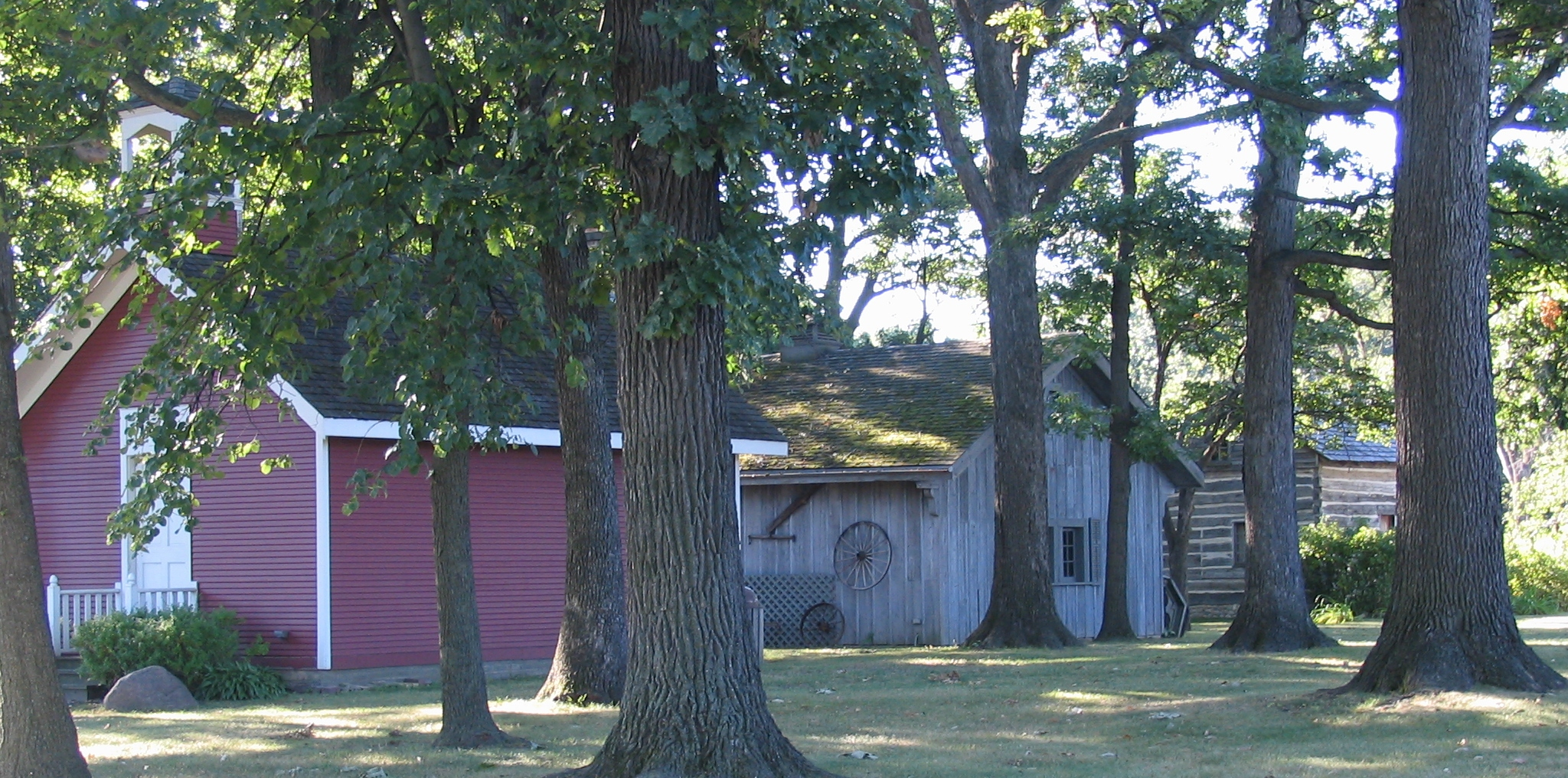
- Deerfield Historic Village

- Flag Logo
- Motto: "The community that lives and works together"
- Location of Deerfield in Lake and Cook counties, Illinois
- Coordinates: 42°09′54″N 87°51′55″W
- Country: United States
- State: Illinois
- Counties: Lake, Cook
- Township: West Deerfield, Moraine, Vernon
- Founded: 1903
- Named for: Deerfield, Massachusetts

Government
  - Type: Council–manager government

Area
  - Total: 5.55 sq mi (14.38 km^{2})
  - Land: 5.53 sq mi (14.32 km^{2})
  - Water: 0.023 sq mi (0.06 km^{2})
- Elevation: 669 ft (204 m)

Population (2020)
  - Total: 19,196
  - Density: 3,471.1/sq mi (1,340.21/km^{2})
- Time zone: UTC-6 (CST)
  - Summer (DST): UTC-5 (CDT)
- ZIP Code: 60015
- Area codes: 847, 224
- FIPS code: 17-18992
- GNIS feature ID: 2398705
- Website: Official website

Deerfield is a village in Lake and Cook counties in the U.S. state of Illinois. A northern suburb of Chicago, Deerfield is located on the North Shore, about 28 miles (45 km) north of downtown Chicago. The population was 19,196 at the 2020 census.

Deerfield is home to the headquarters of Walgreens Boots Alliance, Baxter Healthcare, and Fortune Brands Home & Security. Deerfield is often listed among the wealthiest and highest-earning places in Illinois and the Midwest. According to the United States Census Bureau, the median household income in Deerfield was $185,762 in 2022.

== History ==
=== Beginnings ===
Originally populated by the Bodéwadmiakiwen (Potawatomi), Myaamia (Miami), Kiikaapoi (Kickapoo), and Peoria Native Americans, the area was settled by Horace Lamb and Jacob B. Cadwell in 1835 and named Cadwell's Corner. A shopping center located on the site of Cadwell's farm at Waukegan Road and Lake Cook Road still bears that name. The area grew because of the navigable rivers in the area, notably the Des Plaines River and the Chicago River.

By 1840, the town's name was changed to "Leclair". Within a decade, settler John Millen proposed a further name change to "Deerfield" in honor of his hometown, Deerfield, Massachusetts and the large number of deer living in the area. At the time, the alternate name for the village on the ballot was "Erin". "Deerfield" won by a vote of 17–13.

The village's first school, Wilmot School, was founded in 1847. Originally a one-room schoolhouse, Wilmot is now an elementary school which serves 548 students. It is located on land donated by Lyman Wilmot, whose wife, Clarissa, was the village's first schoolteacher.

The village was incorporated in 1903, with a population in the low 400s.

In the 1850s, the Deerfield home of Lyman Wilmot served as a stop on the Underground Railroad as escaped slaves attempted to get to Canada.

=== 20th century ===
In a 1917 design by Thomas E. Tallmadge of the American Institute of Architects, Deerfield (and adjacent Highland Park) served as the center for a new proposed capital city of the United States. By that year, all of Deerfield's original farms had been converted either to residential areas or golf courses.

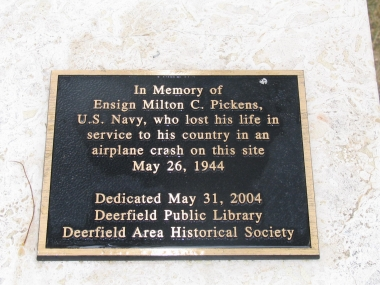
Pickens memorial plaque

On May 26, 1944, a US Navy plane crashed in Deerfield on the current site of the Deerfield Public Library, killing Ensign Milton C. Pickens. Following World War II, a portion of Waukegan Road (Route 43) that runs through Deerfield was designated a Blue Star Memorial Highway.

In 1959, when Deerfield officials learned that a developer building a neighborhood of large new homes planned to make houses available to African Americans, they issued a stop-work order. An intense debate began about racial integration, property values, and the good faith of community officials and builders. For a brief time, Deerfield was spotlighted in the national news as "the Little Rock of the North." Supporters of integration were denounced and ostracized by angry residents. Eventually, the village passed a referendum to build parks on the property, thus putting an end to the housing development. Two model homes already partially completed were sold to village officials. The developer, Morris Milgram, sued the city charging that it had violated the Fourteenth Amendment. The Illinois Supreme Court ruled against Milgram, who then appealed to the U.S. Supreme Court, which refused to consider the case. The remaining land lay dormant for years before it was developed into Mitchell Pool and Park and Jaycee Park. At the time, Deerfield's black population was 12 people out of a total population of 11,786. This episode in Deerfield's history is described in But Not Next Door by Harry and David Rosen, both residents of Deerfield. On June 18, 2020, the Deerfield Park District Board voted to remove James Mitchell's name from the park and later renamed it to Floral Park, which was the name originally intended for the sub-division that would have been built at that location.

Since the early 1980s, Deerfield has seen a large influx of Jews, Asians, and Greeks, giving the community a more diverse cultural and ethnic makeup.

On June 27, 1962, ground was broken by Kitchens of Sara Lee (now Sara Lee Corporation) for construction of the world's largest bakery. The plant, located on the current site of Coromandel Condominiums on Kates Road, began production in 1964 using state-of-the-art materials handling and production equipment. It was billed as the world's first industrial plant with a fully automated production control system and was designed by Stanley Winton. President Ronald Reagan visited the plant in 1985. The plant closed in 1990 as Sara Lee consolidated production in Tarboro, North Carolina. By 1991, headquarters employees had moved to downtown Chicago. In 2007, Sara Lee severed its final tie to its former home town with the closure of the Sara Lee Bakery Outlet Store.

In 1982, Deerfield began an experiment with a community farm. Two hundred residents applied for plots on a 3-acre (12,000 m^{2}) community garden. The project had such a strong initial success that the village opened additional community farms on vacant land in the village.

As of 1987 Deerfield was mostly made up of single-family houses. As of that year the resale prices of Deerfield houses ranged from $100,000 to $300,000. 43.5% of the town's land consisted of single-family houses, while 1.1% contained multi-family housing. As of that year little of the remaining land was available for further residential development.

=== 21st century ===
On December 19, 2005, the village board passed a strict anti-smoking ordinance. The law bans smoking in all public places, including businesses, bars, restaurants, parks, parade routes, public assemblies, and within 25 feet (7.6 m) from any of the above.

In November 2007, BusinessWeek.com listed Deerfield third in a list of the 50 best places to raise children. The rankings were based on five factors: school test scores, cost of living, recreational and cultural activities, number of schools and risk of crime. Deerfield ranked behind Groesbeck, Ohio, and Western Springs, Illinois.

In 2015, a plan to rezone a parcel of land originally zoned for single-family homes, in order to allow the construction of a 48-unit affordable apartment building complex, was proposed. Some Deerfield residents were opposed to the proposition.

In 2018, the Village Board of Trustees unanimously approved a ban on what were described as certain types of assault weapons and high-capacity magazines, amending a 2013 ordinance that regulated the storage of those items. This was done despite an Illinois State Preemption on any further municipal firearms restrictions after 2013, and the fact that amendments to municipal ordinances have to pass said amendments as separate ordinances. Lawsuits were filed challenging the Ordinance and the ban was eventually blocked by Lake County Circuit Court Judge Luis Berrones until the lawsuits could be heard. One of the lawsuits is based on the Illinois state preemption statute regarding local bans enacted after 2013.

Deerfield was a sister city with Lüdinghausen, Germany, until the commission was dissolved in October 2019 due to inactivity.

=== Deerfield Historic Village ===
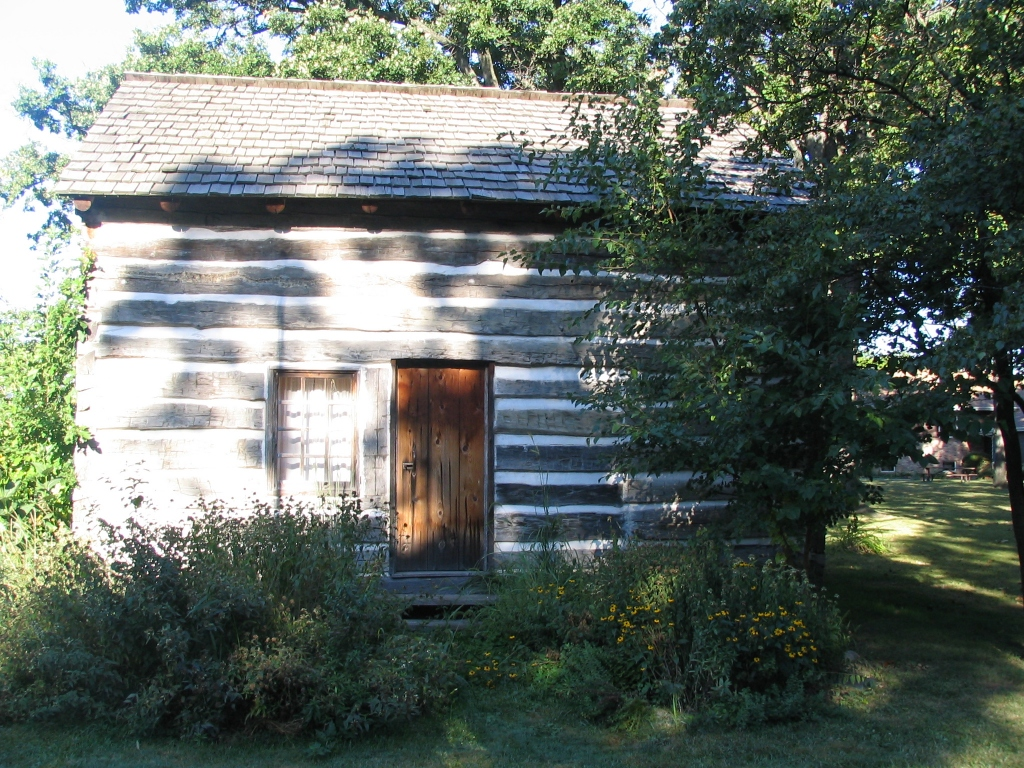
Caspar Ott Cabin, 1837

Located in front of Kipling Elementary School is the Deerfield Historic Village, founded and maintained by the Deerfield Area Historical Society, this outdoor museum consists of five historic buildings and includes the headquarters for the Deerfield Historical Society. Tours are offered during the summer months.

The Historic Village includes the Caspar Ott House, where the Ott family assisted in the passage of slaves in the Underground Railroad, considered to be the oldest building in Lake County, built in 1837. It was restored by Bob Przewlocki. The George Luther House (1847) now includes the Society's offices and Visitor Center. The Bartle Sacker Farmhouse (1854) is a typical 19th century home. While those buildings are all original (although relocated from their original sites), the carriage house and little red school house are replicas. Each year, all fourth graders in Deerfield School District 109 spend a day learning in the school house.

== Geography ==
According to the 2021 census gazetteer files, Deerfield has a total area of 5.55 square miles (14.37 km^{2}), of which 5.53 square miles (14.32 km^{2}) (or 99.60%) is land and 0.02 square miles (0.05 km^{2}) (or 0.40%) is water.

=== Climate ===
Due to its proximity to the city, Deerfield's climate shares many of the same traits as Chicago. Deerfield lies in a humid continental climate zone (Köppen: Dfa) and experiences four distinct seasons. Like all Chicago suburbs, Deerfield lies within USDA plant hardiness zone 5b.

== Demographics ==
Historical population
Census	Pop.	Note	%±
1910	476		—
1920	610		28.2%
1930	1,852		203.6%
1940	2,283		23.3%
1950	3,288		44.0%
1960	11,786		258.5%
1970	18,876		60.2%
1980	17,432		−7.6%
1990	17,327		−0.6%
2000	18,420		6.3%
2010	18,225		−1.1%
2020	19,196		5.3%
U.S. Decennial Census; 2010 2020

=== Racial and ethnic composition ===
Deerfield village, Illinois – racial and ethnic composition Note: the US Census treats Hispanic/Latino as an ethnic category. This table excludes Latinos from the racial categories and assigns them to a separate category. Hispanics/Latinos may be of any race.
Race / ethnicity (NH = Non-Hispanic)	Pop. 2000	Pop. 2010	Pop. 2020	% 2000	% 2010	% 2020
White alone (NH)	17,434	16,797	16,649	94.65%	92.00%	86.73%
Black or African American alone (NH)	58	93	131	0.31%	0.51%	0.68%
Native American or Alaska Native alone (NH)	7	4	7	0.04%	0.02%	0.04%
Asian alone (NH)	465	660	1,015	2.52%	3.62%	5.29%
Native Hawaiian or Pacific Islander alone (NH)	3	2	1	0.02%	0.01%	0.01%
Other race alone (NH)	21	25	47	0.11%	0.14%	0.24%
Mixed race or multiracial (NH)	120	164	552	0.65%	0.90%	2.88%
Hispanic or Latino (any race)	312	510	794	1.69%	2.80%	4.14%
Total	18,420	18,225	19,196	100.00%	100.00%	100.00%

=== 2020 census ===
As of the 2020 census, Deerfield had a population of 19,196. The median age was 43.2 years. 25.8% of residents were under the age of 18 and 17.6% were 65 years of age or older. For every 100 females, there were 93.5 males, and for every 100 females age 18 and over there were 90.2 males.

100.0% of residents lived in urban areas, while 0.0% lived in rural areas.

There were 7,100 households in Deerfield, of which 37.1% had children under the age of 18 living in them. Of all households, 66.9% were married-couple households, 9.9% were households with a male householder and no spouse or partner present, and 21.0% were households with a female householder and no spouse or partner present. About 21.5% of all households were made up of individuals, and 12.4% had someone living alone who was 65 years of age or older.

There were 7,436 housing units, of which 4.5% were vacant. The homeowner vacancy rate was 1.4% and the rental vacancy rate was 6.0%.

=== Demographic estimates ===
In Census Bureau profile data, Deerfield had 5,574 families. The population density was 3,457.49 inhabitants per square mile (1,334.94/km^{2}), and housing unit density was 1,339.34 per square mile (517.12/km^{2}). The average household size was 3.02 and the average family size was 2.59.

=== Income and poverty ===
The median income for a household in the village was $162,064, and the median income for a family was $189,125. Males had a median income of $117,305 versus $58,258 for females. The per capita income for the village was $82,426. About 1.2% of families and 2.7% of the population were below the poverty line, including 1.6% of those under age 18 and 3.5% of those age 65 or over.

== Economy ==
In 1982 a 324-acre (131 ha) tax increment financing district opened along Lake-Cook Road, spurring business development. As of 1987 the office leasing activity in Deerfield increased tremendously, and throughout the 1980s office buildings were developed along Lake-Cook Road, between Interstate 294 and Waukegan Road. Two hotels, an Embassy Suites and a Hyatt, opened during the era to accommodate the increased business traffic. Factors augmenting the establishment of businesses along the corridor included the opening of the district, the abundance of vacant land, and the corridor's proximity to the Chicago Loop and O'Hare International Airport.

=== Corporate headquarters ===
Deerfield is home to the headquarters of Baxter Healthcare, Beam, Big Apple Bagels, CF Industries, Fortune Brands Home & Security, Essendant, and Walgreens Boots Alliance. As of 2021, Walgreens Boots Alliance employed 6,500 employees at its headquarters, along with 2,500 Walgreens employees, making it the largest employer in Deerfield.

Deerfield is the former home to the headquarters of Consumers Digest, Così, the U.S. subsidiaries of Takeda Pharmaceutical Company, Mondelez International, Caterpillar, and the bakery division headquarters of the Sara Lee Corporation. In 1987 Sara Lee had about 1,200 employees in Deerfield. In 1990, the Deerfield Sara Lee plant and bakery headquarters was closed, and the land was sold to developers. In 1985, President Ronald Reagan visited the Sara Lee factory in Deerfield.

=== Top employers ===
As of 2023, the top employers in the city are:

#	Employer	# of employees
1	Walgreens	5,000
2	Baxter International	1,900
3	Amgen	635
4	Essendant	600
5	Deerfield Park District	500
6	Illinois Student Assistance Commission	499
7	Lundbeck	260
8	Mercer Human Resources	250
9	Whitehall of Deerfield	230
10	ICON PLC	160

=== Shopping districts ===
In 1998, a significant portion of downtown Deerfield was demolished and replaced with a new outdoor shopping district called Deerfield Square. It is composed of a variety of retailers and restaurants. In addition to merchandising space, Deerfield Square includes office space and an outdoor plaza which is used during the summer for free outdoor concerts.

Deerbrook Mall is a shopping district located along the Deerfield-Northbrook border. When it originally opened in 1971, it included both indoor and outdoor shopping areas. The inside shopping area and some exterior buildings were demolished in 2017.

Near Deerbrook Mall is Caldwell Corners, a small outdoor mall that carries the village's original name. Deerfield Public Library was a temporary tenant of this mall in 2012 and 2013 while the main location was being renovated.

== Government ==
Presidential election results

Presidential election results in Deerfield
Year	Democratic	Republican	Others
2020	78.8% 9,540	19.8% 2,391	1.4% 170
2016	74.7% 8,302	18.5% 2,059	6.8% 754

The village hall is called the Bernard Forrest Deerfield Village Hall.

The United States Postal Service operates the Deerfield Post Office.

Deerfield is represented by the 10th Congressional District of Illinois (Democrat Brad Schneider), 29th District of the Illinois Senate (Democrat Julie Morrison) and the 58th District of the Illinois House of Representatives (Democrat Bob Morgan).

== Education ==
=== Public schools ===
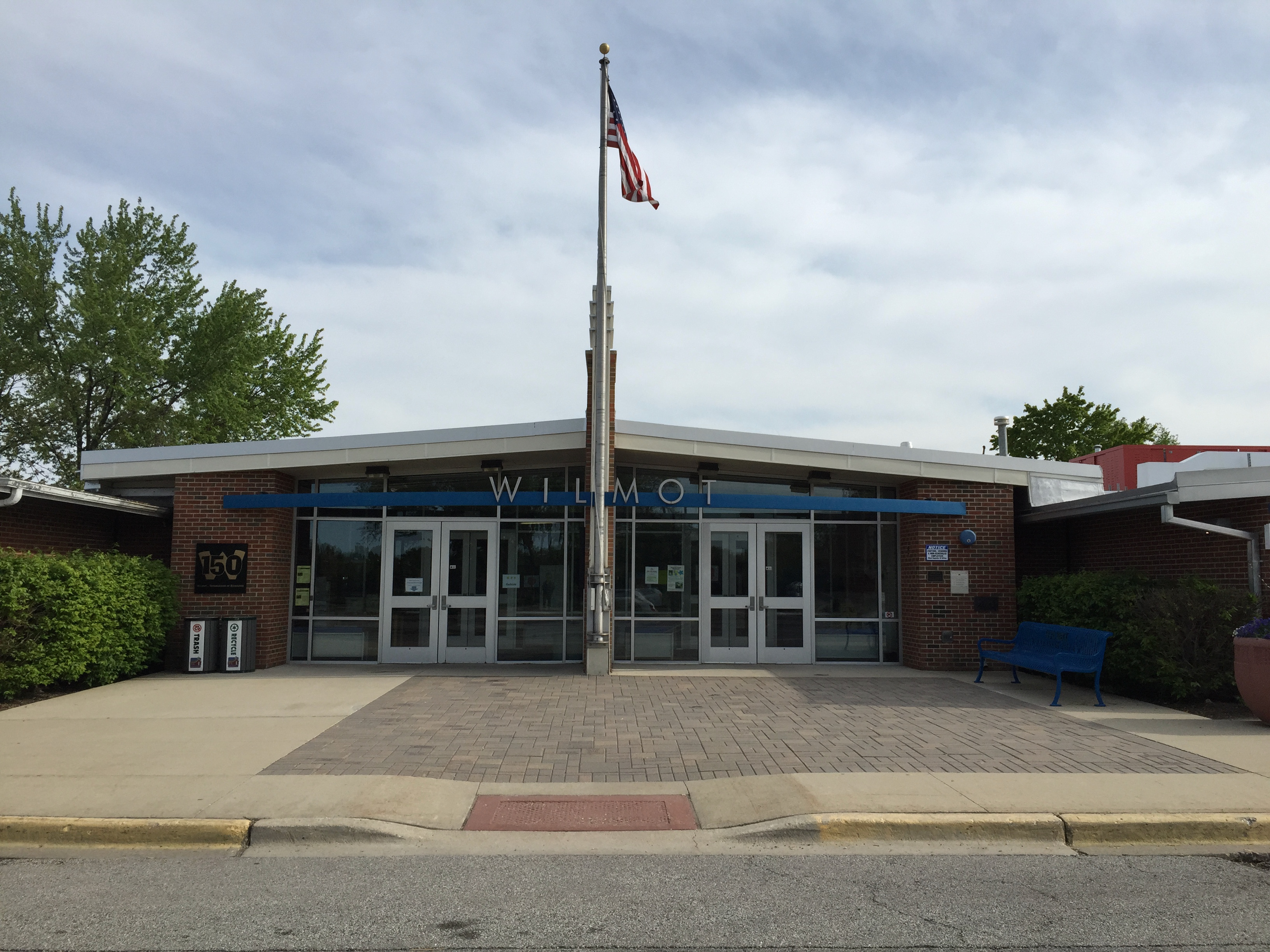
Wilmot Elementary School, one of four elementary schools in Deerfield School District 109

Deerfield is served by Deerfield School District 109, which operates four public elementary schools (Kipling, South Park, Walden, and Wilmot) and two public middle schools (Caruso and Shepard). The majority of Deerfield's children go on to attend Deerfield High School; however, a small portion attend Highland Park High School (both of which comprise Township High School District 113). Deerfield High School has consistently been ranked as a top school in the state.

At one time, District 109 contained as many as eight elementary schools. However, Maplewood, Woodland Park, Briarwood, and Cadwell were all closed beginning in the 1970s through the 1980s and their students absorbed by the four larger, remaining elementary schools. A small part of the far southwestern side of the village is in Aptakisic-Tripp Community Consolidated School District 102 and Stevenson High School's area, with some students living in that area.

The superintendent of District 109 is currently Mike Simeck, and the superintendent of District 113 is Dr. Bruce Law.

=== Private schools ===
The village is the home to a Conservative Jewish school, Rochelle Zell Jewish High School, and a few Montessori schools. Holy Cross School, a Catholic elementary and middle school, used to operate in Deerfield but closed at the conclusion of the 2017–2018 school year.

=== Colleges and universities ===
Trinity International University and Trinity Evangelical Divinity School were formerly located in Deerfield. The school moved to a fully online model in 2023, and closed their Deerfield residential campus.

== Infrastructure ==
=== Transportation ===
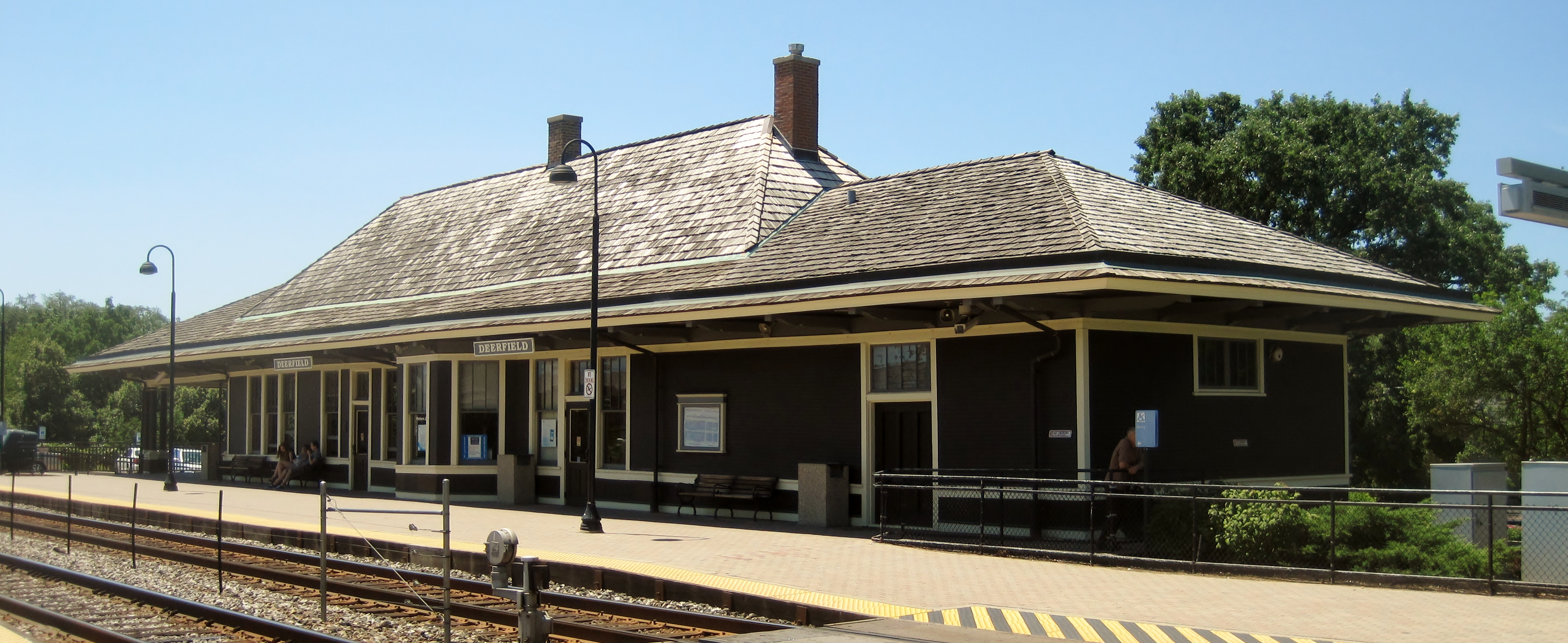
The Metra train station in Deerfield

Deerfield has two Metra stations connecting it to Chicago Union Station, Deerfield and Lake Cook Road, both on the Milwaukee District North Line. Several Pace buses, routes 627, 631, 632, 633, 634, and 635, connect the Lake Cook Road station to corporate offices in the area during rush hour periods. Deerfield is also served by Pace Bus route 471. Three Amtrak services, the Empire Builder, the Borealis, and the Hiawatha, pass through but do not stop in Deerfield.

Deerfield is connected to several arterial roadways and interstate highways, including Deerfield Road, Lake-Cook Road, Illinois Route 43, I-94 and I-294.

O'Hare International Airport is the nearest airport to Deerfield.

Deerfield has several bike trails, including some that connect to neighboring communities, Lake Michigan, the Chicago Botanic Garden and the Des Plaines River Trail.

In the 1990s, Deerfield was one of six communities that competed to receive a prototype personal rapid transit system that the Northern Illinois Transit Authority was planning to build. A proposal by Rosemont was instead selected, and such a system was ultimately never built.

=== Utilities ===
The village purchases its water in bulk from Highland Park to distribute to residents and businesses. Deerfield operates its own sewage treatment plant on Hackberry Lane, with the outflow entering the a branch of the Chicago River. A new wastewater treatment plant was completed in 2013 on the site of the existing plant. An emergency water line connects Deerfield to Northbrook in the event that either town loses its water service. Lakeshore Recycling provides solid waste, recycling, and composting services within Deerfield.

Deerfield is a part of the CS^{2} Residential Community Solar Program, which lets residents purchase solar energy credits via subscription and apply them towards their electric bill. North Shore Gas provides natural gas to Deerfield businesses and residents.

== Notable people ==
- Paul Adams, Deerfield High School football coach from 1966 to 1992
- Alexander 23, singer, songwriter and record producer, originally from Deerfield
- Robert Bell, Chicago's Bozo the Clown, resided in Deerfield as an adult
- Dean Bernardini, rock musician for band Chevelle, attended Deerfield High School
- Karl Berning, Illinois state senator, resided in and represented Deerfield
- Alex Borstein, actor and voice actor, known for voicing Lois Griffin on Family Guy, raised in Deerfield
- Brian Bram, artist for American Splendor, attended Deerfield High School
- Colt Cabana, professional wrestler, raised in Deerfield
- Joey Calistri, soccer player, attended Deerfield High School
- Duje Dukan, professional basketball player, attended Deerfield High School
- Cory Everson, fitness model and bodybuilder, attended Deerfield High School
- Brenda A. Ferber, children's book author, resides in Deerfield
- Tim Floyd, former coach for the Chicago Bulls, resided in Deerfield
- T. C. Furlong, guitarist, co-founder of the Jump 'N the Saddle Band, and producer of "The Curly Shuffle"
- Gale Gand, pastry chef, Food Network personality, cookbook author, winner of 2001 James Beard award
- Ross Golan, multi-platinum songwriter, producer, artist, grew up in Deerfield
- Charlie Jones, receiver for the NFL's Cincinnati Bengals, resided in Deerfield and attended Deerfield High School
- Paul Juda, Part of the bronze medal-winning gymnastics team at the 2024 Paris Olympics, Bronze medal winning team at 2023 World Artistic Gymnastics Championships, two-time silver medalist at 2021 Pan American Gymnastics Championships, 9 NCAA men's gymnastics championships (six individual and three team), and 6 Big Ten titles (two individual and four team)
- Pete Jones, first winner of HBO's Project Greenlight, writer/director of Stolen Summer
- Bryan Jurewicz, lineman for Wisconsin Badgers, grew up in Deerfield
- Elfrieda Knaak, schoolteacher in Deerfield and Waukegan, famous for the mysterious circumstances of her death
- Lindsay Knapp, offensive lineman for Green Bay Packers, played in Super Bowl XXXI
- Kevin McCollum, actor and Broadway producer, went to Deerfield High School
- Aaron Moorehead, receiver for NFL's Indianapolis Colts
- CM Punk, professional wrestler, lived in Deerfield during his childhood.
- Bruce Rauner, 42nd governor of Illinois (2015–2019)
- The Redwalls, a four-piece rock band
- Betty Lou Reed, Illinois state representative
- Ellie Reed, actress, raised in Deerfield
- Todd Reirden, NHL coach and former player
- Brad Schneider, US representative, lives in Deerfield
- Art Shay, prolific photojournalist, lived in Deerfield for 50 years
- Curt Teich, 20th-century postcard photographer and manufacturer
- Fred L. Turner, retired chairman and CEO of McDonald's Corp
- T. J. Tynan, professional hockey player, Deerfield native
- Daniel Walker, 36th governor of Illinois (1973–1977)
- Edwin F. Weigle, photographer for Chicago Tribune during World War I, lived and died in Deerfield

== Popular culture ==
National Boss's Day was invented by a Deerfield employee.

In 1979, Deerfield created a "No-Kissing Zone" at the local train station in response to complaints about traffic jams at the station caused by couples taking too long to kiss their goodbyes at the drop-off point. The "No-Kissing" signs (patterned after international traffic signs) attracted national attention and were featured in Time magazine and ABC's AM America (precursor to Good Morning America). A Deerfield family appearing on the game show Family Feud presented Richard Dawson, famous for kissing contestants on the show, with replica pins of the signs.

In the 1980s, Deerfield and other North Shore communities inspired the teen films of director/screenwriter John Hughes. The fictional Shermer, Illinois, included elements of Deerfield and neighboring Northbrook and Highland Park.

A number of media properties have been set and/or filmed in Deerfield, including television drama Once and Again, comedy Married... with Children and portions of reality show American High. In film, the Deerfield train station is shown in the film Risky Business, and Stolen Summer used various parts of the village.

The village was identified as the hometown of Kitty Pryde in the X-Men comics.

Deerfield also figures in the musical Dear Edwina, written by Marcy Heisler, a Deerfield native, and Zina Goldrich. The fictional protagonist lives on Birchwood Avenue. Although the play is set in Paw Paw, Michigan, much of it (including the address) is inspired by Heisler's hometown, Deerfield.

In 2010, the History Channel's documentary The Crumbling of America mentioned Deerfield in a discussion of frequent blackouts that residents experienced over 2000 times from 2000 to 2009.
