= Dunham Jones Crain =

American politician

Dunham Jones Crain (February 28, 1831 – May 17, 1908) was an American politician and diplomat from New York.

== Biography ==
He was born on February 28, 1831, in Cullen, Herkimer County, New York, the son of Assemblyman William C. Crain (1798–1865) and Perses Narina (Tunnicliff) Crain. He graduated from Union College. Then he studied law at Cooperstown, was admitted to the bar, and practiced with the firm of Barney & Butler in New York City. Later he became a partner in the firm of Stewart, Stallknecht & Crain.

He was a Democratic member of the New York State Assembly (NYC 14th D.) in 1858. In 1859, he married Hannah Ann Crocker (died 1914), and their children were New York D.A. Thomas C. T. Crain, Christobelle Crain and Davida Crocker Crain. In 1877, he was appointed by President Rutherford B. Hayes as U.S. Consul in Milan and served until 1884.

He died on May 17, 1908, in New York City.

New York State Assembly
Preceded by Robert B. Bradford	New York State Assembly; New York County, 14th District; 1858	Succeeded by George Opdyke
