= Deerfield School District 109 =

School district in Illinois, United States

Deerfield Public Schools District 109

Address
- 517 Deerfield Road Deerfield, Lake County, Illinois, 60015; United States

District information
- Motto: Engage. Inspire. Empower.
- Grades: K–8
- Superintendent: Michael Simeck
- Schools: 6
- NCES District ID: 1711980

Students and staff
- Students: 2,7156 (2023–2024)
- Teachers: 263.40

Other information
- Website: dps109.org

Deerfield Public Schools 109 is a school district in Deerfield, Illinois. It is responsible for 2,889 students taught by 295 teachers with an average class size of 20. The district consists of; Kipling Elementary School, South Park Elementary School, Walden Elementary School, Wilmot Elementary School, Caruso Middle School, Shepard Middle School, and Helping Hands Preschool. The district administration office is located on the site of Kipling Elementary School, at 517 Deerfield Road Deerfield, IL 60015.

As of the academic year 2020/21, the district had a budget of $56,111,793 which equated to an average annual spending of $18,794 (1.45% increase from the following year). 69% of the district's teachers have master's degrees and above, and 31% of the district's teachers have a bachelor's degree.

== History ==
The district can trace its origins back to the 1840s when the first schools opened in Deerfield. The district was organized in 1860, and was composed of one wooden schoolhouse.

In 1913, the district's wooden schoolhouse burnt down. A referendum was held the same year to build a new school, which was ultimately built on the site of the current district administration building.

In 1978, the district consolidated with School District 110, which covered western Deerfield and all of Riverwoods.

== Governance ==
The district has a seven-member board of education. Mike Simeck is the current Superintendent of the district.

== Schools ==
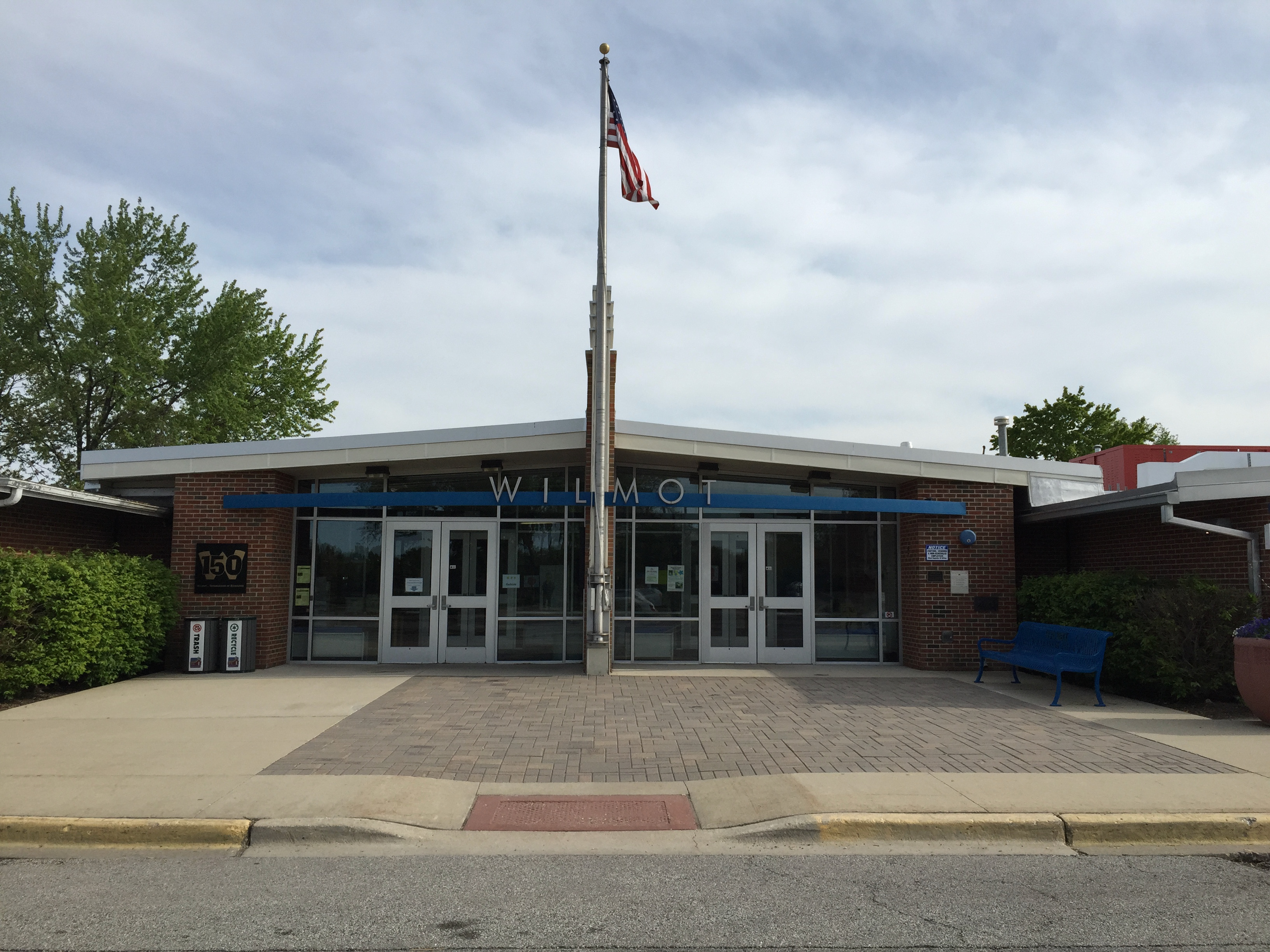
Wilmot Elementary School

The district is composed of 4 elementary schools and 2 middle schools:

- Caruso Middle School
- Kipling Elementary School
- Shepard Middle School
- South Park Elementary School
- Walden Elementary School
- Wilmot Elementary School
