= Edwin F. Weigle =

American war photographer and film cameraman

Edwin Frederick Weigle
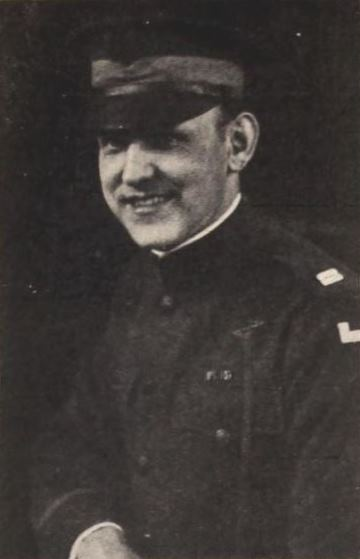
- Weigle in 1921
- Born: March 13, 1889; Chicago, Illinois
- Died: August 1, 1973 (aged 84); Deerfield, Illinois
- Occupation: photographer/cinematographer

Signature
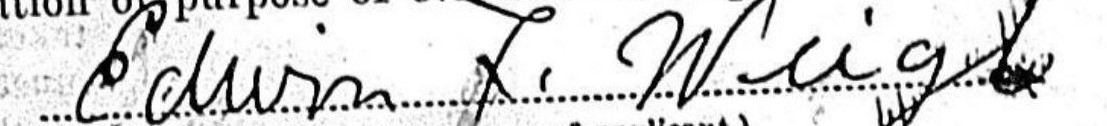

Edwin Frederick Weigle (March 13, 1889 – August 1, 1973) was a cameraman for the Chicago Tribune, cinematographer and documentary film maker.

== Biography ==
Weigle was born in Chicago, Illinois on March 13, 1889. His parents Adolph and Sophie came from Germany and emigrated to the United States in 1879.

Weigle worked for the Chicago Tribune from 1909 and achieved prominence as a film correspondent during the First World War. Shortly after the outbreak of the war, Weigle covered the resistance of the Belgian army against the German invaders. Weigle obtained permission from the Belgian government to photograph actual battle scenes for the first time. The result was On Belgian Battlefields, one of the first war documentaries shown in the United States. In 1915 and 1916, the Chicago Tribune again sent Weigle to Europe where he shot film on the Western and Eastern Front for The German Side of the War.

After the American entry in the war, Weigle joined the U.S. Signal Corps, and filmed with the 35th Division in France during the Meuse-Argonne Offensive.

Edwin Weigle retired as a film correspondent shortly after the war and died in Deerfield, Illinois, on August 1, 1973.

== Film work ==
Segments from Weigle's war footage have been identified and located by authors Cooper C. Graham and Ron van Dopperen while researching their book American Cinematographers in the Great War, 1914-1918. A short scene showing the burning city of Alost from Weigle's film On Belgian Battlefields (USA, 1914) was located by the authors in the collection of the Belgian film archives. At the Library of Congress numerous segments were found from Weigle's film The German Side of the War (USA, 1915/1916). Scenes taken by Weigle in June 1918 at an artillery school in Fort Sill, Oklahoma, were retrieved by the authors in the collection of the National Archives. The authors also found this World War I Western Front footage at the Imperial War Museum, shot by Weigle with the 35th Division in France shortly after the battle of Meuse-Argonne in October 1918.

Edwin Weigle Filming the German Side Of The War (1915)

Weigle with the German army, from Chicago Tribune 23 July 1916

In 2017, Weigle's original combat camera - a Bell & Howell 2709 - that he cranked while filming with the 35th Division, A.E.F, at the Western Front was discovered by the authors in the historical collection of a movie prop house.

Weigle's film work during World War I featured in the documentary Mobilizing Movies! The U.S. Signal Corps Goes to War, 1917-1919.

Documentary on the official American film cameramen in World War I

== Sources ==
- Graham, Cooper C.; van Dopperen, Ron (2010). "Edwin F. Weigle: Cameraman for the Chicago Tribune". Film History. 22 (4): 389–407. doi:10.2979/filmhistory.2010.22.4.389. S2CID 194061504. {{Project MUSE|411651}}.
- Castellan, James W.; van Dopperen, Ron; Graham, Cooper C. (2016). American Cinematographers in the Great War, 1914-1918. Indiana University Press. ISBN 978-0-86196-717-9. JSTOR j.ctt1bmzn8c.
- Book review "American Cinematographers in the Great War, 1914-1914" Historical Journal of Film, Radio & Television (2016)
- Ron van Dopperen and Cooper C. Graham, The Growth of Official Military Cinema in the United States, 1917-1919 (2017)
- Weblog on the American Films and Cinematographers of World War I, 2013-2018
- Ron van Dopperen, "Shooting the Siege of Antwerp", World War One Illustrated, (Spring 2024), 23-29
- Joseph M. Patterson, "While Weigle Took Moving Pictures", Chicago Tribune (1 November 1914), section VII,. page 16
- Edwin F. Weigle at IMDb
- Edwin F. Weigle, My Experiences on the Belgian Battlefields (First Edition, Chicago 1914) PDF
- Edwin F. Weigle, On Four Battle-Fronts with the German Army (Chicago 1915) PDF
- Theater Program "German Side of the War" - Story of the Films and their Taking (USA, 1915)
- "The German Side of the War" (USA, 1915) - film scenes taken by Edwin Weigle, from the Library of Congress
- "Mobilizing Movies! The U.S. Signal Corps Goes To War, 1917-1919" (documentary, 4K improved video edit, 2026)
- The 35th Division, A.E.F, after the Battle of Meuse-Argonne, filmed by Edwin F. Weigle on October 18, 1918 (Reconstructed 2017)
- "Photographic Activities U.S. Signal Corps During World War I" (reconstruction, 4K improved video edit, 2026)
- American Cameramen in World War I - video reconstruction with Signal Corps pictures (2026)
- Movie Trailer "American Cinematographers in the Great War, 1914-1918"
