= Karl Berning =

American politician, actor, and writer (1911-2005)

Member of the Illinois Senate from the 32nd district
- In office 1967 – 1983
- Preceded by: Clifford B. Latherow
- Succeeded by: Jack Schaffer

Lake County Treasurer
- In office 1962 – 1966

West Deerfield Township Supervisor
- In office 1953 – 1962

West Deerfield Township Constable
- In office 1946 – 1953

Personal details
- Born: Karl Ives Berning; June 10, 1911 Seattle, Washington, US
- Died: September 26, 2005 (aged 94) Naples, Florida, US
- Party: Republican
- Spouse: Alpha Nina Mikkelsen
- Education: Blackburn College

Karl Ives Berning (June 10, 1911 – September 26, 2005) was an American politician, actor, and writer.

== Biography ==
Berning's grave at Deerfield Cemetery

Born in Seattle, Berning graduated from Kirkland High School in Kirkland, Washington. He received his college degree from Blackburn College and studied business administration at Lake Forest College, Northwestern University, and University of Illinois at Chicago. Berning lived with his wife and family in Deerfield, Illinois. He wrote a book: The Life and Times of Karl Berning, The Early Years, and was involved with community theatre. Berning as West Deerfield Township supervisor and as township constable. He also served on the Lake County, Illinois Board of Commissioners and was chairman of the county board. Berning served as county treasurer for Lake County and was a Republican. He served in the Illinois Senate from 1967 to 1983. In 1983, Berning and his wife moved to Fort Myers, Florida. He continued to be involved with the Republican Party while living in Florida. Berning died in Naples, Florida on September 26, 2005, and was buried at Deerfield Cemetery.
