= Betty Lou Reed =

American politician

Betty Lou Reed (March 23, 1927 – July 11, 2011) was an American politician.

Reed was born in Flint, Michigan and lived in Deerfield, Illinois for most of her life. She served on the Lake County, Illinois Board of Supervisors from 1968 to 1972. Reed was involved with the Republican Party. Reed served in the Illinois House of Representatives from 1975 to 1983. She died in Aurora, Colorado.
