= Rochelle Zell Jewish High School =

- תיכון רושל זל
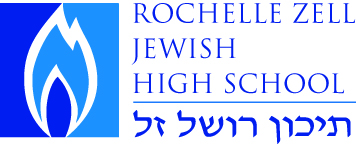

Location
- 1095 Lake Cook Road; Deerfield, Lake, Illinois 60015; United States
- 42.151°N 87.854°W

Information
- Former name: Chicagoland Jewish High School
- Type: Private
- Religious affiliation: Judaism
- Denomination: Conservative
- Established: 2001; 25 years ago
- Head of school: Tony Frank
- Grades: 9-12
- Gender: Co-educational
- Average class size: 15
- Student to teacher ratio: 5:1
- Language: English, Hebrew, and Spanish
- Schedule type: Rotating Schedule
- Hours in school day: 7
- Campus type: Suburban
- Colors: Blue and white
- Athletics conference: Chicago Prep Conference
- Mascot: Tiger
- Nickname: RZ
- Accreditation: ISACS
- Test average: 93% of AP tests taken were scores of 3 or higher in 2025
- Newspaper: The Stripe
- Yearbook: The Roar
- Tuition: $35,900
- Feeder schools: Solomon Schechter Day School, Chicago Jewish Day School, Akiba-Schechter Jewish Day School, Hillel Torah, Day School, Bernard Zell Anshe Emet Day School, non-Jewish private schools, and public schools all around the Chicagoland area
- Affiliation: Prizmah LMAIS
- Website: www.rzjhs.org

Rochelle Zell Jewish High School (RZJHS), formerly Chicagoland Jewish High School (CJHS), (Rochelle Zell, Hebrew: תיכון רושל זל), located 25 miles northwest of downtown Chicago, is a private, full-day, co-educational high school for primarily Jewish students from grades nine to twelve. Rochelle Zell first opened its doors in 2001 to 26 students.

== History ==
Rochelle Zell Jewish High School opened in 2001 as Chicagoland Jewish High School, with 26 students: 23 freshmen and 3 sophomores. In the 2005–2006 school year, 94 students attended Rochelle Zell, and the number increased to 132 students in the 2007–2008 school year, along with many new faculty members. Due to growth in its student body, Rochelle Zell moved from its Morton Grove campus to a high school in Deerfield in Fall 2007.

In 2015, the school received a donation from the Zell Family Foundation and subsequently changed its name to Rochelle Zell Jewish High School.

For the 2025–2026 school year, enrollment was nearly 140 students drawn from over 25 communities throughout Chicago and its suburbs. Roughly three-quarters of current students advance to Rochelle Zell from Jewish day schools. The remaining students attend local public and private schools before transferring to Rochelle Zell. The Rochelle Zell student body includes students from all streams of Judaism.

== Curriculum ==
Rochelle Zell Jewish High School offers a dual curriculum of general studies and Jewish studies. Required courses over the four years include English, Hebrew, Jewish Studies, Mathematics, Science, and Social Science. Students also have an option to take Spanish as an additional language, and they choose from a variety of Arts & Electives courses including Computer Science, Model United Nations, Newspaper, and Studio Art. Each year 13-15 Advanced Placement courses are offered to juniors and seniors across the curriculum.

Rochelle Zell is affiliated with Prizmah and the Lake Michigan Association of Independent Schools, and accredited by ISACS.

== Athletics and Activities ==
Rochelle Zell is a member of the Chicago Prep Conference (CPC) of the Illinois High School Association (IHSA) and offers 14 sports, such as baseball, boys and girls basketball, boys and girls cross country, golf, boys and girls soccer, boys and girls tennis, boys and girls track & field, and boys and girls volleyball.

In addition to the athletics program, RZJHS offers over 20 clubs led by student leaders.
