= The German Side of the War =

1915 film by Edwin F. Weigle and Joseph Patterson

The German Side of the War is a 1915 American film. It was one of the first American news films to show World War I from the German perspective, compiled of newsreels released by the Chicago Tribune. The film makers, Edwin F. Weigle and Joseph Patterson, gained permission from military authorities to film after the city of Antwerp fell to the Germans. They also filmed the material from the Tribune's With the Russians at the Front on the same voyage, crossing into Germany to focus more on the Eastern Front. The film premiered in New York City at the 44th Street theater in September 1915.

Thompson described the film:

"If you had been with me in Germany and had seen the German soldiery, the wonderful discipline, the endless preparation ... you would have said: 'The whole world can't whip them.' But then, if you had been on the other side with me and could have seen the bravery of the English, the enthusiasm of the French, the courage of the Belgians and the great organization of the allies you would have said again: 'They can't be whipped.'"

Various segments from The German Side of the War have been found by authors Ron van Dopperen and Cooper C. Graham while researching their book American Cinematographers in the Great War, 1914-1918.

== Reception ==
After the film opened in New York City it generated such interest that the line extended for several blocks and would-be moviegoers were forced to buy their tickets from scalpers.
