= Big Apple Bagels =

American franchised chain

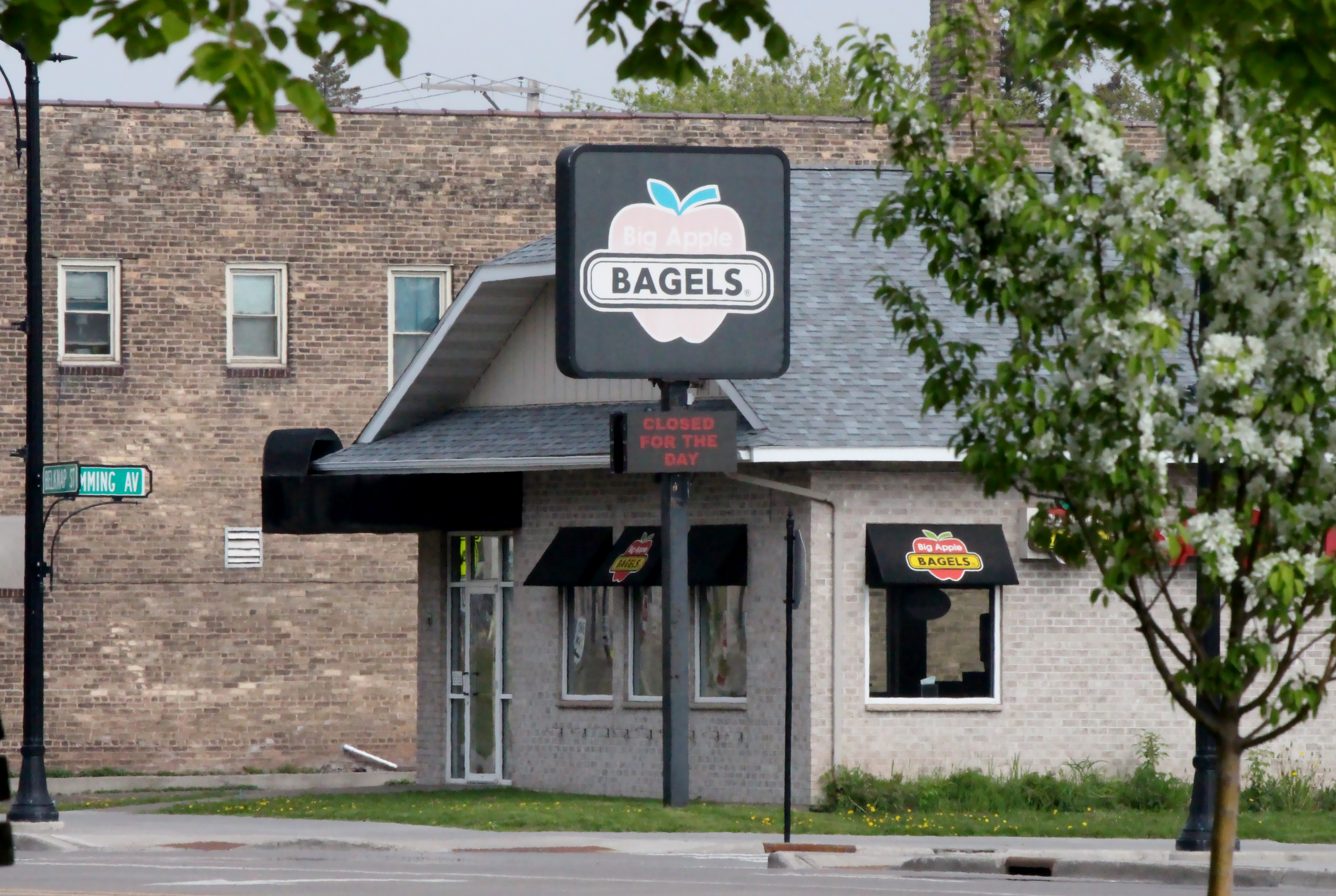
- Big Apple Bagels location in Superior, Wisconsin.
- Type: Public (OTCQB: BABB)
- Industry: Fast-casual restaurant Franchising
- Founded: 1993; 33 years ago
- Headquarters: Deerfield, Illinois, U.S.
- Revenue: ▲US$3,545,142 (2024)
- Net income: ▲US$525,200 (2024)
- Parent: BAB, Inc.
- Website: www.bigapplebagels.com

Big Apple Bagels is an American franchised chain of bakery-cafes based in Deerfield, Illinois. Coffee, along with a variety of other related products are sold. The products are sold as three different brands: Big Apple Bagels, Brewster's Coffee, and My Favorite Muffin.

== Industry recognition ==
- 2003 Entrepreneur Magazine "Franchise 500"
- 2005 Entrepreneur Magazine "Best of the Best" Top Franchises
- 2010 GI Jobs, "Military Friendly Franchise"
- 2011 Restaurant Business Magazine "Top Future 50" Franchises

== BAB, Inc. ==
BAB, Inc. (OTCQB: BABB), the parent company of Big Apple Bagels, has 76 franchised and 4 licensed stores. Big Apple Bagels was started by Paul Stolzer in 1985. BAB completed its initial public offering November 27, 1995. BAB, Inc. has been a fundraiser of the Cystic Fibrosis Foundations since 2010.

Products available include sandwiches, soup, salads, bakery products, such as muffins and bagels, coffee, smoothies, frozen yogurt and pizza. There is also a line of breakfast sandwiches.

BAB, Inc. was formed to operate and franchise Big Apple Bagels locations. It expanded with a series of acquisitions:

- 1996 – Brewster's Coffee
- 1996 – Strathmore Bagels
- 1996 – Bagels Unlimited Inc.
- 1996 – Danville Bagels, Inc.
- 1997 – My Favorite Muffin
- 1999 – Jacobs Bros. Bagels

In addition to these acquisitions, in 2012 the company developed the SweetDuet Frozen Yogurt & Gourmet Muffin concept. This concept is meant to fuse self-serve frozen yogurt with My Favorite Muffin gourmet muffins.
