= Adna Wright Leonard =

American chaplain

Bishop Adna Wrigh Leonard
- Bishop of the Methodist Episcopal Church
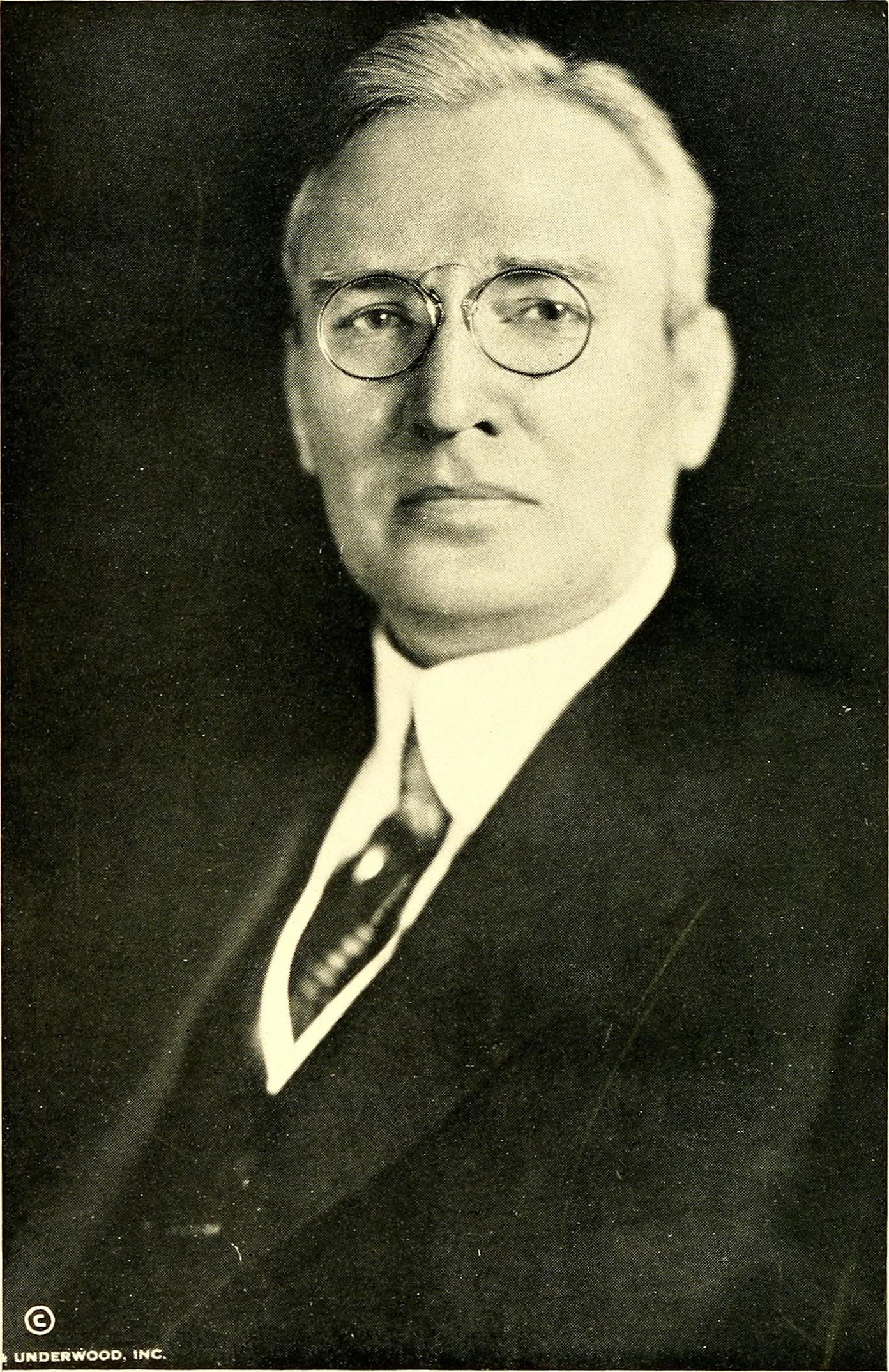
- Church: United Methodist Church
- Diocese: Washington D.C.
- In office: 1916–1943

Orders
- Ordination: 1899

Personal details
- Born: November 2, 1874 Cincinnati, Ohio, US
- Died: May 3, 1943 (aged 68) Fagradalsfjall, Iceland
- Education: New York University; Drew Theological Seminary; The American School of Archeology in Rome

Bishop Adna Wright Leonard I (November 2, 1874 – May 3, 1943) was a Methodist bishop in Buffalo, New York, and the first chairman of the Methodist Commission on Chaplains. He was killed in 1943 in a plane crash on his way to Iceland to visit Methodist chaplains and their troops.

== Biography ==
He was born in Cincinnati, Ohio, on November 2, 1874, to Adna Bradway Leonard (1837–1916) and Caroline (Kaiser) Leonard (1840–1899). He was elected bishop in 1916.

He married Mary Luella Day (1873–1956) on October 9, 1901, and had the following children: Adna Wright Leonard II (1904–1986); and Phyllis Day (Leonard) Budd (1907–2002).

He was elected to the episcopacy of the Methodist Episcopal Church at the 1916 General Conference. He served in San Francisco, Pittsburgh and Washington, D.C.

=== Death ===
Leonard was killed on May 3, 1943, in the crash of the B-24 Liberator Hot Stuff at Fagradalsfjall in Iceland where he was traveling on his way to Iceland to visit Methodist chaplains and their troops. Thirteen other people were killed in the plane crash, including Lieutenant General Frank Maxwell Andrews and Brigadier General Charles H. Barth Jr.

== Career ==
- President of the New York Anti-Saloon League
- Chairman The Methodist Commission on Chaplains
- Headed trustees of the University of Southern California

== See also ==
- List of bishops of the United Methodist Church
