= Edward Swann =

American politician

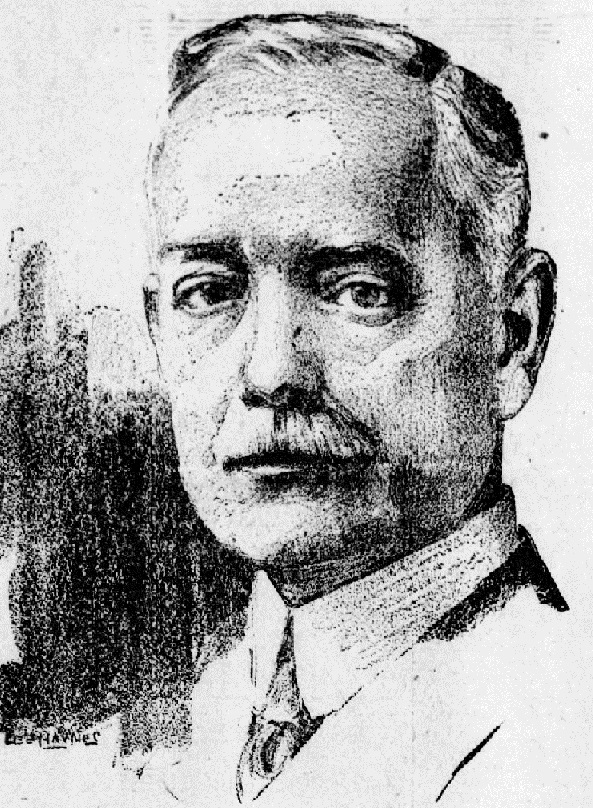
Edward Swann, New York Judge, District Attorney and Congressman

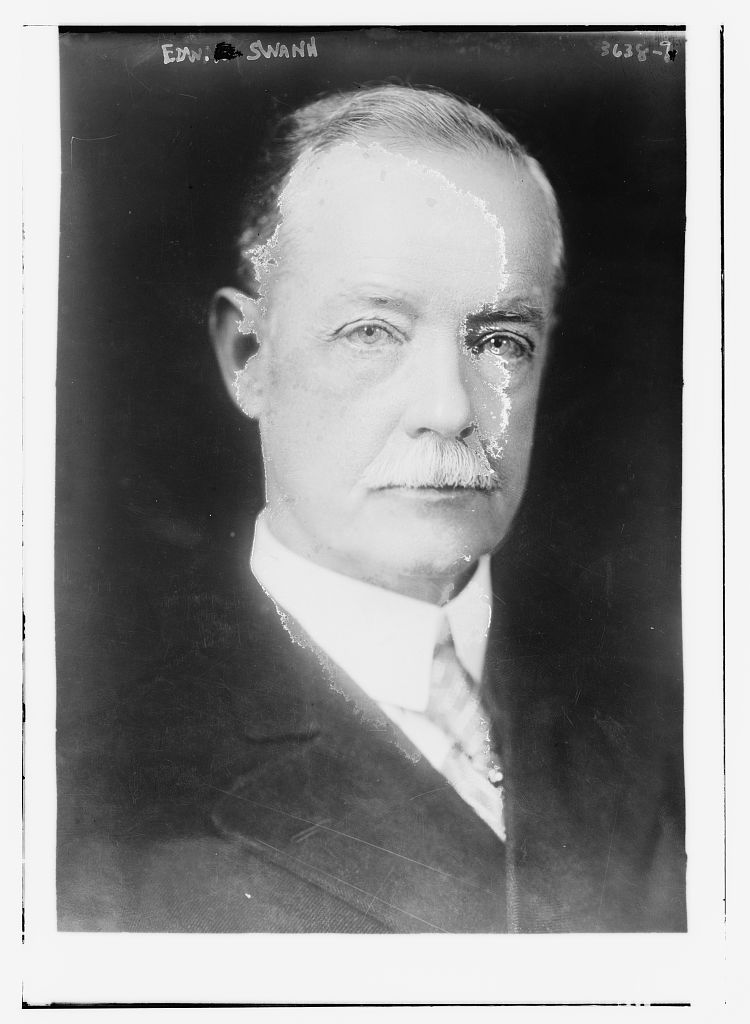
Judge Edward Swann in 1917

Edward Swann (March 10, 1862 – September 19, 1945) was an American lawyer, jurist, and politician from New York. From November 4, 1902, to March 3, 1903, he served part of one term in the U.S. House of Representatives.

== Life ==
He was born on March 10, 1862, in Madison, Florida.

Swann graduated from Columbia Law School in 1886, was admitted to the bar the same year and commenced practice in New York City. He entered politics as a member of Tammany Hall.

=== Congress ===
Swann was elected as a Democrat to the 57th United States Congress to fill the vacancy caused by the death of Amos J. Cummings and served from December 1, 1902, to March 3, 1903.

=== Career after Congress ===
Afterwards he resumed the practice of law in New York City. In November 1904, Swann ran again for Congress, this time in the 13th District, but was defeated by Republican Herbert Parsons.

In November 1907, Swann was elected a judge of the Court of General Sessions, and took office on January 1, 1908. He was New York County District Attorney from 1916 to 1921, elected in a special election in November 1915 defeating the incumbent Charles A. Perkins, and re-elected in November 1917 to a full term. Swann was accused several times by reform organizations of misconduct and malfeasance in office, urging his removal. Since the precedent of 1900, when Asa Bird Gardiner was removed by Gov. Theodore Roosevelt, this had become a constant move in New York City politics, but neither Republican Charles S. Whitman nor Democrat Al Smith saw reason enough to act.

In November 1920, Swann ran for the New York Supreme Court (1st D.), nominated by the Tammany bosses to get rid of him in the D.A.'s office. After his defeat, Tammany insisted in trying to get him appointed to a vacancy in the New York Court of General Sessions, but Governor Al Smith did not yield. However, for most of the year 1921, Swann remained out-of-state, partly in Florida, partly in Missouri, and left the office in the hands of his chief assistant district attorney, Joab H. Banton.

On May 21, 1921, Swann married in Salisbury, Chariton County, Missouri, Margaret W. Geisinger, a great-niece of Commodore David Geisinger.

=== Death ===
He died on September 19, 1945, in Sewall's Point, Florida.

Swann was buried at the St. Peter's Episcopal Cemetery in Fernandina Beach, Nassau County, Florida.

== Sources ==
- United States Congress. "Edward Swann (id: S001090)". Biographical Directory of the United States Congress.
- OLD 10th CONGRESSIONAL DISTRICT CONVENTIONS in NYT on October 4, 1902
- FOUR NEW NAMES ON THE CONGRESS TICKET in NYT on October 4, 1904
- TAMMANY WINS in NYT on November 6, 1907
- JUDGE DELEHANTY ACCUSES SWANN OF FRAUD ON COURT in NYT on December 31, 1916
- CITY CLUB RENEWS ATTACKS ON SWANN in NYT on April 5, 1917
- TAMMANY FINISHES SLATE FOR THIS FALL in NYT on August 17, 1917
- TAMMANY PICKS SWANN FOR BENCH in NYT on August 10, 1920
- TAMMANY WANTS SWANN ON BENCH in NYT on December 24, 1920
- EDWARD SWANN WEDS IN MISSOURI in NYT on May 22, 1921

U.S. House of Representatives
Preceded by Amos J. Cummings	Member of the U.S. House of Representatives from New York's 10th congressional district 1902–1903	Succeeded by William Sulzer
Legal offices
Preceded by Charles A. Perkins	New York County District Attorney; 1916–1921	Succeeded by Joab H. Banton
