= Deerfield Square =

Shopping center in Illinois, United States

Coordinates: 42°9′59″N 87°50′49″W

Deerfield Square is an upscale lifestyle center shopping area located in Deerfield, Illinois. The center was the first of its kind in the area, but now faces more competition. It opened in 2000. Major retailers in the mall include Ann Taylor LOFT, Athleta, Walgreens, and Whole Foods Market.

== History ==
Deerfield Square was redeveloped from the former Deerfield Commons shopping center, originally built in the 1950s. This redevelopment began in 1998. The 17-acre (69,000 m^{2}) development was spearheaded by Northbrook developer Chuck Malk, who owned Deerfield Commons. Construction began in late 1998 and was completed in 2000. Deerfield Square has a 200,000-square-foot (19,000 m^{2}) retail area and a 60,000-square-foot (5,600 m^{2}) office space.
