= Illinois Student Assistance Commission =

Quasi-public scholarship panel in the U.S. state of Illinois

- Formation: 1957; 69 years ago
- Type: Non-profit Organization
- Legal status: Active
- Purpose: Grant Funding for Education
- Website: www.isac.org

The Illinois Student Assistance Commission (ISAC) is a quasi-public, ten-member panel with a permanent staff. It operates several key Illinois programs of higher education and tuition assistance, of which the largest is the Monetary Award Program (MAP) grant program for eligible Illinois college students. It was founded in 1957.

== Organization ==
The ten members of the ISAC Commission are appointed by the Governor of Illinois with the advice and consent of the Illinois Senate. Of the ten appointees, four are representatives of the professional education community, five are non-educator laypersons with an interest in higher education issues, and one member who is a student in Illinois higher education. Of the four educators, one each shall represent state universities in Illinois, private colleges and universities in Illinois, community colleges in Illinois and Illinois public high schools. The ISAC was created by the Illinois Compiled Statutes (110 ILCS 947/15).
