= Thomas C. T. Crain =

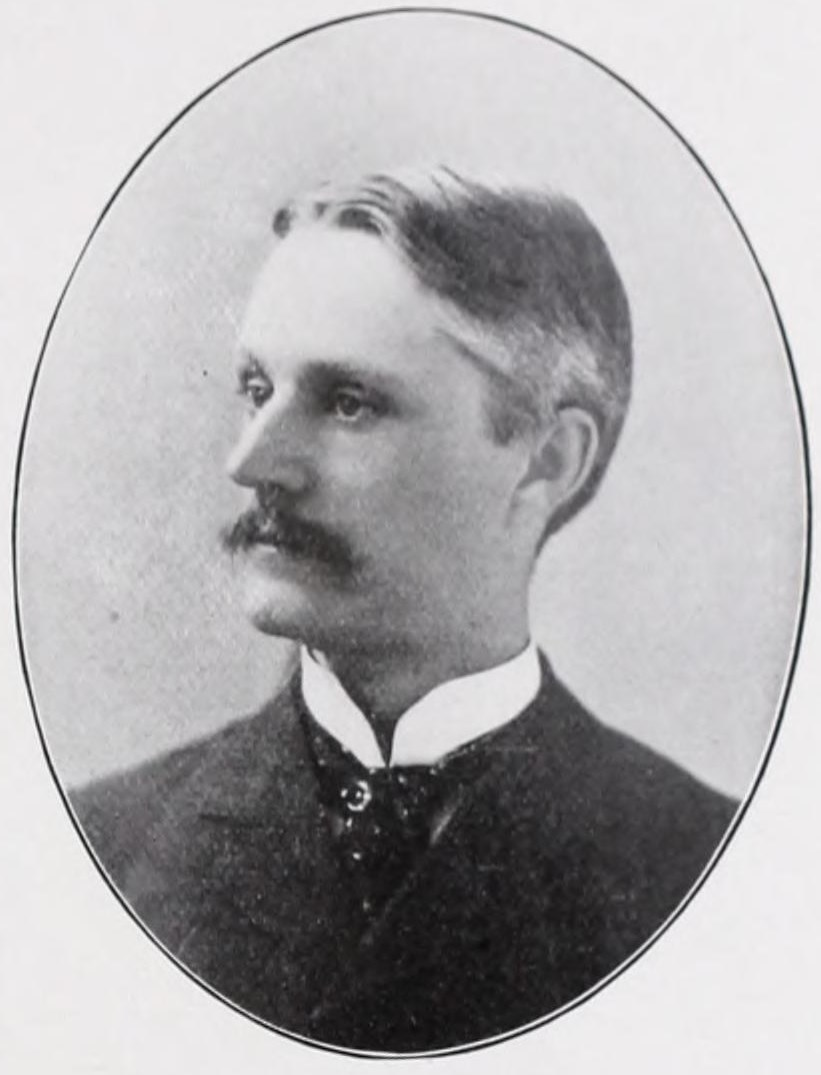

31st New York County District Attorney
- In office January 1, 1930 – December 31, 1933
- Preceded by: Joab H. Banton
- Succeeded by: William C. Dodge

Judge of the New York Supreme Court for the 1st district
- In office January 1924 – January 1, 1930
- Appointed by: Al Smith
- Preceded by: Irving Lehman

New York City Chamberlain
- In office February 1890 – May 1893
- Appointed by: Hugh J. Grant
- Preceded by: Richard Croker
- Succeeded by: Joseph J. O'Donohue

Personal details
- Born: May 25, 1860 New York City, New York, U.S.
- Died: May 29, 1942 (aged 82)
- Party: Democratic
- Parent(s): Dunham Jones Crain

Thomas Crowell Taylor Crain (May 25, 1860 - May 29, 1942) was an American lawyer and politician from New York. He was the New York County District Attorney from 1930 to 1933.

== Biography ==
Crain was born on May 25, 1860, on 14th Street, near the old Tammany Hall in Manhattan. He was the son of Dunham Jones Crain who was appointed U.S. Consul in Milan in 1877. Thomas Crain accompanied his father to Italy but returned in 1881, and began studying law. He was admitted to the bar in New York City in 1884, and commenced practiced with Cockran & Clarke. Later he became a partner in Kenneson, Crain & Allen.

In 1887, he became a member of the Tammany General Committee, representing the 7th Assembly District. In 1889, Mayor Hugh J. Grant appointed him as his private secretary, and in February 1890 as City Chamberlain to succeed Richard Croker who had resigned. He remained in office until May 1893, when Mayor Thomas Francis Gilroy appointed Joseph J. O'Donohue to the office.

He was Tenement House Commissioner from 1904 to 1905 when he resigned following a dispute with Mayor George B. McClellan Jr. in the wake of a fire at 105 Allen Street that killed 18 people, mostly children. Fire officials said windows and fire escapes were blocked. Charges were made that the department had not properly inspected it although Crain said the records showed inspections twice a month.

He was the presiding Judge in the 1911 trial of Triangle Shirtwaist Factory owners Max Blanck and Isaac Harris.

He was a judge of the Court of General Sessions from 1906 to 1924. In 1914, his wife Agnes (Clarke) Crain died. In 1921, he was elected a sachem of the Tammany Society. In January 1924, he was appointed by Governor Al Smith to the New York Supreme Court (1st D.) to fill the vacancy caused by the election of Irving Lehman to the New York Court of Appeals. In November 1924, he was elected to succeed himself.

In November 1929, he was elected New York County District Attorney. He convened a grand jury to look into the Arnold Rothstein murder and it adjourned saying it could not solve the case. In 1930, he convened a grand jury to investigate job buying Magistrate George F. Ewald. When the jury did not indict, Governor Franklin D. Roosevelt convened a jury and got an indictment. In 1930, he announced a war against rackets which produced few results. Charges were filed against him for general negligence, urging his removal. This was common procedure by Anti-Tammany reformers since the precedent of 1900 when Governor Theodore Roosevelt removed D.A. Asa Bird Gardiner. This time the charges were ultimately dismissed by Governor Franklin D. Roosevelt.

After leaving the D.A.'s office at the end of his term in 1933, he became a New York Supreme Court referee. He died on May 29, 1942.

Legal offices
Preceded by Joab H. Banton	New York County District Attorney; 1930–1933	Succeeded by William C. Dodge
