= William L. Mounts =

American politician

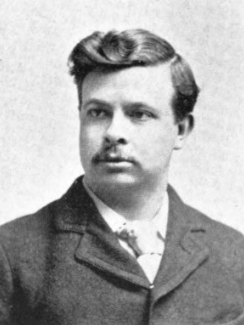

Member of the Illinois Senate
- In office 1897–1901

Member of the Illinois House of Representatives
- In office 1893–1897

Personal details
- Born: William Leon Mounts; August 31, 1862 Carlinville, Illinois, US
- Died: February 5, 1929 (aged 66) Carlinville, Illinois, US
- Party: Democratic
- Education: Blackburn College
- Occupation: Lawyer

William Leon Mounts (August 31, 1862 – February 5, 1929) was an American lawyer and politician.

== Biography ==
Mounts was born in Carlinville, Illinois. He graduated from Blackburn College in 1881 and was admitted to the Illinois bar in 1885. He practiced law in Carlinville and was involved with the banking business. He served as mayor of Carlinville. Mounts also served as city treasurer and city attorney for Carlinville. Mounts was involved with the Democratic Party. He served in the Illinois House of Representatives from 1893 to 1897 and in the Illinois Senate from 1897 to 1901. Mounts died at his home, in Carlinville, Illinois, from a long illness.
