= William Hamilton Anderson =

American politician

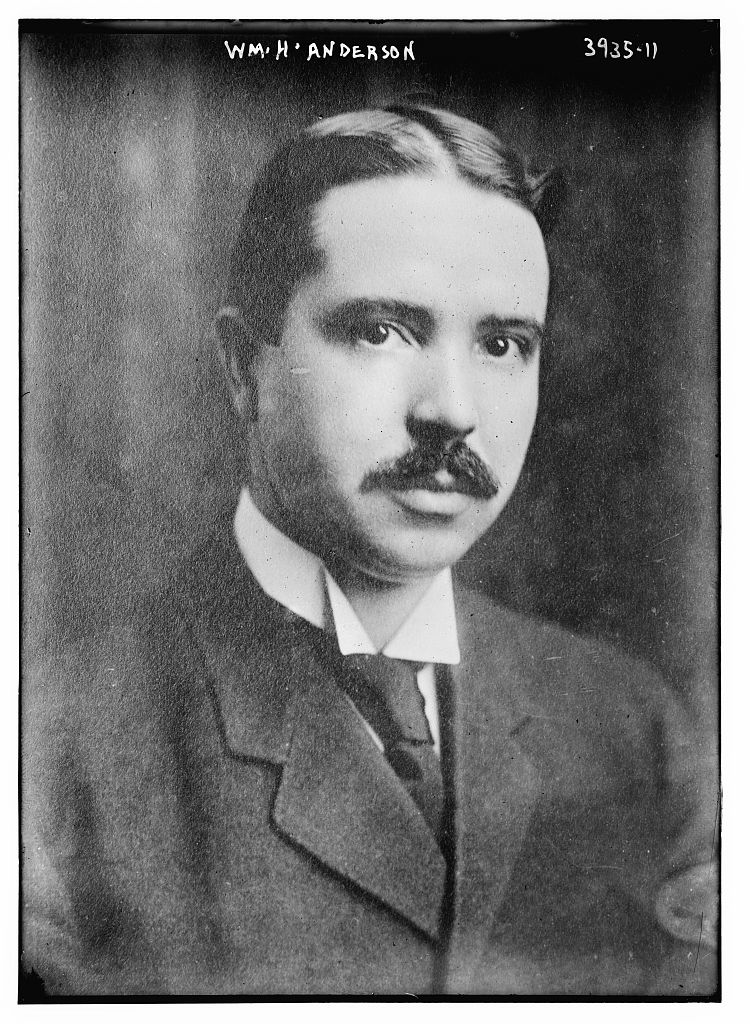
Bain News Service,, publisher. Wm. H. Anderson

William Hamilton Anderson (1874 – c. 1959) was the superintendent of the New York Anti-Saloon League. He worked toward the prohibition of alcohol and the closing of saloons. In 1924 a jury convicted him of skimming contributions to the league.

== Biography ==
William H. Anderson was born in Carlinville, Illinois in 1874. He received his B.S. from Blackburn College in Carlinville, Illinois in 1892 and an LL.B. from the University of Michigan Law School in 1896. In 1919, he was awarded an honorary LL.D from Illinois Wesleyan.

In 1900, he became an attorney for the Illinois Anti-Saloon League. After only seven years, he and the Anti-Saloon League had closed over one thousand saloons in Baltimore. He was regarded as one of the most skillful politicians and lobbyists in the state of Maryland. He married Clarice Otwell (1872–1947) on October 23, 1901 and they had at least three children. Anderson sought to advance his efforts in New York, recognizing this state as the largest city in the U.S at the time, which harbored great influence over the rest of the nation. In 1906 he became Associate State Superintendent of the Anti-Saloon League of New York, a position he held until 1914.

William H. Anderson wrote a letter on July 24, 1914 and it was published in the New York Times on July 29, 1914:

Liquor and the Drug Traffic.

To the Editor of the New York Times:

In view of the claim by opponents of prohibition that drug using is most prevalent and serious where the sale of liquor has been prohibited, I wish, while the matter is still fresh in the public mind, to call attention to the extent of the drug traffic in New York, where there is certainly no lack of liquor, as indicated by the immense amount of news and comment in the new York papers. The opponents of prohibition argue that if a prohibitory law is not enforced it should be repealed, yet nobody seems to be arguing for a repeal of the drug law. I desire also to call attention to the traffic in drugs in the prisons as indicating how little regard the political appointees of a corrupt liquor organization like Tammany have for any law they are supposed to enforce. It is also noteworthy that the recent National Convention of Alienists and Neurologists put alcohol first in the list of causes of insanity and derangement, and drugs lower down the scale. William H. Anderson, State Superintendent Anti-Saloon league of New York.

New York, July 24, 1914.

In 1919, five years after Anderson and the Anti Saloon League had arrived in New York, the Prohibition amendment was passing its way through U.S. legislation. The amendment declared that

the manufacture, sale or transportation of intoxicating liquors within, the importation thereof into, or the exportation thereof from the United States and all territory subject to the jurisdiction thereof for beverage purposes is hereby prohibited.

Suspicions arose of the possibility that Anderson had been using deception to advance the Prohibition movement. Much of his work was actually accomplished through the use of fake documents, false rumors and oral attacks towards his opponents. On July 3, 1924 he was indicted for forgery of the financial records of the Anti Saloon League. He was sentenced to two years in maximum security prison at Sing Sing.

He died around 1959.

== Quote ==
When prohibition was passed he wrote:

Be a good sport about it. No more falling off the water wagon. Uncle Sam will help you keep your pledge.

== Archive ==
- University of Chicago archive

== Publications ==
- The Church in Action Against the Saloon; American Issue Publishing Company (1910)
- Letter to the Editor, New York Times; July 29, 1914; Liquor and the Drug Traffic druglibrary.com
- The Outlook magazine; A Look at What the Prohibition Amendment Might Look Like; December 27, 1916

== Timeline ==
- 1874 Birth
- 1892 Graduation from Blackburn College
- 1900 Attorney for Illinois Anti-Saloon League
- 1901 Marriage to Clarice Otwell (1872–1947) on October 23
- 1906 Associate State Superintendent of the Anti-Saloon League of New York
- 1914 Start as General State Superintendent of the Anti-Saloon League of New York
- 1919 Honorary LL.D. from Illinois Wesleyan
- 1924 End as General State Superintendent of the Anti-Saloon League of New York
- 1924 Indictment for forgery on July 3
- 1924 Sing-Sing
- 1925 Release from prison
