= Deerbrook Mall (Illinois) =

- Location: Deerfield, Illinois
- Coordinates: 42°8′51.414″N 87°49′58.1586″W
- Address: 260 S Waukegan Road
- Opened: 1971
- Closed: C. 2014 (original indoor mall only)
- Developer: Valenti Builders
- Owner: Core Acquisitions
- Num. of stores: 16 with 5 outlot buildings
- Num. of anchor tenants: 6
- Public transit: Metra MD-N; Pace
- Website: www.shopdeerbrookmall.com

Deerbrook Mall is a shopping mall in Deerfield, Illinois. Located on 47.45 acres, its anchor stores are Marshalls, The Dump Furniture Outlet, Office Depot, Jewel Osco, Floor & Decor, and Sky Zone. The mall is located on Waukegan Road, north of the Edens Spur and south of Lake Cook Road.

== History ==
In 1970, 30 acres of land were purchased from Louis Werhane, a local farmer, with the plan to develop it into a mall. Primary construction was completed in 1971, with the mall's name being chosen by the winner of a drawing. The name is a combination of the two towns which the mall primarily serves: Deerfield and Northbrook.

Originally the internal theme of the mall was of a communal street scene with streetlamps and water fountains featuring brass frogs and other sculptures of aquatic marine life. Sunken communal seating areas contributed to the small-town Main Street-like feel. The floor was mostly made of heavily lacquered-over red and brown bricks.

Venture, the now-defunct retail chain, was a ten-year tenant in the mall. Previous to Venture, the space housed a Turn Style store. Venture closed and vacated the space in January 1989. Other large retailers who vacated the mall, primarily as a result of the economic failure and reduction of the chains themselves, include Service Merchandise, Spiegel Outlet, John M. Smyth's Homemakers and Montgomery Ward. Marshalls originally occupied the interior space, hosting TJ Maxx. Montgomery Ward also operated an auto repair and tire facility in a separate outbuilding immediately southeast of the main mall, built in 1986 and last occupied by Bally Total Fitness, and closed in the summer of 2012 the building was eventually torn down.

Best Buy, which occupied the former Spiegel space, closed in 2012. The former Best Buy space became a Hobby Lobby in 2015. The former Service Merchandise space was later, briefly occupied by The Great Indoors, and then for three months by a local children's superstore called Wonder!. In 2014, TJ Maxx, the last remaining tenant of the interior mall, announced that it would be relocating.

Deerbrook Mall formerly housed a four-screen General Cinema movie theater, which opened months after the mall's opening as a twin (a two-screen) during an expansion. Two auditoriums were added in the 1980s. The theater closed in 2001 amid the company's bankruptcy and never reopened.

In 2017, the theater, storefronts, mall interior and Ulta Beauty were demolished to make way for new construction between Hobby Lobby, south and Art Van Furniture, north. Sports Authority had closed their store as part of the chain's bankruptcy in 2016. Art Van Furniture opened Wednesday December 13, 2017, in the former Sports Authority location. OfficeMax closed on Saturday, December 16, 2017.

On March 5, 2020, it was announced that Art Van Furniture would be closing as Art Van prepares to file for Chapter 11 bankruptcy and the location was eventually closed. On April 24, 2023, the closure of all remaining Illinois Bed Bath & Beyond stores was announced, and the location liquidated and closed. Floor & Decor moved into the former Bed Bath & Beyond space the following year.

On October 24, 2023, it was reported that a townhome complex named "Springs at Deerfield" would be built behind the mall. Construction began the following year, with move-ins expected in 2025 and construction to be finished in 2026. The name was later revealed to be "Springs at Lake Cook Crossing".

In 2025, Mid-America represented the owner in selling the property to Core Acquisitions for $44 million.

== 1994 fire ==
In May 1994, a fire broke out in the Bed Bath & Beyond store. Twelve separate towns' fire departments and the Northern Illinois Police Alarm System responded to the blaze, which began on the loading dock and spread to the interior of the store, damaging merchandise and the interior ceiling.

== Renovation ==
In 1998, Lendlease acquired Deerbrook Mall on behalf of one of its public pension fund clients from Valenti Builders, a Northfield, Illinois–based company. The new owners began a major interior and exterior renovation to update the aging mall which had been plagued by high vacancy rates. Subsequent major renovations between 2015 and 2017 included demolition of the enclosed portion of the mall in favor of major standalone anchor tenants.
