= Deerbrook Mall (Texas) =

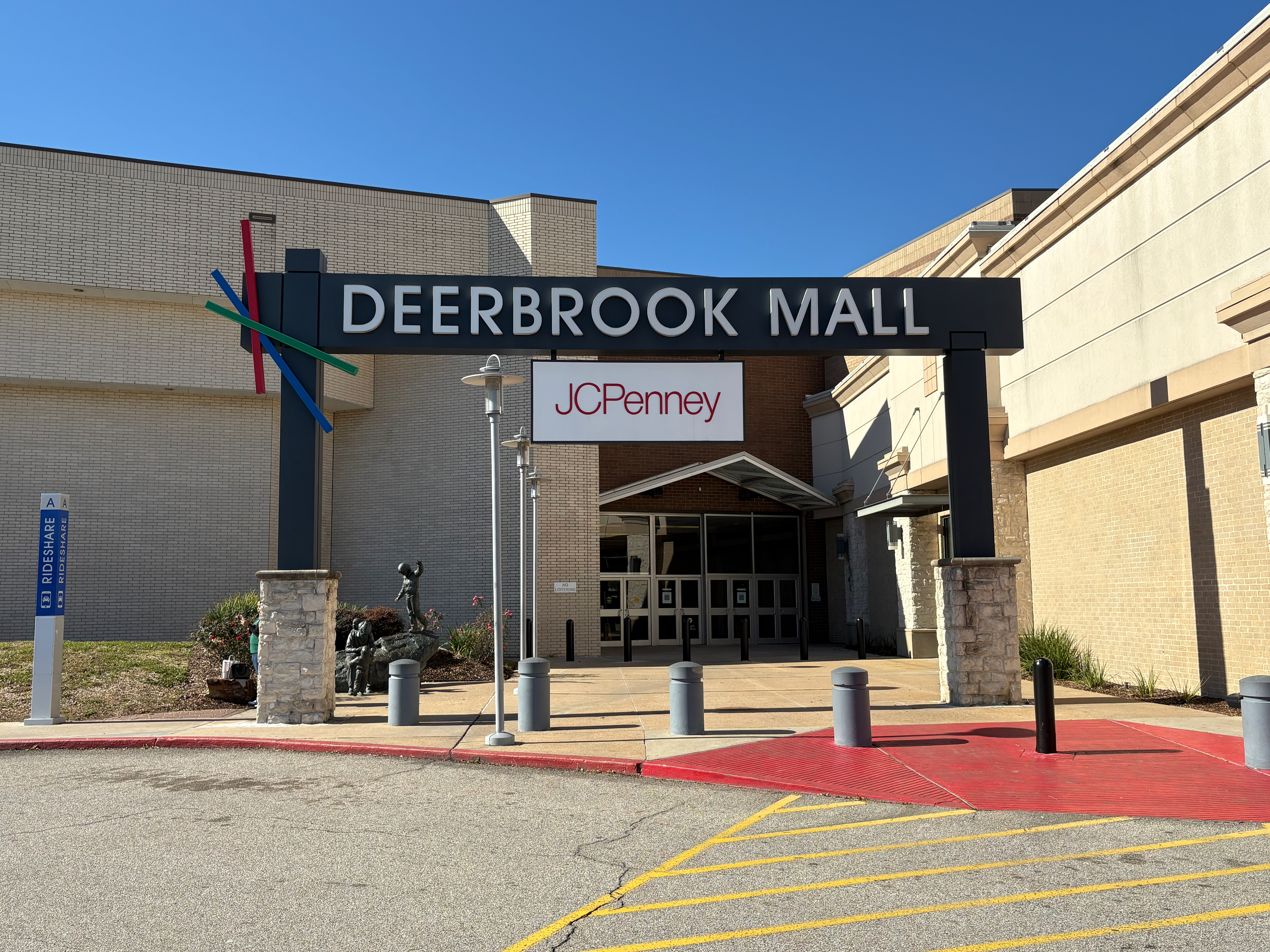
- Side Entrance of Deerbrook Mall (2025)
- Location: Humble, Texas, United States
- Coordinates: 30.0098°N 95.2703°W
- Address: 20131 Eastex Freeway
- Opened: 1984 (42 years ago)
- Developer: Homart Development Company
- Manager: GGP
- Owner: GGP
- Num. of stores: 128
- Floor area: 1,200,000 sq ft (110,000 m^{2})
- Floors: 2 (3 in Dillard's and Macy's)
- Website: shopdeerbrookmall.com

Deerbrook Mall is a mall located in the northern Houston suburb of Humble. It is at the major intersection of I-69/US 59 and FM 1960, near George Bush Intercontinental Airport. Deerbrook Mall is classified as a super-regional mall and is the only mall (for now) in suburban Northeast Houston. The mall is in the middle of Humble's entertainment complex which includes restaurants, other shopping outlets, movie theaters, as well as communities, which creates heavy traffic and congestion during traffic rush hour and weekend rushes. Deerbrook is owned and managed by GGP, a subsidiary of Brookfield Properties.

== History ==
Deerbrook Mall opened in 1984 with 1,200,000 sq ft (110,000 m^{2}) and over 120 stores, anchored by Foley's, Sears, Mervyn's and the first Macy's store in Greater Houston. The mall quickly became successful, attracting affluent shoppers from areas situated on Lake Houston including Kingwood and Atascocita, along with shoppers from the Spring, Sheldon, Crosby and Porter areas, and its trade area even extended to the Aldine, Greenspoint and North Forest areas of Houston. During the 1990s, the mall underwent a number of changes, including Macy's sale of all but one Houston store to Dillard's, the addition of JCPenney to one of its empty anchor pads, and a 24-screen AMC Theatres complex connected to the mall's "Silver Screen" food court in the central portion of the mall.

A Barnes & Noble store opened at the mall in 2003. In 2006, the mall underwent another anchor charge as Foley's converted to Macy's in 2008 Circuit City relocated into the space previously occupied by Mervyn's which exited the Houston market. After Circuit City went bankrupt in 2009, the space was occupied by Total Home Furniture and Decor for a brief period before being filled by a large-format Forever 21. Compared to other Houston malls, Deerbrook appears to attract fewer upscale retailers, many of which are located in the Kingwood Commons shopping center in the nearby master planned community of Kingwood, and could be vulnerable to competition from developments in Kingwood and eastern Montgomery County.

In Spring 2014, Express and Yankee Candle underwent renovation at the mall. The new Express store was one of the first stores in the Houston area to take part in the new design.

In Fall 2016, Dick's Sporting Goods joined the mall's lineup, constructing a new two-story, 80,000 sq. ft. store across from Forever 21.

During the 2010s and early 2020s, Deerbrook Mall began to lose some of its most valuable stores like Gap, Footaction, and one of its major tenants, Sears. Stores like Gap and Sears had been a tenant at the mall since it opened in 1984. Sears announced their liquidation sale would begin on February 8, 2020 as part of a plan to close 39 stores nationwide. The store closed in April 2020.

In 2022, SuperNova Furniture, a furniture store, took over the space where Forever 21 was located. The store encompasses 86,000 square feet (7989.7 m²).

As of 2025, Round1 Entertainment began constructing an arcade in the former Palais Royal anchor store. Their expected opening date was early 2025 and on February 15, 2025, Round1 Entertainment opened. Another entertainment company known as Score Entertainment announced in 2025 that they plan to open an entertainment facility within the former Sears sometime in 2026.
