= New York Anti-Saloon League =

The New York Anti-Saloon League was an American organization that worked toward the prohibition of alcohol and the closing of saloons. Located at 156 Fifth Avenue in Manhattan, it was an offshoot of the Ohio-based Anti-Saloon League. Adna W. Leonard of Buffalo, New York was its president. The superintendent of the group was William Hamilton Anderson, of who said of prohibition: "Be a good sport about it. No more falling off the water wagon. Uncle Sam will help you keep your pledge."
