= Lincolnshire-Prairie View School District 103 =

School district in Illinois, United States

Address
- 111 Barclay Boulevard Lincolnshire, Lake County, Illinois, 60069; United States

District information
- Type: Public
- Motto: Leaders in Learning
- Grades: PreK–8
- Established: 1836
- Superintendent: Dr. Katie Reynolds
- School board: 7 members
- Schools: 3
- NCES District ID: 1723090

Students and staff
- Students: 1,878 (as of 2025)
- Teachers: 163 (as of 2025)
- Student–teacher ratio: 11.5
- Athletic conference: Stevenson High School
- District mascot: Wildcats (Sprague), Hawks (Half Day), Warriors (Daniel Wright)
- Colors: Red (Sprague), Blue (Half Day), Green (Daniel Wright)

Other information
- Website: www.d103.org

Lincolnshire-Prairie View School District 103 (commonly known as District 103 or D103) is a public elementary school district located in Lincolnshire, Lake County, Illinois, in suburban Chicago. Established in 1836, it is the oldest school district in Lake County.

The school district serves approximately 1,900 students from the communities of Lincolnshire and Prairie View, and portions of Buffalo Grove, Vernon Hills, Mettawa, Riverwoods, and Lake Forest. Students attend Laura B. Sprague Elementary School, Half Day School and Daniel Wright Junior High School. Students from this district usually attend Adlai E. Stevenson High School District 125 after graduating from District 103.

== History and etymology ==
Approximate location of Sprague’s cabin, the first school building

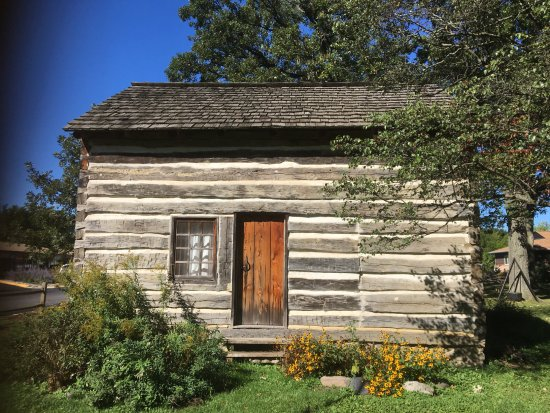
Caspar Ott Cabin, built in 1837, located in Deerfield Historic Village, is the oldest surviving structure in Lake County. Although no photographs or physical evidence survives of Laura B. Sprague’s cabin today, historical records show that this cabin is closely similar in structure to the school building.

=== Early history ===
The earliest school building in District 103 was a small log cabin south of Indian Creek (not to be confused with the village in Vernon Township) and east of Milwaukee Road, which is now a shopping plaza. It was founded in 1836 by schoolteacher Laura Bronson Simons (née Sprague; born February 2, 1815, Hamburg, New York – died August 12, 1899, Chicago) in her home, making it the first school in Lake County.

Only a maximum of around 10 children could attend, and families paid Sprague roughly $2–3 a week for tuition. Instruction was largely improvisational, focusing on basic literacy and practical numeracy. Sprague taught children of varying ages simultaneously, organizing lessons around rote memorization and oral recitation rather than formal grade levels. The curriculum mainly centered around the Bible, Noah Webster's The American Spelling Book, and McGuffey Readers. Children had regular interaction with the remaining natives, the Potawatomi, while walking to and from school. In addition, the cabin routinely became a community center, hosting church services.

Sprague married Edward Simons and moved out of Half Day around 1837. In December 1838, a diphtheria outbreak killed four of the students. Lake County had established nine official school districts by the time of the following year. In May 1840, a fire burned off a significant portion of the log cabin and left five students with injuries. Neighbors helped with the repairs, and teaching shortly resumed. Half Day School was officially established as District 1 in 1846.

By the second half of the 19th century, the log cabin was replaced with a functioning one-room public school building with help from the community. At that time, the area of Half Day had become a unincorporated, bustling community, causing more demand for enrolling in the school. Half Day was named after a local Potawatomi chief named Aptakisic, whose name translates to “sun at the meridian” or “half day”. Three popular misconceptions arose regarding the origin of the place’s name. The first claimed that Half Day was named for its travel length, taking half a day from Chicago via carriage. The second alleges that a local chief named “Halfda” was incorrectly transcribed by a cartographer as “Half Day” as the name of the area. A third, unsubstantiated story claims that during the federal removal of Potawatomi peoples in the 1830s under the 1833 Treaty of Chicago, some resistant tribespeople who lived there managed to defend the area for half of a day until they were eventually captured and removed. All three are false. Seth Washburn was the first postmaster in Lake County, appointed in 1836. He built the first sawmill near Wright's homestead, and his family later donated the land for the Washburn Congregational Church and where the present Half Day school would be located.

=== Expansion ===
In 1876, a one-room frame school was built on the present school site, designed to hold around sixty students. At the turn of the twentieth century, District 1 was renamed District 103 due to a state mandate. More improvements and construction projects were made to the school. In 1938, the old section of the present Half Day School was constructed. More expansions and renovations took place at Half Day over the next 30 years.

During the 1950s and 1960s, the population of Lincolnshire grew rapidly due to the post-war boom following World War II, which led to the congestion of Half Day. In 1963, a referendum was approved to build a new school, Laura B. Sprague Elementary. Additionally, further demand led to the construction of Daniel Wright Junior High School in February 1972.

=== Closure of Half Day ===
Due to declining enrollment in the early 1980s, in June 1983, the Aptakisic-Tripp Community Consolidated School District 102 in neighboring Buffalo Grove occupied the building for their students. However, in late 1992, Half Day reopened for District 103 students. A year later, Vernon Hills forcibly annexed the unincorporated community of Half Day, but part of the remaining land went under Lincolnshire.

=== Renovations ===
Ahead of the 2017–2018 school year, both Laura B. Sprague School and Half Day Intermediate School completed new expansions and renovations to their learning spaces. Half Day Intermediate School received an eleven-thousand square foot expansion, with a new second-story addition. Both of these works were part of a broader $14.8 million D103 plan to update their schools.

During the COVID-19 pandemic, Daniel Wright Junior High School opened new renovations and interior improvements. The estimated cost was about $8 million.

== Schools ==
As of 2026, current info on these three schools are listed as:

School	Grade	Location	Year opened	Enrollment	Principal
Laura B. Sprague School	PreK–2	Lincolnshire	1964	~550	Julia Pemberton
Half Day School	3–5	Lincolnshire (formerly Half Day)	1938 (current building)	~620	Jill Mau
Daniel Wright Junior High School	6–8	Lincolnshire (formerly Lake Forest)	1972	~720	Jessica Groncki

== District 125 Consortium ==
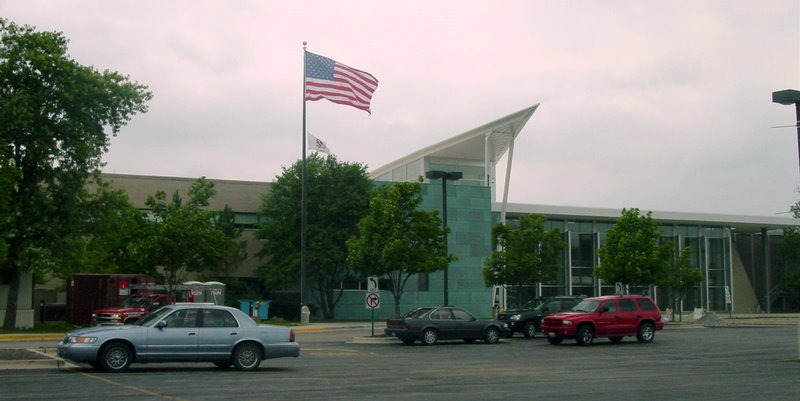
Stevenson High School, District 125

District 103's Daniel Wright, along with other middle and junior high schools in the neighboring area, are part of a collective group in which students attend Stevenson High School in Lincolnshire after graduating their respective schools. In addition, the consortium is used as an athletic conference and hosts competitions and games between various districts. The high school draws its student body from several key schools, with varying proportions of students feeding into District 125 based on elementary district lines:

- Hawthorn Middle School (Hawthorn CCSD 73)
- West Oak Middle School (Diamond Lake SD 76)
- Fremont Middle School (Fremont SD 79)
- Twin Groves Middle School (Kildeer Countryside CCSD 96)
- Woodlawn Middle School (Kildeer Countryside CCSD 96)
- Aptakisic Junior High School (Aptakisic-Tripp CCSD 102)

== Board of Education ==
District 103 is governed by a seven-member Board of Education elected by district voters to staggered four-year terms. The board appoints the superintendent, who oversees district operations. The president of the Board of Education is Anne van Gerven, and the superintendent is Katie Reynolds.

== Instructional program ==
The instructional program for students focuses on skill development in core academic areas that include reading/language arts, math, science, Spanish, and social science. The curriculum envelops social/emotional learning, as well as national educational technology standards. Furthermore, the curriculum provides students with learning opportunities in physical education/health, fine arts, foreign language, and home economics studies. In addition to the common core standards, an Enrichment Learning Model (ELM) is present, as well as specialized guided program for ones with special needs.

== Statistics ==
=== Demographics ===
D103 reported for the 2025–26 school year, approximately (out of roughly 1,878) 48.7% of students enrolled were Asian or Pacific Islander, 41.3% were Caucasian, 5.1% were multiracial or two or more races, 3.1% Latino, 1.5% African-American, and 0.3% American Indian. 54% were male and 46% were female, 10% of students reported learning English as a second language, and a total of 45 extra languages were spoken at home, common first languages including Mandarin, Hindi, Korean, Japanese, Marathi, Polish, Russian, Spanish, Tamil, and Telugu. 14.7% were classified as having chronic absenteeism, 6.2% were on the district’s guided program, and 1% were low-income.

=== Teachers ===
Out of 1,878 students, the district contains 163 teachers, with a student-teacher ratio of 11.5:1, lower than the state average of 14:1. 100% of teachers are licensed and D103 reports that the teacher retention rate is 95.4%, with a 78% attendance rate for the 2024–25 school year. The median district salary for teachers is roughly $72,417.

=== Budget ===
For the 2026–27 school year, D103 adopted a budget through a unanimous vote by the Board of Education. Out of the approximately $57 million revenue, 80% were funded by local property taxes, and the rest supplemented by state and federal funding. Operating expenditures average roughly $19,952 per student, with classroom instruction accounting for about $12,000 per student.

=== Performance ===
Daniel Wright earned number 17th ranking out of 1,000 middle/junior high schools in the 2026 U.S. News & World Report Best Middle Schools report. 85% of students in the district achieved expected or high growths in MAP testing. According to the Illinois Report Card, District 103 students consistently score above the state average on standardized assessments.

==== Honors and awards ====
All three District 103 schools have been named Blue Ribbon Schools by the U.S. Department of Education. Some acknowledgements from 2008 onward include:

- The district received the 2008 Academic Excellence Awards as Illinois Honor Roll Schools.
- District received the State Board of Education Financial Recognition Award for 22 years.

== Incidents and controversies ==
=== Reid v. Board of Education ===
In 1989, Stephen Reid, a student classified by the district as a child in need of special educational services, was recommended by the district to be placed in a residential school. There were no openings available at that time, so Stephen stayed at D103's public school for the time being. In February, Stephen's health deteriorated, prompting Stephen's parents—Barry and Maria—to pay for hospitalization and later private education out-of-pocket.

The Reids requested a Level I administrative hearing under the Illinois School Code, putting the district's services and education for Stephen in question. D103 and the Special Education District of Lake County (SEDOL) appealed; however, a Level II hearing officer affirmed the ruling in favor of the Reids, making the administrative decision final and ordering the district to reimburse them.

The Level II officer ordered the Reids to submit itemized bills. They submitted partial bills, leading D103 to do an independent estimate and pay a lesser amount for the case study than what the Reids expected. The school and Special Education Department of the Administrative of the Illinois State Board of Education supervisor William Charis sent a letter to the Reids, stating that the district complied with the Level II order.

Claiming the school failed to adequately provide services for Stephen under the Education for All Handicapped Children Act of 1975 (EHA) and fully abide by the administrative decision to cover exact expenses, the Reids filed a civil suit in state court. The defendants successfully moved the case to the federal district court.

On June 14, 1991, District Judge Brian Barnett Duff issued the memorandum opinion granting in part and denying the defendant's motion to dismiss the plaintiff's claim. The court also dismissed Mr. Charis and the State Board of Education.

=== Conway Farms territorial dispute ===
In 1988, the city of Lake Forest annexed the 700 acre Conway Farms residential and commercial development, in an attempt for the area to feed into its schools (District 67 and 115). The area that previously occupied Conway Farms that was split between Lincolnshire Praire-View District 103, Adlai E. Stevenson High School District 125, Libertyville High School District 128, and Rondout School District 72, were risking losing millions in tax revenue.

The dispute went on until it went to the state level in 1996, when Governor Jim Edgar signed a piece of legislation allowing homeowners in Conway Farms to successfully transfer their properties in the Lake Forest district boundaries.

The legislation was not received favorably by the other school districts, and in 1997, the dispute was resolved through a compromise agreement. Under the settlement, children living on the Conway Farms residential property were to attend the Lake Forest schools. The five districts also agreed to split the tax revenues until 2017.

=== Mascot change ===
In August 2020, ahead of the 2020–2021 school year, Daniel Wright Junior High School changed its mascot from a Trojan to a Warrior, due to the potential for sensitivity or criticism regarding the potential nature and connotation of the term, in response to the death and subsequent protests regarding George Floyd. A spokesperson on behalf of the district stated that “we are standardizing and updating human-based, culturally sensitive aspects…to align with our modern educational values.” Prior to the change, petitions were made online to discuss possible alternatives, most notably a request to change the mascot to “the Dumplings” to reflect the district's Asian-American student population.

=== COVID-19 mask policy lawsuit ===
In October 2021, District 103 was named alongside 15 other Lake and McHenry County school districts in a class-action lawsuit against Illinois Governor JB Pritzker. The lawsuit—filed on behalf of the parents—challenged the mandatory mask rules and policies, stating that it is unlawful for schools to exclude students that have been in close contact with a COVID-19 case without the consent of parents.

=== Bomb threat ===
On Monday, August 28, 2023, a bomb threat was called to Daniel Wright Junior High School via a computer-recorded message on the school's attendance voicemail. Another threat was called to South Elgin High School. The actual message was left on the previous day but was not heard until staff checked the voicemail at 7:30 a.m. on Monday. All the students were evacuated to a secure location and police searched the premises of the school, but no bomb was ever found. As of 2026, the police have not announced any arrests.

=== Lunch schedule ===
At the beginning of the 2026–2027 school year, controversy arose when Daniel Wright Principal Jessica Groncki shortened the lunch period from 30 minutes to 20 minutes to reallocate the time for increased passing periods. Many students and their respective parents protested as they felt that the lunch time was insufficient. Several people complained of hunger due to a lack of time to eat. One group of parents argued that the shortened lunch time damaged children's mental, emotional, and social well-being. They started a petition on change.org that has received over 500 signatures.

== In popular culture ==
=== National anthem ===
On Wednesday, April 22, 1998, the Daniel Wright Junior High School (then Daniel Wright Middle School) marching band, conducted by former director Rodney Owens, played the national anthem at Wrigley Field during the San Diego Padres vs. Chicago Cubs game.

=== Science Olympiad championships ===
In both 2016 and 2017, Daniel Wright Junior High School won the Science Olympiad National Tournament on the Division B level.

=== 2019 Science Bowl team ===
During the 2019 annual U.S. Department of Energy National Science Bowl from April 25–29 at Chevy Chase, Maryland, the Daniel Wright team placed third in the nation.
