= Fremont School District 79 =

School district in Illinois, United States

Address
- 28855 North Fremont Center Road Mundelein, Illinois, 60060; United States

District information
- Motto: Preparing today's child for tomorrow's world
- Grades: Preschool-8
- Superintendent: Dr. Trisha Kocanda

Students and staff
- Students: 2,100
- Teachers: 158

Other information
- Website: Official website

Fremont School District 79 is a school district located in Mundelein, Illinois. The district is composed of Lincoln Early Learning Center, Fremont Elementary School, Fremont Intermediate School, and Fremont Middle School. The district is led by superintendent Dr. Trisha Kocanda.

The school district holds 2,100 students in grades preschool through eighth grade. The school district serves students in a 34-mile radius from the communities of: Mundelein, Wauconda, Hawthorn Woods, Grayslake, Round Lake, Long Grove, and Libertyville.

There are 158 full and part-time teachers and administrators. Of that number, 71 percent of the educators hold a master's degree or higher. Teachers have an average experience of 13 years teaching. Fremont employs 292 teachers and support staff that helps educate students.

== Fremont Middle School ==
Fremont Middle School was the original building that was built for the district in 1957. The school only had 12 classrooms and one small gym to host all the students in totaling 18,200 square feet. Every year, the district kept getting more and more students moving into the district and it was getting very tight in the very few classrooms.

In the early 1990s, a whole new wing of classrooms was added on both floors, and they got a brand new gymnasium. Then in 2007 after the modeling project was completed, the school now has 41 classrooms, 2 gymnasiums, a media center, science labs, and a cafeteria totaling 99,600 square feet.

Until the late 1990s, the middle school hosted all the grades k-8 in the building until the elementary building was built. Until the elementary building was built, the middle school was called Fremont School. Once that was finished, the grades K-3 moved to the new building making the middle school hosting the grades 4–8. That was all in place until the intermediate school was built in 2007. And since it was built, the middle school hosts the grades 6–8.

In the 2007–2008 school year, the school added teams to each grade. Each student in 6th, 7th, or 8th grade would either be put on the White or Green team. Those colors represent the school's mascot colors. The students can get moved around from team to team every year.

Fremont Middle School also housed the state champ Cale Sethna in cross country during the 2016 season.

The school also has classes called related studies. There are different combinations of classes each grade can take. The related studies classes include classes in these categories:

- Drama
- Art
- Spanish
- Band
- Technology
- Vocal Music

The school also has extra curricular activities and clubs that the students can join, including:

- Art club
- Broadcast
- Bus Patrol
- Fremont Friends
- Juggling
- Kindness
- Math Club
- Math Team
- Newspaper
- NJHS
- Science Olympiad
- Service
- Stock Market
- Technology
- Yearbook
- LGBTQ+ Club
- Three different jazz bands: Jazz Band I= 8th grade, Jazz Band II= 7th grade, Jazz Band III= 6th grade

The middle school also has sports teams. Both girls and boys in 7th and 8th grade can try out for volleyball and basketball, and grades 6–8 can participate in soccer, track, and cross country. Wrestling is another sport now being offered. The rival schools include:

- Woodlawn Middle School in Long Grove
- Twin Groves Middle School in Buffalo Grove
- Aptakisic Junior High School in Buffalo Grove
- Daniel Wright Junior High School in Lincolnshire
- West Oak Middle School in Mundelein

Girls can also be in cheerleading or Poms.

After 8th grade, the students will attend Mundelein High School, Carmel High School, Adlai E. Stevenson High School, or Grayslake Central High School.

The principal is Dr. Emily Loerakker and the Associate Principal is Nick Atchley.

The school address is: 28871 N. Fremont Center Road Mundelein, IL 60060.

== Fremont Elementary School ==
The elementary school was the second school added to the district in 1998. It was built with 42 classrooms, a gymnasium, cafeteria, and a media center in 96,011 square feet.

When the elementary school was built, the grades K-3 moved there from the Middle School across the street. Then when the Intermediate School was built next door, 3rd Grade moved over there. Currently, Fremont Elementary School hosts the grades Kindergarten, 1st, and 2nd Grades.

The school backs up to the Lake County Forest Preserve. The school is also next door to the soccer fields where the Mundelein Soccer teams plays. There is also a frisbee golf course where students can go to play during recess and PE class.

The principal is Stefan Ladenburger for K-5. Cathy Park is the associate principal for K-5. Andrea Wiklund serves as assistant principal at the elementary school.

The school address is: 28908 N. Fremont Center Road Mundelein, IL 60060.

== Fremont Intermediate School ==
The Fremont Intermediate School was built and added to the district in 2007 making it the newest building in the district. It was built with 51 classrooms, a gymnasium, cafeteria, and a media center in 118.458 square feet making it the biggest building out of the districts 3. The Intermediate School hosts the grades 3rd, 4th, and 5th. It is connected to the Elementary School next door.

It opened for its first school year for the 2007–2008 school year. The building wasn't finished completely in time. The gym was still until construction along with the cafeteria. So the students had to use the Elementary School for lunch and gym class for the first few months of the school year.

The principal is Stefan Ladenburger for K-5 and Cathy Park is the associate principal. The assistant principal is Alana Davidov.

The school address is: 28754 N. Fremont Center Road Mundelein, IL 60060.

== Lincoln Early Learning Center ==
Fremont School District 79 relocated its preschool and early childhood programs to Lincoln Early Learning Center in 2015. Currently, the programs use four classrooms where 120 students attend school. The remainder of the building is shared with similar programs occupied by Hawthorn School District 73 and Mundelein School District 75.

The school address is: 200 W. Maple Avenue, Mundelein, IL, 60060.

== Fremont Transportation Building ==
The transportation building opened in 2007 and is located right next to the intermediate school. The building contains offices, meeting lounge, and 3 bays where mechanics can perform repairs on buses.

Fremont School District 79 owns its own fleet of school buses which are kept at the Transportation Center when they are not in use. There are currently around 40 bus routes for both the middle school, elementary/intermediate school, and preschool routes. Each bus runs a separate route for the middle school, elementary/intermediate schools, and Lincoln. Fremont also has a good amount of special education buses going to various centers around Lake County.

The transportation building address is: 28750 N. Fremont Center Road Mundelein, IL 60060.

== Fremont District Office ==
The district office opened in 1996 and is located right next to the middle school. The 4,236 square foot building contains 6 offices, and 2 small meeting rooms.

The district office address is: 28855 N. Fremont Center Road Mundelein, IL 60060.
