= Vernon Area Public Library =

Public library in Illinois, US

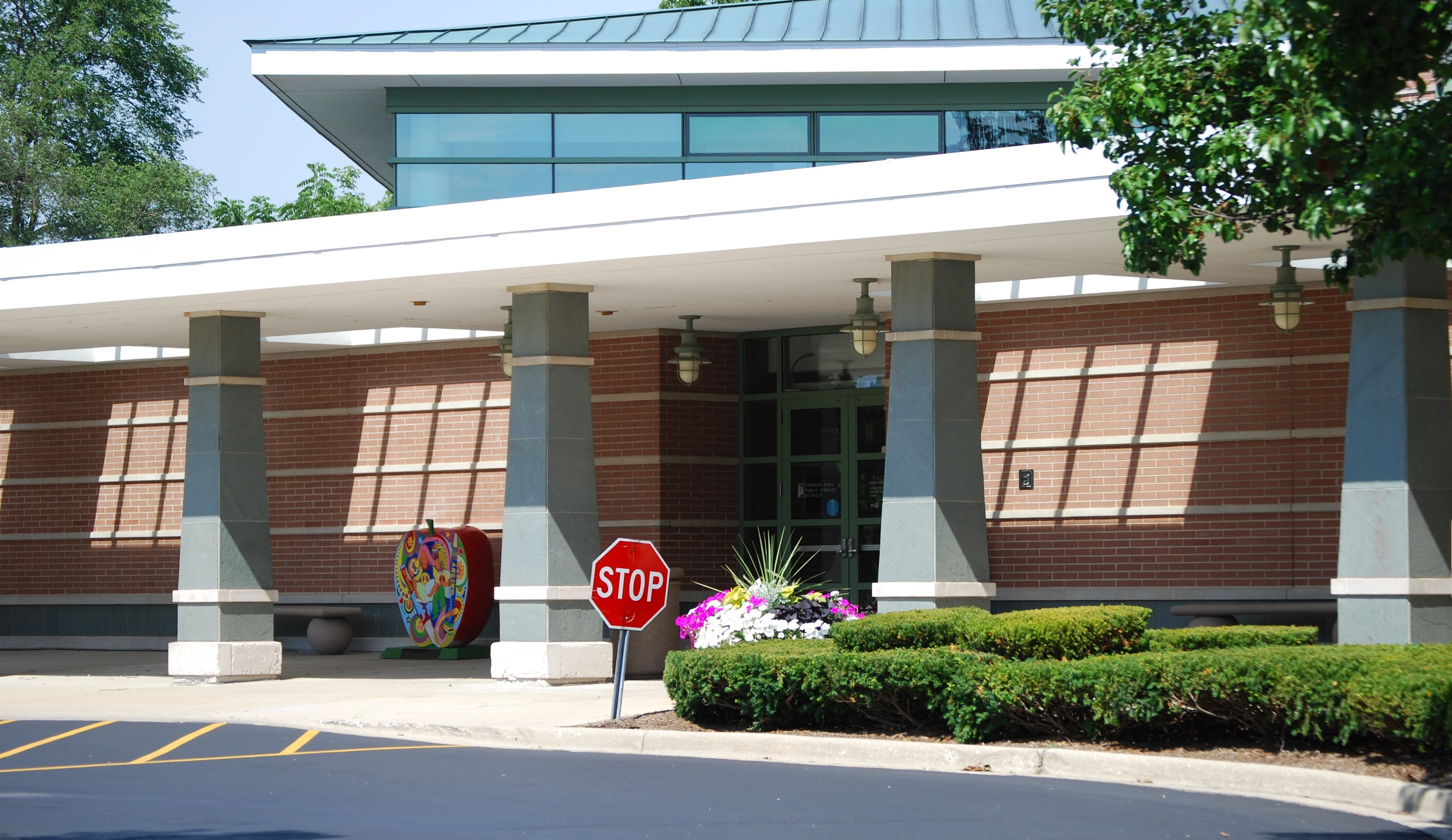
- Exterior view of the library
- 42.198681°N 87.936725°W
- Location: Lincolnshire, Illinois
- Established: 1974

Collection
- Size: 178,358 (2025)

Access and use
- Circulation: 583,069 (2025)
- Population served: 41,055 (2010)
- Members: 31,452 (2016)

Other information
- Website: www.vapld.info

Vernon Area Public Library is a public library in Lake County, Illinois, United States, serving the communities of Lincolnshire and unincorporated Prairie View, most of Long Grove, and smaller portions of Buffalo Grove, Riverwoods and Vernon Hills. It operates a single library in Lincolnshire.

The Vernon Area Public Library offers access to nearly 200,000 physical items, along with programming and instruction for all ages. The library also delivers materials to senior centers in the area.

The Vernon Area Public Library was counted among America's Star Libraries for 2010, 2011, and 2013 as named by Library Journal.

== History ==
The Vernon Area Public Library began in 1974 in a classroom in Stevenson High School and later moved to a temporary building in the high school parking lot. The first permanent library building was constructed at 4 Indian Creek Road in Lincolnshire. On March 20, 1990, voters approved a referendum for the sale of $6.9 million in bonds to support the construction of a new library to be built adjacent to the existing library building. On September 15, 1993, the Vernon Area Public Library opened to the public at 300 Olde Half Day Road in Lincolnshire. The 50,000 sq ft (4,600 m^{2}) building was designed to meet the needs of a growing library district. The library has a 16,000 sq ft (1,500 m^{2}) Adult Services department and 12,000 sq ft (1,100 m^{2}) Youth Services department. The library shelved nearly 200,000 items at its peak before the COVID-19 pandemic, but as of 2025 has around 170,000 items. Public spaces include a meeting room, a cafe with beverage and snack vending machines, a quiet reading room, study rooms, computers (PCs and Macs), a media lab, and a computer classroom. A plan to expand the library will be voted on by the public in November 2026. This plan would include renovations, a new main entrance, and would create more meeting spaces within the library.

== Collection and services ==
=== Subscription databases ===
Vernon Area Public Library cardholders may use their library card to access information from reliable online resources through the library website, including:

- America the Beautiful (Scholastic)
- back issues of the Chicago Tribune and The New York Times
- Biography in Context (Gale)
- Consumer Reports Online
- Gale Courses (Gale)
- Gale Virtual Reference Library (Gale)
- Lands and Peoples (Scholastic)
- Literature Criticism (Gale)
- Lynda.com (Lynda)
- Standard & Poor's
