= Aptakisic-Tripp Community Consolidated School District 102 =

School district in Illinois, United States

Aptakisic-Tripp Community Consolidated School District #102 (D102)
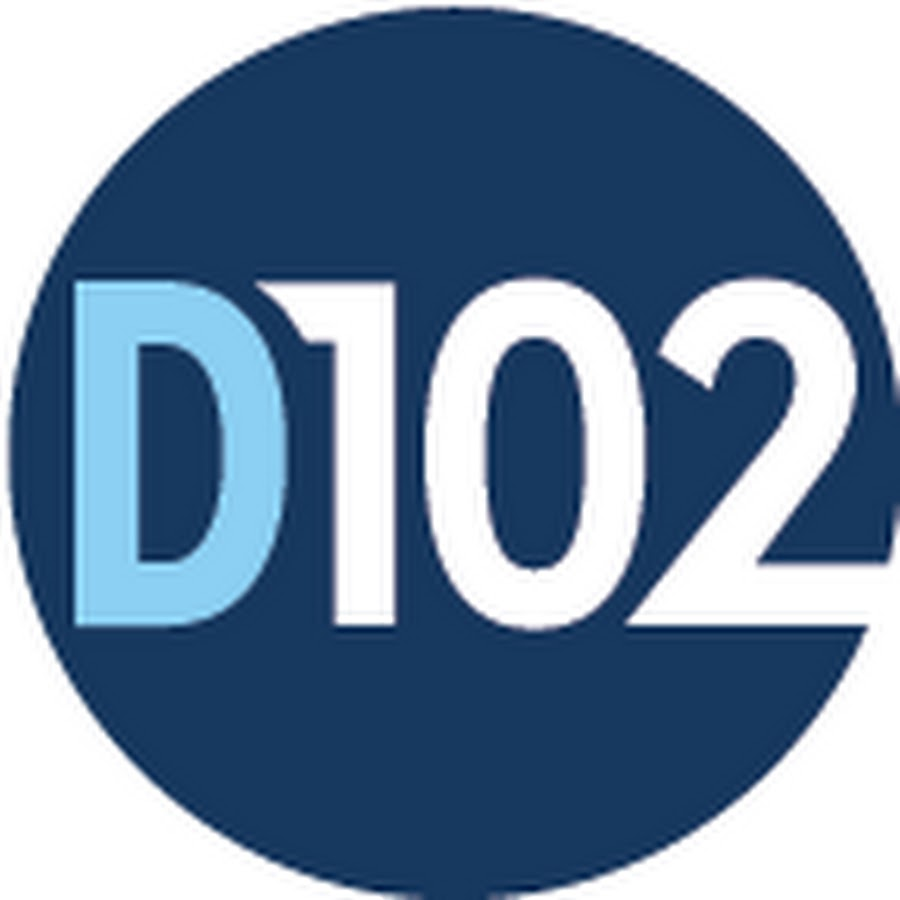

Address
- 1351 Abbott Court Buffalo Grove, Illinois, 60089; United States

District information
- Type: Public school district
- Grades: Pre-K-8
- Established: 1956; 70 years ago
- Superintendent: Dr. Jessica McIntyre
- NCES District ID: 1703900
- Enrollment: 2,538 (as of 2024)

Other information
- Website: www.d102.org

Aptakisic-Tripp School District 102 (D102) is a school district in Buffalo Grove, Lake County, Illinois. It operates four schools and serves approximately 2,590 students in grades Early Childhood through 8th grade. Most students live in Buffalo Grove north of Lake Cook Road, a northern suburb of Chicago, and some live in the Lake County part of Wheeling, unincorporated Prairie View, Aptakisic, or Deerfield.

== Schools ==
Students who live in the district will attend Stevenson High School in Lincolnshire; Stevenson is its own independent district, District 125.

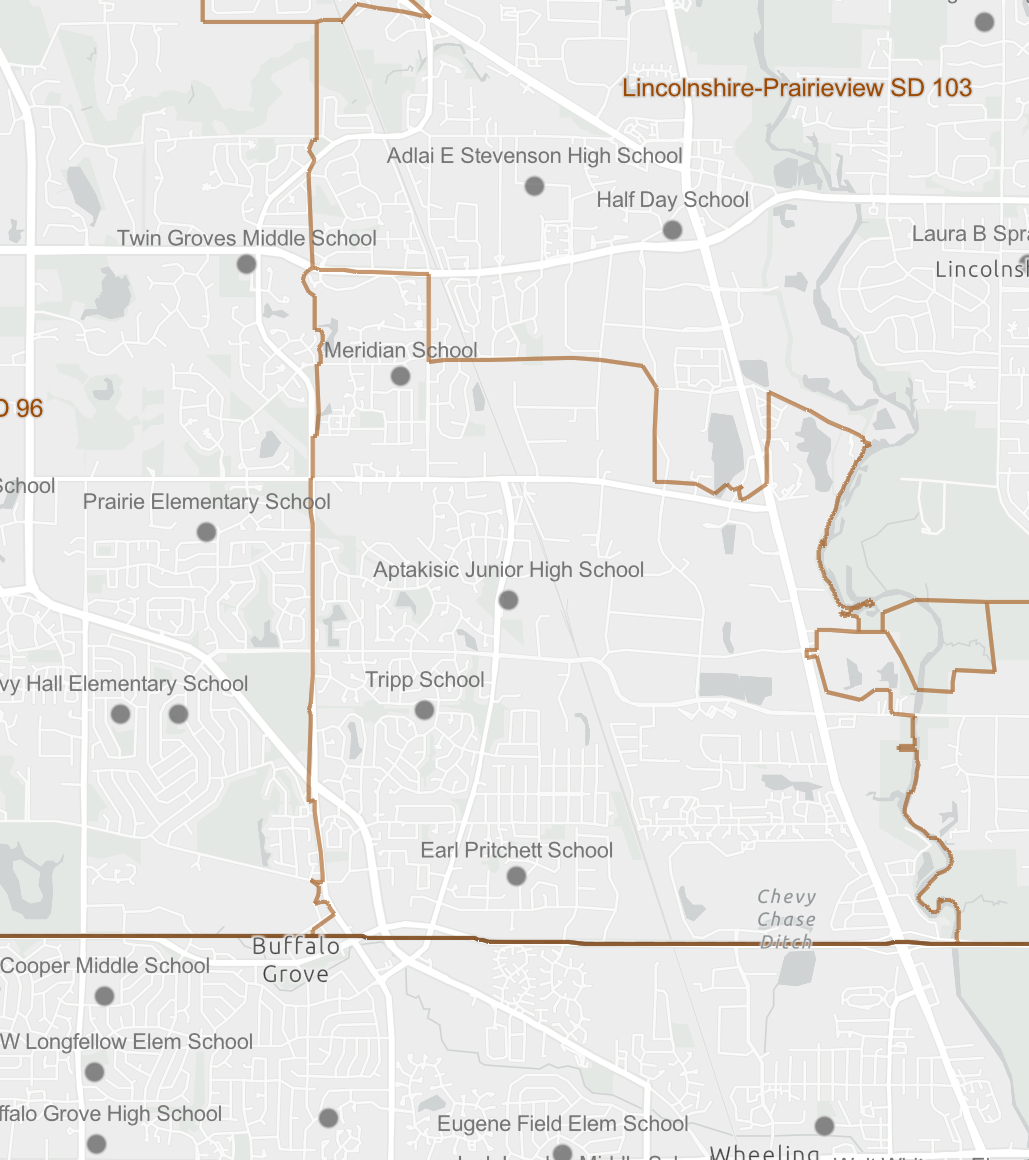
Map of the Aptakisic-Tripp school district with surrounding districts

=== Elementary ===
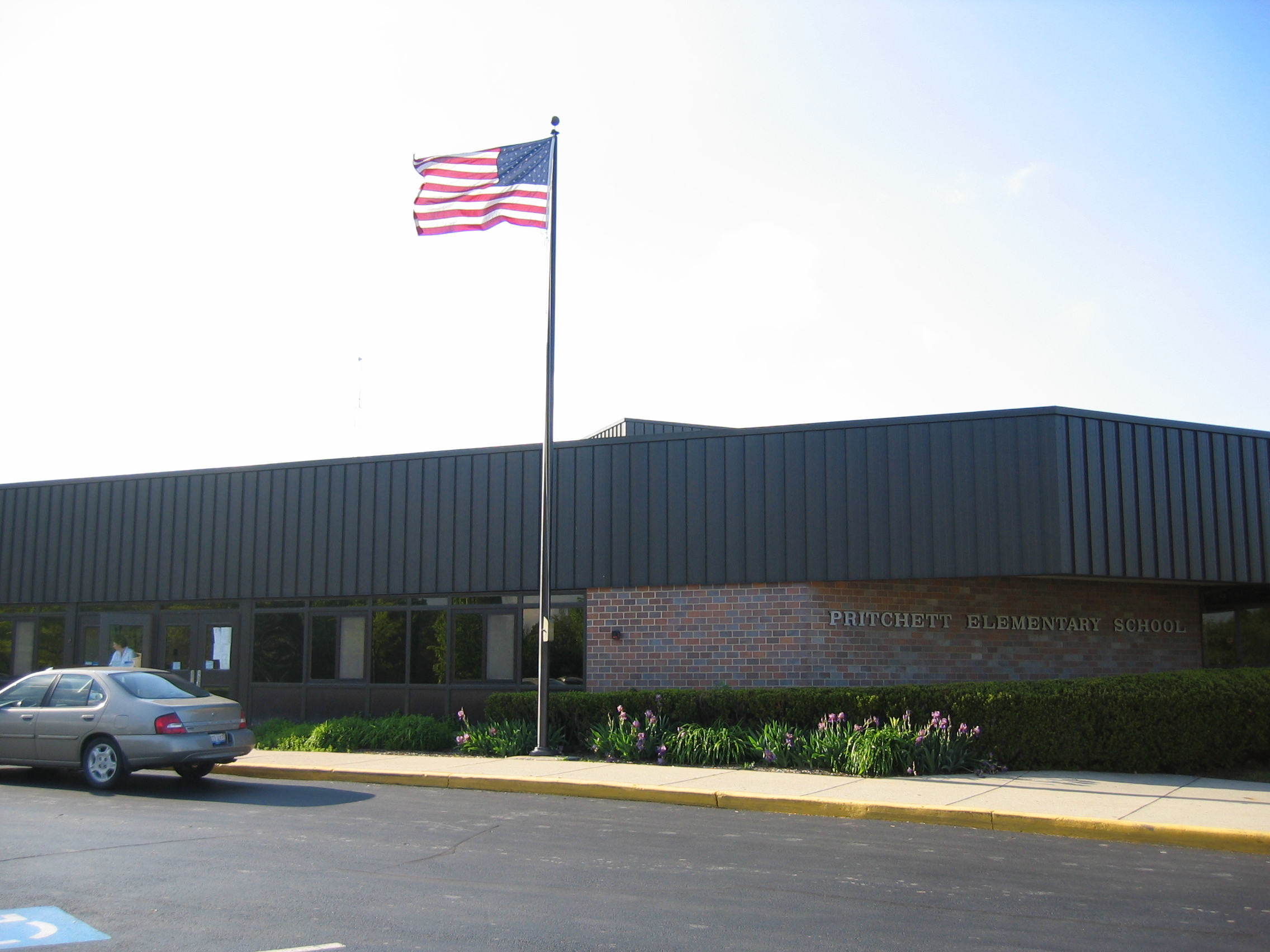
Prichett Elementary School in 2006

There are two K-3 schools, Tripp Elementary School and Pritchett Elementary School, in the district.
Pritchett Elementary School
Dr. Matt Moreland, Ed.D. - Principal
Mrs. Julie Cummings - Assistant Principal

Tripp Elementary School
Mrs. Tina Schenk - Principal
Ms. Robin vanDyke - Assistant Principal

=== Middle ===
There is one middle school for grades 4–5, which is named Meridian School. Early Childhood is also in Meridian.
Meridian School
Mr. Greg Michels - Principal
Mrs. Sadie Meyer - Assistant Principal

=== Junior High ===
The junior high school, grades 6–8, is named Aptakisic Junior High School, after Chief Half Day (Chief Aptakisic) a local Native American chief from the Potawatami tribe.
Aptakisic Junior High School
Mrs. Dana Tamez - Principal
Mrs. Nicole Koren - Assistant Principal
Mr. Kevin Locallo - Assistant Principal

Meridian and Aptakisic are both Apple-distinguished schools, due to their use of technology like iPads in class. Aptakisic is also considered one of the best middle schools in the state of Illinois.

== History ==
The district was originally split into the Aptakisic School and the Tripp School from the 19th century until the 1960s, when the school districts merged due to the city of Buffalo Grove's growth. Along with a united district came a brand-new school. Which school was new? By the 1970s, the school Which school was torn down and replaced? was unable to handle the growing city, so it was torn down and replaced by Aptakisic School. By 1981, grades K-5 began going to the new Pritchett Elementary School. In the late 1980s, Tripp Middle School was built to serve grades 3–5, at which point Pritchett served only grades K-2, and Aptakisic School was a junior high serving grades 6-8. By 1994, Meridian Middle School was built to handle grades 5 and 6, while Tripp School and Pritchett School became elementary schools serving grades K-4.

Expansion during 2017 and 2018 brought many changes. The district office that was a part of the Aptakisic School building moved to a neighboring building, with the former district office converted into sixth-grade classrooms. A new wing was built for fine arts at Aptakisic, and an early childhood wing was built for Meridian. 4th-grade classes moved from Tripp and Pritchett to Meridian, and 6th grade moved to AJHS from Meridian, making Tripp and Pritchett K-3 schools. All projects were funded by a $18 million bond, approved in 2018 by the Board of Education State, city, or county board?.

During the COVID-19 pandemic, D102 remained remote in operations and used online technology for learning. In July 2020, it was announced that students would remain in fully remote learning until Oct. 5, 2020, at the earliest. For the 2021–2022 school year, the district began operating in a hybrid capacity, with some classes fully remote, some virtual, and some a mix of the two.

In 2023, a wing designed specifically for STEM for Aptakisic was built out of half of the existing district office, and in the summer of 2024, a link was built between the school and the new wing. The link was originally announced to be located underground, but it was built above ground. In 2025, construction of a new gym, was completed at Aptakisic, as well as an expanded parking lot on the site of Aptakisic Park.

== Electives and athletics ==
Currently, schools in D102 offer Spanish, band, orchestra, and chorus as electives at AJHS, which had also offered French, but the program was terminated. In all of the elementary schools, there is a mandatory encore rotation consisting of art; music; Communication and Media Arts (CMA), a combination of acting, speechwriting, and content creation; and an engineering class, called Project: Lead The Way (PLTW). At Aptakisic, the encore rotation is mandatory for sixth grade and contains health class, engineering, CMA, and music. However, the encore rotation is optional for 7th and 8th grades and contains art class. In 8th grade, an entrepreneurship class is included in the encore rotation. If a student does not take any electives in Aptakisic, a study hall 'class' is available. Aptakisic offers many extracurriculars and sports, including, but not limited to:

- Scholastic Bowl, including NAQT
- Soccer Team
- MathCounts Club
- Basketball Team
- Badminton Club (Team)
- Geography Club
- History Club
- Debate Club
- FIRST Lego League Challenge-Robotics
- Two Jazz Bands, one audition-only.
- Rubik's Cube Club
- Track & Field
- Cross Country
- Volleyball Team
- IJAS Science Fair

For most athletics, Aptakisic competes in the Patriot Athletic Conference against Twin Groves, Woodlawn, Fremont, Daniel Wright, and West Oak, all of which feed into Stevenson High School. Most Aptakisic students consider Twin Groves (or Daniel Wright) to be their rival, as they are on the other side of Buffalo Grove.

Aptakisic sports teams have won state and nationals for a few sports, such as:

- The Track and Field team had 2 kids who made state in early 2024 & early 2025.
- The Scholastic Bowl team won NAQT nationals in 2017.

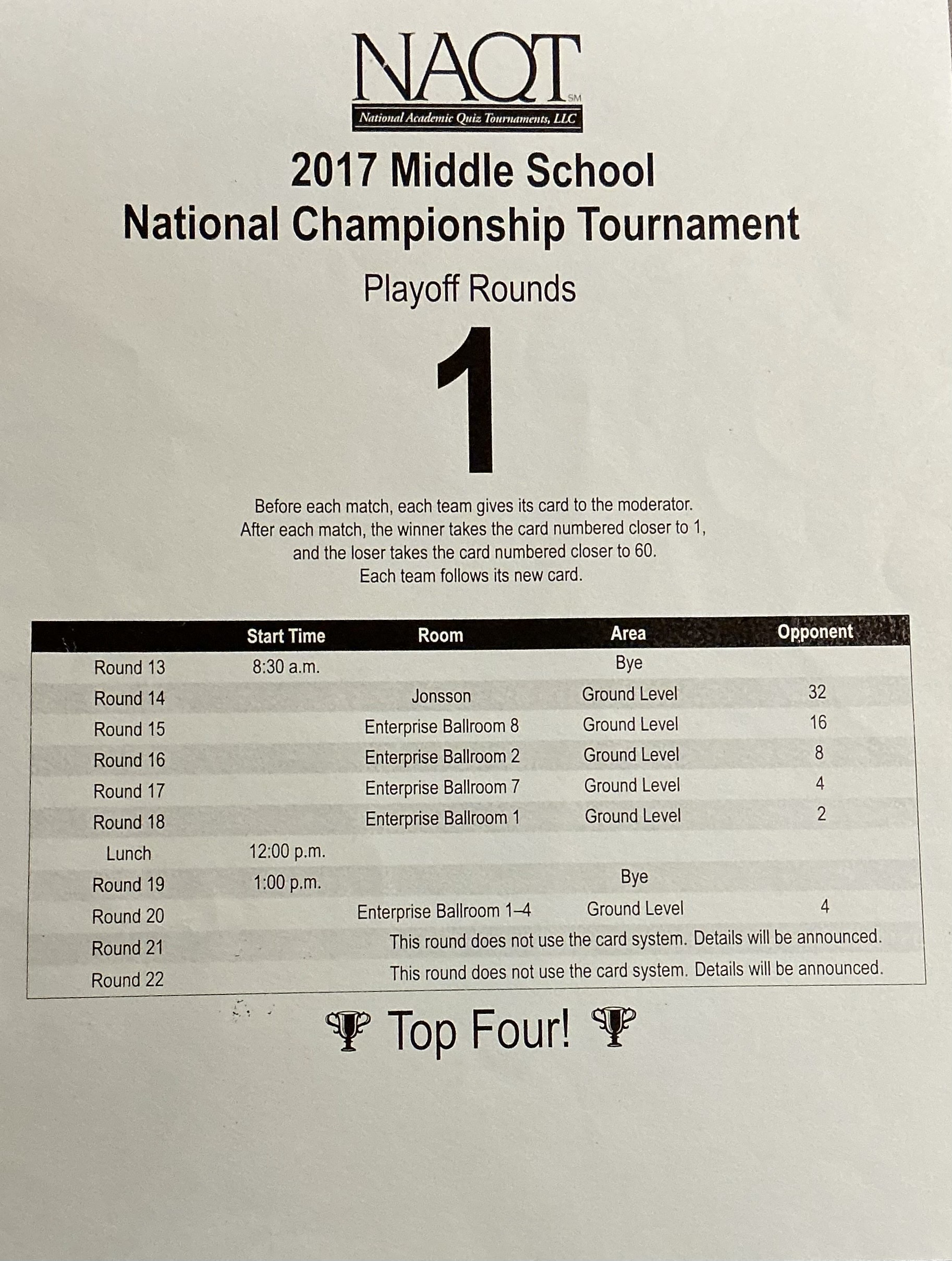
The 1 card from the 2017 NAQT MSNCT playoffs, won by Aptakisic.

In addition to all of the various electives, extracurriculars, and clubs that AJHS offers, the school offers various leadership & service opportunities. The most notable of these opportunities is National Junior Honor Society (NJHS), a service/leadership organization for 7th and 8th Graders. Students at AJHS must demonstrate leadership and service to be eligible for membership. Additionally, students must not miss more than 10% of the school year and must maintain academic integrity.

== Controversies ==
=== Stabbing incident ===
In May 2005, a student of Aptakisic was charged with the stabbing of another student in a French classroom. She was eventually sentenced to 5 years of probation, after making an apology in court.

=== Mascot change ===
In 2012, Aptakisic Junior High School changed its mascot from Chief Aptakisic to the Eagles, due to the potential for issues of racial sensitivity and backlash.

== Board of Education ==
As of 2026, the Board of Education consisted of:
Jordan Sklansky - President
Pelleg Graupe - Vice President
Anthony Q. Lee - Board Member
Laurie Kuriakose - Board Member
Justin Parker - Board Member
Melissa Rose - Secretary
Jordan Salus- Board Member

== In pop culture ==
=== Literature ===
Adam Levin's 2010 novel, The Instructions is set at Aptakisic Junior High School.
