= General Superintendent =

General Superintendent can refer to:

- There are many Christian denominations that have the office of General Superintendent. This is generally the highest elected office:
  - General Superintendent (Church of the Nazarene), the highest elected office in the Church of the Nazarene
  - General Superintendent of the Evangelical Church of Berlin-Brandenburg-Silesian Upper Lusatia
- A manager of a railroad or public transit system, senior in rank to a superintendent.
