= D102 =

D102 may refer to:

- Aptakisic-Tripp Community Consolidated School District 102, a US school district commonly referred to as D102
- D102 road, a road in Croatia
