= Buffalo Grove station =

Commuter rail station in Buffalo Grove, Illinois

Buffalo Grove

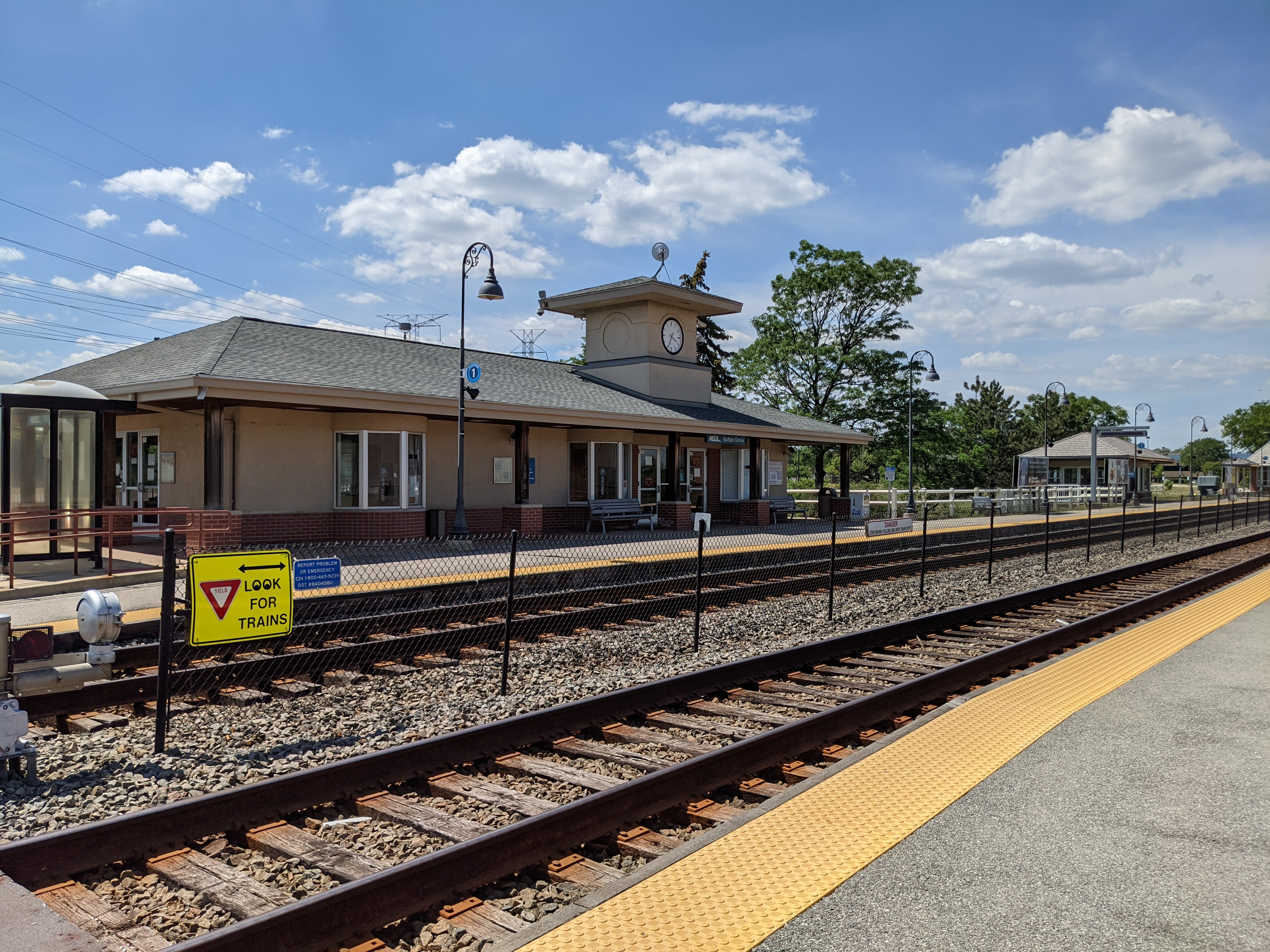
- Buffalo Grove station in June 2021

General information
- Location: 825 Commerce Court; Buffalo Grove, Illinois
- Coordinates: 42.1685°N 87.9414°W
- Owner: Metra
- Line: CN Waukesha Subdivision
- Platforms: 2 side platforms
- Tracks: 2
- Connections: Pace Buses

Construction
- Accessible: Yes

Other information
- Fare zone: 4

History
- Opened: August 19, 1996

Passengers
- 2018: 695 (average weekday) ▲17.8%
- Rank: 76 out of 236

Services
Preceding station	Metra	Following station
Prairie View toward Antioch	North Central Service	Wheeling toward Union Station
Track layout
Location

Buffalo Grove station is on Metra's North Central Service in Buffalo Grove, Illinois. The station is 32.0 miles (51.5 km) away from Chicago Union Station, the southern terminus of the line. In Metra's zone-based fare system, Buffalo Grove is in zone 4. As of 2018, Buffalo Grove is the 76th busiest of Metra's 236 non-downtown stations, with an average of 695 weekday boardings. This makes it the most-trafficked station on the North Central Service.

As of February 15, 2024, Buffalo Grove is served by all 14 trains (seven in each direction) on weekdays.

The station contains a large parking lot off of Commerce Drive, which itself is a cul-de-sac off of Deerfield Parkway. The station is a part of the Sidney Mathias Transportation Center.

== Bus connections ==
Pace

- 234 Wheeling/Des Plaines
- 272 Milwaukee Avenue North
- 626 Skokie Valley Limited
