= Wheeling station =

Wheeling station could refer to:

- Wheeling station (Illinois) in Wheeling, Illinois, United States
- Wheeling station (West Virginia) in Wheeling, West Virginia, United States
