= Stevenson High School (Lincolnshire, Illinois) =

Secondary school in the United States

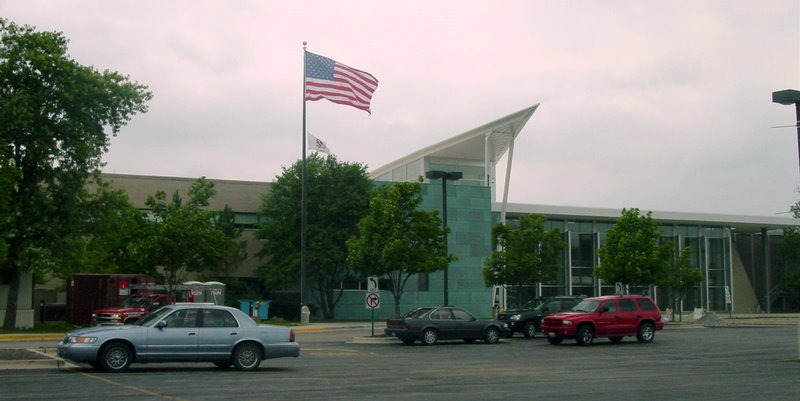

Location
- 1 Stevenson Drive; Lincolnshire, Illinois 60069; United States; 42.1993°N 87.9455°W

Information
- Type: Public
- Established: 1965
- School district: Adlai E. Stevenson High School District 125
- Superintendent: Wendy Custable
- Principal: Troy Gobble
- Faculty: 281.60 (on FTE basis)
- Grades: 9–12
- Enrollment: 4,719 (2024–25)
- Average class size: 22
- Student to teacher ratio: 16.38
- Campus size: 76 acres (31 ha)
- Campus type: Suburban
- Colors: Green and gold
- Team name: Patriots
- Publication: The Monthly Minuteman (magazine) "The Daily Digest" (newsletter)
- Newspaper: The Statesman
- Yearbook: The Ambassador
- Website: www.d125.org

Adlai E. Stevenson High School (AESHS), commonly called Stevenson High School (SHS), is a four-year public high school in Lincolnshire, Illinois, United States. It is named after Adlai Stevenson II, the 31st governor of Illinois.

== History ==
In 1964, disagreement between the district's western (Lake Zurich) and eastern (current Stevenson) sections emerged over the school's direction. Before Stevenson opened, students in the area attended Ela-Vernon High School in Lake Zurich. Stevenson was planned to be a second school for the growing district, but the district's western side (Lake Zurich) decided to build its own district. Adlai E. Stevenson High School opened in September 1965. This left Stevenson with an unfinished building, no board or administration, and no faculty. When Stevenson opened to 467 students and 31 teachers in 1965, the building was not carpeted, the library was empty, most classrooms lacked desks, and athletic fields were nonexistent, as most of the school furniture had been shipped to Prairie View, Texas, instead of Prairie View, Illinois.

In the 1980s, the release of "A Nation at Risk" and the arrival of Richard DuFour as school principal were pivotal. During the 1980s and 1990s, the school's student activities program expanded, providing over 100 clubs and teams for students. By the late 1990s, intense student competition led to the formation of a task force to solve problems like grading system manipulation. In 1992, a community referendum determined that Stevenson would remain the district's only high school, with 52% supporting this option. In 1995, Stevenson underwent its largest expansion, growing by more than 50% with a $25 million project.

Stevenson has grown to become one of the area's largest high schools. It has undergone various additions, first in 1970, when the gym and pool were renovated. Another round of remodeling occurred in the mid-1990s to accommodate the increasing student population. After the three-level east building was added in 1995, the school was more than six times its original size of 113,000 square feet. The east building included 60 classrooms, a Performing Arts Center (PAC), the Patriot Aquatic Center, Field House, and the Technology Center. Also built was a new indoor walkway ("The Link") between the west and east buildings.

In 2002, a referendum seeking an increase in the education tax rate received nearly 70% support, stabilizing the district's finances. After retiring in 2002, DuFour became a leading voice for school reform. In 2008, Education Week featured an article about Stevenson High School's implementation of professional learning community practices.

In 2004, the school's main entrance was rebuilt and transformed into a commons area now known as "The Point". Other renovations that year included more fine arts areas around the band, choir, and orchestra rooms in the west building. Around 2008, many of the athletic fields were expanded and the football field received new turf. Also in 2008, the original auditorium was renovated.

In the 2005–06 school year, Stevenson had its highest enrollment, 4,573 students. From 2005–06 to 2014–15, enrollment declined every year. In 2014–15, Stevenson had its first enrollment increase since the peak in 2005–06. Stevenson's enrollment was 4,337 in 2018–19 and surpassed 4,500 in 2020.

In 2011, the west building's library and student resource center were renovated for the first time. The project was finished in 2015 when two lecture halls were removed to make way for the Quiet Learning Center (QLC). The photography studio was renovated in 2013.

In 2019, the school added an extension to the east building, including 22 new classrooms, conference rooms, a green roof and flower garden, multiple living walls, and solar panels, with the intent of making the new addition a net-zero building.

In 2020, Stevenson began planning for an additional expansion, with new athletic courts, an artificial turf playing field, a larger running track, an area for exercise equipment, and other features to be built in the enlarged field house. This addition was finished in 2022.

== Demographics ==
In 2025, the demographics were: White: 40.8%, Asian: 44.6%, Hispanic: 8.6%, Black: 1.9%, Two or More Races: 3.6%, and American Indian: 0.4%.

== Communities served ==
The school serves students in District 125 from Lincolnshire, Long Grove, Prairie View, parts of Buffalo Grove, Mundelein, Kildeer, Hawthorn Woods, and smaller parts of Vernon Hills, Lake Zurich, Riverwoods, Bannockburn, and Mettawa.

== Feeder schools ==
All students from Aptakisic Junior High School, most students from Twin Groves Middle School, Woodlawn Middle School, and Daniel Wright Junior High School, half of West Oak Middle School students, 18% of Fremont Middle School students, and a small portion of Hawthorn Middle School South students attend Stevenson.

Name of feeder school	Name of feeder school's school district
Daniel Wright Junior High School	Lincolnshire-Prairie View School District 103
Aptakisic Junior High School	Aptakisic-Tripp School District 102
Twin Groves Middle School	Kildeer Consolidated School District 96
Woodlawn Middle School	Kildeer Consolidated School District 96
Fremont Middle School	Fremont School District 79
West Oak Middle School	Diamond Lake School District 76
Hawthorn Middle School South	Hawthorn Community Consolidated School District 73

== Controversies and incidents ==
=== Newspaper censorship ===
In November 2009, a dispute over censorship erupted between school officials and the student newspaper, The Statesman. The administration stopped publication of the November 20 issue, objecting to stories about drugs, teen pregnancy, and shoplifting. Students wanted to leave the front page blank in protest of the censorship, but officials required them to run other stories approved by the administration. On November 20, Stevenson's public information officer released a statement saying the administration did not think anonymously sourced allegations of illegal activity were fit for print.

In a November 26 editorial, the Chicago Tribune wrote that Stevenson was wrong to force students to produce administration-approved stories. "This isn't editing, it's censorship", columnist Zak Stambor wrote. The Society of Professional Journalists' Freedom of Information chairman called the censorship "immoral, un-American, irresponsible and not fit for education".

After the censorship, 11 of 14 Statesman staffers—and all the paper's top editors—resigned at the start of the spring 2010 semester.

=== Confiscation of student cellphones ===
In February 2012, the school administration initiated an investigation into cannabis sales at the school, during which the cellphones of students suspected of selling cannabis were confiscated and text messages stored on the phones were read. The American Civil Liberties Union of Illinois called the investigation a "fishing expedition"; school officials said they were "perfectly within our rights". One student was suspended for five days and barred from participating in extracurricular activities because he refused to provide his phone's password. The probe resulted in two arrests on misdemeanor drug charges.

=== Student altercations ===
In 2017, three students were put on academic suspension when a video surfaced of a student attacking another student on a bus. The student was later charged with aggravated battery in juvenile court.

=== Discrimination against Black students ===
In January 2020, dean Nick Valenziano allegedly targeted and disrespected a black Stevenson student while being recorded on video. This led to student protests and an uproar in the Stevenson community. School administrators accepted Valenziano's resignation around June 2020 and hired a diversity director to address racial issues at the school.

== Athletics ==
The Stevenson Patriots compete in the North Suburban Conference. The following is a list of sports Stevenson lists for the 2023–24 school year:

- Badminton
- Baseball
- Basketball
- Bass Fishing
- Bowling
- Cheerleading
- Cross Country
- Fencing
- Field hockey
- Football
- Flag Football
- Golf
- Gymnastics
- Ice hockey
- Lacrosse
- Patriettes (Dance squad)
- Soccer
- Softball
- Swimming
- Tennis
- Track and Field
- Volleyball
- Water Polo
- Wrestling

Stevenson High School is a member of the IHSA, the athletic teams are stylized as the Patriots. Many of its teams are top-ranked nationally and have a history of producing collegiate and professional athletes.

The following teams have won their respective IHSA sponsored state championship tournament or meets:

Sporting Achievements
Sport	Achievements	Years
Football	State Champions	2014–2015
Boys Basketball	State Champions	2014–2015
Girls Badminton	State Champions	2016–2017
Boys Gymnastics	State Champions	2001–2002, 2002–2003, 2003–2004, 2009–2010, 2014–2015
Girls Basketball	State Champions	1994–1995, 1995–1996, 2021–2022
Girls Gymnastics	State Champions	2000–2001, 2001–2002, 2002–2003, 2003–2004, 2008–2009
Girls Water Polo	State Champions	2015, 2017, 2018, 2019, 2023, 2024, 2025, 2026
Boys Bowling	State Champions	2016
Boys Water Polo	State Champions	2017, 2021, 2026
Boys Swim & Dive	State Champions	2022
Patriettes	State Champions	2017, 2020, 2021, 2024
Fencing	Midwest High School Championships	2003, 2006, 2007, 2009, 2011, 2017, 2023, 2024
Boys Ice Hockey	AHAI State Champions	2021–22
Boys Ice Hockey	National Runners-Up	2021–22
Girls Tennis	State Champions	2017

Academic Achievements
Event	Achievements	Years
Science Olympiad	National Champions	2023
Chess Team	State Champions	2007–2008, 2021–2022, 2022–2023, 2023–2024, 2025–2026
Scholastic Bowl	State Champions	1999–2000, 2004–2005, 2009–2010, 2017–2018
Debate Team	Harvard National Champions	2008, 2011, 2019
Math Team	State Champions	1991, 2023

== Awards and recognition ==
Stevenson High School is one of the only high schools in the country to receive the United States Department of Education's "Excellence in Education" Blue Ribbon Award five times. In addition, Stevenson has been named one of America's top high schools by both U.S. News & World Report and Newsweek magazines, and has been named a National School of Distinction in Arts Education by the John F. Kennedy Center for the Performing Arts.

Niche ranked Stevenson as one of the best public high schools in America in 2017. In 2016, Niche gave A+ ratings in the following areas: academics, teachers, educational outcomes, health and safety, resources and facilities, sports and fitness, co-curricular activities, food service, and administration and policies.

Several national publications have regularly included Stevenson in their lists of America's best public high schools. Stevenson was the top-ranked open-enrollment public high school in Illinois in 2021, 2015, and 2014 in U.S. News & World Report, and was the top-ranked open-enrollment school in Illinois in the Washington Post's rankings in 2014, 2013, and 2012.

In 2021, U.S. News & World Report ranked Stevenson as 171st in national rankings and 6th in Illinois.

For the class of 2016, 99.9% attended college. In 2015–2016, 360 students were named Illinois State Scholars. In addition, there were 32 National Merit Semi-Finalists in the Class of 2016 and 38 Commended students.

== Notable alumni ==
- Megan Bozek – 2014 USA women's Olympic hockey player.
- Kyle Brandt – actor and media personality.
- Jalen Brunson – NBA basketball player (point guard) for the New York Knicks, 2026 NBA Champion, 2026 NBA Finals MVP
- Tamika Catchings – former professional basketball player, WNBA champion and 2011 MVP.
- Brad Cieslak – former NFL tight end for the Buffalo Bills and Cleveland Browns.
- Kevin Frederick – former Major League Baseball pitcher for the Toronto Blue Jays.
- Dylan Geick – wrestler, writer, and social media personality
- Ron Goldman – friend of Nicole Brown Simpson and one of the murder victims from the trial of O.J. Simpson.
- Hal Gordon – unofficial mascot for the Oakland Athletics, hotdog vendor, and economist.
- Andrea Jaeger – professional tennis player, Wimbledon and French Open finalist, who became a nun.
- Paul Juda – Olympic medal winning gymnast
- Holden Karnofsky – the chief executive officer of the Open Philanthropy Project and a co-founder and board member of GiveWell.
- Joe Lando – actor, known for the television series Dr. Quinn, Medicine Woman.
- Alison La Placa – actress, known for sitcoms Duet, Open House and The John Larroquette Show.
- Drew Mormino – NFL football player for the Miami Dolphins.
- Ted Musgrave – professional stock car racing driver.
- Maema Njongmeta –NFL football player (linebacker) for the Carolina Panthers former linebacker for the Wisconsin Badgers
- Aidan O'Connell – NFL football player (quarterback) Las Vegas Raiders.
- Matt O'Dwyer – former NFL offensive guard for the New York Jets and Cincinnati Bengals.
- Mosheh Oinounou (born 1982) – former executive producer of CBS Evening News
- Danny Richmond – former professional ice hockey defenceman.
- Jennifer Ruddell (born 1978) – wheelchair basketball player
- Rex Ryan – analyst at ESPN, former NFL head coach for the New York Jets and Buffalo Bills.
- Rob Ryan – NFL assistant coach.
- Justin Smith (born 1999) – basketball player in the Israeli Basketball Premier League
- David Simon – professional basketball player in the Japanese B.League
- Gene Stupnitsky – head writer and executive producer of The Office. Television and film writer, director and producer; co-creator of Jury Duty
- Kiki Van Zanten – women's soccer player, represented Jamaica in the 2023 FIFA Women's World Cup
- Lisa Wang – rhythmic gymnast, winner of the 2007 Pan American Games.
- Andy Wozniewski – former professional hockey player.
