= Buffalo Grove, Illinois =

Village in Illinois, United States of America

- Village
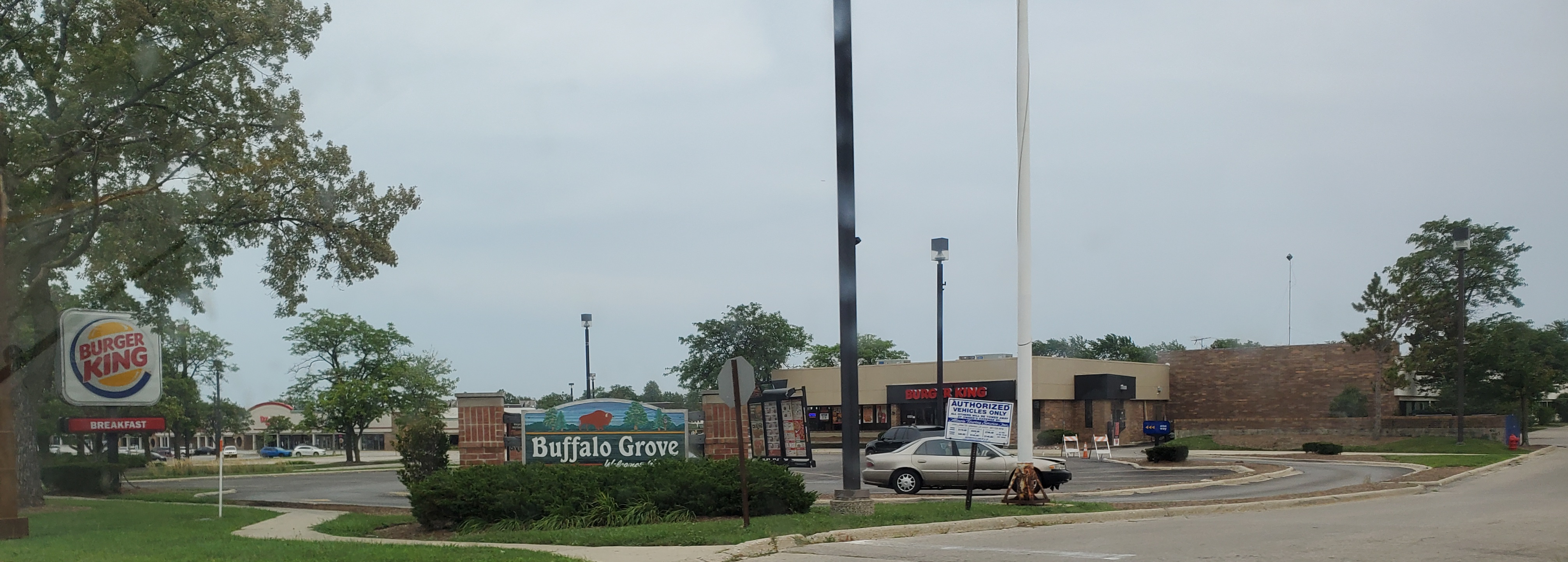
- Sign welcoming drivers into Buffalo Grove

- Flag Seal
- Interactive map of Buffalo Grove, Illinois
- Location within Chicago metropolitan area Location within Illinois Location within the United States
- Coordinates: 42°10′03″N 87°57′42″W
- Country: United States
- State: Illinois
- County: Lake and Cook
- Townships: Vernon and Wheeling
- Incorporated: 1958

Government
  - Type: Council–manager
  - Village President: Eric Smith
  - Village Board: Trustees: Lester A Ottenheimer; David Weidenfeld; Joanne Johnson; Frank Cesario; Denice Bocek; Kevin Richards

Area
  - Total: 9.58 sq mi (24.81 km^{2})
  - Land: 9.56 sq mi (24.77 km^{2})
  - Water: 0.015 sq mi (0.04 km^{2})
- Elevation: 682 ft (208 m)

Population (2020)
  - Total: 43,212
  - Density: 4,518.6/sq mi (1,744.63/km^{2})
- Time zone: UTC-6 (CST)
  - Summer (DST): UTC-5 (CDT)
- ZIP code: 60089
- Area code(s): 847 and 224
- FIPS code: 17-09447
- GNIS ID: 2397490
- Commuter rail
- Website: www.vbg.org

Buffalo Grove is a village in Lake and Cook Counties in the U.S. state of Illinois. A suburb of Chicago, it lies about 30 miles (50 km) northwest of Downtown Chicago and 20 miles (32 km) north of O'Hare International Airport. As of the 2020 Census, Buffalo Grove has a population of 43,212. It totals 9.6 square miles (25 km^{2}) of land, with the northern three-quarters in Lake County and the southern quarter in Cook County. Roads in the village, such as Lake Cook Road and Illinois Route 83, converge on I-294. It is part of the Chicago metropolitan area.

Before European colonization, Native American Potawatomi tribes inhabited the present area. The name "Buffalo Grove" comes from the English translation of the Potawatomi name for Buffalo Creek, which flows through some of the village. Initial Homesteaders sold their land to agricultural Catholic German immigrants, who established St. Mary's Church and a school. The area remained small and rural in character until housing developers began building single-family houses after the Korean War. After being incorporated in 1958, Buffalo Grove experienced a population boom for the rest of the 20th century. The village hosted a 50th Anniversary Celebration in 2008.

The village features dozens of recreational facilities, parks, and festivals, including a months-long Farmers' market, two golf courses, and the popular "Buffalo Grove Days". Buffalo Grove has an elected council-manager government with home rule status. The local government's public works department is nationally accredited. Economically, residents work in health care, education, and professional services, while businesses in the village employ 20,000 daytime workers in 10 million square feet of commercial and industrial space. The population of the village has been stagnant since the early 2000s.

== History ==
=== Prior to incorporation ===
The first inhabitants of the region were the Illinois Confederation; they comprised multiple tribes and mainly lived in central Illinois. Throughout the 1700s, the Iroquois, Potawatomi, and others invaded and eventually destroyed the confederation. The Potawatomi's success led them to inhabit areas near the present Buffalo Grove until 1833. Being the dominant group, the Potawatomi would frequently be involved in the conflicts between Europeans, such as the Beaver Wars. The first Europeans to stay the winter in what would become Chicago were the French Jesuit explorers Father Jacques Marquette and Louis Jolliet in 1673; they established trade relations with the Ojibwe. They were traveling west to find the mouth of the Mississippi River to map its entirety and to spread Christianity.

Consistent with Native American history in the United States, the tribes in Illinois were devastated by decades of war, diseases, and the ever-encroaching American settlers. The settlers caused a dwindling of food and game; in 1829, a group of Illinois River Potawatomi signed a land cession treaty that included what would become Lake County in exchange for annual delivery of $12,000 in cash and 50 barrels of salt, $12,000 in gifts, and an exclusive blacksmith shop for them. The Native Americans' efforts to remain on their land failed because of the pressure of westward migration, aided by the recent opening of the Erie Canal. They signed the 1833 Treaty of Chicago, which ceded all their lands in Illinois and Wisconsin and opened the area to white settlement. Some Native Americans who left the area would move onto reservations in western Missouri and Kansas, while others went north into Canada or resettled in northern Michigan and Wisconsin.

The first white settler in Vernon Township was Daniel Wright, who arrived in 1833 and established a cabin and crops with the help of remaining natives. The first settlers in Buffalo Grove were homesteaders from New England who received land grants from the government. They stayed for five years and sold their land to Catholic German immigrants fleeing poor living conditions. The primarily agricultural immigrants subsequently established the St. Mary's Roman Catholic Church and St. Mary's School in the 1850s; they still stand today. Buffalo Grove expanded throughout the 19th century with the additions of the first school (St. Mary's School), the Firnbach Tavern, and the Weidner General Store. The General Store served many purposes in the town, such as the post office, train ticket office, polling place, and first town telephone. Before World War II, Buffalo Grove was entirely rural, consisting of less than 150 people, mostly dairy farmers.

=== Incorporation and post-incorporation ===
All farmers eventually sold their land to developers like Al Frank, president of Buffalo Grove Home Builders Inc., who started developing his 100-acre purchase in the 1950s for World War II and Korean War veterans. The demand for single-family homes near Chicago led to a wave of "suburban settlers" in Buffalo Grove; they lived in Frank's 1,000 square foot homes. Frank was instrumental in Buffalo Grove's incorporation in 1958 because he successfully recruited many people; incidentally, most of them were related to him or working for him. He had wanted to incorporate Buffalo Grove to remove his development from Cook County city planners. The incorporated population was 164 people. The incorporation led to a population increase in Buffalo Grove, and as more developers came, the village annexed more land. Organization quickly commenced as the government created a plan commission and parks and recreation commission. Meanwhile, the government hired a professional planner to create a land-use plan, which prevented problems associated with rapid growth. Alcott School opened in 1960. In 1962, the village held its first Buffalo Days festival, and the new Buffalo Grove flag—depicting a majestic, fighting buffalo, green leaves, and gold bands—was chosen.

In the 1970s, Buffalo Grove experienced an 80 percent population growth, the third-highest rate in the northwest suburbs during the decade. The increasing population caused the village to continue to annex subdivisions such as the Highlands, Green Knolls, and Windfield and establish home rule status, thereby allowing the government greater ability to solve local problems. In addition to residential subdivisions, the Buffalo Grove Commerce Center was developed in 1981 with 50 acres of industrial park at Lake Cook Road and the Soo Line Railroad tracks. In the mid-1980s, the Corporate Grove industrial park was built to the east, and Buffalo Grove Business Park was constructed to the west. The Arbor Creek Business Center at Aptakisic Road and Barclay Boulevard, and Covington Corporate Center on Busch Road were also developed. Important buildings and organizations were completed in the 1970s, including Buffalo Grove High School, Adlai E. Stevenson High School, the park district, Indian Trails Public Library, and Vernon Area Public Library. In 1992, village representatives successfully pushed for a United States Postal Service in Buffalo Grove, the first main postal facility built in the United States in twenty years. The lack of a postal facility had many problems for residents, such as long lines, congestion, and parking hassles at the Wheeling facility. In 2006, the village became one of the first official smoke-free communities by banning smoking in public places and work environments.

== Geography ==
Buffalo Grove is a suburb of the city of Chicago, located in the extreme northeastern region of Illinois. Lake Cook Road splits Buffalo Grove into two parts: the Lake County Vernon Township portion and the Cook County Wheeling Township portion. Around three-quarters of the village is in Vernon Township. Both parts differ in their demographics and similarities with neighboring communities. Buffalo Grove shares a border with Wheeling to its southeast, Arlington Heights to its southwest and south, Riverwoods and Deerfield directly east, Lincolnshire to its northeast, Vernon Hills directly north, and Long Grove to its west and northwest. Unincorporated Prairie View is in two parts of the village. One large portion in the north includes Didier Farms, while the much smaller portion is on the Horatio Gardens subdivision just northeast of the intersection of Weiland Road and Pauline Avenue. Illinois Route 83 leads north towards central Lake County and south towards O'Hare International Airport. East–west streets can take residents east to Lake Michigan and other North Shore suburbs such as Lake Forest, Highland Park, and Glencoe.

According to the 2020 US gazetteer files, the village has a total area of 9.58 square miles (24.8 km^{2}; 2,480 ha), of which 9.563 square miles (24.77 km^{2}; 2,477 ha) is land, and 0.017 square miles (0.044 km^{2}; 4.4 ha) (or 0.31%) is water. Willow Stream Park is the largest park in Buffalo Grove at 54 acres. It includes picnic areas, handicap-accessible preschool and elementary play areas, sports fields, and bike paths. Buffalo Creek is a forest preserve located adjacent to Buffalo Grove. Before European settlement, the area featured a tallgrass prairie dotted with small wetlands and even now is a nesting spot for grassland birds, including bobolinks and eastern meadowlarks. Improvements in the 2010s include 1.7 miles of trails, seven boardwalks, two scenic overlooks, and a reservoir expansion. Buffalo Creek also functions as flood control and is built to look like a naturally occurring wetland. Buffalo Grove is in the Des Plaines River watershed.

=== Climate ===
Due to its proximity to the city, Buffalo Grove's climate shares many of the same traits as Chicago. Buffalo Grove lies in a humid continental climate zone (Köppen: Dfa) and experiences four distinct seasons. Buffalo Grove receives an average of 28.93 inches (735 mm) of precipitation each year. According to MyForecast, Buffalo Grove's record high is 104 °F (40 °C), and the record low is −24 °F (−31.1 °C). Summers are hot and humid, with frequent heat waves. July is the hottest month, and the daily average temperature is 84 °F (28.9 °C), while the daily low temperatures are around 65 °F (18.3 °C). On average, summer temperatures reach at least 90 °F (32 °C) on as many as 16 days. Winters are relatively cold and snowy, with blizzards sometimes occurring, as in 2011. There are many sunny but cold days in winter. The average winter high from December through March is about 34 °F (1.1 °C), with January and February being the coldest months; a polar vortex occurred in January 2019. Spring and autumn are mild, short seasons. Dew point temperatures in the summer range from an average of 56 °F (13.3 °C) in June to 62 °F (16.7 °C) in July. Like all Chicago suburbs, Buffalo Grove lies within USDA plant hardiness zone 5b.

Climate data for Buffalo Grove, IL
Month	Jan	Feb	Mar	Apr	May	Jun	Jul	Aug	Sep	Oct	Nov	Dec	Year
Mean daily maximum °F (°C)	28 (−2)	31.5 (−0.3)	43.3 (6.3)	54.1 (12.3)	65.8 (18.8)	75.7 (24.3)	81 (27)	79.7 (26.5)	73 (23)	59.7 (15.4)	45.5 (7.5)	34.5 (1.4)	56.0 (13.4)
Mean daily minimum °F (°C)	17.6 (−8.0)	20.1 (−6.6)	30.6 (−0.8)	39.4 (4.1)	50.5 (10.3)	59.9 (15.5)	65.8 (18.8)	64.9 (18.3)	58.1 (14.5)	46.2 (7.9)	33.6 (0.9)	24.8 (−4.0)	42.6 (5.9)
Average precipitation inches (mm)	1.57 (40)	1.61 (41)	1.77 (45)	3.35 (85)	3.66 (93)	3.54 (90)	2.95 (75)	2.8 (71)	2.24 (57)	2.56 (65)	1.54 (39)	1.34 (34)	28.93 (735)
Average snowfall inches (cm)	4.8 (12)	4.45 (11.3)	1.22 (3.1)	1.89 (4.8)	0.08 (0.20)	—	—	—	—	0.28 (0.71)	1.65 (4.2)	2.48 (6.3)	16.85 (42.8)
Source: Weather Atlas

== Demographics ==
Historical population
Census	Pop.	Note	%±
1960	1,492		—
1970	12,333		726.6%
1980	22,230		80.2%
1990	36,427		63.9%
2000	42,909		17.8%
2010	41,496		−3.3%
2020	43,212		4.1%
U.S. Decennial Census; 2010 2020

Originally incorporated with 164 people, Buffalo Grove experienced a population boom during its first few decades because of the suburban craze following World War II and the Korean War.

=== Racial and ethnic composition ===
Buffalo Grove village, Illinois – Racial and ethnic composition Note: the US Census treats Hispanic/Latino as an ethnic category. This table excludes Latinos from the racial categories and assigns them to a separate category. Hispanics/Latinos may be of any race.
Race / Ethnicity (NH = Non-Hispanic)	Pop 2000	Pop 2010	Pop 2020	% 2000	% 2010	% 2020
White alone (NH)	37,121	31,813	26,672	86.51%	76.67%	61.93%
Black or African American alone (NH)	317	405	517	0.74%	0.98%	1.20%
Native American or Alaska Native alone (NH)	16	32	36	0.04%	0.08%	0.08%
Asian alone (NH)	3,613	6,625	11,865	8.42%	15.97%	27.46%
Native Hawaiian or Pacific Islander alone (NH)	5	17	6	0.01%	0.04%	0.01%
Other race alone (NH)	44	65	115	0.10%	0.16%	0.27%
Mixed race or Multiracial (NH)	368	499	1,057	0.86%	1.20%	2.45%
Hispanic or Latino (any race)	1,425	2,040	2,854	3.32%	4.92%	6.60%
Total	42,909	41,496	43,212	100.00%	100.00%	100.00%

=== 2020 census ===
As of the 2020 census, Buffalo Grove had a population of 43,212, a 4.1% increase of 1,716 people from 2010. The median age was 42.4 years. 23.3% of residents were under the age of 18 and 17.2% were 65 years of age or older. For every 100 females there were 93.6 males, and for every 100 females age 18 and over there were 90.5 males.

100.0% of residents lived in urban areas, while 0.0% lived in rural areas.

There were 16,404 households, of which 36.5% had children under the age of 18 living in them. Of all households, 63.0% were married-couple households, 12.2% were households with a male householder and no spouse or partner present, and 21.9% were households with a female householder and no spouse or partner present. About 22.7% of all households were made up of individuals, and 10.8% had someone living alone who was 65 years of age or older.

There were 17,032 housing units, of which 3.7% were vacant. The homeowner vacancy rate was 1.0% and the rental vacancy rate was 8.7%.

=== Income and poverty ===
The educational attainment of Buffalo Grove citizens were 97.7% graduating high school, 6.3% having an associate degree, 38.1% having a bachelor's degree, and 28% having a master's degree or professional degree. The median property value for owner-occupied houses was $332,300. Median household earnings were $115,951; men's median earnings were $92,984; women's median earnings were $66,705. The poverty rate was 3.4%.

=== Religion ===
Like many other northwest suburbs, Buffalo Grove contains a large Jewish population. Jewish immigrants in the 20th century moved from Germany and Eastern Europe to Chicago, and many enjoyed economic mobility throughout the first half of the 20th century. The German immigrants tended towards Reform Judaism in America while the Russian and Hungarian immigrants usually practiced Orthodox Judaism because they stuck with traditions from home. Despite Jewish success in Chicago, the younger generation left for the suburbs. Vacant land, reasonably priced housing, and a desire for single-family housing attracted many. Their high income and improved mobility from the automobile allowed them. In 1995, the population of the northern suburbs was around ten to 25 percent Jewish, with Buffalo Grove being over 25 percent. Buffalo Grove had six synagogues in 1995. Since the 1980s, the Jewish population has declined due to less immigration to the US, low birthrate, assimilation, intermarriage, and lack of Jewish identity.

=== Demographic estimates ===
In 2011, 16% of Buffalo Grove's residents were Asian, the seventh-highest percent in Chicago suburbs. The particular Asians most represented in Buffalo Grove are Japanese Americans, Indian Americans, and Korean Americans. The schools, housing, work opportunities, religious institutions, ethnic businesses, and entertainment attract moving families. Also, NeighborhoodScout routinely ranks Buffalo Grove as one of the top 100 safest cities in the US, and some years, the top ten.

Being a suburb, Buffalo Grove attracts families looking for a good environment to raise children and avoid the downfalls of living in a city. According to the U.S. Census Bureau's American Community Survey data estimates for 2015–2019, 3.3% of households were cohabiting couples. Of all households, 28.6% had one or more people 65 years and over, and the average household size was 2.66. In the village, 41.6% spoke a language other than English at home, 32.5% of the population was aged 18 to 44 years, and 30.0% was aged 45 to 64 years.

== Economy ==
Buffalo Grove
Employment by industry in 2019
Industry	Employment	Percentage
Education and health care	4,410	19.4%
Professional, scientific, management	4,175	18.3%
Manufacturing	3,277	14.4%
Finance, insurance, real estate	2,572	11.3%
Retail trade	2,510	11.0%
Art, entertainment, recreation, food	1,335	5.9%
Wholesale trade	1,192	5.2%
Transportation, warehousing, utility	883	3.9%
Other services	733	3.2%
Construction	686	3.0%
Information	514	2.3%
Public administration	405	1.8%
Agriculture, forestry, hunting	79	0.3%
Total	22,771	100%

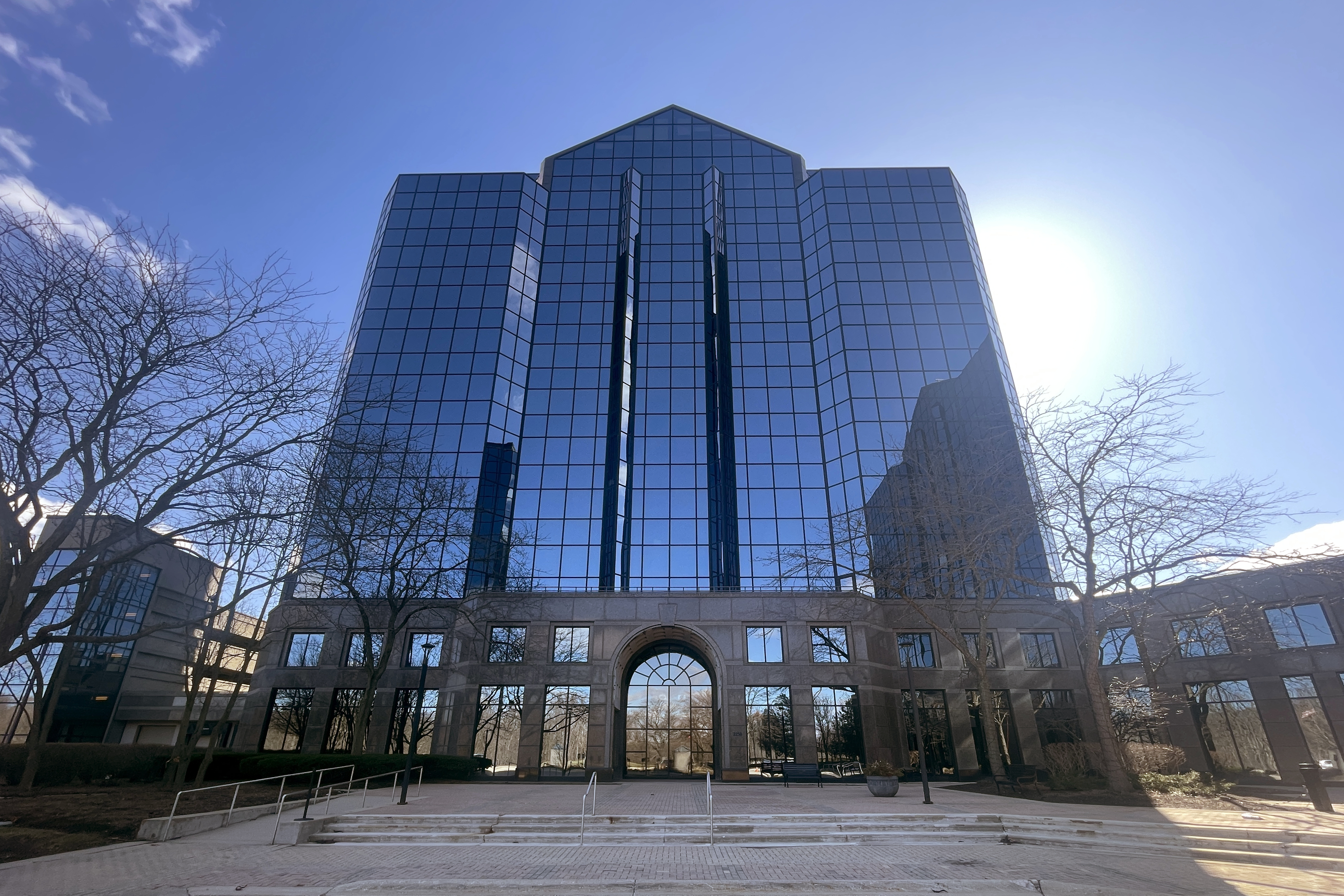
2150 E. Lake Cook Road Building, formerly the headquarters of the computer manufacturer Zenith Data Systems

The Buffalo Grove economy includes several corporate business parks, a diverse retail market, and professional services. The 20,000-day workers operate in ten million square feet of commercial and industrial space. Retail areas are Town Center, Chase Plaza, and individual businesses in smaller commercial centers. Town Center has declined since being built in the 1980s. According to consultants of the village, it lacks a theme, has little street access and walkability, and has physically deteriorated. Industrially, Buffalo Grove is stronger. In 2017, industrial property vacancy was lower than that of the Chicago metro area and the US; also, the average gross rent was double that of the area average, suggesting that demand for property was high in the village.

The village government incentivizes multiple companies to operate in the village. Because Hines Supply has been the largest sales tax generator in Buffalo Grove, the village created a tax agreement in 2000 that—after being amended a few times—will last until 2040. The agreement requires the village to rebate 60 percent of the total sales tax collected. The village also created a $7 million tax agreement to incentivize the long-awaited and popular Woodman's Markets to open in Buffalo Grove. It attracts shoppers from up to an hour away. The arrival spurred build out on Milwaukee Avenue and is part of Deerfield Parkway's 25 acres of commercial development. Other companies in tax agreements are Business IT Source Inc. and ThermFlo.

In 2015, 72.5 percent of residents were in the labor force; the unemployment rate was 3.5 percent, a little lower than Lake County's rate of 5.1 percent. Of those employed in 2015, 15.9 percent worked in Chicago, 5.7 percent worked in Buffalo Grove, and less than 4 percent in Arlington Heights, Schaumburg, and Wheeling. Around 10 percent of those employed in Buffalo Grove lived in Chicago, while 7.4 percent lived and worked in Buffalo Grove.

In 2019, the top five employers in Buffalo Grove were Siemens Building Technologies with 1,800 employees, I.S.I (business consulting) at 1,200, ESS (business consulting) at 550, Plexus Corp (an electronic parts supplier) at 370, and Veritas Document Solutions (commercial printer) at 300. Other large employers include US LBM Holdings, LLC (Hines Supply is a subsidiary), the Village of Buffalo Grove, ARxIUM, Vapor Bus International, HP Tuners, and Leica Microsystems Inc.

== Arts and culture ==
The Raupp Museum, operated by the Buffalo Grove Park District, chronicles the town's history, starting with the Potawatomi and ending at the "bustling suburb of today". In 1964, the Raupp brothers donated their land to the Park District with the wish that they make it a library or museum. Dedicated in 1979, the museum regularly receives grants from the state, allowing it to contain and preserve two permanent gallery spaces and changing exhibits while serving around 9,000 visitors a year. In 2014, the Buffalo Grove Park District opened the Community Arts Center, which houses a theater space and classrooms. The Park District's local theater company, Big Deal Productions, uses the theater.

The Buffalo Grove Town Center, a major shopping and retail destination within the village, is located at the Buffalo Grove Road and McHenry Road intersections with Lake Cook Road. It accommodates the Buffalo Grove Theater and Bowlero: a bowling, arcade, laser tag, and birthday party venue. The Town Center has struggled throughout its existence, with the original development taking 17 years and redevelopment stagnating. The Buffalo Grove Invitational Fine Arts Festival was year-round at the Buffalo Grove Town Center in mid-July, with over 30,000 visitors attending on average. The last festival occurred in 2011.

The village is home to St. Mary's Church, founded in the 1850s by the Catholic population, and originally made up of ten members. The second church burned and was replaced by the current main structure in 1899. An expansion was undertaken in 1979 to construct a new sanctuary abutting the previous building. Throughout the 1960s and 1970s, the community worshipped in the school's chapel. The Gothic architecture contains miniature spires, wood tending, and stained windows which tower above the surrounding country. Buffalo Grove had six synagogues in 1995.

=== Annual cultural events ===
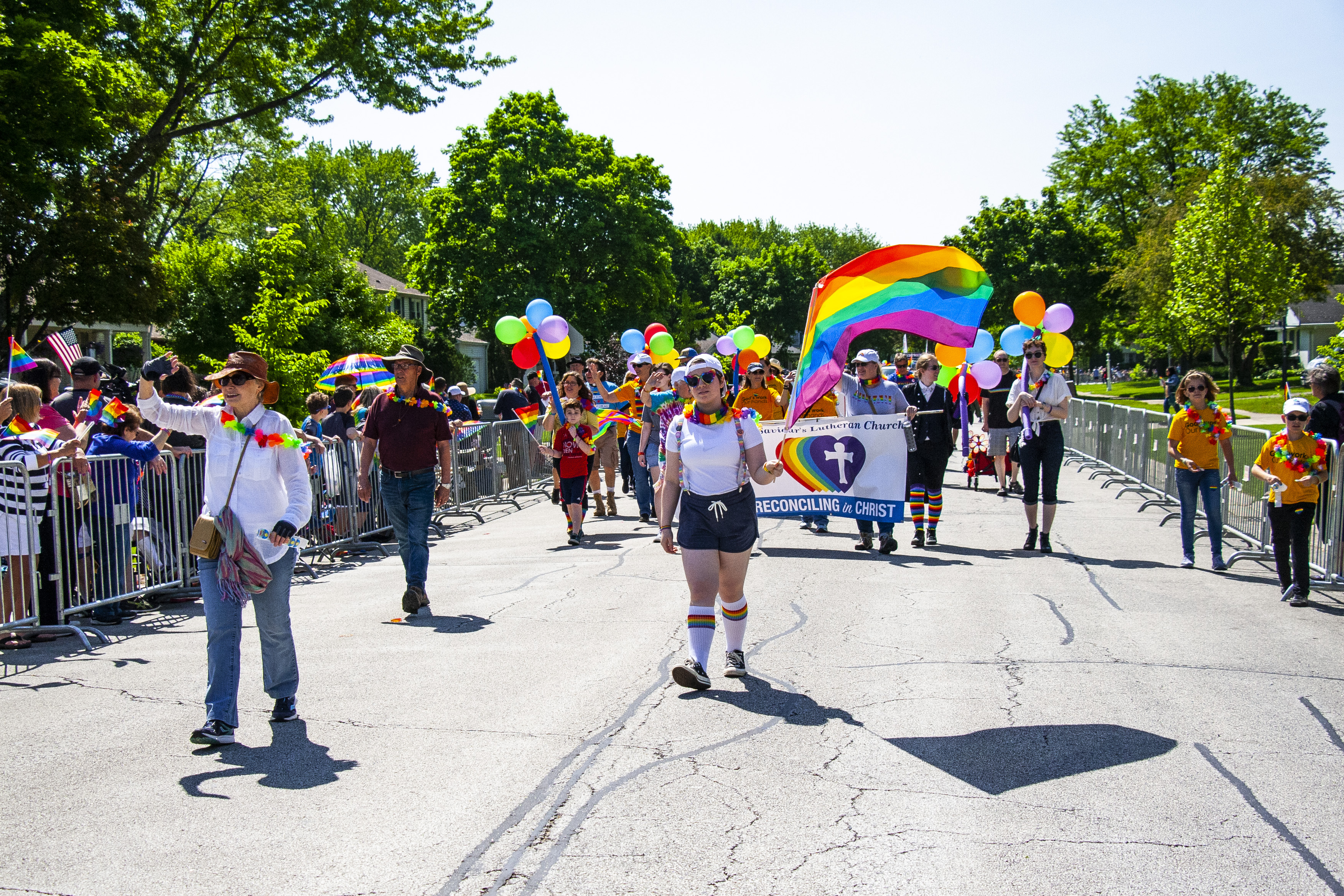
2019 pride parade

Buffalo Grove holds approximately ten events throughout the year, the largest being Buffalo Grove Days in September. The multi-day festival occurs at Mike Rylko Community Park, 951 McHenry Road., located on the east side of McHenry/Route 83, between Buffalo Grove Road and Deerfield Parkway, next to the Spray 'n' Play waterpark. It features carnival games, roller coaster rides, arts and craft booths, food vendors, live music, and a parade held at the beginning of the festival. The festival usually attracts residents from Buffalo Grove and neighboring communities. Another prominent event is the Farmers' Market, also held at Mike Rylko Community Park. It lasts every Sunday morning from June to October, presenting "locally grown fruits, vegetables, condiments, gourmet coffee and pastries, and more". In addition, businesses sponsor booths while non-profits showcase local organizations and businesses.

On June 2, 2019, Buffalo Grove held its inaugural pride parade, organized by the Pinta family, and has continued hosting annually. Other events and programs in Buffalo Grove include Rotary Village Green concerts, Lawn Chair Lyrics, Movies Under the Stars, Green Fair, Buffalo Grove Symphonic Band, Buffalo Grove Singers, National Night Out, Fourth of July Fireworks, and Golf at Buffalo Grove and Arboretum Golf Courses.

=== Libraries ===
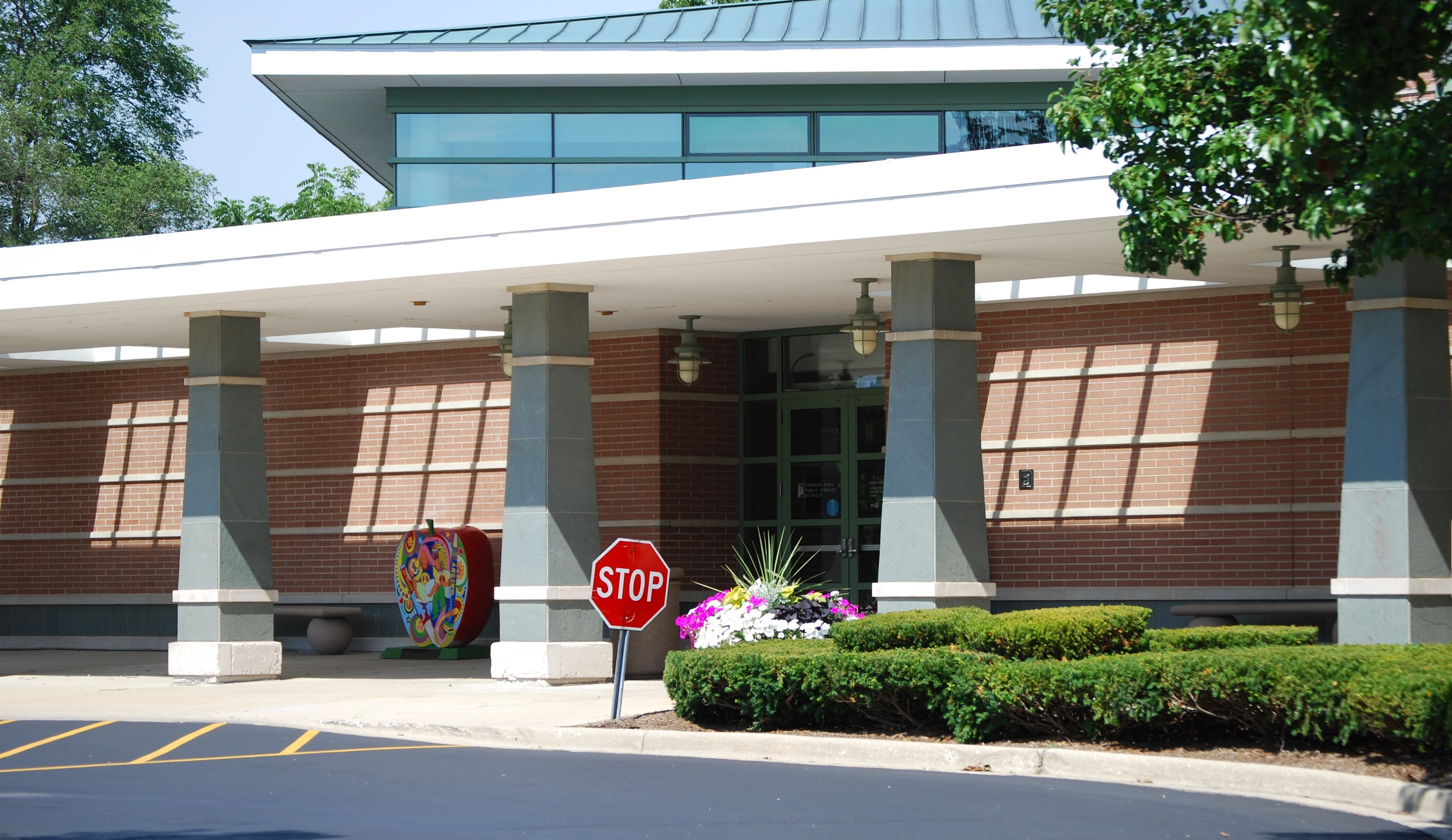
The Vernon Area Library, located just east of the border in neighboring Lincolnshire.

The Indian Trails Public Library District serves all of Buffalo Grove in Cook County and a small portion in Lake County It is located in Wheeling, south of the intersection of Dundee Road and Schoenbeck Road. The library has renovated, moved, and changed multiple times since it began in a 20-foot by 30-foot frame building and held fewer than 13,000 items in its collection. In 2009, the one-millionth item was checked out from the library.

The Vernon Area Public Library District serves most of the Lake County part of Buffalo Grove. The library is located in Lincolnshire. The Vernon Area Public library began in 1974 in a classroom in the Adlai Stevenson High School and later moved to a temporary building in the high school parking lot. The first permanent library building was at 4 Indian Creek Road in Lincolnshire. On March 20, 1990, voters approved a referendum to sell $6.9 million in bonds to construct a new library adjacent to the existing library building. On September 15, 1993, the Vernon Area Public Library opened at 300 Olde Half Day Road in Lincolnshire. In 2019, the total collection use was 1,092,622.

== Sports and recreation ==
Buffalo Grove has an extensive collection of parks and natural open spaces. Nicole Park is north of Old Checker Road along Arlington Heights Road and contains a playground and open space. It is named after a 10-year-old girl who died in a nearby reservoir. Willow Stream Park along Old Checker Road serves the village with sports fields and courts, a pool, playground, and large open grass areas. Mike Rylko Community Park is home to the fairs and events mentioned above, and Buffalo Grove Fitness Center is north of Willow Stream; both feature similar amenities to Willow Stream. South of Lake Cook Road is Emmerich Park (named after a soldier), home to the Buffalo Grove Park District and where BGRA (mentioned below) plays many games. In total, Buffalo Grove has dozens of parks. In addition to parks, Buffalo Grove has 43 miles of paths and sidewalks in Buffalo Creek Trail, Des Plaines River Trail, and Cook County Forest Preserve District.

The non-profit corporation Buffalo Grove Recreation Association (BGRA), not affiliated with the park district, provides a youth baseball league for the community. Founded in 1961, BGRA's 1,500 players and 600 volunteers participate in House Baseball (for anyone), Travel Baseball (try out), and Buddy Baseball. Buddy Baseball pairs children who have physical, intellectual, and/or emotional disabilities with non-disabled buddies to help them play baseball.

Buffalo Grove has two golf courses and one indoor golf facility. The Buffalo Grove Golf Course is one of the largest open spaces within the village. Utilized as a floodplain, the course both functions as enjoyment and civil infrastructure. The Arboretum Club, which opened in 1990, is an 18-hole course. Lastly, the park district's 100 by 60-yard Golf Dome has a 75-yard driving range, putting green, and hitting stations.

Multiple notable athletes have originated from Buffalo Grove. Felice Herrig, a native of Buffalo Grove, is a kickboxer, Muay Thai fighter, and mixed martial artist. In 2021, she was No. 15 on the UFC women's strawweight rankings. Zach Borenstein had a .524 batting average as a senior at Buffalo Grove High School and subsequently played at Eastern Illinois University and multiple minor league teams. Andy Wozniewski, a former ice hockey player for the Toronto Maple Leafs and other teams, including Team USA at the Deutschland Cup, was born in Buffalo Grove. Brett Lebda, ice hockey defenseman for multiple teams, including the Toronto Maple Leafs, attended Buffalo Grove High School. Buffalo Grove native Megan Bozek is an ice hockey player who plays for the KRS Vanke Rays and the United States national team. Finally, Olympic figure skater Bradie Tennell trained most of her life at Twin Rinks in Buffalo Grove. She is a 2018 Olympic team event bronze medalist, the 2020 Four Continents bronze medalist, the 2018 CS Autumn Classic champion, the 2018 CS Golden Spin of Zagreb champion, and a two-time US national champion (2018, 2021).

== Government ==
The government of Buffalo Grove is a council-manager form of government with elements of home rule, gained in 1980. The village president and six trustees with four-year terms lead the government. The daily functions of the village are carried out by an appointed village manager whose job includes attracting new businesses, presenting an annual budget, and much more. According to the village, the village manager's function "is similar to that of a general manager in a multi-division service organization". Accordingly, the village manager, Dane Bragg, received a $267,310 salary in 2019 plus a $15,000 bonus.

In 2021, the village expected $107 million in revenues to support $113 million in expenditures. Fire Department and Police pensions and Illinois Municipal Retirement Fund were the steepest expenditures, totaling around $7 million. In 2017, the biggest revenue sources were taxes at 58 percent (property taxes were largest at 34 percent) and intergovernmental revenues at 27 percent. The sales tax rate for Cook and Lake County is 10 percent and 8 percent. Also, the tax rate on food and beverages sold at restaurants in the Cook County portion of Buffalo Grove is 11 percent (10 percent for sales tax and 1 percent for food and beverage tax), while in Lake County, the same tax on food sold at restaurants is 9 percent. Budgeted employment in 2018 for Police, Fire, Public Works, Golf, and Administration was 260 people.

Illinois Democratic Senator Adriane Johnson is a resident of Buffalo Grove. Appointed in 2020 following Terry Link's resignation, she represents part of Buffalo Grove and serves on Buffalo Grove Park Board. An Illinois Senator who represents Buffalo Grove is Democrat Julie Morrison in the 29th state senate district. In the Illinois House of Representatives, Democrats Daniel Didech and Tracy Katz Muhl represent the 59th and 57th districts respectively. Nationally, Democrat Brad Schneider represents Lake County Buffalo Grove in the 10th Congressional District, and Democrat Raja Krishnamoorthi represents Cook County and Buffalo Grove in the 8th Congressional District. Former Buffalo Grove Village Presidents Verna L. Clayton and Sidney Mathias served in the Illinois House of Representatives.

== Education ==
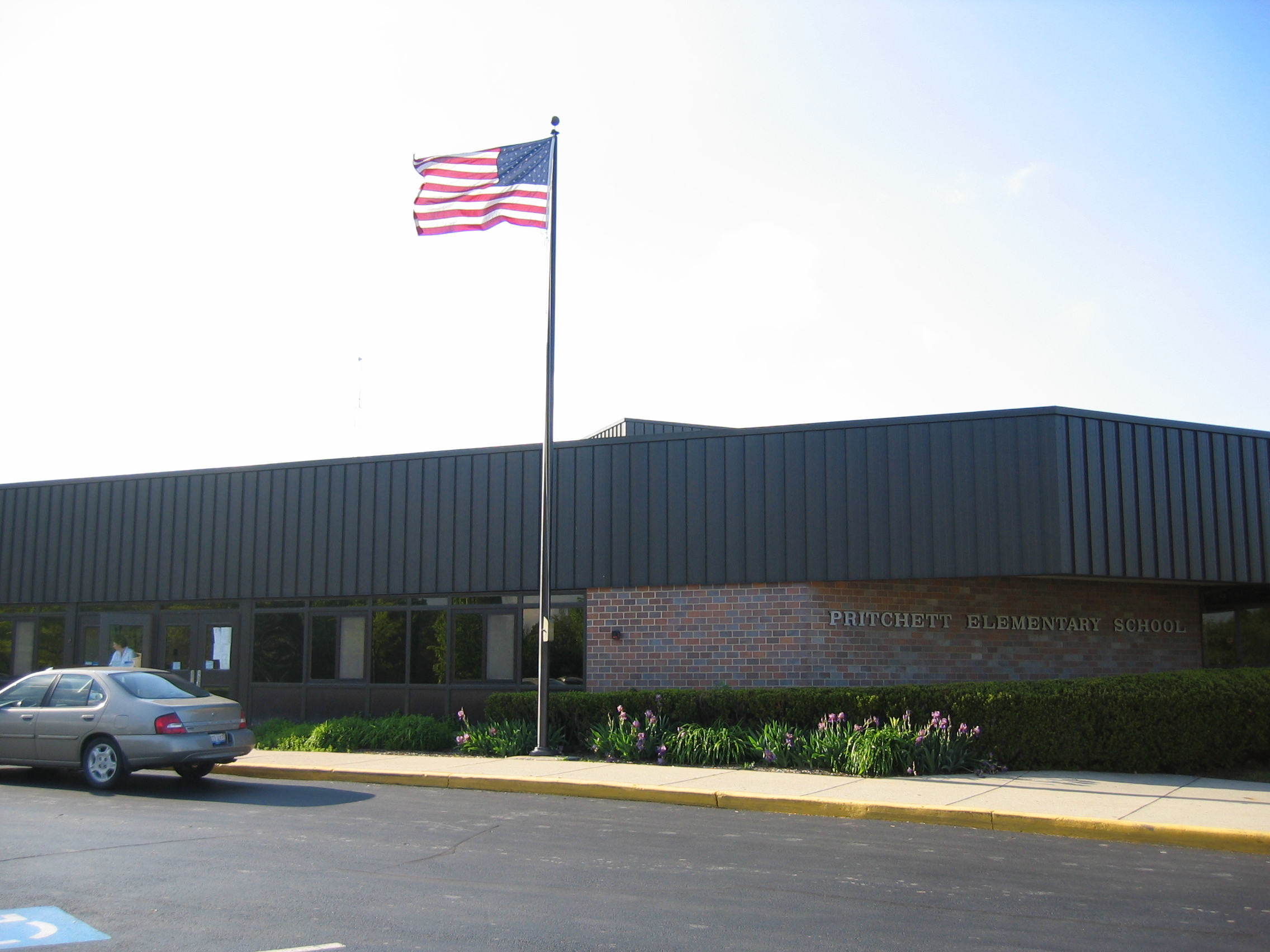
Pritchett Elementary School

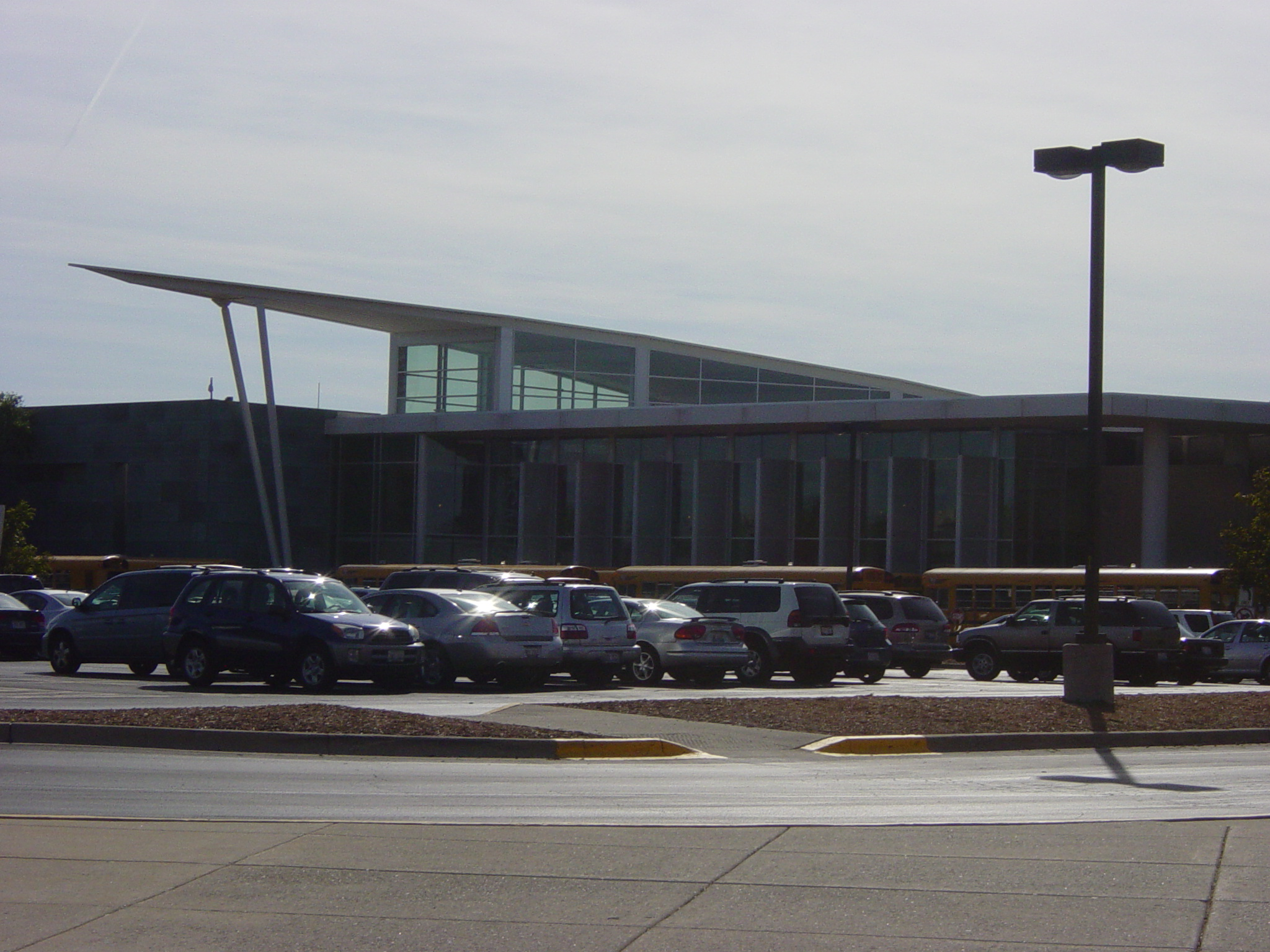
Adlai E. Stevenson High School

Buffalo Grove has four private schools, over ten public schools, and one public high school. Students in the Lake County part of the village attend either Aptakisic-Tripp Community Consolidated School District 102, Lincolnshire-Prairie View School District 103, or Kildeer Countryside Community Consolidated School District 96, while students in the Cook County part attend Wheeling Community Consolidated School District 21. High school students in the Lake County portion of Buffalo Grove attend Stevenson High School in nearby Lincolnshire, whereas Cook County students attend Buffalo Grove High School, located in the Cook County part of the village.

The three districts that take students from Buffalo Grove have different histories. Since the 1840s, schools serving Buffalo Grove have changed in response to the growing community. They were consolidated in 1955 under the name Aptakisic-Tripp Community Consolidated School District 102. The first school to open in Buffalo Grove was the Alcott School in 1961—now the Alcott Center—in response to growth on the Cook County side (a different district Aptakisic-Tripp). The first year had 52 first-graders and six sixth graders. To support the rapidly growing village, the district held referendums and successfully built Pritchett Elementary School, Tripp School, and Meridian School in the 1980s. To accommodate the continued increase in population, the district changed the configuration of the grades in the schools in 2018. Buffalo Grove High School's district (Township High School District 214) almost did not pass the referendum because women's votes were not counted immediately; the referendum was eventually successful.

== Infrastructure ==
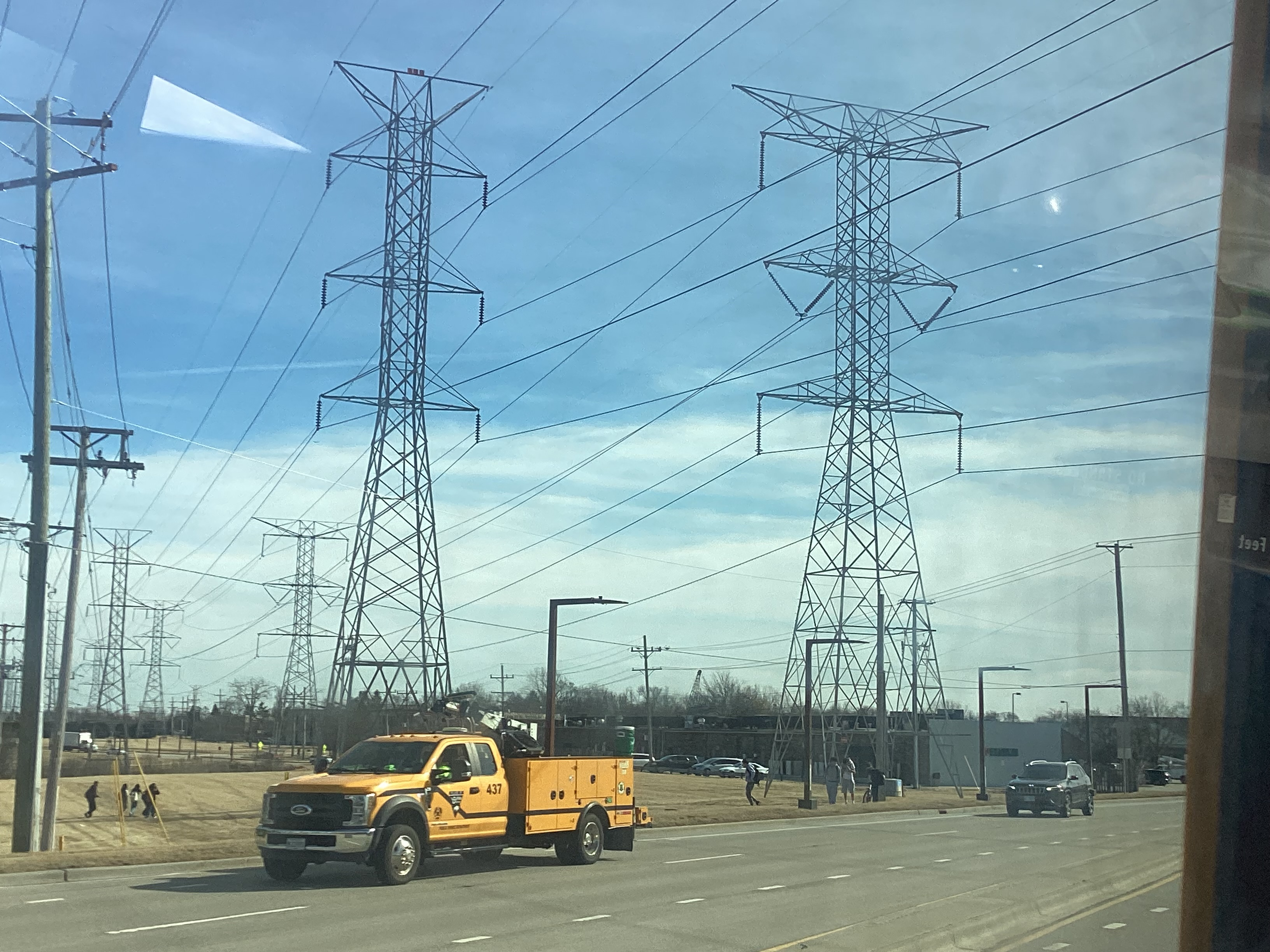
Power lines in Buffalo Grove

Buffalo Grove relies on multiple arterial roads. Going north-south, drivers use Milwaukee Avenue (Illinois Route 21) on the east side of the village, Buffalo Grove Road and Weiland Road down the center, and Arlington Heights Road on the west side of Buffalo Grove. Going east-west, drivers use Dundee Road (Illinois Route 68) in south Buffalo Grove, Lake Cook Road and Deerfield Parkway in the center, and Aptakisic and Half Day Road (Illinois Route 22) in the north. McHenry Road (Illinois Route 83) acts as a diagonal road in the village by going north–south and east–west. O'Hare International Airport is approximately 20 miles (32 km) south of Buffalo Grove. Because of Lake Cook Road, the village has access to the Interstate Highway system (I-90, I-94, and I-294).

=== Pace ===
Pace provides bus service on the 234, 272, and 626 bus routes at the Buffalo Grove Metra station.

=== Metra ===
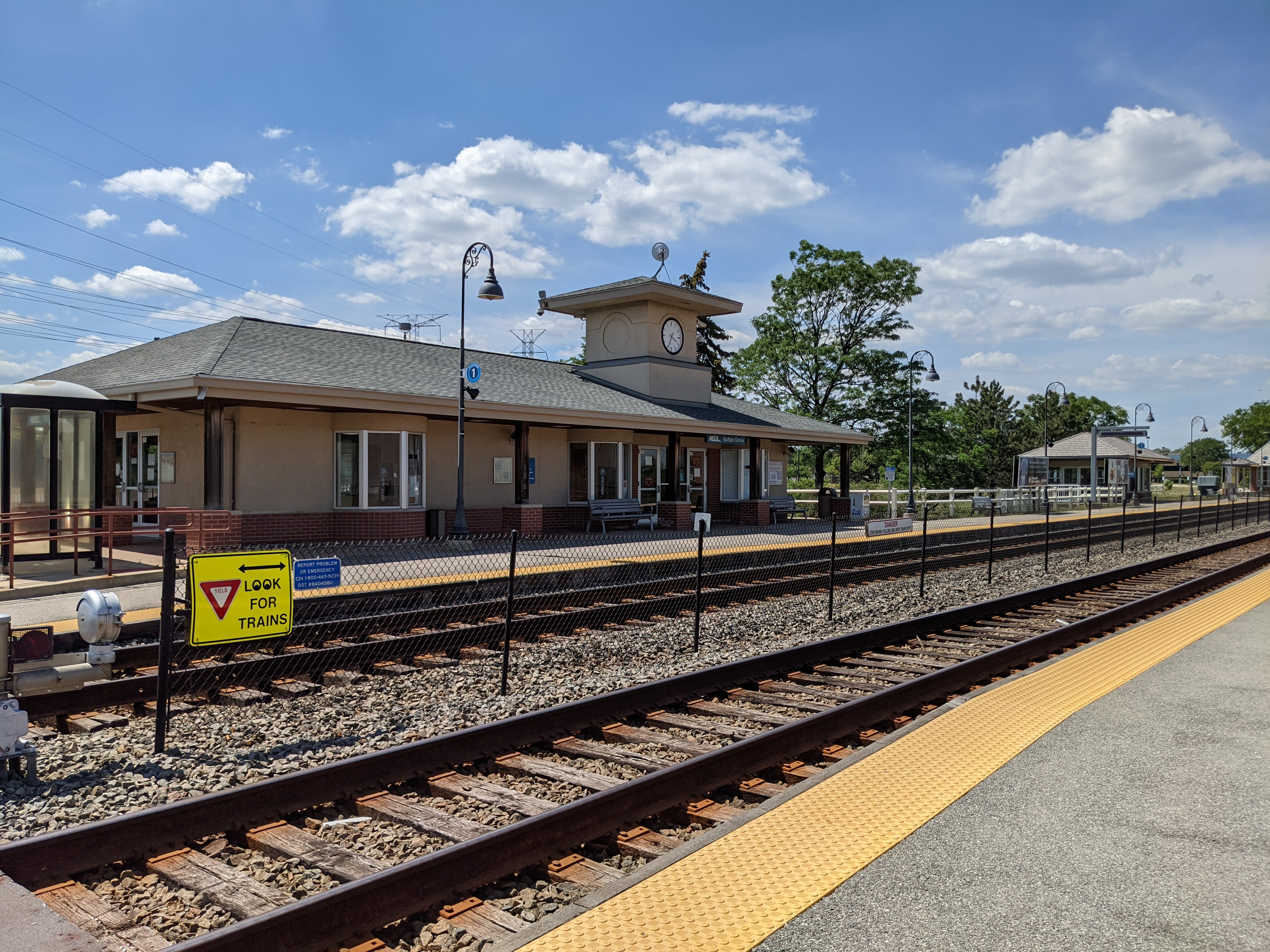
Buffalo Grove station in June 2021.

Since its creation in 1996, the Buffalo Grove station has operated on Metra's North Central Service, which provides daily commuter rail service between Antioch and Chicago's Union Station. The station is 32 miles (51 km) away from the southern terminus of the line, Union Station. In Metra's zone-based fare system, Buffalo Grove is in zone F. As of 2018, Buffalo Grove is the 76th busiest of Metra's 236 non-downtown stations, with an average of 695 weekday boardings, making it the most trafficked station on the North Central Service. The train station is just east of the intersection of Weiland Road and Deerfield Parkway.

The Prairie View station is north of Half Day Road (IL Route 22) and Prairie Road's intersection, and it is also used by Buffalo Grove residents. Located along the eastern boundary of the village, the station is 34.4 miles (55.4 km) away from Union Station. Prairie View is in zone G. As of 2018, Prairie View is the 113th busiest of Metra's 236 non-downtown stations, with an average of 415 weekday boardings. The North Central Service runs primarily during rush hour, but not on the weekends and few holidays; instead, Buffalo Grove residents must use the Arlington Heights Metra Station, the Deerfield Metra Station, or the Lake Cook Road Metra Station.

=== Utilities ===
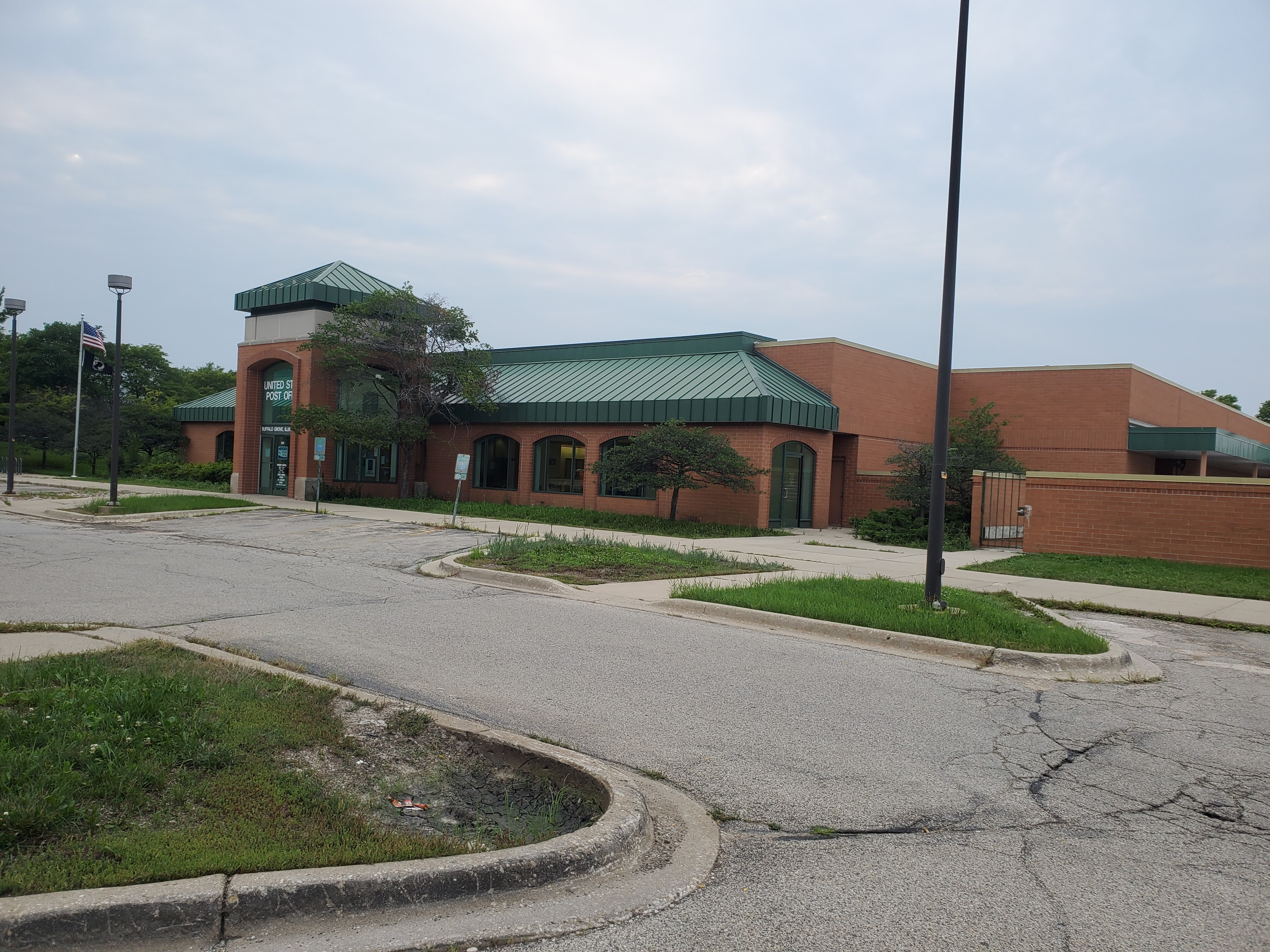
Buffalo Grove Post Office

Water in Buffalo Grove is from Lake Michigan, and Commonwealth Edison provides electric power. The village purchases water from the Northwest Water Commission and controls the distribution of water. It travels through four pumping stations and 181 miles of underground water main. Also, Buffalo Grove flushes hydrants, plows streets, and repairs faulty water meters of private residents. There is a Stormwater Utility Fee for Buffalo Grove owning and maintaining the Stormwater Management System, composed of storm sewers, creeks, waterways, and detention areas.

Buffalo Grove operates on an exclusive contract with Waste Management, Inc. for solid waste disposal. This contract includes "At Your Door (AYD) Service," which allows a pick-up of hazardous and difficult-to-recycle materials, such as electronics, televisions, paint, and chemicals. In 2004, the Village of Buffalo Grove Public Works Department received national accreditation from the American Public Works Association, the second agency to earn recognition in Illinois.

== Notable people ==
Several actors, actresses, and musicians are from Buffalo Grove. Aaron Himelstein, the actor who played younger Austin Powers in Austin Powers in Goldmember, moved to Buffalo Grove when he was three. Vince Vaughn was raised in Buffalo Grove. Jessy Schram, an actress who was born and raised in Buffalo Grove, played Cinderella in the TV series Once Upon a Time. Mike Kinsella, a musician in American Football and Cap'n Jazz, grew up in Buffalo Grove. His brother, Tim Kinsella, was a musician in Joan of Arc and a member of Cap'n Jazz. Raymond Benson, an author of some James Bond novels, lives in the village. Rob Sherman, an atheist activist, perennial candidate and businessman, lived in Buffalo Grove for 32 years. Olympic judoka Irwin Cohen was from Buffalo Grove, as is his son judoka Aaron Cohen. Ronald Goldman, a victim in the O. J. Simpson murder case, grew up in Buffalo Grove. Serbian-American soccer player Stefan Antonijevic was born in Buffalo Grove.

== See also ==
- U.S. Music Corporation
- Convia
- Eagle Test Systems
