= Diamond Lake School District 76 =

School district in Illinois, United States

Address
- 26156 N. Acorn Lane Mundelein, Illinois, 60060; United States

District information
- Grades: PreK-8
- Superintendent: Dr. Bhavna Sharma-Lewis

Other information
- Website: Official website

Diamond Lake School District 76 is a PK-8 school district centered on the village of Mundelein, Illinois, which is located in central Lake County. The district mainly feeds into Mundelein High School in Mundelein, Illinois with some students feeding into Adlai E. Stevenson High School in Lincolnshire, Illinois after the eighth grade. The Mundelein district is composed of three schools: one elementary school, one intermediate school, and one middle school.

The elementary school, Diamond Lake School, educates those in kindergarten, first grade, second grade, and also upholds a prekindergarten program; the principal of the school is Dr. Erica Berger. The mascot is a Cub.

Diamond Lake School students move on to attend West Oak Intermediate School for grades three through five; the principal is Mr. Matthew Freiburger, and the mascot of the school is the Wolf.

The school that educates the eldest of the district students is called West Oak Middle School, serving grades six through eight. The principal of West Oak is Mr. Brandon Pederson, and the mascot is the Wolfpack.

West Oak Middle School runs a choir program and a band program; the school also runs two jazz bands, Jazz I and Jazz II.
