= Superintendent =

Superintendent may refer to:

- Building superintendent, a manager, maintenance or repair person, custodian or janitor, especially in the United States; sometimes shortened to "super"
- Prison warden or superintendent, a prison administrator
- Soprintendenza - organisation associated with the Ministry of Culture (Italy)
- Superintendent, a character in Halo 3 ODST
- Superintendent (Christianity), a church executive performing the duties of a bishop, in Lutheran and Methodist churches
- Superintendent (construction), a supervisor who is responsible for scheduling subcontractors on behalf of the general contractor
- Superintendent (education), an education executive or administrator
- Superintendent (New Zealand), the elected head of each Provincial Council in New Zealand from 1853 to 1876
- Superintendent (police), Superintendent of Police (SP), or Senior Superintendent of Police (SSP), a police rank
- Superintendent (United States Air Force), a United States Air Force position
