= Kildeer Countryside Community Consolidated School District 96 =

School district in Illinois, United States

Address
- 1050 Ivy Hall Lane Buffalo Grove, Illinois, 60089; United States

District information
- Superintendent: Kathryn E. Sheridan

Other information
- Website: Official website

Kildeer Countryside Community Consolidated School District 96 is a K-8 school district centered in the Lake County village of Long Grove, Illinois, a suburb of Chicago. This district is composed of seven schools in total: one kindergarten center, four elementary schools, and two middle schools. Students attending schools in District 96 will ultimately attend Adlai E. Stevenson High School in Lincolnshire, Illinois. This district's kindergarten center is known as Willow Grove Early Learning Center, which serves kindergarteners and early childhood students. Ivy Hall Elementary School, Prairie Elementary School, Country Meadows Elementary School, and Kildeer Countryside Elementary School educate grades 1-5. Woodlawn Middle School and Twin Groves Middle School serve grades 6–8. After graduating, students will go to Stevenson High School. The mascot of Woodlawn Middle School is the wolf, while the mascot of Twin Grove Middle School is the colt; in the elementary schools, the cougar is the mascot of Kildeer Elementary, the wildcat is the mascot of Ivy Hall Elementary, the cub is the mascot of Country Meadows Elementary, and the puma is the mascot of Prairie Elementary. Willow Grove's mascot is Buddy the Bear.

In March 2007, five District 96 schools were selected by the Chicago Sun-Times as five of fifty of the best suburban schools in Chicago metropolitan area: Ivy Hall Elementary School, Prairie Elementary School, Kildeer Countryside Elementary School, Twin Groves Middle School, and Woodlawn Middle School. The former three listed were chosen as some of the fifteen best public schools in the county by Chicago Magazine in October 2006. In October 2007, Twin Groves was also certified as an official Blue Ribbon school. Woodlawn Middle School, in the 2009-2010 school year, also got a Blue Ribbon Award. Also, during the 2012–2013 school year, Kildeer Countryside Elementary School received a Blue Ribbon award.

== History ==
The district was formed in the wake of World War II in 1946. Four one-room schoolhouses in the then-rural southern Lake County area that initially served as independent districts were consolidated into one.

Up to 1999, students in District 96 attended one of three elementary schools, Prairie, Kildeer, or Willow Grove, before graduating and converging into Ivy Hall Middle School (5-6) and Twin Groves Junior High (7-8) for their last four years in the district. At this time, however, the school district worked to expand its capacity and therefore constructed the newer Woodlawn Middle School, as well as the Country Meadows Elementary School. A reorganization effort also designated another structure as part of the district to educate kindergarteners; this separate building is now known as Willow Grove Early Learning Center.

Since 1993, four school referendums have been passed; three pertain to the money that fueled the construction and additions of the Woodlawn, Country Meadows, and Willow Grove facilities, while the other referendum involved a separate fund to improve the schools already in the district. This referendum, alongside contributions by school-localized Parent-Teacher Organizations, have made possible a purchase of new learning apparatus that can be utilized for the students' benefit.

== Administration ==
The district’s superintendent is Mrs. Kathryn E. Sheridan.

=== Principals ===
- Jennifer Smith of Willow Grove Early Learning Center
- Mike Senatore of Ivy Hall Elementary School
- Lauren Delahanty of Prairie Elementary School
- Aska Lempke of Country Meadows Elementary School
- Karen L. Cumpata of Kildeer Countryside Elementary School
- Jessica Barnes of Twin Groves Middle School
- Gregory Grana of Woodlawn Middle School
