= Cudahy station =

Historic railroad station in Wisconsin

Cudahy
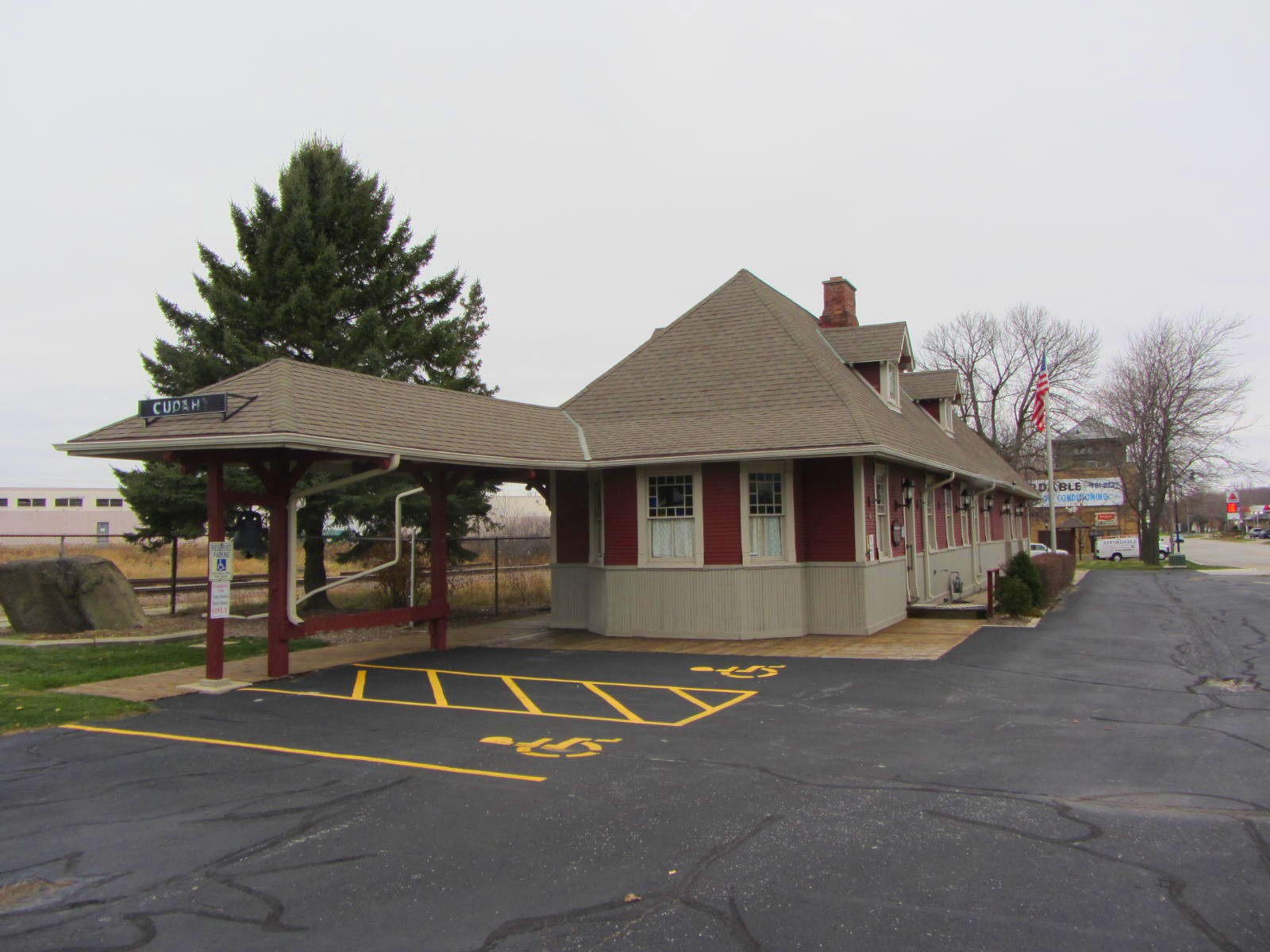

General information
- Location: 4647 South Kinnickinnic Avenue, Cudahy, Wisconsin 53110
- Line: Kenosha Subdivision
- Platforms: 2 side platforms
- Tracks: 2

History
- Opened: 1892
- Rebuilt: 1893

Services
Preceding station	Chicago and North Western Railway	Following station
National Avenue toward Milwaukee	Milwaukee Division	South Milwaukee toward Chicago
- Cudahy Chicago and North Western Railway Depot
- U.S. National Register of Historic Places
- Location within Wisconsin Location within the United States
- Coordinates: 42°57′36″N 87°51′52″W
- Area: 1 acre (0.40 ha)
- Built: 1893
- Architect: Berry, J.B., Engineer's Office Wisconsin and Galena Divisions
- Architectural style: Queen Anne
- NRHP reference No.: 13000750
- Added to NRHP: September 18, 2013
Location

The Cudahy Depot is a historic railroad station built in 1893 by the Chicago and Northwestern Railway in Cudahy, Wisconsin.

== History ==
After Patrick Cudahy's meat-packing partnership with John Plankinton ended, Patrick and his brother John bought land south of Milwaukee to start a new meat-packing operation. They needed transportation, so they built near the Chicago and Northwestern's existing rail line, and they persuaded the railroad to add a depot near their plant, even donating land for the depot.

The station opened in September 1892. In 1893, a Queen Anne Revival depot designed by architect J. B. Berry was added to the station. The depot, located on the southbound platform, included separate men's and women's waiting rooms, a telegrapher's office, and storage space in the attic. Characteristics that mark it as Queen Anne are the stained glass windows, the bay window at the end, the ornate brackets under the eaves, and the chimneys.

Service to the station ended by 1957, and the depot was condemned in 1971 due to its state of disrepair. The following year the Cudahy Historical Society was formed to restore and preserve the building as a museum and community center and in 1978, the historical society acquired the deed to the depot. In 1983, it became a Milwaukee County Registered Landmark and was added to the National Register of Historic Places in 2013.

This station has been included in multiple proposals to be recommissioned (along with South Milwaukee and Racine stations) for a regional rail service between Milwaukee and Kenosha.
