= South Milwaukee station =

South Milwaukee
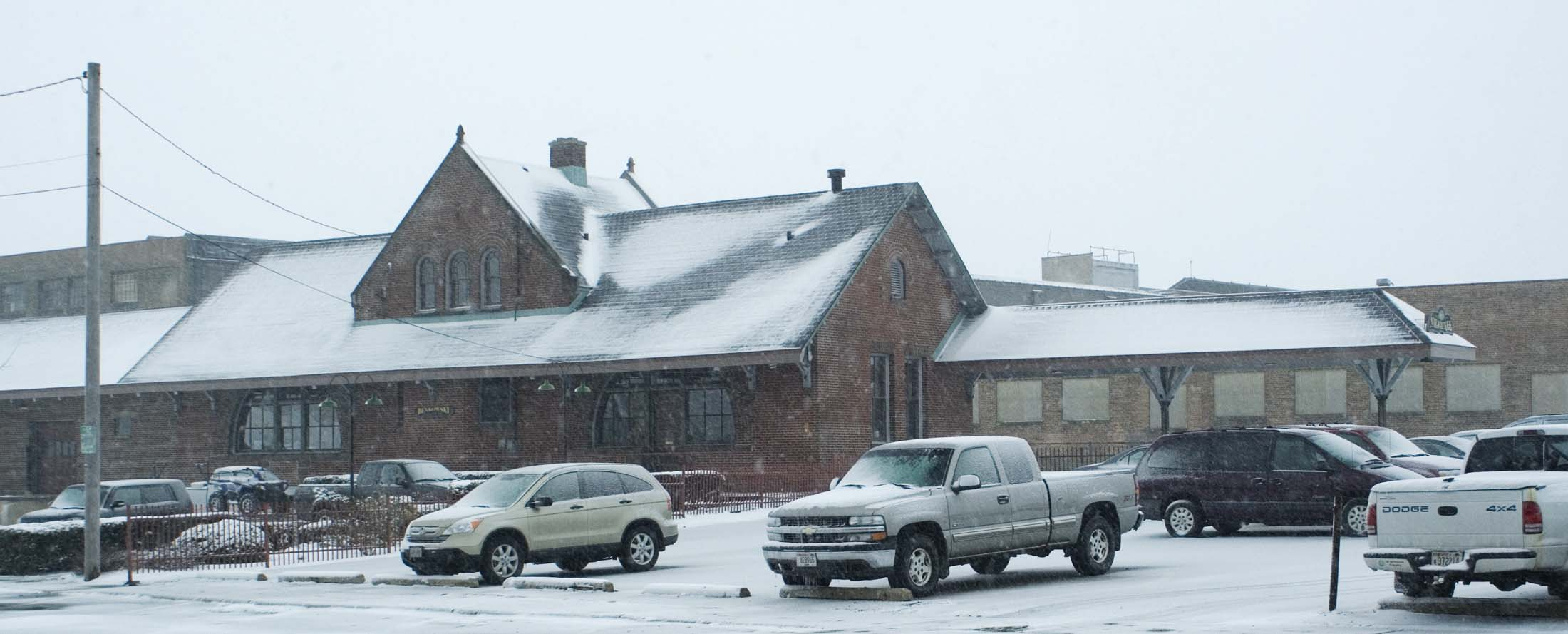

General information
- Location: 1111 Milwaukee Avenue, South Milwaukee, Wisconsin 53172
- Line: Kenosha Subdivision
- Platforms: 2 side platforms
- Tracks: 2

History
- Opened: 1855
- Rebuilt: 1864/1865, 1885, 1893

Services
Preceding station	Chicago and North Western Railway	Following station
Cudahy toward Milwaukee	Milwaukee Division	Racine toward Chicago
- South Milwaukee Passenger Station
- U.S. National Register of Historic Places
- Location within Wisconsin Location within the United States
- Coordinates: 42°54′35″N 87°51′47″W
- Area: 0.5 acres (0.20 ha)
- Built: 1893
- Architect: Charles Sumner Frost
- Architectural style: Romanesque
- NRHP reference No.: 78000119
- Added to NRHP: August 3, 1978
Location

South Milwaukee station is a former railroad station located at 1111 Milwaukee Ave., South Milwaukee, Wisconsin. The station was built in 1893 for the Chicago & Northwestern Railway replacing a frame depot from 1885. Architect Charles Sumner Frost designed the Romanesque station. The depot, located on the east (southbound) platform, included ladies and gentlemen's waiting rooms, restrooms, a ticket office, freight office, train dispatcher's office, and two large rooms for baggage, express, and storage.

Following complaints from station agent Edwin Myers in 1947, the station was renovated. The arched porch area and several doorways were bricked in and many of the windows were boarded up with plywood.

In 1971, the station closed when the line was cut back from Milwaukee to Kenosha. Amtrak soon replaced private passenger rail service in the United States.

The depot was added to the National Register of Historic Places in 1978.

This station has been included in multiple proposals to be recommissioned (along with Cudahy and Racine stations) for a regional rail service between Milwaukee and Kenosha.
