= Zion station =

Commuter rail station in Zion, Illinois

Zion

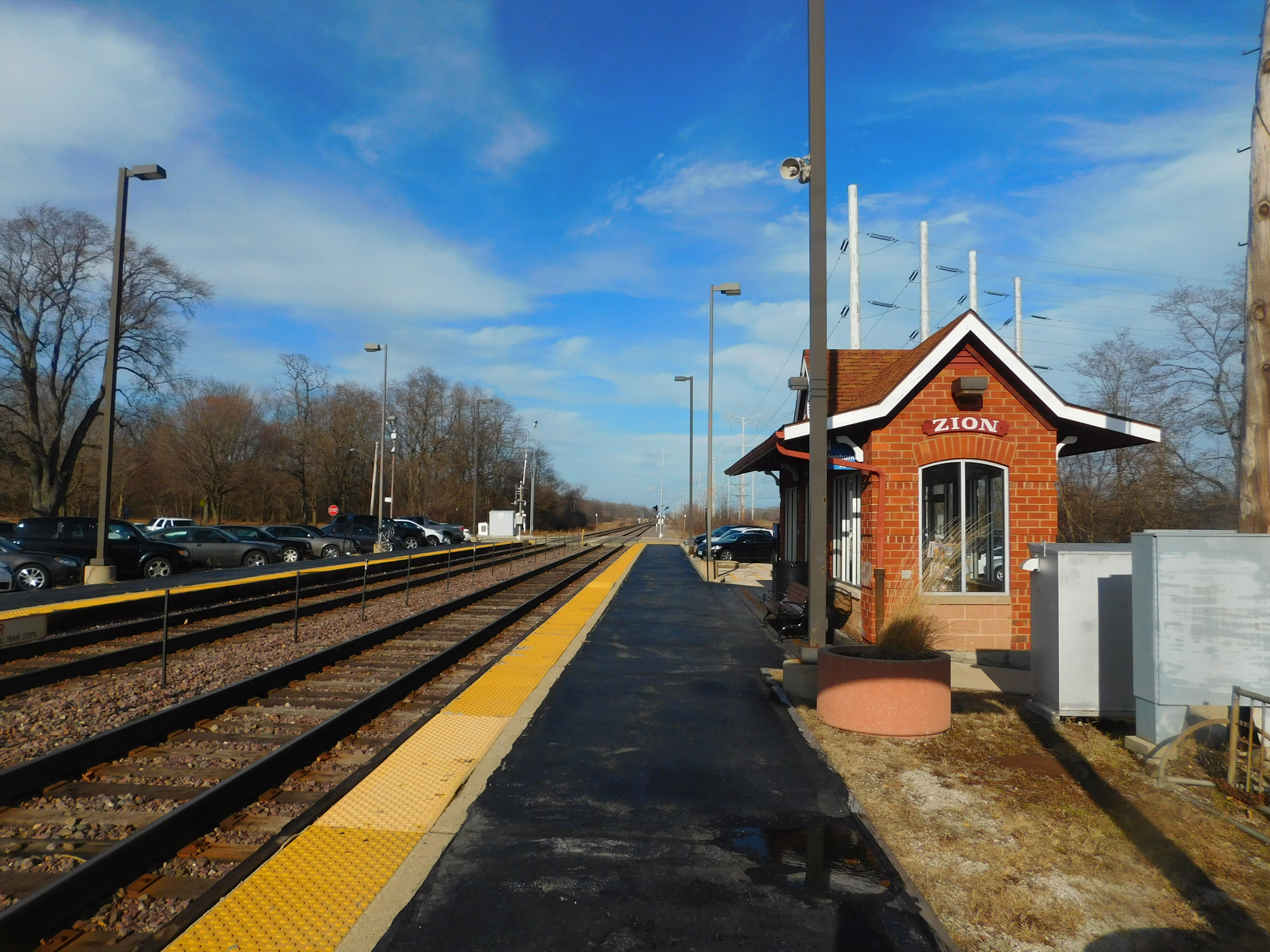
- Zion station in January 2019.

General information
- Location: 2501 South Eden Road; Zion, Illinois
- Coordinates: 42.4492°N 87.8180°W
- Owner: City of Zion
- Platforms: 2 side platforms
- Tracks: 2
- Connections: Pace Buses

Construction
- Structure type: Enclosed shelter
- Parking: Yes
- Accessible: Yes

Other information
- Fare zone: 4

Passengers
- 2018: 110 (average weekday) ▼11.3%
- Rank: 185 out of 236

Services
Preceding station	Metra	Following station
Winthrop Harbor toward Kenosha	Union Pacific North	Waukegan toward Ogilvie TC
Former services
Preceding station	Chicago and North Western Railway	Following station
Camp Logan toward Milwaukee	Milwaukee Division	Dunes Park toward Chicago
Track layout
Location

Zion is a small commuter railroad station on Metra's Union Pacific North Line located in Zion, Illinois. It is located on 2501 South Eden Road, near the intersection with Shiloh Boulevard. It is 42.1 miles (67.8 km) away from Ogilvie Transportation Center—the inbound terminus of the Union Pacific North Line, and also serves commuters who travel north to Kenosha, Wisconsin. Parking is available on both sides of the tracks, and one of the parking lots is along South Eden Road at Shiloh Boulevard. In Metra's zone-based fare system, Zion is in zone 4. As of 2018, Zion is the 185th busiest of Metra's 236 non-downtown stations, with an average of 110 weekday boardings.

The structure at Zion Station is an unstaffed decorative shelter. In the building are some seats and also some shelves for book exchange. It also serves as a stop for passengers who visit Illinois Beach State Park.

As of September 20, 2025, Zion is served by 19 trains (10 inbound, nine outbound) on weekdays, and by 16 trains (eight in each direction) on weekends and holidays.

Many trains on the Union Pacific North Line do not serve Zion. Most trains terminate at Waukegan station; Zion is mostly served during peak hours only, with a few weekend trains. This limited rail service makes this station an impractical method of reaching Chicago during off-peak hours. Passengers can take the 571 Pace bus which goes to Waukegan.

== Bus Connections ==
Pace

- 571 Zion (3 blocks west at Sheridan Road)
