= Clybourn station =

Commuter rail station in Chicago, Illinois

Clybourn

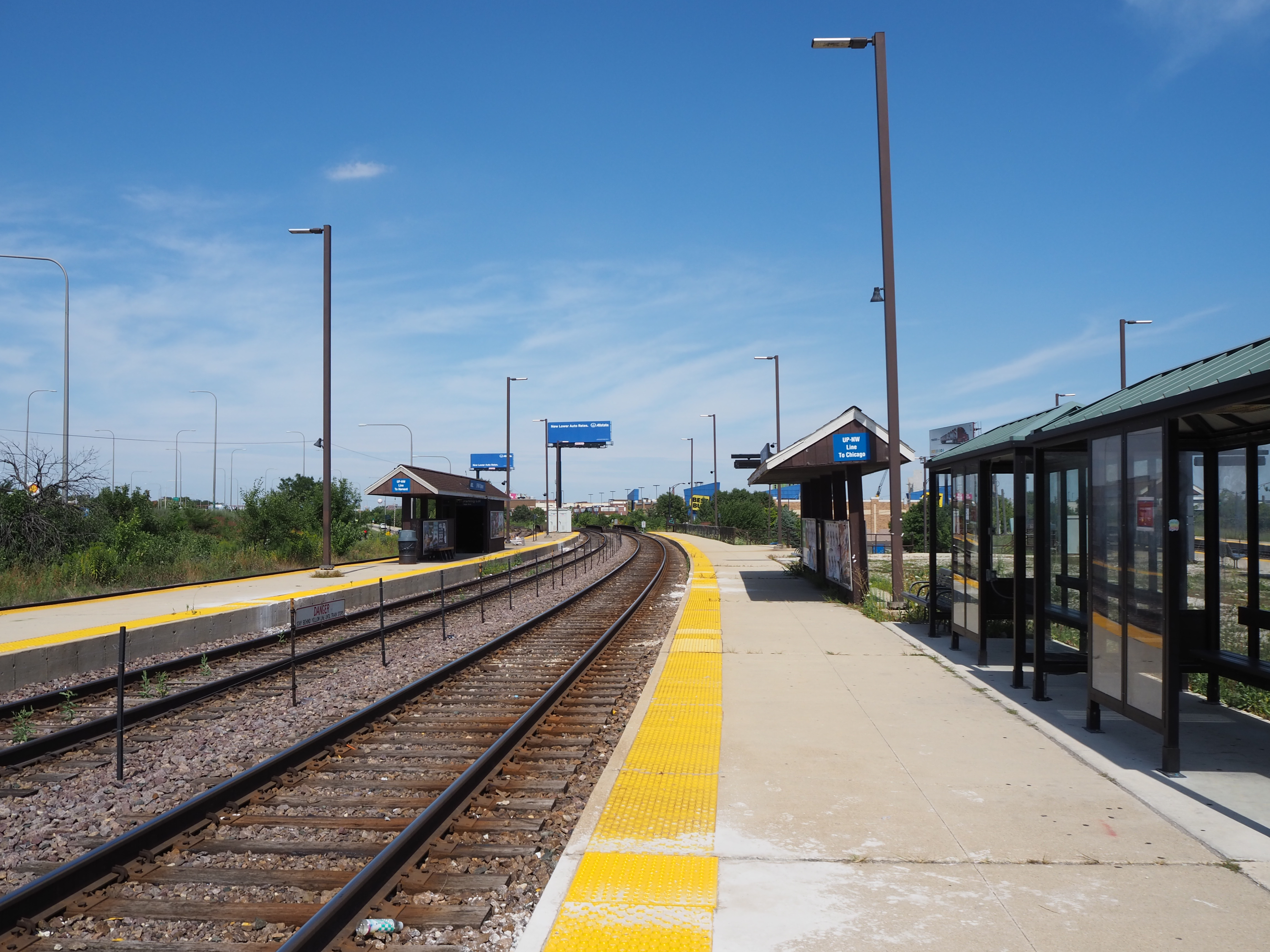
- Union Pacific Northwest Line platforms

General information
- Location: 2001 North Ashland Avenue; Chicago, Illinois 60614
- Coordinates: 41.91716°N 87.66824°W
- Owner: Union Pacific
- Platforms: 1 island platform, 3 side platforms
- Tracks: 3 (UP-NW); 2 (UP-N)
- Connections: Chicago Transit Authority

Construction
- Structure type: Separate platforms
- Platform levels: Elevated
- Parking: Yes; Mostly street-side
- Cycle facilities: Park on Ashland
- Accessible: No

Other information
- Station code: 60639
- Fare zone: 2

History
- Opened: 1900
- Former names: Clybourn Junction

Passengers
- 2018: 1,674 (average weekday) ▼8.6%
- Rank: 17 out of 236

Services
Preceding station	Metra	Following station
Ravenswood toward Kenosha	Union Pacific North	Ogilvie TC Terminus
Irving Park toward Harvard or McHenry	Union Pacific Northwest	Ogilvie TC Terminus
Former services
Preceding station	Chicago and North Western Railway	Following station
Deering toward Milwaukee	Milwaukee Division	Chicago Terminus
Jefferson Park toward Minneapolis	Chicago – Minneapolis via Madison	Chicago Terminus
Maplewood toward Crystal Lake	Wisconsin Division	Chicago Terminus
Track layout
Location

Clybourn is a railroad station in Chicago serving Metra's Union Pacific North Line and Union Pacific Northwest Line. It is located at 2001 North Ashland Avenue (at West Armitage Avenue) and is the first station north of Ogilvie Transportation Center. Clybourn is located at Clybourn Junction. The Union Pacific North Line's Kenosha Subdivision begins here, separating from the Union Pacific Northwest Line's Harvard Subdivision. Clybourn Junction was named for its location near Clybourn Place, the home of the Clybourn family, early settlers in the Chicago area. Clybourn is situated between the Bucktown and DePaul neighborhoods, several miles north of downtown Chicago. In Metra's zone-based fare schedule, Clybourn is in zone 2. As of 2018, Clybourn is the 17th busiest of Metra's 236 non-downtown stations, with an average of 1,674 weekday boardings.

North Line and Northwest Line trains stop on separate platforms, between which is a small parking lot. From west to east, the platforms are numbered from 1 to 4. Platform 1 is an island platform, serving Northwest Line trains on the center track in the peak direction, and all outbound trains. Platform 2 is a side platform, serving inbound Northwest Line trains that do not run on the center track. Platforms 3 and 4, which serve the North Line, are side platforms. Platform 3 serves all outbound trains and Platform 4 serves all inbound trains. The busy Kennedy Expressway passes to the west of the Northwest Line tracks, and the north branch of the Chicago River is several blocks to the east. There is no ticket agent booth at the station; passengers must buy tickets on the train either online or after boarding.

The station is in a mostly industrial neighborhood, though it is served by Chicago Transit Authority buses.

On the Union Pacific North Line, as of September 20, 2025, Clybourn is served by all 71 trains (35 inbound, 36 outbound) on weekdays, and by all 30 trains (15 in each direction) on weekends and holidays. During the summer concert season, an extra weekend train to Ravinia Park station also stops here.

On the Union Pacific Northwest Line, as of May 30, 2023, Clybourn is served by 69 trains (34 inbound, 35 outbound) on weekdays, by 31 trains (16 inbound, 15 outbound) on Saturdays, and by 19 trains (nine inbound, 10 outbound) on Sundays and holidays.

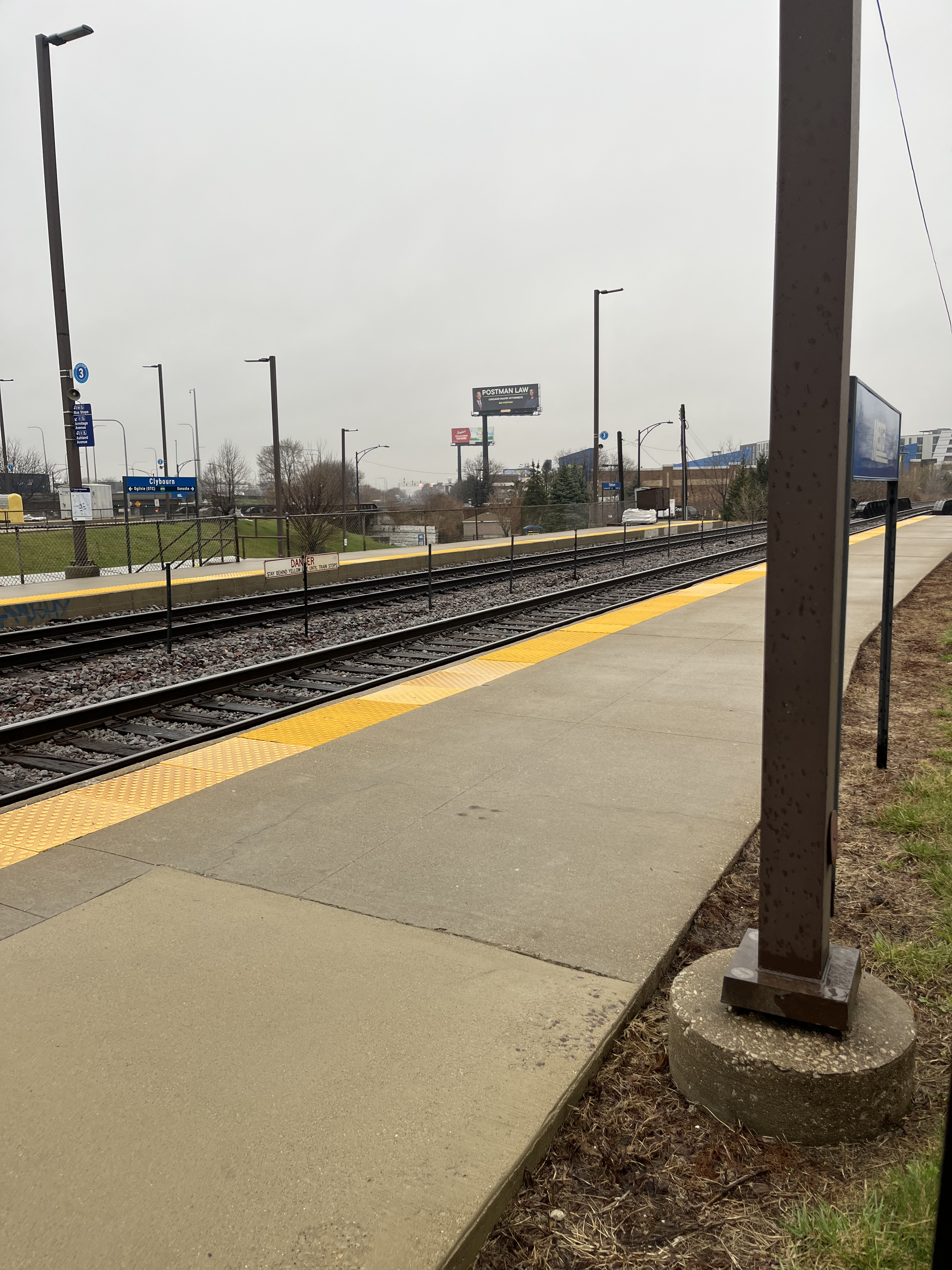
Union Pacific North Line platforms

From Clybourn station, it is possible to take a train as far north as Kenosha, Wisconsin and as far northwest as Harvard, Illinois.

Clybourn is 2.9 miles (4.7 km) from Ogilvie Transportation Center, 48.7 miles (78.4 km) from Kenosha, and 60.2 miles (96.9 km) from Harvard.

== CTA Bus Connections ==
- 9 Ashland
- X9 Ashland Express
- 73 Armitage
