= Union Pacific North Line =

Commuter rail line in Wisconsin and Illinois

- Metra UP-N train at Waukegan in July 2025

Overview
- Status: Operational
- Owner: Union Pacific Railroad
- Locale: Chicago metropolitan area
- Termini: Ogilvie Transportation Center; Waukegan (Most trips) Kenosha
- Stations: 28
- Website: metra.com/train-lines/up-n

Service
- Type: Commuter rail
- System: Metra
- Operator: Metra
- Daily ridership: 41,000 (Avg. Weekday 2009)
- Ridership: 5,186,614 (2025)

Technical
- Line length: 51.6 miles (83.0 km)
- Num of tracks: 2
- Track gauge: 4 ft 8 1/2 in (1,435 mm) standard gauge
Route map
Union Pacific North Line highlighted in dark green
Key
- Mileage source All stations are accessible except Clybourn, Indian Hill, and Hubbard Woods.

The Union Pacific North Line (UP-N) is a commuter rail line operated by Metra in the Chicago metropolitan area. It runs between Ogilvie Transportation Center in downtown Chicago and Kenosha, Wisconsin. Most trains, however, terminate in Waukegan, Illinois. Since May 2025, the service is operated directly by Metra. Previously, it was operated by the Union Pacific Railroad (UP) under purchase-of-service agreement. UP continues to own the tracks and manage dispatching as part of its Kenosha Subdivision.

This line was previously operated by the Chicago & North Western Railway (C&NW) before its merger with the Union Pacific Railroad, being called the Chicago and North Western Milwaukee Division and then the Chicago & North Western/North Line before the C&NW was absorbed by Union Pacific on April 19, 1995.

== Service levels ==
The UP-N is currently the only Metra line that travels outside Illinois (albeit still within Chicagoland). The MARK project is currently considering options to extend service north from Chicagoland to the greater Milwaukee area.

Metra does not refer to its lines by particular colors, but the timetable accents for the Union Pacific North line are dark "Flambeau Green", a nod to the C&NW's Flambeau 400 passenger train.

Until 2022, a private club car ran weekdays exclusively on the Union Pacific North Line. It was the last remaining private car in service on a commuter railroad in the United States.

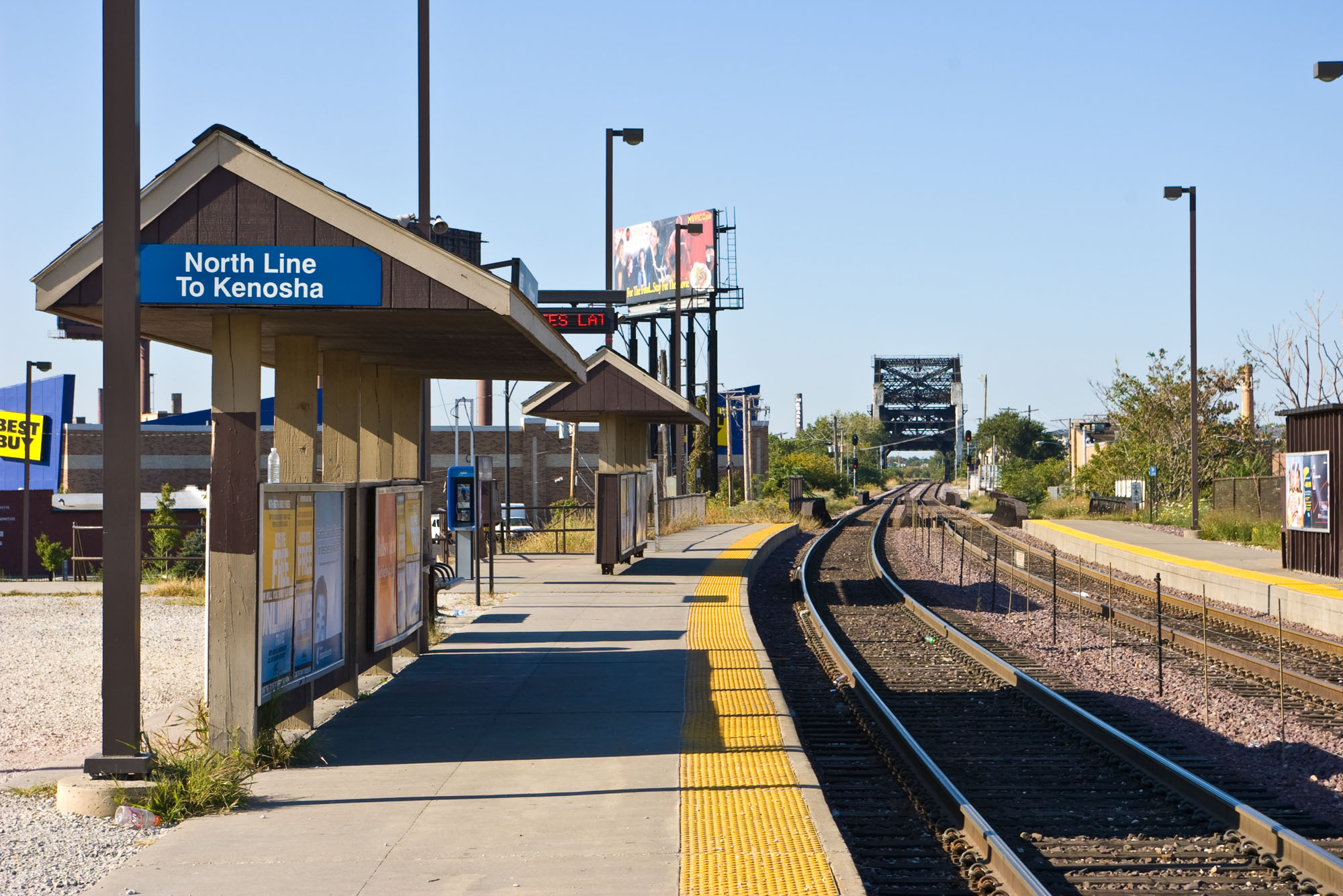
The UP-North Line splits off from the UP-Northwest Line at Clybourn

As of September 20, 2025, the current timetable shows 71 trains (35 inbound, 36 outbound) on weekdays. Of these, ten inbound trains originate from Kenosha, 16 from Waukegan, seven from Highland Park, and two from Winnetka. Four outbound trains terminate at Winnetka, six at Highland Park, 17 at Waukegan, and nine at Kenosha.

Fifteen trains operate in each direction on weekends and holidays. Of these, eight inbound trains originate from Kenosha and seven originate from Waukegan. Seven outbound trains terminate at Waukegan and eight terminate at Kenosha.

During the summer concert season, on weekends, an extra outbound train, named RAV1, makes all stops to Winnetka, then runs express to Ravinia Park during events, with a train returning to Chicago after the concert.

All stations on the line except for Ravinia Park are open daily. Ravinia Park is only open during the Ravinia Festival in the summer months.

== History ==
In 1854, the Chicago & Milwaukee Railroad constructed the route followed by the UP North Line.

On January 4, 1855, passenger service began between Chicago and Waukegan. Initially, a single train operated each day, departing from a terminal in Chicago at Water St. and Kinzie St. at 8:30 am (08:30 CT) and returning from Waukegan at 3:30 pm (15:30 CT).

The president of the railroad, former Chicago mayor Walter S. Gurnee, speculated on land in Lake County, spurring the development of railway suburbs along the line.

In 1863, the railroad merged with the Green Bay, Milwaukee & Chicago Railroad, and was then acquired by the Chicago and North Western Railway in 1866.

In 1911, commuter rail services along the line started operating into the new Chicago and North Western Terminal (now Ogilvie Transportation Center).

In 1966, the Chicago and North Western closed the Lake Front Depot and began operating into the new Milwaukee Union Station. This service would ultimately prove to be relatively short lived as the Chicago and North Western ended operations between Chicago and Milwaukee in 1971 and the line was truncated to Kenosha.

In 1984, the North line became part of the newly-formed Metra agency. The trains continued to be operated by the Chicago and North Western Railway under contract until that railroad was bought by Union Pacific in 1995.

Although Kenosha is located outside the service area of the Northern Illinois Transit Authority (NITA), Metra retains service there as it was already part of the service agreement signed with C&NW and does not cost anything extra. Metra states that the Waukegan yard is not large enough to store the number of train sets needed to operate UP-N service and it would have been more expensive to cut Kenosha service and build an entirely new yard within Illinois compared to simply using the existing yard facilities in Kenosha.

From 1995 to 2025, Union Pacific operated passenger services along the line for Metra. Under a longstanding agreement that Union Pacific inherited from the C&NW, Metra owned the rolling stock and the stations along the line, while Union Pacific crews operated the trains, and Union Pacific had continued to control the right-of-way along the route.

Between 2010 and 2022, Metra and Union Pacific worked to replace 11 bridges that were over 100-years-old and beyond their useful life on Chicago's North Side between Balmoral Avenue and Grace Street. The project cost was $166 million and included the complete reconstruction of the Ravenswood station.

In 2021, Metra announced plans to replace an additional set of 11 bridges between Addison Street and Fullerton Avenue. The project is expected to cost $337 million, with much of the funding coming from a $117 million federal MEGA grant. Construction was expected to start in 2023 following the completion of the Balmoral Ave-Grace St bridges, but Metra has faced pushback from residents living along the right-of-way. As of October 2025, Metra anticipates construction to begin in 2026 and be completed by the end of 2030. All 22 bridges from Balmoral Avenue to Fullerton Avenue were expected to have been replaced by 2018.

Beginning in 2023, Union Pacific announced that commuter operations on all three of the Union Pacific lines would be transferred to Metra; the Union Pacific would continue to own and maintain the right-of-way.

The transfer was initially expected to occur by Q1 or the end of March 2024, but it was delayed by a year to May 16, 2025.

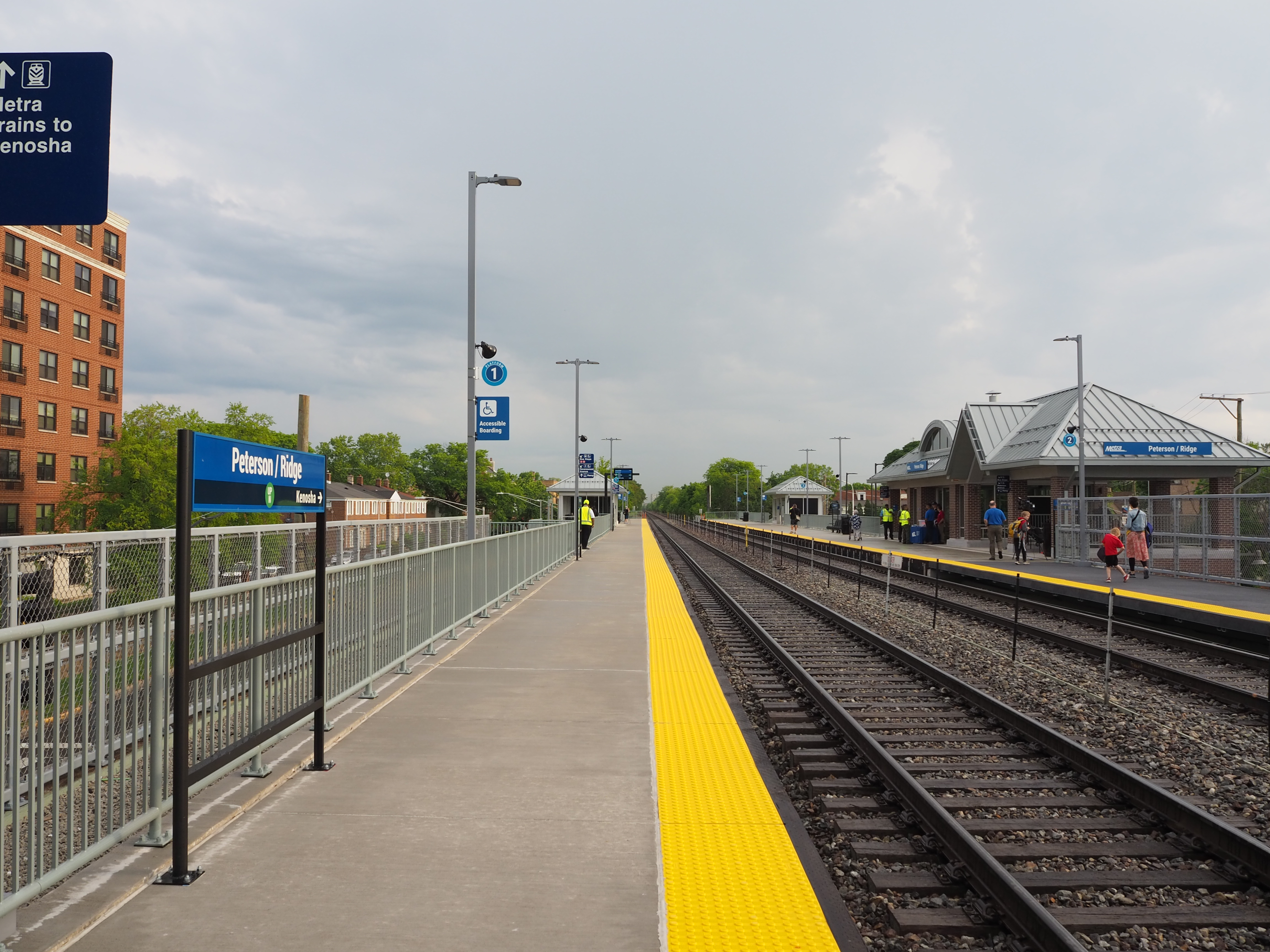
Peterson/Ridge, opened in May 2024

On May 20, 2024, a new station named Peterson/Ridge was opened in Chicago's Edgewater neighborhood. It is situated between the Rogers Park and Ravenswood stations.

== Ridership ==
Between 2014 and 2019, annual ridership declined by 8.3% from 9,328,441 passengers to 8,552,117 passengers. Due to the COVID-19 pandemic, ridership dropped to 2,300,363 passengers in 2020. As of October 2024, the line has Metra's highest ridership recovery rate at 83% of pre-pandemic weekday ridership. Peak-direction ridership is at 70% of pre-pandemic numbers, while all other metrics (reverse-peak, midday, evening, Saturday, and Sunday ridership) is at or above pre-pandemic ridership. The line's 5,186,614 riders in 2025 made it the third busiest Metra line.

== Route ==
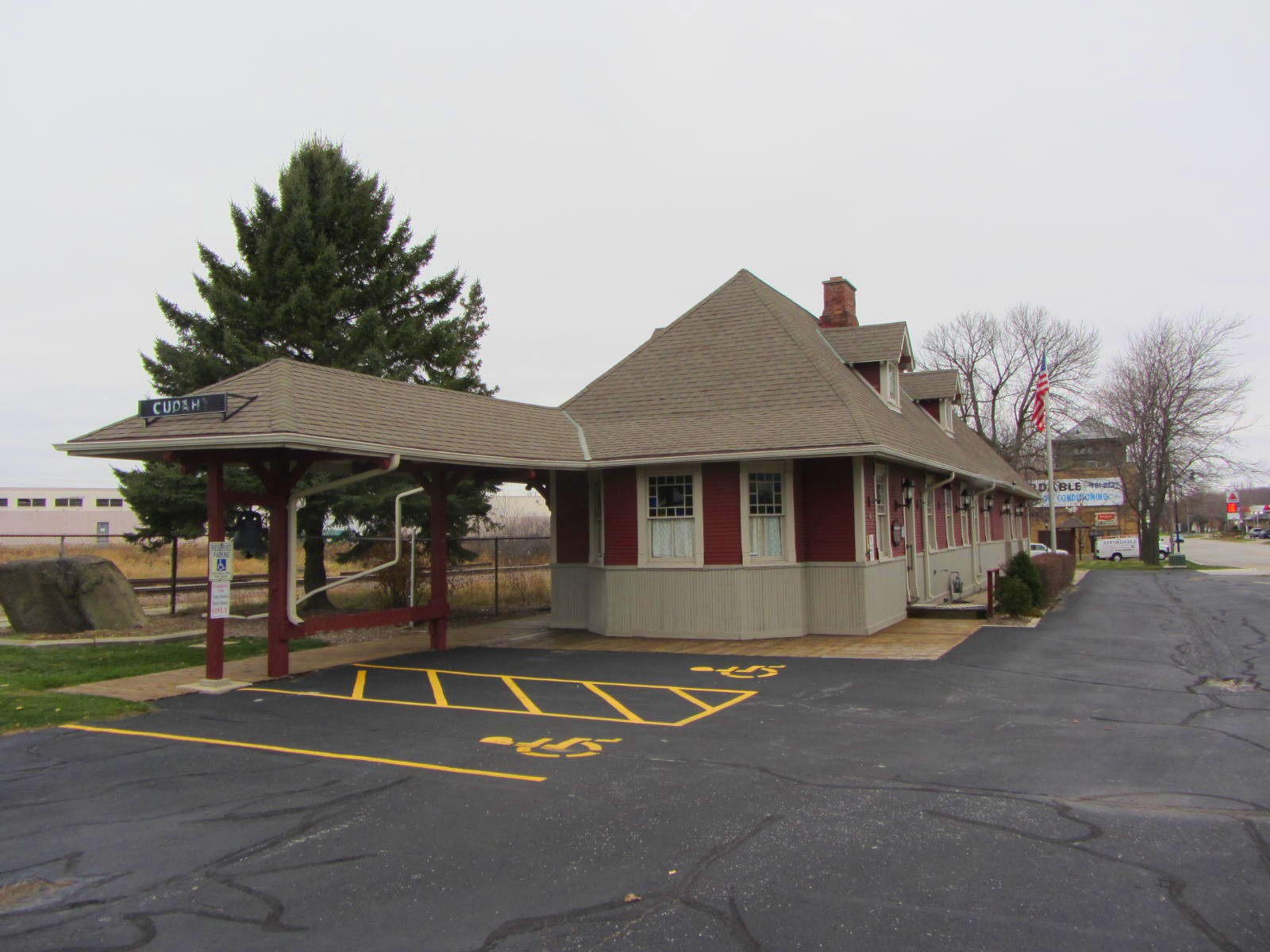
The old passenger train depot in Cudahy is near the northern end of the Kenosha Subdivision in Saint Francis.

The service shares the Union Pacific Railroad's Harvard Subdivision with the Union Pacific Northwest Line from Ogilvie Transportation Center in downtown Chicago to a junction just before Clybourn station. From Clybourn, the North Line splits from the Northwest Line and traverses the Kenosha Subdivision north to Kenosha, Wisconsin. The Kenosha Subdivision continues to St. Francis, Wisconsin and a junction with the Union Pacific's Milwaukee Subdivision.

No passenger trains currently operate north of Kenosha, but options are being considered to eventually extend service to Milwaukee, possibly with different rolling stock.

The Green Bay Trail parallels the Union Pacific North Line, using the former right of way of the North Shore Line for over 51.9 miles (83.5 km) from the Chicago Loop to Kenosha, Wisconsin.

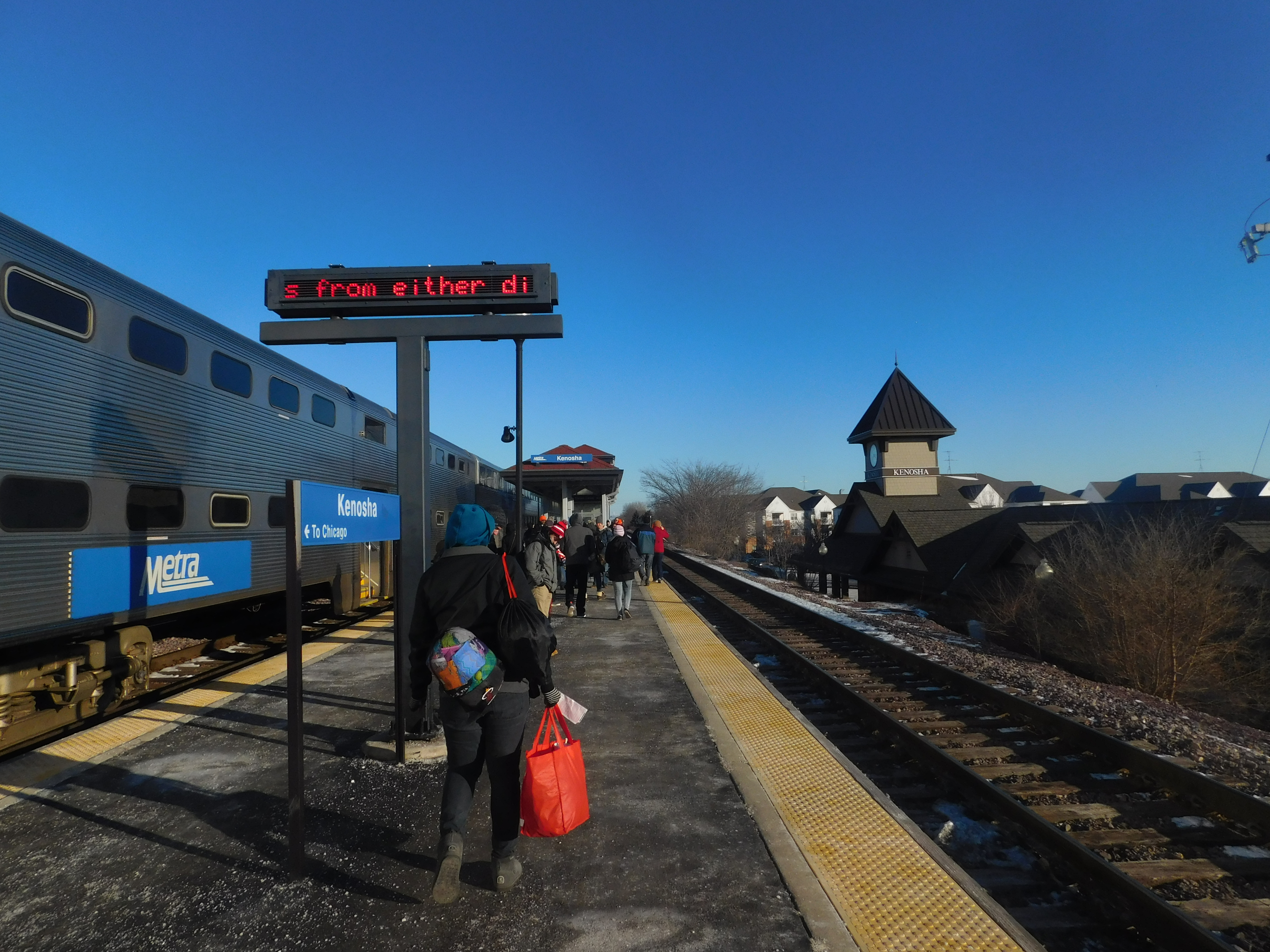
The Kenosha station, terminus of the UP-N and the only Metra station in Wisconsin.

== Stations ==
State	County	Zone	Location	Station	Connections and notes
WI	Milwaukee				
WI	Milwaukee		Milwaukee	Lake Front Depot	Closed 1966
WI	Milwaukee		Milwaukee	Union Station	Closed April 30, 1971
WI	Milwaukee		Milwaukee	National Avenue	Closed between 1943 and 1956
WI	Milwaukee		Cudahy	Cudahy	Closed 1957
WI	Milwaukee		South Milwaukee	South Milwaukee	Closed between 1956 and 1961
WI	Racine				
WI	Racine		Racine	Racine	Closed April 30, 1971
WI	Kenosha	4	Kenosha	Kenosha	Kenosha Area Transit: 1, 4; Kenosha Streetcar
IL	Lake	4	Winthrop Harbor	Winthrop Harbor	
IL	Lake	4	Zion	Camp Logan	Closed after October 28, 1956, served Camp Logan
IL	Lake	4	Zion	Zion	Pace: 571
IL	Lake		Beach Park	Dunes Park	Closed after October 28, 1956
IL	Lake		Waukegan	Asbestos	Closed after October 28, 1956
IL	Lake	4	Waukegan	Waukegan	Pace: 561, 562, 563, 564, 565, 568, 571, 572
IL	Lake	4	North Chicago	Abbott's Platform	Closed 1986
IL	Lake	4	North Chicago	North Chicago	Pace: 563, 564
IL	Lake	4	North Chicago	Great Lakes	Pace: 563
IL	Lake	4	Lake Bluff	Lake Bluff	
IL	Lake	4	Lake Forest	Lake Forest	
IL	Lake	4	Highwood	Fort Sheridan	Pace: 472
IL	Lake	4	Highwood	Highwood	Pace: 472
IL	Lake	4	Highland Park	Highland Park	Pace: 213, 471, 472
IL	Lake	3	Highland Park	Ravinia	
IL	Lake	3	Highland Park	Ravinia Park	Seasonal
IL	Lake	3	Highland Park	Braeside	
IL	Cook	3	Glencoe	Glencoe	Pace: 213
IL	Cook	3	Winnetka	Hubbard Woods	Pace: 213
IL	Cook	3	Winnetka	Winnetka	Pace: 213, 423
IL	Cook	3	Winnetka	Indian Hill	Pace: 213
IL	Cook	3	Kenilworth	Kenilworth	Pace: 213
IL	Cook	2	Wilmette	Wilmette	Pace: 213, 421, 422
IL	Cook	2	Evanston	Central Street/Evanston	CTA buses: 201 206; Pace: 213
IL	Cook	2	Evanston	Davis Street/Evanston	Chicago "L": Purple (at Davis); Pace Pulse: ■ Dempster Line; CTA buses: 93 201 206; Pace: 208, 213, 250
IL	Cook	2	Evanston	Dempster Street	Closed December 1, 1958
IL	Cook	2	Evanston	Main Street/Evanston	Chicago "L": Purple (at Main); CTA buses: 206; Pace: 213
IL	Cook	2	Evanston	Calvary	Closed December 1, 1958
IL	Cook	2	Chicago	Rogers Park	CTA buses: 22 96
IL	Cook	2	Chicago	Kenmore	Closed December 1, 1958, replaced with Peterson/Ridge
IL	Cook	2	Chicago	Peterson/Ridge	CTA buses: 84
IL	Cook	2	Chicago	Rose Hill	Closed December 1, 1958
IL	Cook	2	Chicago	Summerdale	Closed December 1, 1958
IL	Cook	2	Chicago	Ravenswood	Chicago "L": Brown (at Damen); CTA buses: 9 81
IL	Cook		Chicago	Ravenswood–Wilson	Closed after July 3, 1963, replaced with Ravenswood
IL	Cook		Chicago	Northcenter	Closed December 1, 1958
IL	Cook		Chicago	Belmont Avenue	Closed December 1, 1958
IL	Cook		Chicago	Deering	Closed after June 13, 1943
IL	Cook	2	Chicago	Clybourn	Metra: Union Pacific Northwest; CTA buses: 9 X9 73
IL	Cook		Chicago	Kinzie Street Depot	Closed c. 1879
IL	Cook		Chicago	Wells Street Station	Closed 1911, replaced by the Chicago and North Western Terminal
IL	Cook	1	Chicago	Ogilvie; Transportation Center	Metra: Union Pacific Northwest, Union Pacific West; Chicago "L": Green Pink (at Clinton); CTA buses: J14 19 56 60 120 124 125 126 128 130 157 192

== See also ==
- Kenosha–Racine–Milwaukee rail service, a proposed restoration of passenger service between Kenosha and Milwaukee.
