= Racine station (Wisconsin) =

Historic railroad station

Racine
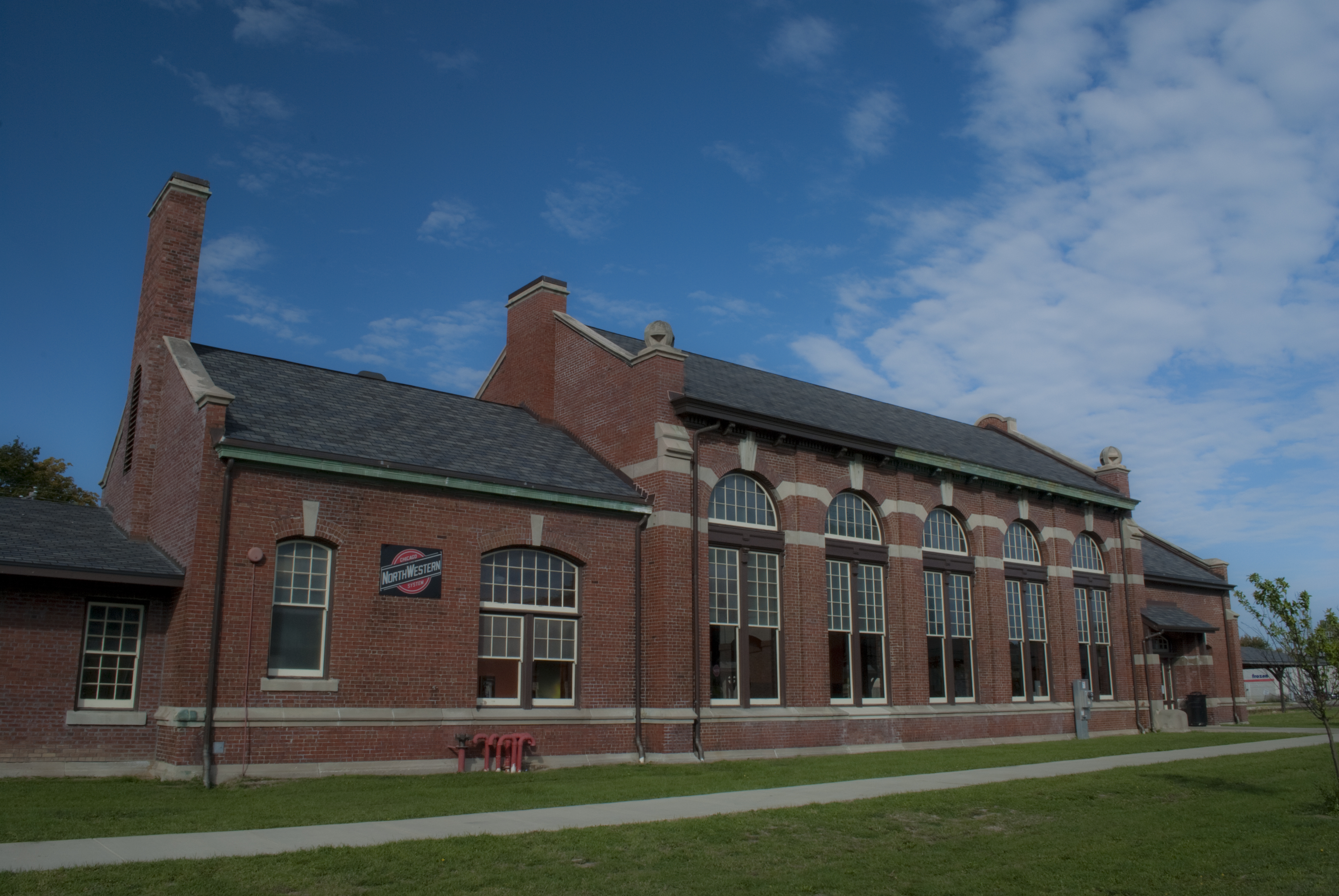
- Racine Depot

General information
- Location: 1402 Liberty Street, Racine, Wisconsin 53404
- Line: Kenosha Subdivision
- Platforms: 2 side platforms
- Tracks: 2

History
- Closed: April 30, 1971

Services
Preceding station	Chicago and North Western Railway	Following station
Milwaukee toward Minneapolis	Chicago – Minneapolis via Milwaukee	Kenosha toward Chicago
South Milwaukee Until 1966 toward Milwaukee	Milwaukee Division	Kenosha toward Chicago
Milwaukee Union After 1966 Terminus	Milwaukee Division	Kenosha toward Chicago
- Racine Depot
- U.S. National Register of Historic Places
- Location within Wisconsin Location within the United States
- Coordinates: 42°43′50″N 87°47′52″W
- Area: 1 acre (0.40 ha)
- Built: 1902
- Architect: Frost & Granger
- Architectural style: Georgian Revival
- NRHP reference No.: 80000180
- Added to NRHP: October 10, 1980
Location

The Racine Depot is a historic railroad station located at 1402 Liberty Street in Racine, Wisconsin. The station was built in 1901 for the Chicago & North Western Railway. Architects Frost & Granger designed the Georgian Revival station. The depot, located on the southbound platform, included a waiting room, restrooms, a baggage room, and a ticket office. The waiting room's decorations included oak benches, wood paneling, and a terrazzo floor. A tunnel connected the depot to the westbound platform.

The station served up to twenty-six trains each day at its peak, providing a means for Racine County's citizens to travel to and from other cities. The Twin Cities 400, an express train from Chicago to Minneapolis, began service to the station in 1935; at the time, it was the fastest train in North America. The depot also brought presidential campaign trains to Racine, and Theodore Roosevelt, Franklin D. Roosevelt, and Harry Truman all travelled through the station. In 1971, the station closed when Amtrak replaced private passenger rail service in the United States; Racine County is now served by Amtrak's Sturtevant station. There are plans to restore service to Racine station as part of a commuter line between Milwaukee and Kenosha.

In 2004, the Racine Metro Transit Center (now simply called the Racine Transit Center), a bus station, was built immediately adjacent to the railroad depot, with architecture matching the depot. The depot is used as a waiting room for the buses. It currently serves RYDE Racine and the Wisconsin Coach Lines Kenosha-Racine-Milwaukee bus service.

The depot was added to the National Register of Historic Places in 1980.
