= Waukegan station =

Commuter rail station in Waukegan, Illinois

Waukegan

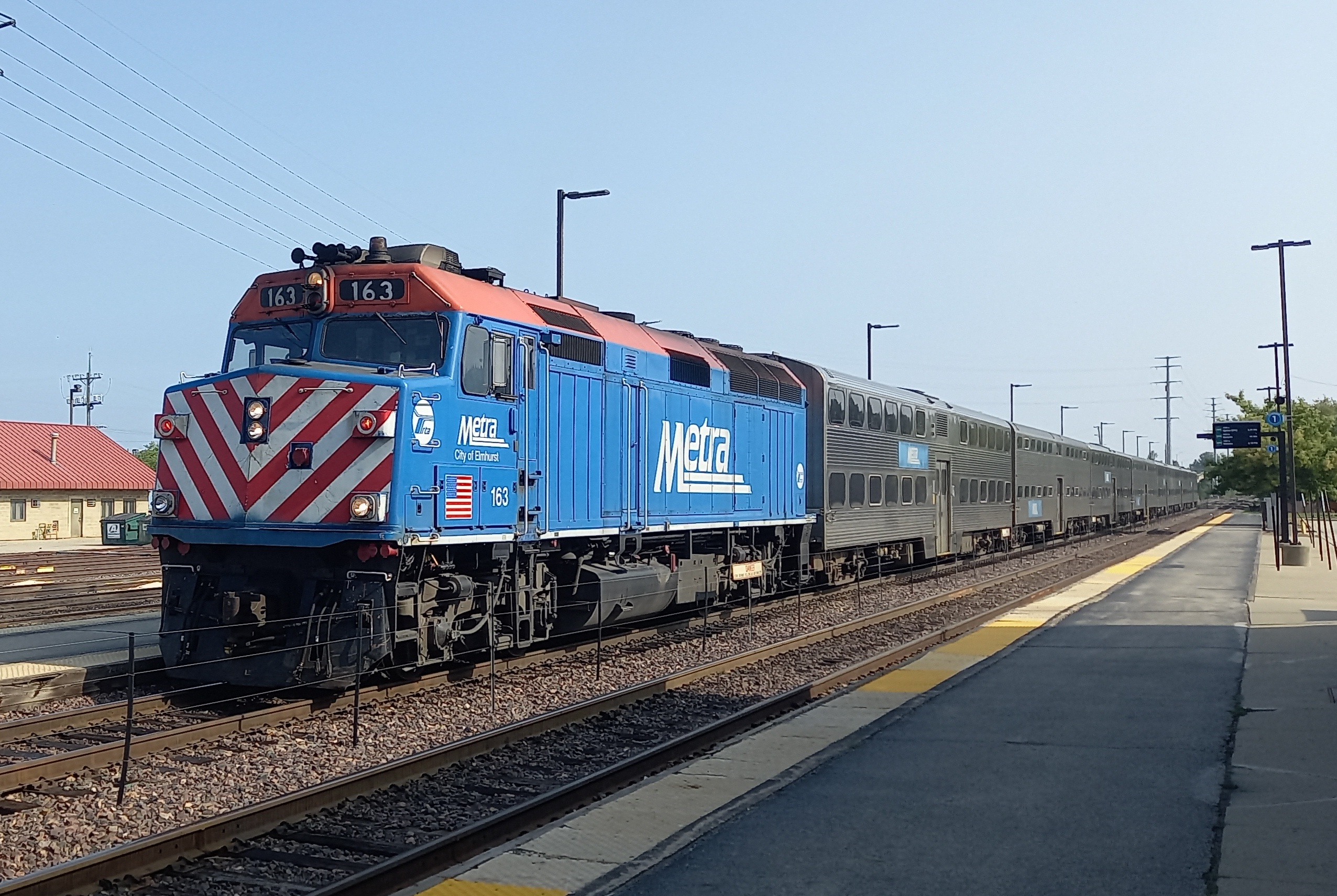
- Metra train at Waukegan in July 2025

General information
- Location: 95 North Spring Street, Waukegan, Illinois
- Coordinates: 42.3607°N 87.8283°W
- Owner: Union Pacific, City of Waukegan
- Platforms: 1 side platform, 1 island platform
- Tracks: 3
- Connections: Pace Buses

Construction
- Parking: Yes
- Accessible: Yes

Other information
- Fare zone: 4

History
- Opened: 1900
- Rebuilt: 1988

Passengers
- 2018: 764 (average weekday) ▼16.1%
- Rank: 67 out of 236

Services
Preceding station	Metra	Following station
Zion toward Kenosha	Union Pacific North	North Chicago toward Ogilvie TC
Former services
Preceding station	Chicago and North Western Railway	Following station
Kenosha toward Minneapolis	Chicago – Minneapolis via Milwaukee	Lake Forest toward Chicago
Asbestos toward Milwaukee	Milwaukee Division	North Chicago toward Chicago
Track layout
Location

Waukegan is a railroad station in Waukegan, Illinois, served by Metra's Union Pacific North Line. It is officially located on 95 North Spring Street, is 36.0 miles (57.9 km) away from Ogilvie Transportation Center, the inbound terminus of the Union Pacific North Line, and also serves commuters who travel north to Kenosha, Wisconsin. In Metra's zone-based fare system, Waukegan is in zone 4. As of 2018, Waukegan is the 67th busiest of Metra's 236 non-downtown stations, with an average of 764 weekday boardings.

As of September 20, 2025, Waukegan is served by 51 trains (26 inbound, 25 outbound) on weekdays, and by all 30 trains (15 in each direction) on weekends and holidays.

A total of 16 outbound trains terminate at Waukegan, along with 16 inbound trains originating here, on weekdays. On weekends and holidays, seven trains originate, and seven trains terminate, at Waukegan.

Although Waukegan Station is not the terminus of the Union Pacific North Line, most trains along the line end at Waukegan. The station not only contains storage tracks for Metra trains, but is also located near freight lines for the Union Pacific Railroad as well as the former Elgin, Joliet and Eastern Railway. There is also a Union Pacific freight yard adjacent to the station and freight trains are often parked and sorted here. In addition, the station serves as a stop for the Great Lakes Naval Training Center. Passengers who wish to travel to the Zion Metra station can use Pace's route 571, which provides daily service between the two stations.

Waukegan Station is located very near to downtown Waukegan, home to attractions such as the Genesee Theatre. Located at the bottom of the bluff that overlooks Lake Michigan, the station is immediately downhill from the historic Carnegie Library building. Other historic buildings in the area include the old houses of the Shimer College Historic District, site of that school's campus until 2006. Buses connect the station to attractions further inland, such as Six Flags Great America in Gurnee.

== Bus connections ==
Pace

- 561 Castlecrest via McAree
- 562 Gurnee via Sunset
- 563 Great Lakes Naval Station
- 564 Jackson/14th
- 565 Grand Avenue
- 568 Belvidere
- 571 Zion
- 572 Washington
