= Kenosha Area Transit =

Public transportation agency in Kenosha, Wisconsin

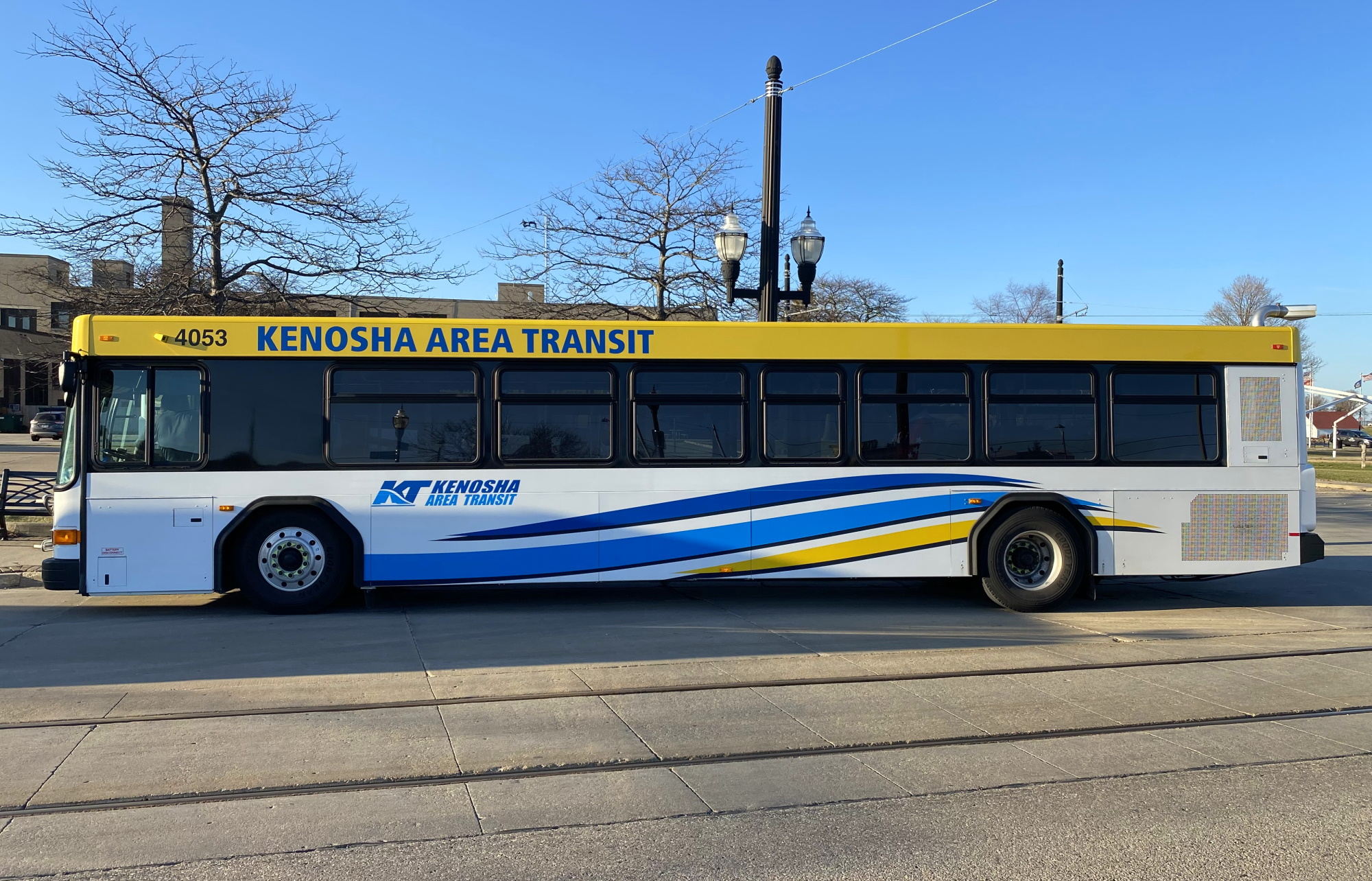
- Headquarters: 4303 39th Avenue; Kenosha, Wisconsin
- Service area: City of Kenosha and Village of Pleasant Prairie
- Service type: Bus service, streetcar
- Routes: 7
- Annual ridership: Bus: 1,338,109 (2018); Streetcar: 39,569 (2018)
- Operator: City of Kenosha
- Chief executive: Nelson Ogbuagu
- Website: kenosha.org

Kenosha Area Transit is a city-owned public transportation agency based in Kenosha, Wisconsin.

The system maintains a fleet of 47 buses and seven streetcars operating on seven bus routes and one streetcar route throughout the City of Kenosha and Village of Pleasant Prairie.

== History ==
Urban public transit service has been available in the City of Kenosha since February 3, 1903, when streetcar operations commenced over the Kenosha Electric Railway using two Birney cars, later supplemented by motor buses. There were several owners of the system over the decades. On February 14, 1932, the service was supplanted by a system of twenty-two electric trolley-buses, also called trackless trolleys; 10 St. Louis Car Company coaches (Job 1555); and 12 Yellow Coach Model MTA 701 coaches. At that point, the Wisconsin Gas & Electric Company, the operators at the time, pioneered a color-coded route designation system, which is believed to be the first in the world.

Ford V8 gasoline transit buses were introduced to supplement increased wartime-production service during World War II.

On September 5, 1942, the system came under the ownership of Kenosha Motor Coach Lines and later Kenosha Motor Coach Company, which had been incorporated on June 27, 1942. By 1948, the company began purchasing new diesel coaches, which finally supplanted all trolley-bus operations in March 1952.

The president of Kenosha Motor Coach Lines was Henry P. Bruner (November 16, 1900 - November 30, 1993). Bruner had been a transportation consultant in Indiana, and with personal assets of approximately $16,000 managed to acquire southeastern Wisconsin transit properties valued at $1,242,000. He acquired the Racine city system in 1939 from The Milwaukee Electric Railway and Transport, known as Racine Motor Coach Lines.

On December 27, 1943, KMCL under Bruner purchased the ten and one-half mile Kenosha-Racine segment of the Milwaukee-Racine-Kenosha rapid transit trackage from Milwaukee's Transport Company for $100,000, with a down payment of $22,500 and an annual payment of $7,750 plus an annual right-of-way rental of $6,500. (The book value of the line was $952,388.)

On September 27, 1944, KMCL, with a $75,000 down-payment, an annual payment of $5,000 and a yearly land rental of $5,000, acquired for $300,000 the remaining Racine-Milwaukee line of 24 miles, which included in its appraised book value of $1,720,214 Transport Company cars 1111, 1113, 1118 and 1120, and duplex trains 1180–1181, 1182–1183, 1184-1185 plus line-car D-23. The Transport Company furthermore had guaranteed KMCL a salvage value of $181,000 - $73,000 for the Kenosha-Racine segment and $158,000 for the Racine-Milwaukee portion.

These dealings brought about a $1 million stockholder lawsuit against KMCL and the Transport Company, which charged its officers and directors with profiteering by underbidding the purchases. The court denied the affirmations, a decision later upheld after appeal to the Wisconsin Supreme Court.

On July 18, 1945, the Shore Line Transit Corporation of Indiana quietly purchased all of the outstanding KMCL stock.

On September 27, 1945, another interurban segment, the 28-mile Milwaukee-Port Washington line, was sold to KMCL for $142,000 (a $37,500 down payment, a $2,000 annual payment and a $3,900 annual land rental.) More rolling stock was included: cars 1139, 1140 and 1141, plus duplex trains 1186–1187, 1196–1197 and 1198-1199 plus line-car D-3 (ex D-23), M-1, 202, F250, F251 and F252, and section cars 40638 and 44037.

In December 1946, KMCL bought the 23-mile Milwaukee-Waukesha-Hales Corners rapid transit line for $325,000 ($37,500 down and $7,500 a year plus annual land rental of $18,600), with an additional agreement to pay trackage rights to the Transport Company for operations over Milwaukee streets. In this transaction, all the remaining Transport Company rolling stock was tendered to KMCL. (The Transport Company retained all real-estate ownership plus operating rights over the Milwaukee-West Junction trackage.) Throughout all these purchases by KMCL, the operational crews remained employees of the original company.

Following these dealings the Transport Company was able to realize tax deductions of $3,432,676 on the sales of its interurban lines. Bruner's total risk was $169,000.

Bruner told the Milwaukee Journal on May 22, 1947, that KMCL "would like to abandon passenger service as soon as possible." His petition to abandon the Kenosha-Milwaukee rapid transit line was granted in stages. The last Kenosha-to-Racine train left at 12:55 a.m. on September 13, 1947 (with Frank Hemmingsten as motorman and Carl Hansen, conductor) and service on the Racine-Milwaukee line ended when the last train left Racine at 10:15 p.m. on December 31, 1947. (Quin Valdes was the last motorman, and Emil Nichol the conductor.) The next day, all replacement bus service by Bruner's subsidiary company Milwaukee & Lake Shore Line was canceled following a 10.8-inch snowfall. The bus line was not a success and was given up within one year.

However, repeated attempts to abandon the Milwaukee-Waukesha-Hales Corner lines were denied, and Northland Greyhound acquired all KMCL stock on August 27, 1948. Northland Greyhound's initially stated intent to continue service but soon claimed losses of $20,000 per month and intent to abandon. (That line would instead be resold to become The Milwaukee Rapid Transit & Speedrail Company.)

The onset of increasing postwar automobile ownership led to continuing declines in bus service hours and profits. In the early 1960s the system - now Kenosha Motor Coach Company - was sold to Lakeshore Transit-Interurban and, in mid-1969, to longtime local school-service transit provider Pathfinder Lines, which finally ceased local transit service in February 1971. A successful citywide referendum then permitted the city of Kenosha to acquire and operate public transit service. City-operated transit service commenced with five routes in September 1971 with four gasoline-engined and one diesel-engined Twin Coach busses, supplanted by several used GMC diesel coaches purchased from Milwaukee and Janesville, Wisconsin (the latter gasoline-powered). The color-coded route designations were supplanted by a route-numbering system. By April 1975, 24 new GMC coaches (designated the 500 series) were introduced into service. By 1980 several new GMC Rapid Transit Series (RTS) coaches were added to the growing fleet. By the 21st century the active KAT bus fleet included buses built by Orion Bus Industries, Gillig (including several Gillig Phantoms), Nova Bus and Flxible. Today's fleet consists of Gillig and New Flyer buses.

Seven historic refurbished ex-Toronto Transit Commission and SEPTA streetcars have operated in the downtown Kenosha area since Saturday, June 17, 2000, on a 2-mile (3.2 km) loop between HarborPark and the Kenosha Metra station.

On March 23, 2020, Kenosha Area Transit suspended streetcar service due to the COVID-19 pandemic. Additionally, fare collection was suspended in order for riders to enter and exit buses through the rear door. In the beginning of the pandemic, buses were fogged nightly with a disinfectant and thoroughly wiped down and sanitized in high-contact areas. While streetcar service was suspended in 2020, bus operations were not and operated normally until August 2020 when riots occurred as a result of an officer-involved shooting of Jacob Blake.

== Policy ==
The City of Kenosha owns Kenosha Area Transit and operates it using public employees under the direct supervision of the City of Kenosha Department of Transportation. The policy-making body is the Kenosha Transit Commission, consisting of seven members appointed by the Mayor and confirmed by the Kenosha Common Council. The powers of the Transit Commission are substantial, including essentially all the powers necessary to acquire, operate and manage the system. The Kenosha Common Council has the ultimate responsibility for review and approval of certain matters, including the transit system's annual budget.

== Route list ==
Route #	Destination(s)
Route 1	Glenwood Crossings, Gateway Technical College, Festival Foods, UW-Parkside, Tremper High School
Route 2	Kenosha Market, Southport Plaza, Job Sery
Route 3	Indian Trail Academy, Festival Foods, Kenosha County Job Center
Route 4	Carthage College, Glenwood Crossings, St. Catherine's Commons, Meijer
Route 5	Glenwood Crossings, Indian Trail/Southport Plaza
Route 31	Southport Plaza, St. Catherine Hospital, Aurora Healthcare, Woodmans, Business Park of Kenosha, Kenosha County Detention Center, Amazon, ITA School

Route 6

== Connections to other transit systems ==
Kenosha Streetcar has a station directly across from the city's Metra station. There, riders can take the Union Pacific North Line to Chicago, Waukegan and northern Illinois suburbs. Coach USA's Wisconsin Coach Lines intercity buses stop near the Metra station entrance, connecting riders to Racine, Milwaukee, Waukesha and the O'Hare International Airport. Routes 2, 4, 30,31, 35 and 36 connect to Western Kenosha County Transit at Southport Plaza. KAT Route 1 used to connect to Belle Urban System's Route 9 at University of Wisconsin-Parkside, but that connection ended when Route 9 was discontinued.

== Ridership ==
	Ridership	Change over previous year
2013	1,319,931	n/a
2014	1,325,612	▲0.43%
2015	1,316,838	▼0.66%
2016	1,326,371	▲0.72%
2017	1,342,039	▲1.18%
2018	1,407,765	▲4.9%
2019	1,404,305	▼0.25%
2020	801,277	▼42.94%
2021	1,122,404	▲40.1%
2022	1,210,177	▲7.82%
2023	1,248,670	▲3.18%
2024	1,346,997	▲7.87%

== See also ==
- Streetcars in Kenosha, Wisconsin
