= Winthrop Harbor station =

Commuter rail station in Winthrop Harbor, Illinois

Winthrop Harbor

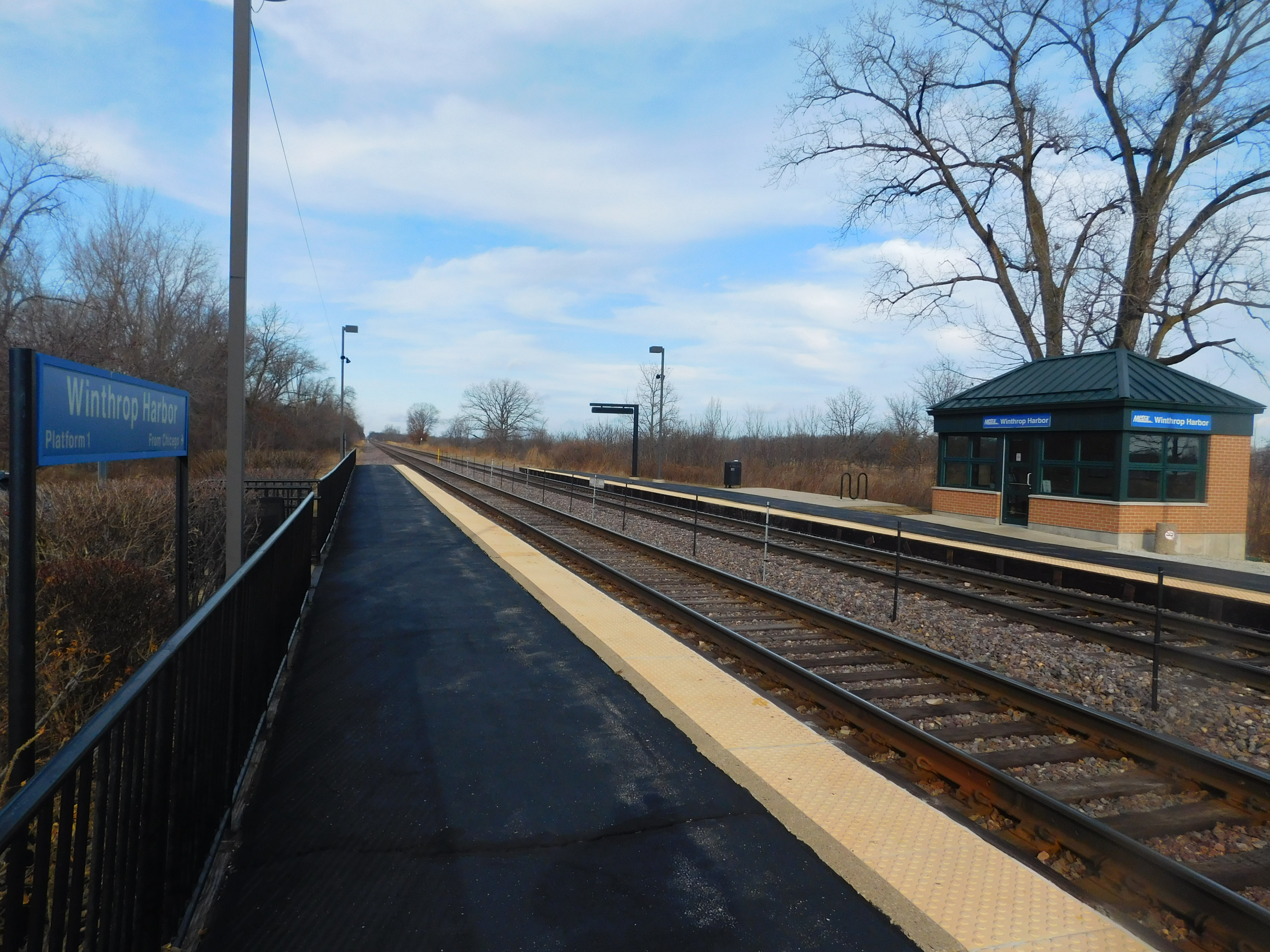
- Winthrop Harbor station in January 2019.

General information
- Location: 7th St., 1 block East of Ravine; Winthrop Harbor, Illinois
- Coordinates: 42.4826°N 87.8163°W
- Owner: Metra
- Platforms: 2 Side platforms
- Tracks: 2 tracks

Construction
- Parking: Yes
- Accessible: Yes

Other information
- Fare zone: 4

Passengers
- 2018: 59 (average weekday) ▼3.3%
- Rank: 206 out of 236

Services
Preceding station	Metra	Following station
Kenosha Terminus	Union Pacific North	Zion toward Ogilvie TC
Former services
Preceding station	Chicago and North Western Railway	Following station
Kenosha toward Milwaukee	Milwaukee Division	Camp Logan toward Chicago
Track layout
Location

Winthrop Harbor is a station on Metra's Union Pacific North Line located in Winthrop Harbor, Illinois. It is located on 7th Street, one block east of Ravine Drive. Winthrop Harbor is 44.5 miles (71.6 km) away from Ogilvie Transportation Center, the inbound terminus of the Union Pacific North Line. In Metra's zone-based fare system, Winthrop Harbor is in zone 4. As of 2018, Winthrop Harbor is the 206th busiest of Metra's 236 non-downtown stations, with an average of 59 weekday boardings.

Winthrop Harbor is located at grade level and has two side platforms that serve two tracks. It is the northernmost Metra station in the State of Illinois. A parking lot is situated on the west side of the station.

As of September 20, 2025, Winthrop Harbor is served by 19 trains (10 inbound, nine outbound) on weekdays, and by 16 trains (eight in each direction) on weekends and holidays.
