= Milwaukee Intermodal Station =

Intercity station in Milwaukee, Wisconsin, US

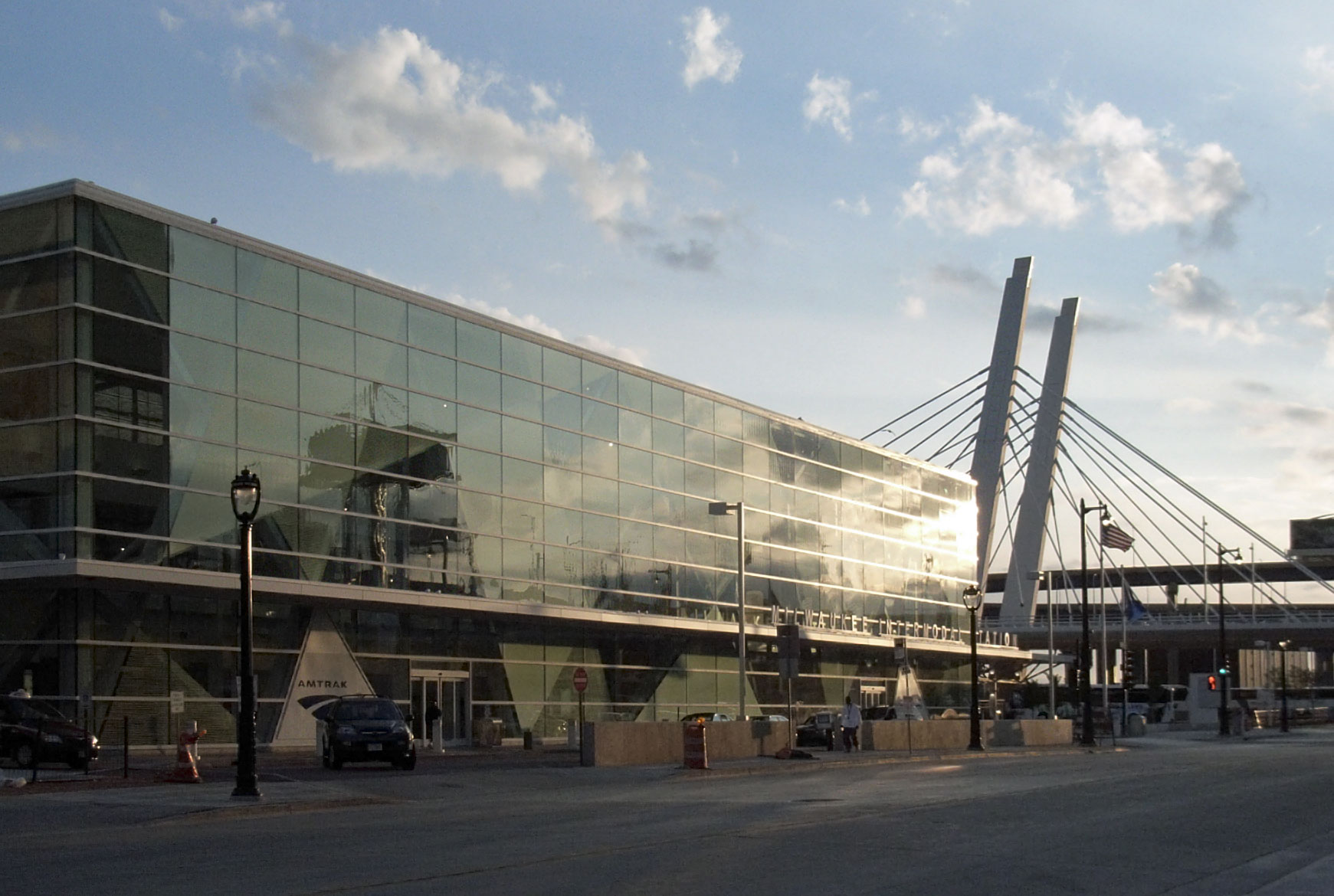
- Glass station building and 6th Street Bridge at sunset

General information
- Location: 433 West Saint Paul Avenue; Milwaukee, Wisconsin; United States
- Coordinates: 43°02′03″N 87°55′02″W
- Owner: Wisconsin Department of Transportation
- Operator: Amtrak
- Line: CPKC Watertown/C&M Subdivisions
- Platforms: 2 island and 1 side platform
- Tracks: 5
- Bus stands: 9
- Bus operators: Amtrak Thruway; Badger Bus; Greyhound Lines; Indian Trails; Jefferson Lines; Lamers Bus Lines; Megabus; Tornado Bus Company; Wisconsin Coach Lines
- Connections: Milwaukee Streetcar; Milwaukee County Transit System: BlueLine, 12, 31, 34, 57

Construction
- Parking: 425 long term spaces
- Cycle facilities: Bublr Bikes bike-share Outdoor bicycle parking
- Accessible: Yes

Other information
- Station code: Amtrak: MKE

History
- Opened: 1965
- Rebuilt: 2007
- Former names: Milwaukee Union Station (1965–2007)

Passengers
- FY 2025: 555,161 (Amtrak)

Services
Preceding station	Amtrak	Following station
Columbus toward St. Paul	Borealis	Milwaukee Airport toward Chicago
Terminus	Hiawatha	Milwaukee Airport toward Chicago
Columbus toward Seattle or Portland	Empire Builder	Glenview toward Chicago
Preceding station	The Hop	Following station
Terminus	M-Line	St. Paul at Plankinton toward Burns Commons
Former services
Preceding station	Amtrak	Following station
Columbus toward Duluth	North Star	Sturtevant toward Chicago
Columbus toward Seattle	North Coast Hiawatha	Glenview toward Chicago
Columbus toward Saint Paul–Midway	Twin Cities Hiawatha	Glenview toward Chicago
Preceding station	Milwaukee Road	Following station
Oconomowoc toward Minneapolis	Morning Hiawatha	Glenview toward Chicago
Oconomowoc toward Minneapolis	Fast Mail	Glenview toward Chicago
Terminus	Chicago – Milwaukee	Glenview toward Chicago
Wauwatosa toward Watertown	Suburban Service Watertown – Milwaukee	Terminus
Preceding station	Chicago and North Western Railway	Following station
Green Bay toward Ashland or Ironwood	Flambeau 400	Racine toward Chicago
West Bend toward Ishpeming	Peninsula 400	Racine toward Chicago
Terminus	Milwaukee Division	Racine toward Chicago
Track layout
Location

Milwaukee Intermodal Station is an intercity bus and train station in downtown Milwaukee, Wisconsin. Amtrak service at Milwaukee includes the daily Empire Builder, the daily Borealis, and the six daily Hiawatha round trips. It is Amtrak's 18th-busiest station nationwide, and the second-busiest in the Midwest, behind only Chicago Union Station. The station is served by bus companies Coach USA - Wisconsin Coach Lines (regional and intercity services), Greyhound Lines, Jefferson Lines, Indian Trails, Lamers, Badger Bus, Tornado Bus Company, and Megabus. It is also the western terminus of the M-Line service of The Hop streetcar.

The Wisconsin Department of Transportation owns the station and platforms. The DOT's Statewide Traffic Operations Center is on the 3rd floor of the station. The station has 2 island platforms and 1 side platform, which serve the two main tracks of the Canadian Pacific Kansas City C&M Subdivision plus three platform sidings.

== History ==
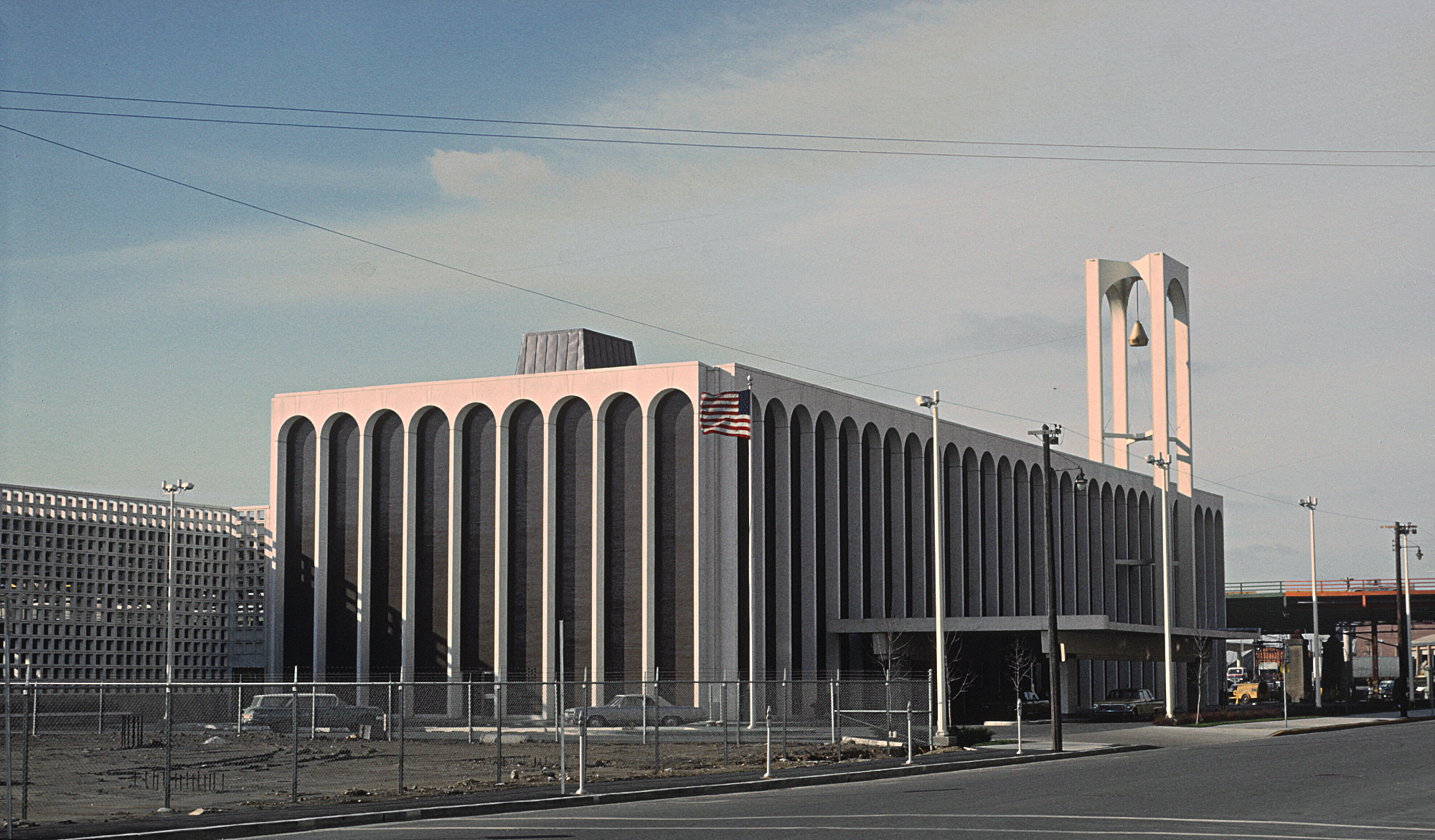
The original Milwaukee Union Station, soon after its opening in 1965

The station opened on August 3, 1965, as Milwaukee Union Station. Operated by the Milwaukee Road, it replaced the previous Everett Street Depot. The depot was built on West St. Paul Avenue in a modernistic style that proved unpopular quickly after it was erected. The Chicago and North Western Railway closed its Milwaukee station (Lake Front Depot) and moved its passenger operations to the new Milwaukee Road depot in 1966. Following the formation of Amtrak in 1971, the Chicago and North Western withdrew all of its inter-city trains and commuter service from the station. The Canadian Pacific Railway (through its Soo Line Railroad subsidiary) acquired the trackage within the train shed when it bought the remnants of the Milwaukee Road in 1986. CP merged with the Kansas City Southern Railway on April 14, 2023 to form Canadian Pacific Kansas City Limited.

In November 2007, the facility was renamed the Milwaukee Intermodal Station following a $16.9 million renovation. The new facility included a larger waiting area with a glass atrium and improved space for Amtrak ticketing, as well as facilities for intercity buses (to accommodate Greyhound service after it relocated from its former location at 7th and Michigan), a restaurant, and retail space. In 2016, the Wisconsin Department of Transportation completed a rebuild of the train shed and platform to meet federal accessible standards.

The Hop streetcar service began on November 2, 2018, with a stop on Vel R. Phillips Avenue just northeast of the station.

This station has been chosen as the northern terminus in various forms of the proposed Kenosha–Racine–Milwaukee regional rail service.
