= Kenosha station =

Commuter rail station in Kenosha, Wisconsin

Kenosha

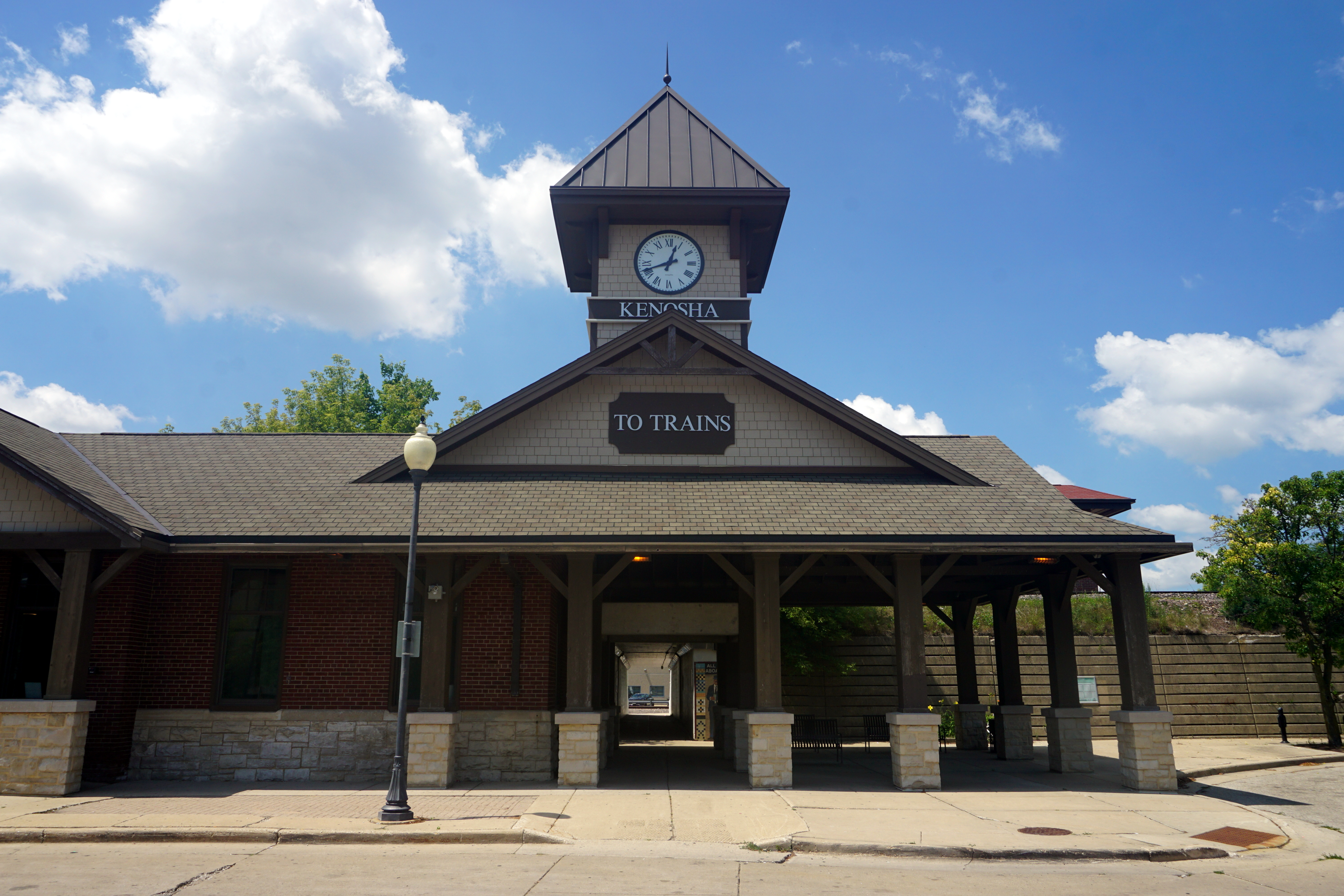
- Station entrance

General information
- Location: 5414 13th Avenue; Kenosha, Wisconsin
- Coordinates: 42.5859°N 87.8258°W
- Owner: Union Pacific Railroad
- Line: UP Kenosha Subdivision
- Platforms: 1 island platform
- Tracks: 4
- Connections: Kenosha Streetcar; Kenosha Area Transit

Construction
- Structure type: Elevated
- Parking: Yes
- Accessible: Yes

Other information
- Fare zone: 4

History
- Opened: 1855
- Rebuilt: 2004–2006

Passengers
- 2018: 345 (avg. weekday) ▲25%
- Rank: 135 out of 236

Services
Preceding station	Metra	Following station
Terminus	Union Pacific North	Winthrop Harbor toward Ogilvie TC
Former services
Preceding station	Chicago and North Western Railway	Following station
Racine toward Minneapolis	Chicago – Minneapolis via Milwaukee	Waukegan toward Chicago
Racine toward Milwaukee	Milwaukee Division	Winthrop Harbor toward Chicago
Pleasant Prairie toward Rockford	KD Line Closed 1939	Terminus
Track layout
Location

Kenosha is a railroad station in Kenosha, Wisconsin, United States, served by Metra's Union Pacific North Line. It is the northern terminus of the line, which runs south to Ogilvie Transportation Center in Chicago. Kenosha is the only Metra station outside of Illinois and is 51.6 miles (83.0 km) from the Ogilvie Transportation Center. The City of Kenosha partially subsidizes the station's service due to its location outside the jurisdiction of the Northern Illinois Transit Authority (NITA). It is the northernmost station of the Metra system, making it the most northern station in the entire NITA network. As of 2018, Kenosha is the 135th busiest of Metra's 236 non-downtown stations, with an average of 345 weekday boardings.

It is the only passenger station in Kenosha County, since Amtrak's closest station is in Sturtevant.

The station is linked to Kenosha's streetcar line, which stops on the far side of the station's parking lot.

As of September 20, 2025, Kenosha is served by 19 trains (10 inbound, nine outbound) on weekdays and by 16 trains (eight in each direction) on weekends and holidays. There is a small coach yard at Kenosha where trainsets are stored overnight and on weekends, as well as a Union Pacific maintenance facility.

== History ==
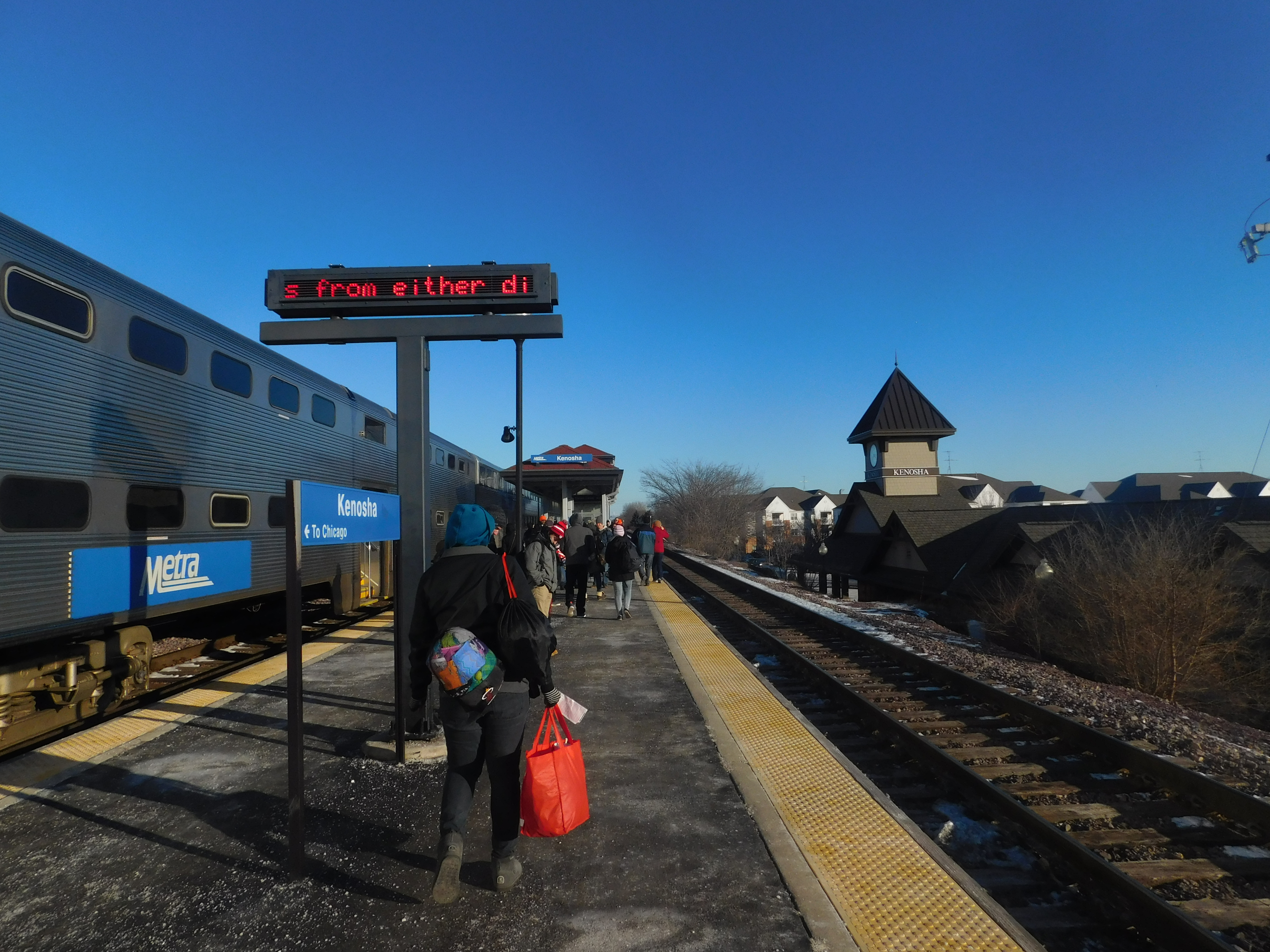
Kenosha station platform

The station was opened in 1855 by the Chicago and Milwaukee Railway and was acquired by the Chicago and North Western Railway in 1869. The station served many C&NW trains, such as the Twin Cities 400, Flambeau 400, Shoreland 400, Valley 400, and Peninsula 400. The last intercity passenger train stopped in Kenosha in 1971; since then it has only been used for commuter services. Other commuter services extended from Chicago into Wisconsin but were eventually discontinued. The KD Line ran from Kenosha to Harvard and closed in 1939. The Northwest Line had a branch to Williams Bay that was cut back to Lake Geneva in 1966 and discontinued north of the state line in 1975. The Milwaukee Road had commuter service to Walworth until 1982, when it was cut back to Fox Lake.

Though Kenosha Station pre-dates the Civil War, it was restored in the period between 2004 and 2006. Metra does not have a ticket office there, and the waiting room serves as a dining area for a fast food restaurant.

The station has been chosen as the southern terminus of various forms of the proposed Kenosha–Racine–Milwaukee regional rail service, first in the KRM Commuter Link proposal from 2010 (with cross-platform transfers to Metra), then later in the Wisconsin Transit & Realty proposal from 2022.

== Transit connections ==
- Kenosha Area Transit
- Kenosha Streetcar
- Coach USA (Wisconsin Coach Lines) - Kenosha-Racine-Milwaukee Route
