= West Bend station =

Historic railroad in West Bend, Wisconsin

West Bend
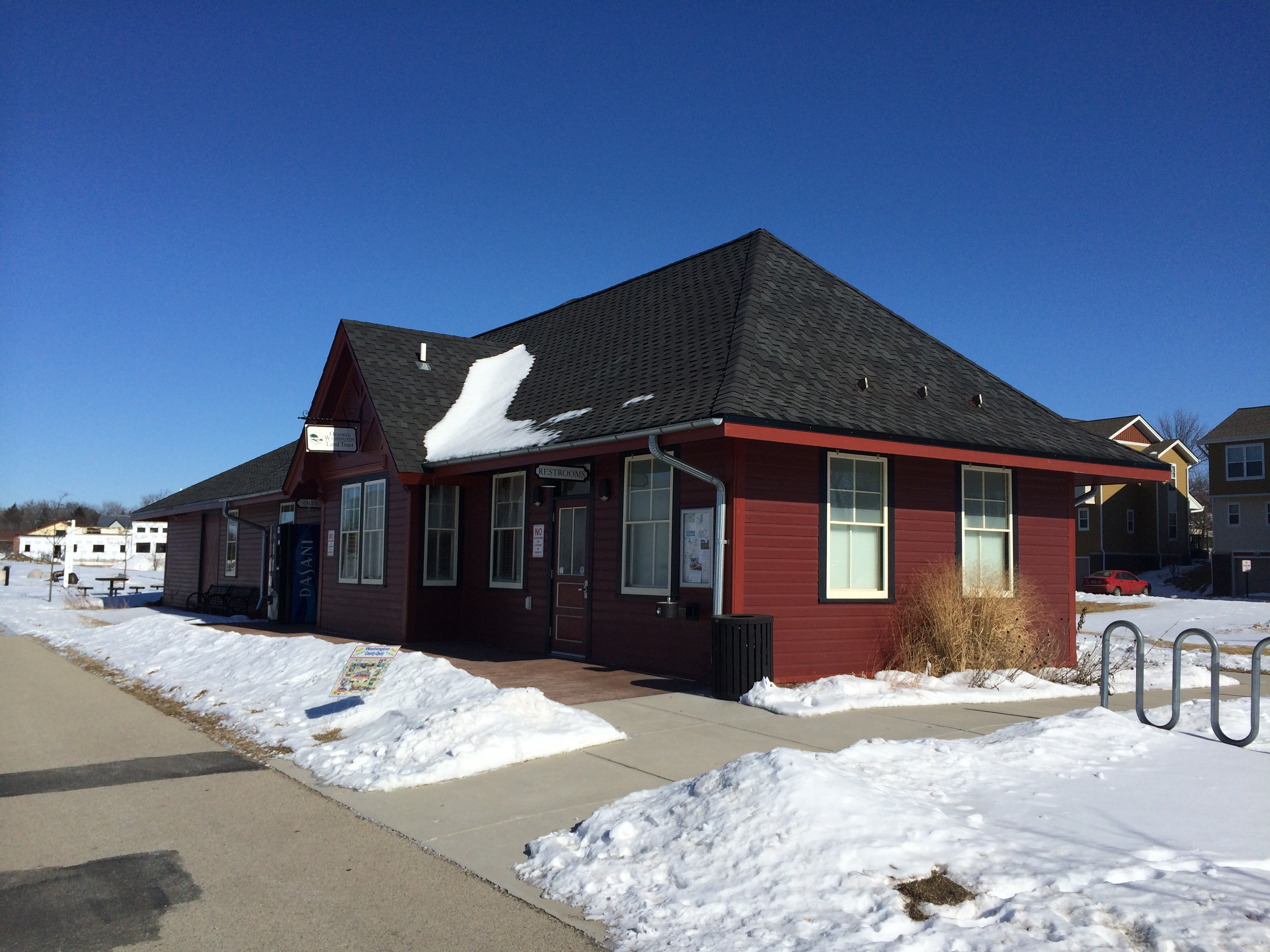
- The depot in 2015

General information
- Location: Veterans Ave. at Willow Ln., West Bend, Wisconsin
- Coordinates: 43°25′28″N 88°10′52″W
- System: Former Chicago and North Western Railway station

Construction
- Structure type: At-grade
- Architect: Frost & Granger
- Architectural style: Craftsman

History
- Opened: 1900

Services
Preceding station	Chicago and North Western Railway	Following station
Kewaskum toward Ishpeming	Ishpeming – Milwaukee	Jackson toward Milwaukee
- West Bend Chicago and North Western Depot
- U.S. National Register of Historic Places
- Location within Wisconsin Location within the United States
- Location: Veterans Ave. at Willow Ln., West Bend, Wisconsin
- Coordinates: 43°25′28″N 88°10′52″W
- Area: less than one acre
- Built: 1900
- Architect: Frost & Granger
- Architectural style: Craftsman
- NRHP reference No.: 08000789
- Added to NRHP: August 19, 2008
Location

The West Bend station, otherwise known as the West Bend Chicago and North Western Depot is a historic railroad station in West Bend, Wisconsin. The depot was designed in 1900 by the firm Frost and Granger in the Craftsman style for the Chicago and North Western Railway (C&NW). It is a variation of the C&NW "Number One" combination depot design. Passenger service to the depot ended in 1971, with the creation of Amtrak.

The depot was added to the National Register of Historic Places on August 19, 2008.
