= Car 553 =

Privately owned commuter rail car

553
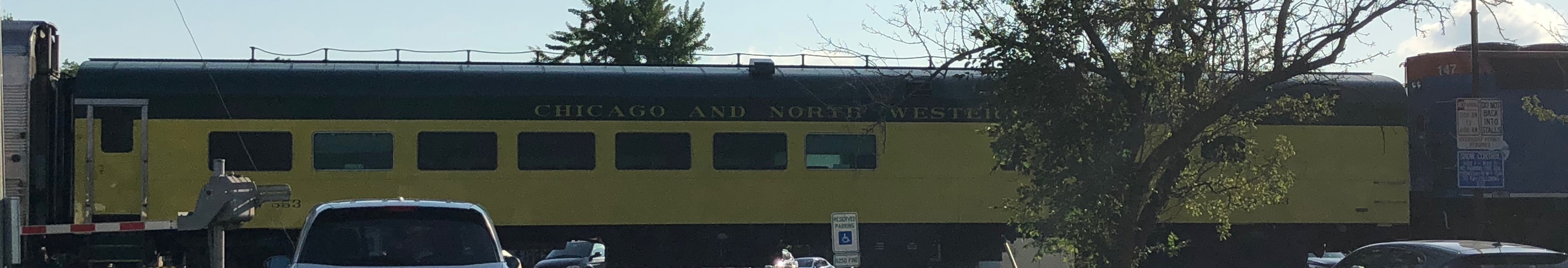
- Car 553 leaving Ravinia station in Highland Park, Illinois on June 29, 2018, in its original C&NW paint scheme.
- Manufacturer: American Car and Foundry Company
- Constructed: 1949
- Refurbished: 1961

Specifications
- Track gauge: 4 ft 8 1/2 in (1,435 mm) standard gauge

Car 553 was a privately owned railroad passenger car. It operated exclusively on Metra's Union Pacific North Line in Northeastern Illinois, and was the last membership-based commuter rail car operating in the United States.

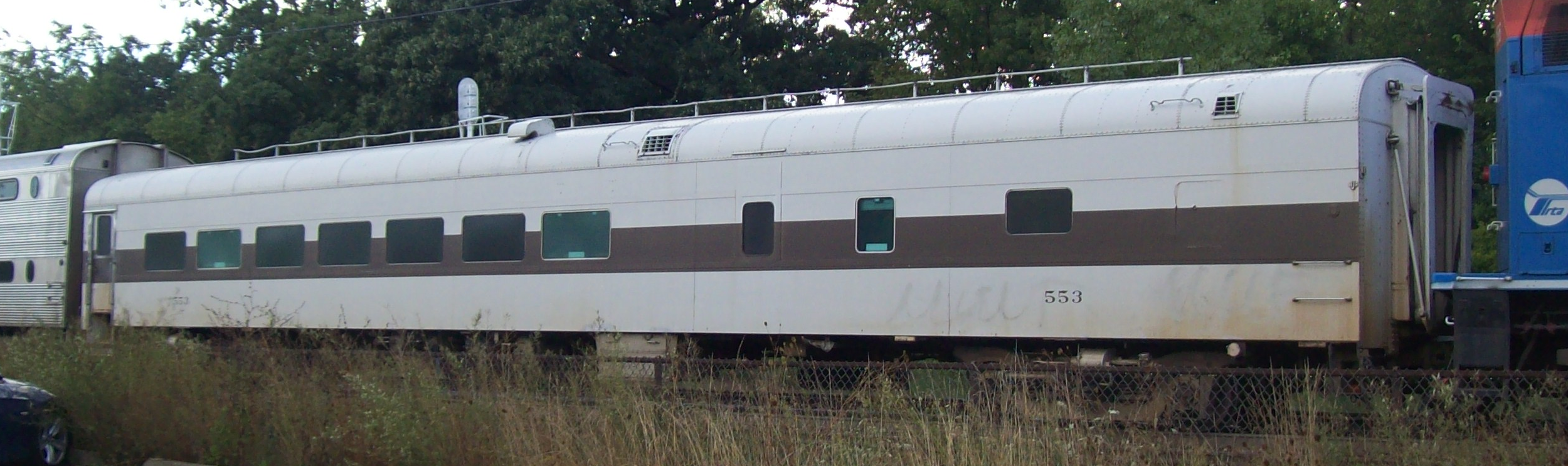
Car 553 in Lake Bluff, Illinois on August 20, 2012, in its former paint scheme

== History ==
Private commuter car service originally began on the Chicago and North Western Railway in 1929 to serve wealthy commuters in the affluent North Shore suburbs of Chicago. The first private car was C&NW 6700 and was named "The Deerpath".

Car 553 was originally built for the Chicago and North Western Railway in 1949 by the American Car and Foundry Company as car 7901. It was originally used as a lounge and barbershop car on City of Los Angeles, a long-distance train service between Chicago and Los Angeles. In 1961, car 7901 was rebuilt for commuter service and renumbered 553. On November 30, 1975, the car was acquired by Commuter Associates Inc. and continued to see service on the C&NW, operated by the commuter rail branch of the Regional Transportation Authority (which was reorganized into Metra in 1984). In the 1990s, the first female members purchased seats on the car. Car 553 still wore the brown and white color scheme of the pre-Metra Regional Transportation Authority's passenger equipment until late 2017 when it was restored to its original C&NW yellow and green colors and lettering.

== Metra service ==
Prior to 2022, Car 553 operated twice daily on the Union Pacific North Line between Chicago and Kenosha, Wisconsin. The car operated as part of an agreement between club members and the Union Pacific Railroad (which operates Metra trains on the UP North Line). While in the past, membership had been restricted exclusively to wealthy "North Shore" families, membership was subsequently open to anyone. The membership price varied depending on the boarding station, but ranged from $550 to $850 per calendar quarter. The car arrived at Ogilvie Transportation Center around 8:00 am and departed for Kenosha shortly after 5:30 pm.
