= Streetcars in Kenosha, Wisconsin =

Streetcar system

Kenosha Streetcars
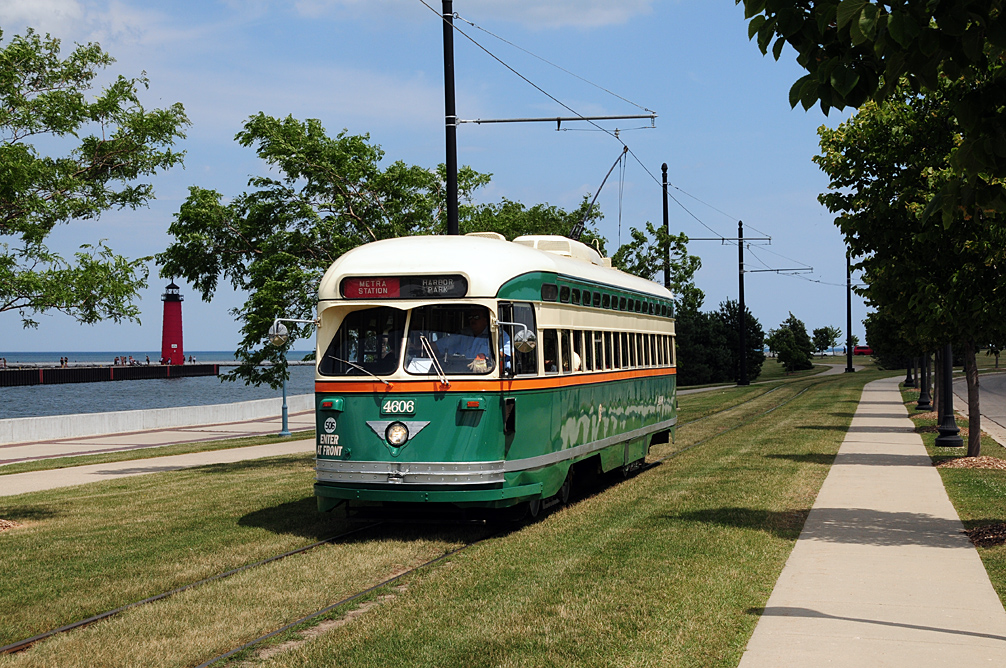
- A PCC streetcar touring HarborPark

Overview
- Locale: Kenosha, Wisconsin
- Transit type: Heritage streetcar
- Number of lines: 1
- Number of stations: 17

Operation
- Began operation: June 17, 2000
- Operator: Kenosha Transit

Technical
- System length: 1.7 mi (2.7 km)
- Track gauge: 4 ft 8 1/2 in (1,435 mm) standard gauge
- Electrification: Overhead line, 600 V DC

Streetcars were part of the public transit service in Kenosha, Wisconsin, in the first third of the 20th century, and returned to this role in the year 2000.

== Kenosha Electric Railway ==
The first Kenosha Electric Railway (KERy) was a street railway serving the city of Kenosha, Wisconsin, United States, from February 3, 1903, through February 14, 1932. Throughout these 29 years of service, the system operated Birney Safety Cars. Although it had several owners, the original name was used throughout its history and is still attached to the current streetcar line in Kenosha. In 1932 the Kenosha system was converted to electric trolley buses, making Kenosha an early user of these vehicles for all transit operations (both Ipswich and Darlington in the UK converted entirely to trolley buses in 1926). Kenosha also utilized color-coding for transit routes, a more common practice in horsecar days but used by Glasgow on its electric cars from the beginning.

== Modern streetcar line ==
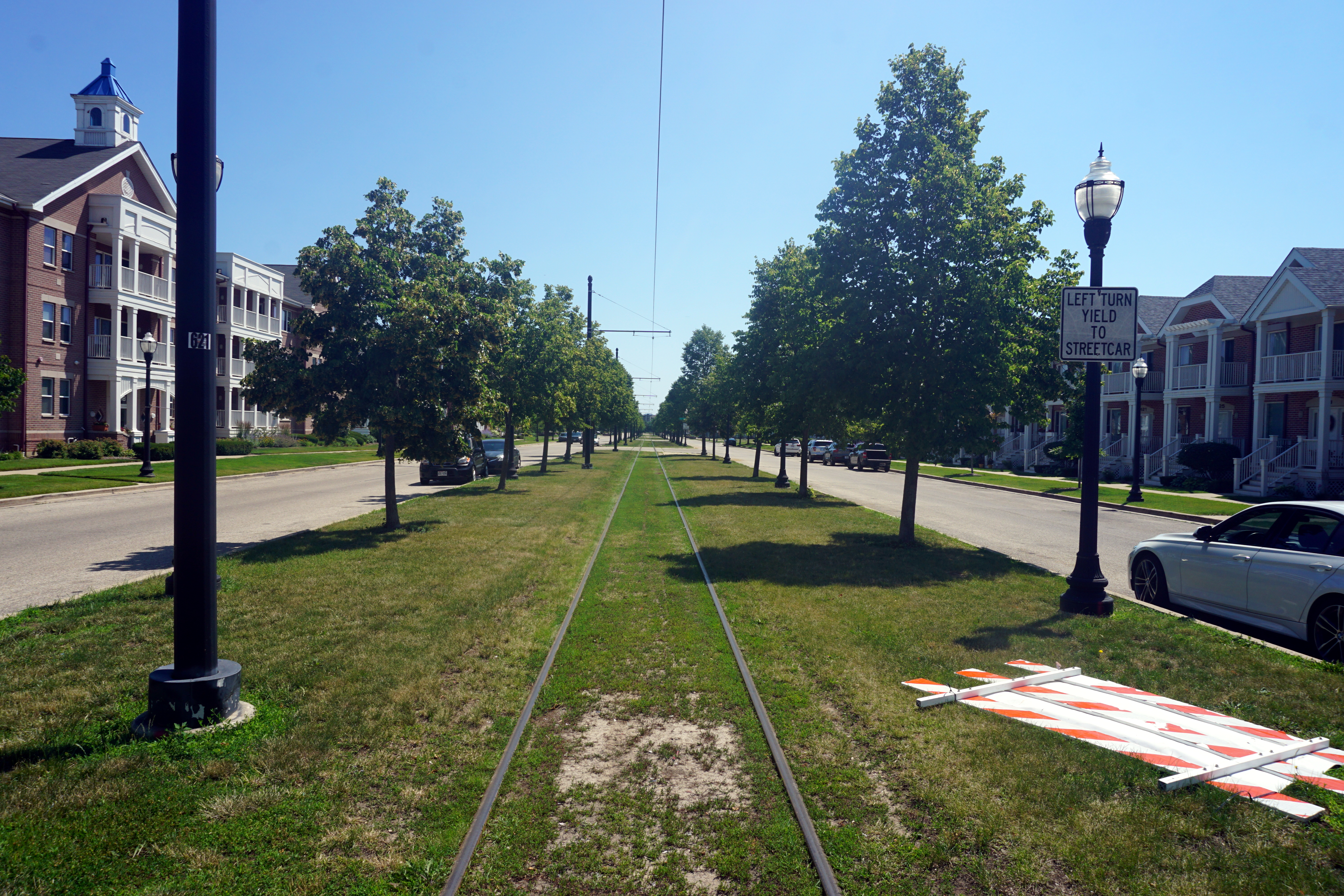
Green streetcar tracks in Kenosha

At the turn of the 21st century, Kenosha constructed a modern electric streetcar system utilizing historic PCC streetcars in coordination with the HarborPark development on the shores of Lake Michigan. The line has become a model project studied by urban planners worldwide, and is used by thirty percent of visitors to Kenosha.

Installation of the tram track sub-base was completed in the autumn of 1998 and utilized crushed concrete from the foundations of the 1870-era Simmons Bedding Company/American Motors Corporation office and plant buildings east of Fifth Avenue. As the new streets in HarborPark were completed in the fall of 1999, crews installed new 115-pound-per-yard (57 kg/m) continuously welded rail streetcar track over modern concrete ties (except for standard wooden ties under grade crossings). Electric overhead line construction for 600-volt direct current was completed in April 2000 and energized by a modern solid state substation.

Kenosha's six historic 'Red Rocket' PCC A15-class streetcars were built in Fort William, Ontario (now part of Thunder Bay, Ontario) for the Toronto Transportation Commission (predecessor of the current Toronto Transit Commission) in 1951 by the Canadian Car and Foundry Company under license from the Transit Research Corporation, holder of the PCC car patents, and using car bodies manufactured by the St. Louis Car Company that were shipped to Canada and remanufactured and rebodied from the windows down in 1991. Each Kenosha car is painted in a unique livery (paint scheme) representing an historic North American transit system that also operated PCC streetcars. The first of Kenosha's streetcars was 4610 'Toronto' (originally 4541), delivered on Thursday, May 4, 2000. The six other cities and systems thereby represented include 4606 (Chicago Surface Lines), 4609 (Pittsburgh Railways Company), 4615 (Johnstown Traction Company), 4616 (Cincinnati Street Railways), 4617 San Francisco Municipal Railway, and 2185 Southeastern Pennsylvania Transportation Authority.

The ceremonial dedication of the streetcar line and the new Transit Center was held on June 17, 2000, and the memorial ribbon was broken at 11 a.m. by 4610 'Toronto', piloted by Richard Lindgren who had been a motorman for the original Kenosha Electric Railway (KERy) in 1932.

Public rides began immediately after the opening ceremony. Regularly scheduled service started two days later, on Monday morning, June 19, 2000.

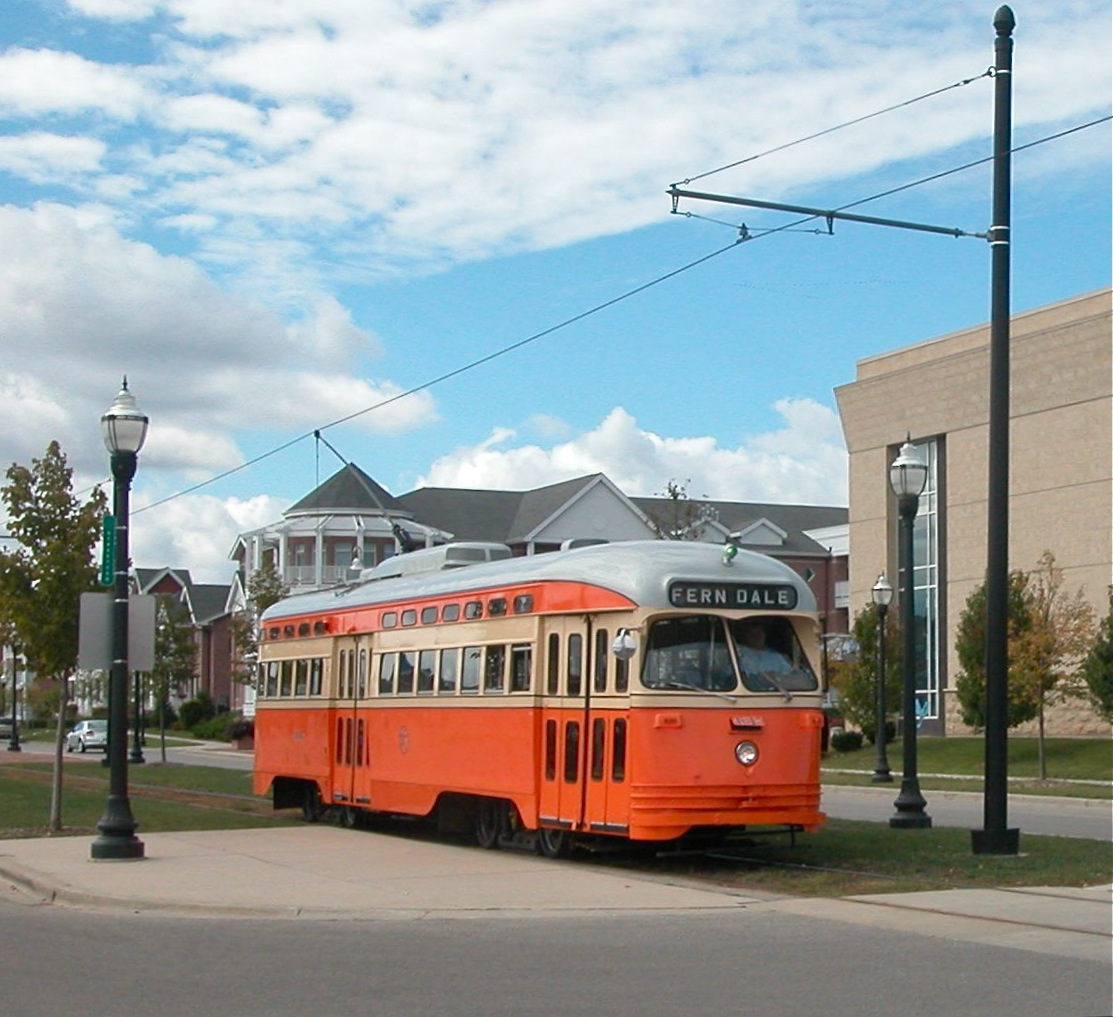
Car 4615 in a Johnstown tribute paint scheme in 2005

In addition to its utilitarian purpose, the streetcar system (along with Metra service) has played a major role in the downtown's transit-oriented development (TOD) and immediately became one of Kenosha's top tourist attractions. In December 2005, the City Council voted to study expansion of the current two-mile downtown route (which currently carries over 63,000 passengers yearly) to the city's southwest and through the Uptown business district.

Kenosha's HarborPark Plan, which is served by the streetcar line, comprises over 400 upscale urban housing units and retail, commercial, restaurant and recreational facilities. The streetcar circulator project demonstrates the feasibility of reintroducing zero-emission electric transit into mid-west cities and the application of special short-haul transit applications.

In October 2011, the city of Kenosha received a gift of two more PCC streetcars purchased and donated by John DeLamater. Car 4617 arrived on Oct 10, and Car 2185 arrived on Oct. 12. These two cars were previously at the East Troy Electric Railroad which had found them unsuitable to its needs. 4617 was built for Toronto in 1951, and finished at the Canadian Car and Foundry with a shell provided by the St. Louis Car Company, one of 19 cars rebuilt for Toronto in 1986. Car 2185 was built in 1948 for the Philadelphia Transport Company by the St. Louis Car Company. Rebuilt in the mid-1980s, it saw service for SEPTA until 1992, when it was acquired by the East Troy line in 1994.

In 2014, the Kenosha city council voted to approve an additional north–south crosstown line, but the expansion was cancelled in 2015 due to unanticipated cost overruns.

== See also ==
- Kenosha Transit, operator of the streetcar circulator as well as Kenosha's bus system.
- Heritage streetcar
- Streetcars in North America
- Light rail in the United States
