= Wisconsin Coach Lines =

American commercial intercity bus service

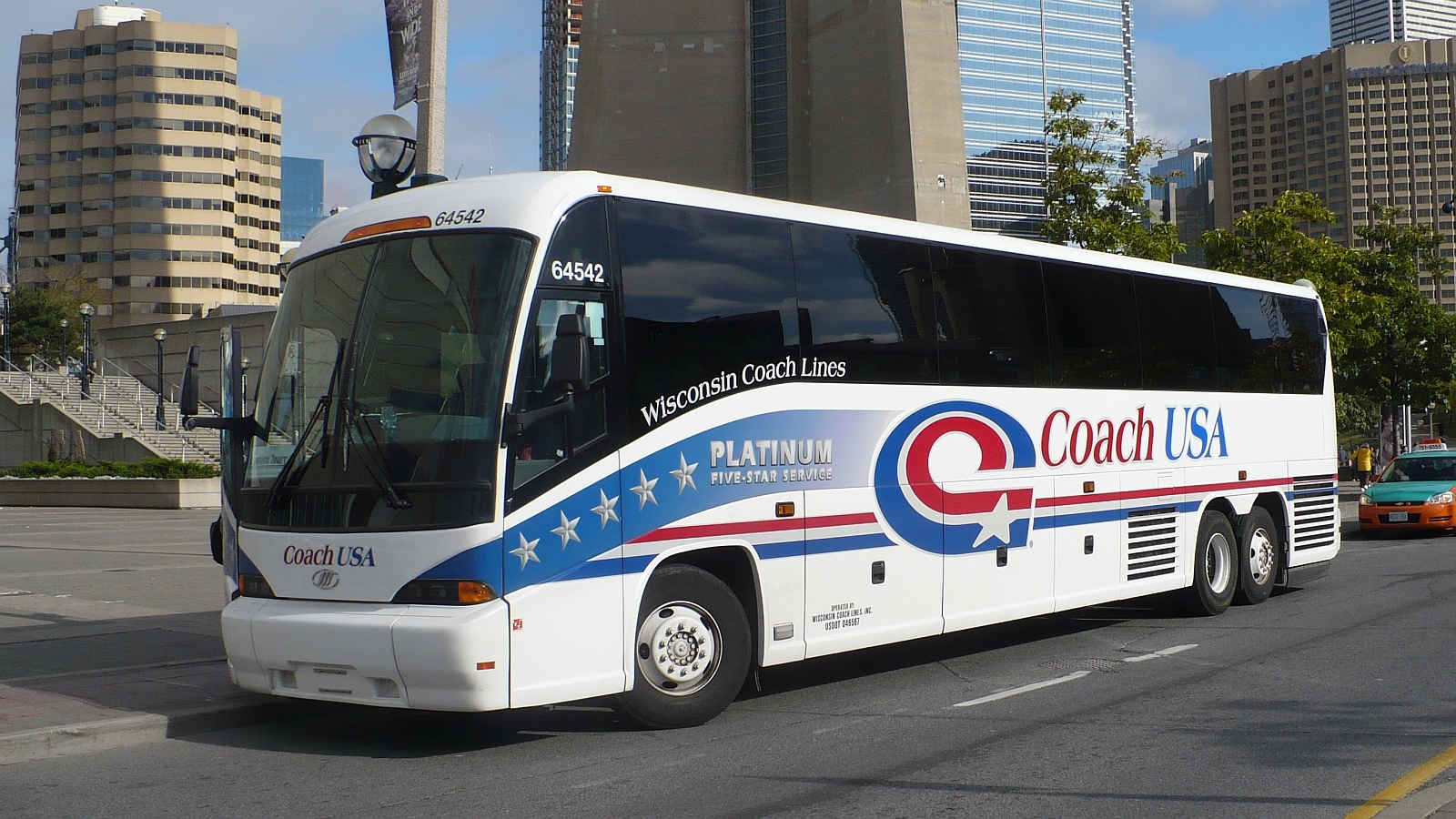
- Wisconsin Coach Lines MCI J4500 #64542 operates in charter service.
- Parent: Coach USA
- Founded: 1941
- Headquarters: 1520 Arcadian Avenue; Waukesha, Wisconsin
- Service area: southeastern Wisconsin
- Service type: public transit, airport express, charter coach
- Alliance: Greyhound Lines, Megabus
- Routes: 8 fixed routes
- Operator: Wisconsin Coach Lines
- Website: Coach USA - WCL

Wisconsin Coach Lines is a commuter bus service, charter coach service and intercity carrier based in Waukesha, Wisconsin. WCL was founded in 1941 as Waukesha Transit Lines. It has been a subsidiary of Coach USA since 1998. Coach USA has been owned by Renco Group since 2024.

== Overview ==
Airport Express operates 15 times daily to O'Hare Airport (ORD), and Mitchell Airport (MKE) from Waukesha, Milwaukee, Racine, and Kenosha.

Within Wisconsin WCL operates one daily bus route between Milwaukee, Racine, and Kenosha under contract from Racine and Kenosha counties, and 4 commuter routes between Waukesha County and downtown Milwaukee as a subcontractor to Waukesha Metro Transit, which manages routes for Waukesha County. WCL operates bi-weekly service between Milwaukee and University of Wisconsin-Whitewater, under contract from the school.

WCL also provides private charter bus service throughout the United States and Canada.

== Route detail ==
Wisconsin Coach Lines operates 8 fixed route services within southeast Wisconsin, listed below. Not included are Dairyland Bus services.

Route	Terminals		Also serving	Fare zones (if applicable)	Notes
Kenosha- Milwaukee	Kenosha; 63 Street and 22 Avenue	Milwaukee Intermodal Station	Racine, Caledonia, Milwaukee Mitchell International Airport	Mitchell Airport, Racine County line, Kenosha County line	
Airport Express	Waukesha; Goerkes Corner Park-and-Ride (Connect with Waukesha Metro)	Chicago; Airports	Milwaukee, Racine, Kenosha	By city	Serves O' Hare and Mitchell International Airports.
UW- Whitewater	University of Wisconsin–Whitewater	Milwaukee; Intermodal Station	Waukesha and Brookfield	None	Friday getaway and Sunday return service only for UWW students.
Summerfest	Delafield; I-94, exit 287 park and ride	Milwaukee; Henry Maier Festival Park	Pewaukee, Brookfield	N/A	Seasonal service for Summerfest.; Via Goerkes Corner park-and-ride
Wisconsin State Fair	Delafield; I-94, exit 287 park and ride	West Allis; Wisconsin State Fair Park	Pewaukee, Brookfield	N/A	Seasonal service for Wisconsin State Fair.; Via Goerkes Corner park-and-ride
901	Waukesha; Downtown Transit Center	University of Wisconsin–Milwaukee; Mitchell Hall	Brookfield, West Allis, Milwaukee	None	Weekday bidirectional service only; Operates via Wisconsin Avenue in Milwaukee; Subsidized by Waukesha Metro Transit; Via Goerkes Corner park-and-ride
904	Oconomowoc; City Hall	Milwaukee; Wisconsin Avenue and Cass Street	Pewaukee, Hartland, Brookfield	Goerkes Corner park-and-ride, I-94 exit 297	Weekday rush hour service only; To Milwaukee AM and from Milwaukee PM; 1 trip each way only; Via Wisconsin Avenue in Milwaukee; Subsidized by Waukesha Metro Transit
905	Oconomowoc; City Hall	Milwaukee; Wisconsin Avenue and Cass Street	Delafield	Meadowbrook park and ride, I-94 exit 291	Weekday rush hour service only; Via Wisconsin Avenue in Milwaukee; Subsidized by Waukesha Metro Transit
906	Mukwonago; WIS 83 Exit 43 Park-Ride, I-43	Milwaukee; Downtown Loop	Big Bend and New Berlin	Big Bend park and ride, I-43 exit 50	Weekday rush hour service only; To Milwaukee AM and from Milwaukee PM; Via Wells Street and Michigan Street in Milwaukee; Subsidized by Waukesha Metro Transit

== See also ==
- Proposed Kenosha–Racine–Milwaukee regional rail service
