= Proposed Kenosha–Racine–Milwaukee regional rail service =

Potential 33-mile rail service

Kenosha–Racine–Milwaukee rail service
Overview
- Service type: Regional rail
- Status: Study underway
- Locale: Metro Milwaukee
- Predecessor: Chicago & North Western Milwaukee Division passenger trains
- Ridership: 1.89 million (projected) (Note: 2009 KRM Commuter Link study)

Route
- Termini: Milwaukee Intermodal Station; Kenosha Metra station
- Stops: 9
- Distance travelled: 33 mi (53 km)
- Average journey time: 52 minutes
- Service frequency: 14 daily roundtrips

Technical
- Track gauge: 1,435 mm (4 ft 8 1/2 in) standard gauge
- Operating speed: 59 mph (95 km/h) (top); 38 mph (61 km/h) (average)
- Track owners: CPKC, Union Pacific

Multiple proposals have been made for a 33-mile (53 km) regional rail service connecting Milwaukee, Racine, and Kenosha in the state of Wisconsin, previously referred to as KRM, and currently being studied as MARK.

== History ==
=== KRM Commuter Link ===
In 1998, the Southeastern Wisconsin Regional Planning Commission found the creation of a 33-mile (53 km) rail service through Milwaukee, Racine, and Kenosha to be feasible. In 2005, the state of Wisconsin created a temporary regional transit authority covering Milwaukee, Racine, and Kenosha for stewarding the project, but the temporary RTA did not have authority to operate or construct the proposed service.

In 2009, the Wisconsin Legislature passed legislation allowing the creation of regional transit authorities, including the Southeastern Regional Transit Authority (SERTA), which would be responsible for KRM Commuter Link. Milwaukee, Racine, and Kenosha Counties were part of SERTA, while Waukesha, Ozaukee, and Washington Counties opposed being included.

The proposed KRM service would have had stops in downtown Milwaukee, southern Milwaukee, Cudahy, South Milwaukee, Oak Creek, Caledonia, Racine, Somers, and Kenosha, with new stations constructed at all stops but downtown Milwaukee, Racine, and Kenosha, and with transfers with Metra available in Kenosha. Metra rejected a proposal to operate the service as a northward extension of its Union Pacific North Line, but in a November 2010 meeting with SERTA, it expressed willingness to line up its schedules with that of the KRM Commuter Link.

On May 3, 2011, the Legislature's budget committee repealed the legislation that allows regional transit authorities to exist. On July 25, 2011, SERTA had its final meeting, ending its plans for the service. Federal funding for the service was reallocated to the creation of express bus routes for the Milwaukee County Transit System.

KRM Commuter Link service would have started in 2017 with a projected annual ridership of 1.89 million, with operational costs supported by SERTA's authority to levy an up-to-$18 tax on rental cars.

=== Post-SERTA era ===
In August 2022, the Wisconsin Department of Transportation sponsored private company Wisconsin Transit and Reality Group's request for federal funding to implement the service, but after acceptance into the Federal Transit Administration's New Starts program, the application was withdrawn due to insufficient private funding.

In 2023, a passenger rail service following the proposed alignment was included in the Wisconsin Department of Transportation's draft of its Wisconsin Rail Plan 2050 report.

As of November 2023, the cities of Milwaukee, Racine, and Kenosha were collaborating to update the studies from the KRM Commuter Link proposal in preparation for potentially funding the service with a combination of a federal grant and tax increment financing around stations.

=== Milwaukee Area–Racine–Kenosha (MARK) ===
On December 5, 2025, the Milwaukee Area–Racine–Kenosha (MARK) Passenger Rail Commission held its inaugural meeting. The commission is proposing an inter-city rail service that would run along the same proposed alignment as the previous KRM Commuter Link proposal, but with fewer stations and faster service speeds.

== See also ==
- Hiawatha proposed extensions
- Union Pacific North Line
- Milwaukee Road Cannonball
