= Lake Front Depot =

Coordinates: 43°02′20.2″N 87°53′59.0″W

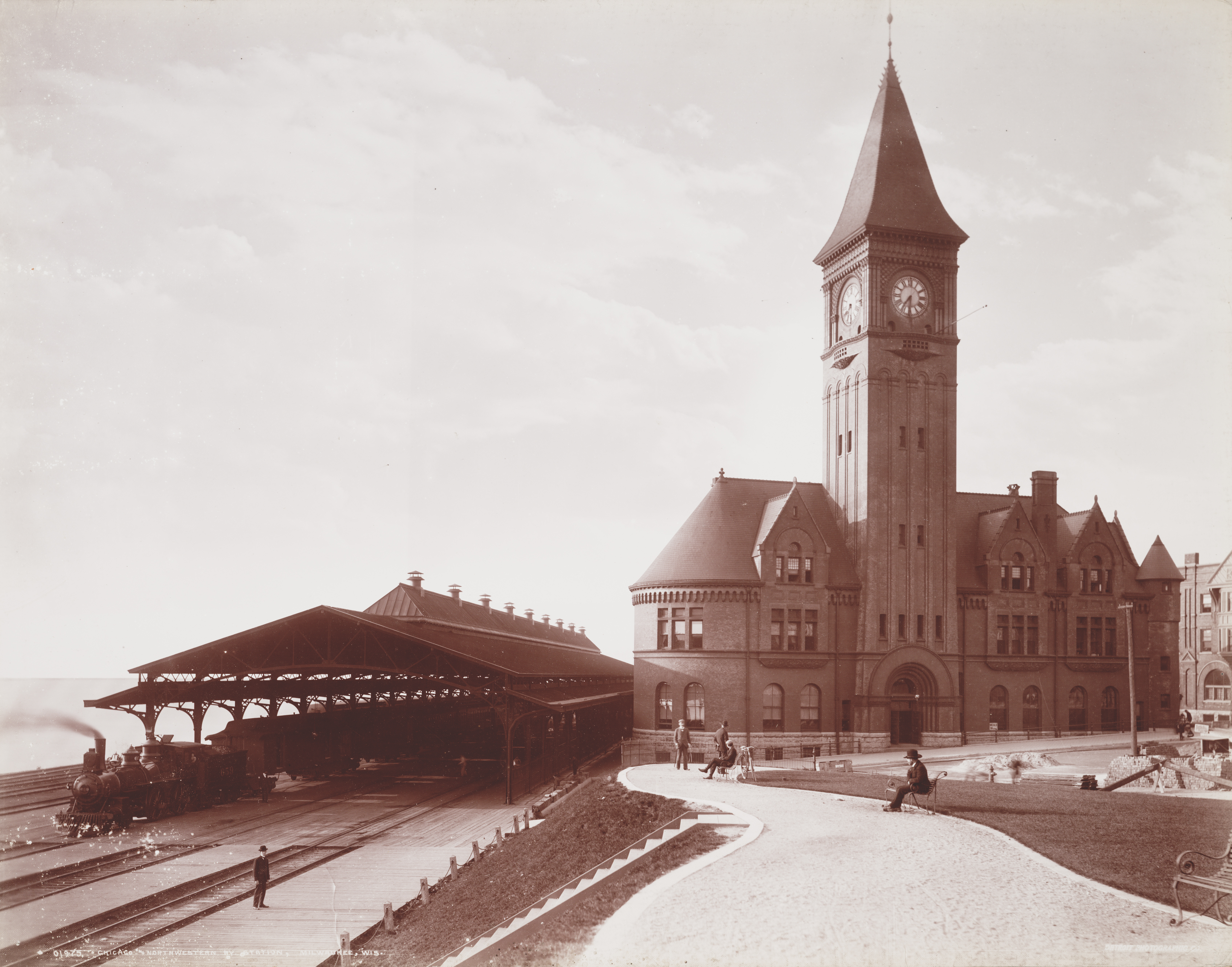
- The depot as it appeared in the 1890s

General information
- Location: 918 East Wisconsin Avenue, Milwaukee, Wisconsin 53202
- Owner: Chicago and North Western Railway
- Line: Kenosha Subdivision Waukesha Subdivision Shoreline Subdivision

History
- Opened: 1889
- Closed: May 15, 1966

Former services
Preceding station	Chicago and North Western Railway	Following station
Butler toward Minneapolis	Chicago – Minneapolis via Milwaukee	Racine toward Chicago
Terminus	Milwaukee Division	National Avenue toward Chicago
National Avenue toward Madison	Madison – Milwaukee	Terminus
Granville toward Ishpeming	Ishpeming – Milwaukee	Terminus
Fox Point toward Green Bay	Green Bay – Milwaukee via Sheboygan	Terminus
Location

The Lake Front Depot was a train station in Milwaukee, Wisconsin built in 1889–1890 by the Chicago and North Western Railway (C&NW). It was located near the shore of Lake Michigan at the end of East Wisconsin Avenue, by today's Milwaukee County War Memorial. The structure was built with stone in the Romanesque style, and had a tall clock tower which reached 234 feet (71 m) high. The depot cost $200,000 ($7.17 million in 2025) to build at the time, and eventually served 98 trains a day.

Chicago and North Western owned the depot until 1964 when Milwaukee County bought the structure and surrounding land for $7 million ($72.7 million in 2025), with the intent to use the land for a freeway. C&NW continued to use the depot until May 15, 1966 when trains were moved to the new Union Station (now the Milwaukee Intermodal Station) after it was built by the Chicago, Milwaukee, St. Paul and Pacific Railroad (Milwaukee Road). The Milwaukee Road had itself vacated its old Everett Street Depot the previous year.

The Lake Front Depot lasted two more years until 1968. Some efforts were made to save the building from being torn down, but they were unable to raise the needed money. Estimates ranged from $325,000 ($3.01 million in 2025) to restore the structure to $575,000 ($5.32 million in 2025) to move it to another location.

Many of the C&NW's "400 " trains served this station starting in 1935. In the early days of the Twin Cities 400, the steam locomotives which pulled the train were exchanged at the Milwaukee station. The engines ran at such high speeds on the route from Chicago to Minneapolis–Saint Paul that some components in the drivetrain couldn't withstand the 410-mile (660 km) trip. The railroad eventually got the exchange process down to a very quick five minutes.

Other trains to serve the depot included the Flambeau 400, Peninsula 400, and Valley 400.
