= Kenilworth station (Illinois) =

Commuter rail station in Kenilworth, Illinois

Kenilworth

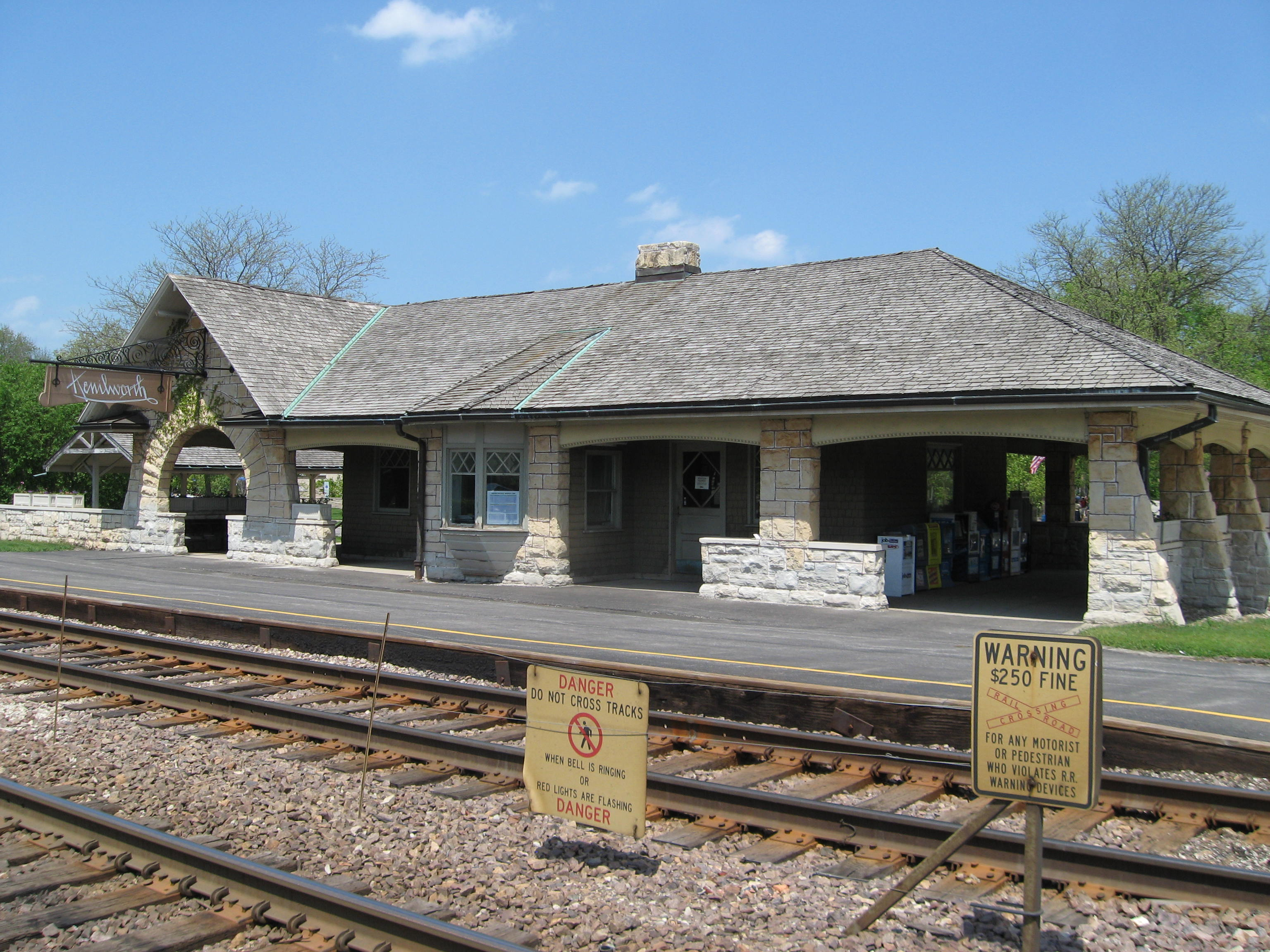

General information
- Location: 400 Richmond Road; Kenilworth, Illinois 60043
- Coordinates: 42.08644°N 87.71665°W
- Platforms: 2 side platforms
- Tracks: 2
- Connections: Pace Buses

Construction
- Platform levels: 1
- Parking: Yes
- Accessible: Yes

Other information
- Fare zone: 3

History
- Opened: 1891

Passengers
- 2018: 501 (average weekday) ▲0.2%
- Rank: 98 out of 236

Services
Preceding station	Metra	Following station
Indian Hill toward Kenosha	Union Pacific North	Wilmette toward Ogilvie TC
Former services
Preceding station	Chicago and North Western Railway	Following station
Indian Hill toward Milwaukee	Milwaukee Division	Wilmette toward Chicago
Track layout
Location

Kenilworth is a commuter railroad station in Kenilworth, Illinois, a small and affluent village in the North Shore area of Chicago. Metra's Union Pacific North Line trains go south to Ogilvie Transportation Center in Chicago and as far north as Kenosha, Wisconsin. In Metra's zone-based fare schedule, Kenilworth is in zone 3. As of 2018, Kenilworth is the 98th busiest of Metra's 236 non-downtown stations, with an average of 501 weekday boardings.

The station is on Kenilworth Avenue between Green Bay Road and Richmond Road. Northbound trains stop on the west platform, and southbound trains stop on the east platform. Travel time to Ogilvie ranges from 28 minutes on express trains to 38 minutes on local trains. It is also across the street from the Kenilworth Village Hall, which has the Green Bay Trail in the front yard.

As of September 20, 2025, Kenilworth is served by 56 trains (28 in each direction) on weekdays, and by all 30 trains (15 in each direction) on weekends and holidays. During the summer concert season, an extra weekend train to Ravinia Park station also stops here.

The station was built in 1891 by the Chicago and North Western Railway to a design by architect Franklin Pierce Burnham of the firm Edbrooke and Burnham.

== Bus connections ==
Pace

- 213 Green Bay Road (Monday-Saturday only)
