= Glencoe, Illinois =

Village in the United States

- Village
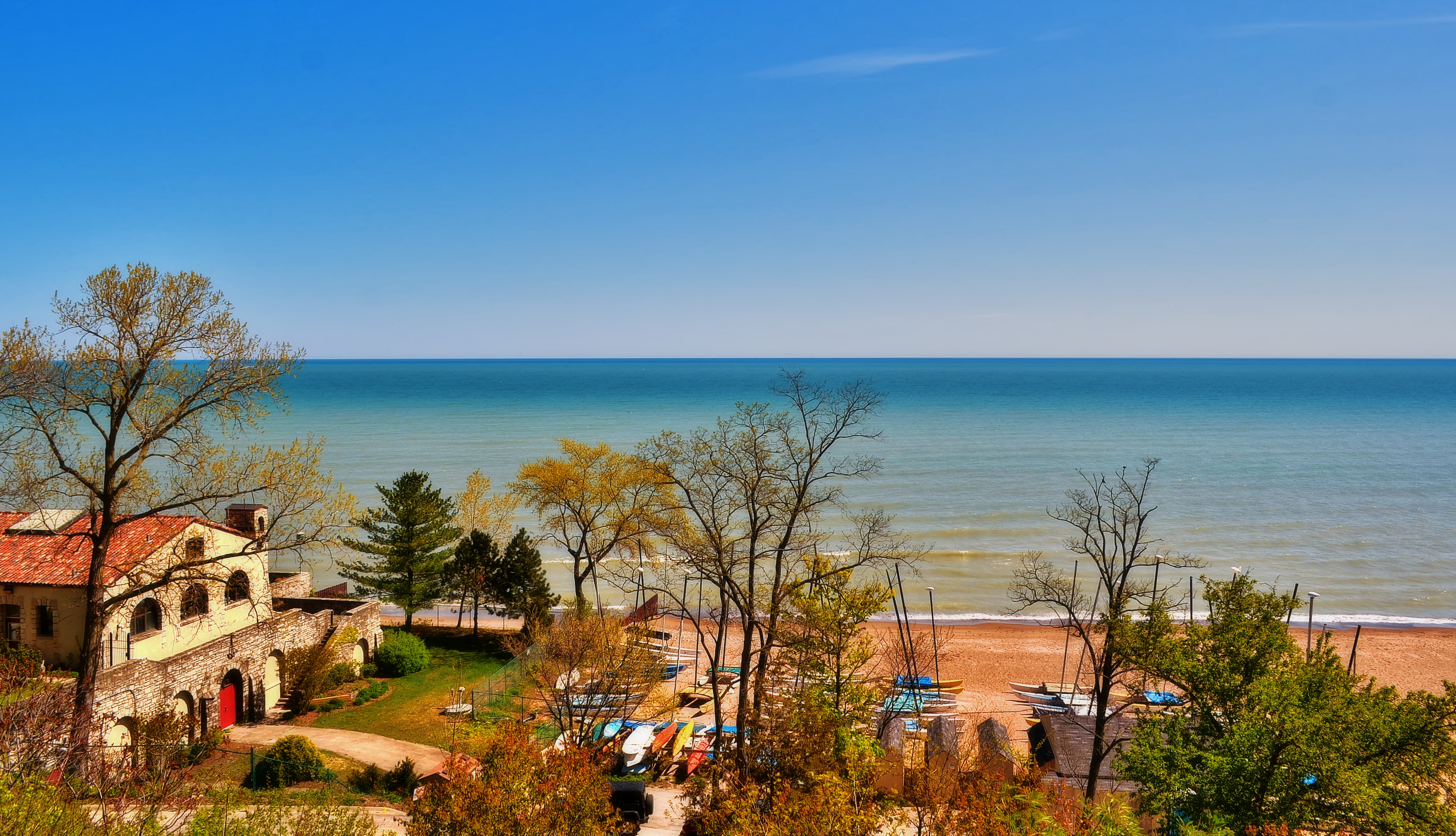
- View of Lake Michigan

- Seal

- Location of Glencoe in Cook County, Illinois.

- Location within Greater Chicago Location within Illinois Location within the United States
- Coordinates: 42°7′53″N 87°45′39″W
- Country: United States
- State: Illinois
- County: Cook
- Township: New Trier
- Incorporated: 1869

Government
  - Type: Council-manager
  - President: Howard Roin

Area
  - Total: 3.78 sq mi (9.79 km^{2})
  - Land: 3.72 sq mi (9.63 km^{2})
  - Water: 0.062 sq mi (0.16 km^{2}) 1.59%

Population (2020)
  - Total: 8,849
  - Density: 2,380/sq mi (918.9/km^{2})
- ZIP code(s): 60022, 60093 (southeast corner), and 60062 (small commercial area in the southwest)
- Area code(s): 847 and 224
- Geocode: 29652
- FIPS code: 17-29652
- Website: www.villageofglencoe.org

Glencoe (/ˈɡlɛnˌkoʊ/) is a lakefront village in northeastern Cook County, Illinois, United States, 21 miles (34 km) north of downtown Chicago. As of the 2020 census, the population was 8,849. Glencoe is part of Chicago's North Shore and one of the wealthiest communities in Illinois. Based on 2023 census data, the median household income in Glencoe was $250,001 making it the second wealthiest Illinois ZIP code.

== History ==
Opinions differ about the origins of the village's name. Some attribute it to an early resident, Matthew Coe. Others say it is named for the area of Scotland of the same name. It developed in the late 19th century around a railroad stop. Former Chicago mayor Walter S. Gurnee had become president of the line connecting Chicago and Milwaukee, and often bought up and developed land around railroad stops. Thus, one historian believes the name derives from the maiden name of Gurnee's wife, since Gurnee bought the land in 1867 and began subdivision, although financial problems prevented him from building a home there and he returned to New York for his final years. The village's first seal was based on the seal of Glencoe, Scotland.

During the late 19th and early 20th centuries, many elegant homes were built in Glencoe. Most notably, the village is home to the world's third largest collection of Frank Lloyd Wright structures: the Ravine Bluff subdivision contains seven houses, a concrete bridge and three sculptural markers. There are also two larger, individually built homes, located nearby Ravine Bluffs. In addition to Wright, there are houses designed by Howard Van Doren Shaw, David Adler, Robert E. Seyfarth and George Washington Maher, Benjamin Marshall, among others. Writers Theater was designed by Jeanne Gang.

Glencoe has had an African American population since almost immediately after the Village's 1869 incorporation.[Images of America, Glencoe Illinois, Ellen Kettler Paseltiner and Ellen Schubert for the Glencoe Historical Society p. 8]. Many in the Black and Italian community lived within a five-square block area near what is now Vernon Avenue from Washington to Jackson streets. Homes in this area were close together in accordance with the city planner's 20-foot wide alleys. In 1920 the city of Glencoe condemned these properties to clear land for a park.[Glencoe Historical Society Exhibition]

In 1920 the African American community in Glencoe grew to 676 residents. The African American population in 1930 numbered 313 members and 176 in the 2000 census.

Homer Wilson was the first Black property owner in Glencoe. He went on to mortgage his home to found the St. Paul AME Church which is still active in Glencoe under the leadership of Katrese Kirk McKenzie. Glencoe beaches were not integrated until 1942 when a court injunction allowed the sale of beach passes for the (formerly white-only) Park Avenue beach to the family that requested them, A.L. Foster, his wife, Mildred and their two sons who lived at 379 Jefferson.

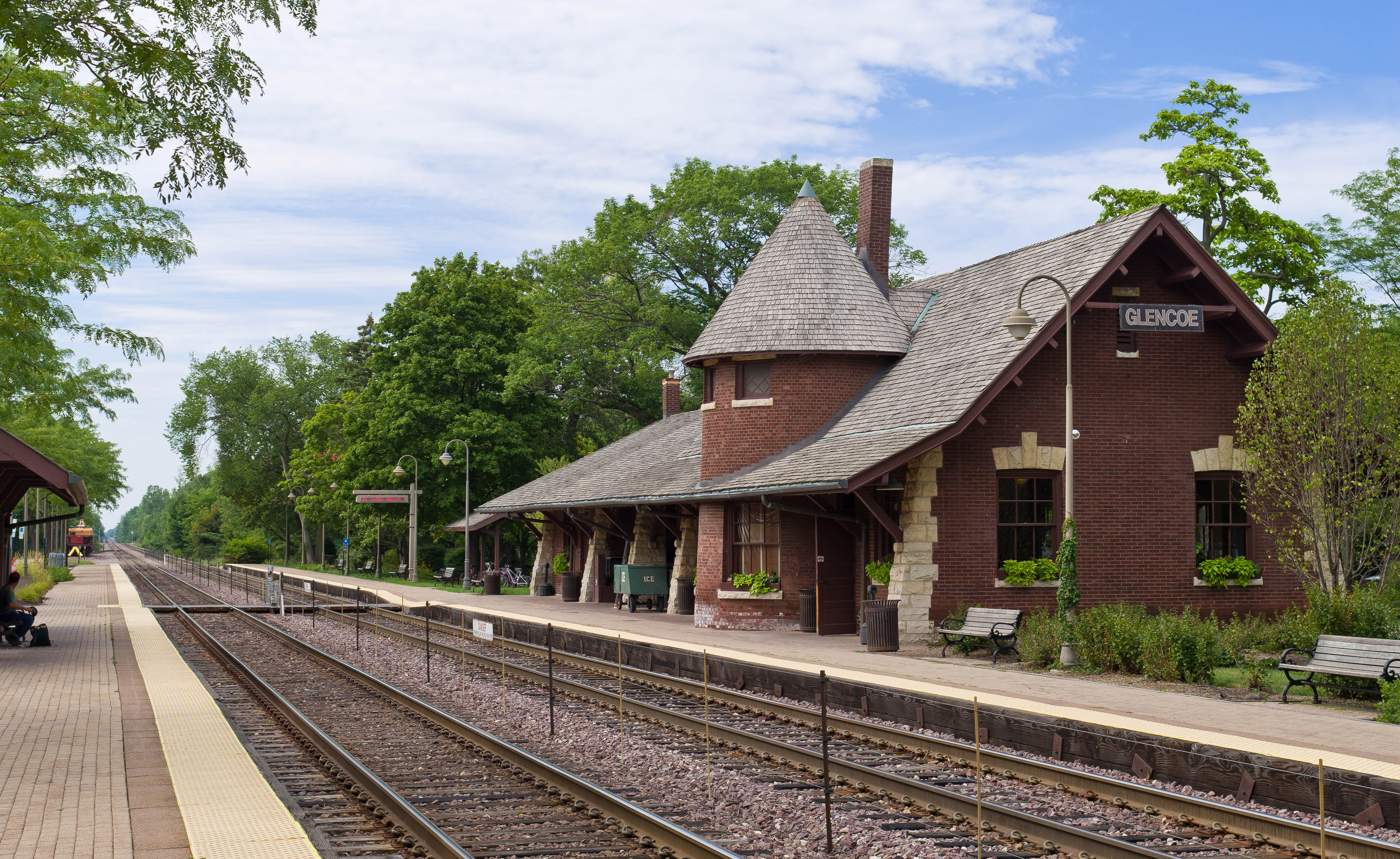
Glencoe Metra Station in 2012

Glencoe has a Village Manager form of government. It had one of the first public safety departments (combined police/fire/paramedic). In 1921 Glencoe adopted the first zoning code in Illinois. Its land-use plan, adopted in 1940, has been adhered to with minor changes since then. For example, eminent domain law was used to condemn homes of the Black and Italian residents to make way for a new park next to South School. The allowed uses outlined on the 1940 zoning map is predominantly a single-family residential area, with no industrial uses. It has a small cohesive central business district that provides most basic services, including post office, library, Village Hall, performing arts theatre, train station (to Chicago), and other shopping needs.

== Geography ==
Glencoe has a total area of 3.78 square miles (9.79 km^{2}), of which 3.72 square miles (9.63 km^{2}) (or 98.39%) is land and 0.06 square miles (0.16 km^{2}) (or 1.61%) is water.

Glencoe is located on the west side of Lake Michigan. It is separated from suburbs to the north and west by more than 1,200 acres (490 ha) of the Cook County Forest Preserve natural forest area. Three golf clubs also buffer it, with the private Lake Shore Country Club on the north, the public Glencoe Golf Club (operated by the village of Glencoe) on the northwest, and the private Skokie Country Club on the west.

Although nominally within Glencoe geographically, the Chicago Botanic Garden sits at the upper northwest corner of the village but is technically outside the village limits.

The village is surrounded on three sides by upper-income communities, with Highland Park on the north, Northbrook on the west, and Winnetka to the south. The Skokie Lagoons are located in the forest preserve to the immediate west of the village. The same forest preserve has a bicycle trail that connects to other forest preserves to the south. In the village, the Green Bay Trail allows bicyclists to travel as far south as Wilmette and north past Lake Forest. The highest point of elevation in Glencoe is 690 feet (210 m) above sea level along Green Bay Road in the northern part of the village.

Glencoe's southern border with Winnetka cuts through 58 homes, forcing homeowners to pay taxes to and seek permits from both villages. The two villages began discussing a solution in 1920s, reaching a tentative agreement in 2007 in which each homeowner could choose a village from which to receive services while the boundary officially remained unchanged. Initially, 46 homeowners chose Winnetka, but the others had the option to choose a village later. The boundary was later updated to reflect these choices.

== Demographics ==
Historical population
Census	Pop.	Note	%±
1880	387		—
1890	569		47.0%
1900	1,020		79.3%
1910	1,899		86.2%
1920	3,381		78.0%
1930	6,295		86.2%
1940	6,825		8.4%
1950	6,980		2.3%
1960	10,472		50.0%
1970	10,542		0.7%
1980	9,200		−12.7%
1990	8,499		−7.6%
2000	8,762		3.1%
2010	8,723		−0.4%
2020	8,849		1.4%
U.S. Decennial Census

=== Racial and ethnic composition ===
Glencoe village, Illinois – Racial and ethnic composition Note: the US Census treats Hispanic/Latino as an ethnic category. This table excludes Latinos from the racial categories and assigns them to a separate category. Hispanics/Latinos may be of any race.
Race / Ethnicity (NH = Non-Hispanic)	Pop 2000	Pop 2010	Pop 2020	% 2000	% 2010	% 2020
White alone (NH)	8,239	8,024	7,635	94.03%	91.99%	86.28%
Black or African American alone (NH)	176	105	92	2.01%	1.20%	1.04%
Native American or Alaska Native alone (NH)	4	5	8	0.05%	0.06%	0.09%
Asian alone (NH)	147	234	377	1.68%	2.68%	4.26%
Pacific Islander alone (NH)	0	1	0	0.00%	0.01%	0.00%
Other race alone (NH)	9	13	38	0.10%	0.15%	0.43%
Mixed race or Multiracial (NH)	79	109	327	0.90%	1.25%	3.70%
Hispanic or Latino (any race)	108	232	372	1.23%	2.66%	4.20%
Total	8,762	8,723	8,849	100.00%	100.00%	100.00%

=== 2020 census ===
As of the 2020 census, Glencoe had a population of 8,849. The median age was 43.7 years. 28.3% of residents were under the age of 18 and 17.2% of residents were 65 years of age or older. For every 100 females there were 98.0 males, and for every 100 females age 18 and over there were 94.3 males age 18 and over.

100.0% of residents lived in urban areas, while 0.0% lived in rural areas.

There were 2,992 households and 2,563 families in Glencoe. Of all households, 43.4% had children under the age of 18 living in them, 76.1% were married-couple households, 7.6% were households with a male householder and no spouse or partner present, and 14.3% were households with a female householder and no spouse or partner present. About 12.7% of all households were made up of individuals and 8.3% had someone living alone who was 65 years of age or older.

The population density was 2,341.62 inhabitants per square mile (904.10/km^{2}). There were 3,176 housing units at an average density of 840.43 per square mile (324.49/km^{2}). Of those housing units, 5.8% were vacant. The homeowner vacancy rate was 1.7% and the rental vacancy rate was 8.9%.

=== Income and poverty ===
The median income for a household in the village was $195,600, and the median income for a family was $250,001. Males had a median income of $136,111 versus $66,384 for females. The per capita income for the village was $121,589, placing Glencoe among the 20 wealthiest communities in the United States.

== Arts and culture ==
=== Points of interest ===
- Chicago Botanic Garden
- Cook County Forest Preserves
- Frank Lloyd Wright-designed Sylvan Road Bridge (concrete; 1915 design)
- Frank Lloyd Wright-designed Ravine Bluffs Subdivision entry light/planter monuments at Sylvan/Franklin and at Franklin/Meadow (circa 1915)
- Am Shalom Synagogue
- North Shore Congregation Israel synagogue designed by Minoru Yamasaki
- Glencoe Metra station (circa 1891)
- Glencoe Beach
- Glencoe Sailing Beach
- Glencoe Historical Society
- Skokie Lagoons
- St. Paul A.M.E. Church
- Writers Theatre

=== Library ===
Glencoe is served by the Glencoe Public Library. The original library was located in the former Hawthorne School. A new library opened in 1941.

== Education ==
Glencoe School District 35 is an elementary school district based in Glencoe. It includes three schools: South School (for kindergarten through second grade), West School (for third and fourth grade) and Central School (for fifth through eighth grade). All schools are located within Glencoe boundaries.

Glencoe is a part of New Trier Township High School District, which maintains campuses in the neighboring communities of Northfield (for freshmen) and Winnetka (for grades 10th to 12th).

== Media ==
Local media covering news in Glencoe include The Glencoe Anchor, Winnetka-Glencoe Patch, TribLocal and Pioneer Press. The Free Press, a social scientific book publisher, was founded in Glencoe in 1947; it was sold and moved to New York City in 1960.

=== Filming location ===
- Scenes from the films Ferris Bueller's Day Off and Sixteen Candles were filmed in Glencoe.
- The Glencoe train station is featured in scenes from Flags of Our Fathers and She's Having a Baby.
- The 2011 film Contagion has scenes filmed in Glencoe.

== Transportation ==
The Glencoe station provides Metra commuter rail service along the Union Pacific North Line. Trains travel south to Ogilvie Transportation Center in Chicago, and north to Kenosha station. Pace provides bus service on Route 213 connecting Glencoe to destinations across the North Shore.

== Notable people ==
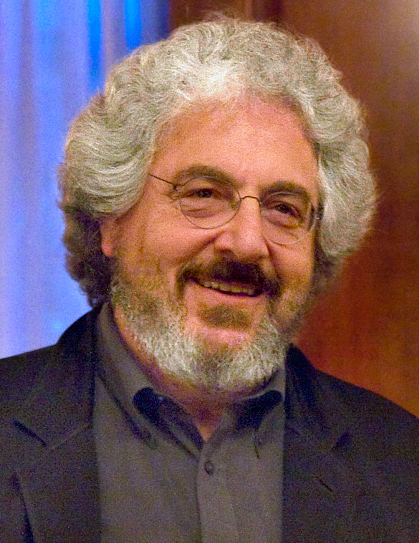
Harold Ramis

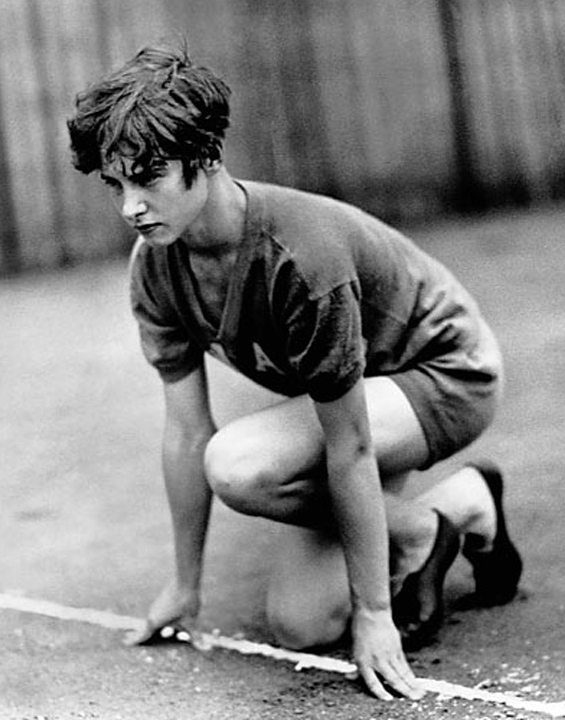
Betty Robinson

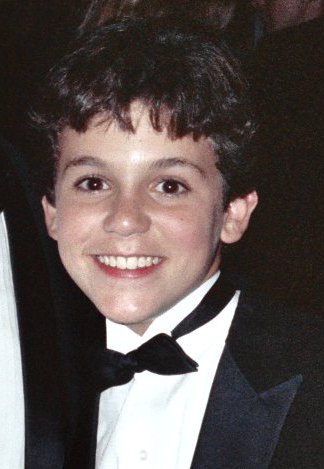
Fred Savage

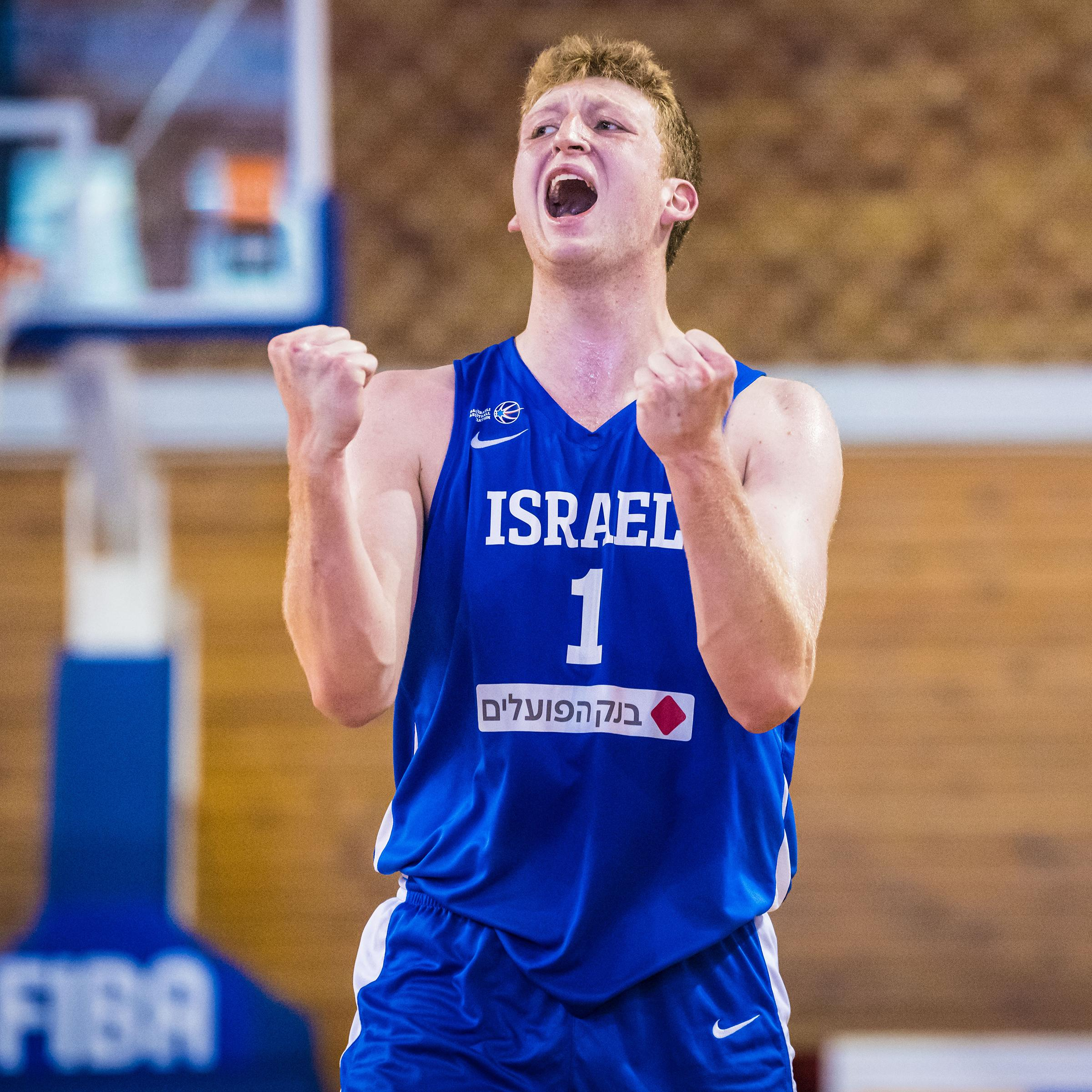
Danny Wolf

- Curt Anderson, Maryland legislator, grew up in Glencoe
- Michael Bloomfield, blues musician/guitarist/composer, lived in Glencoe
- Leo Burnett, advertising executive and founder of Leo Burnett Company
- Carl B. Camras, ophthalmologist known for his research on the treatment of glaucoma, born in Glencoe
- Marshall Chess, record producer, lived in Glencoe
- Ann Compton, former news reporter and White House correspondent for ABC News Radio; grew up in Glencoe
- Douglas Conant, CEO of the Campbell's; grew up in Glencoe
- Bruce Dern, actor
- Nick Foles, quarterback for the Chicago Bears; resided in Glencoe from 2020 to 2022
- Paris Grey, singer ("Big Fun (song)"); ("Good Life (Inner City song)"); (Inner City)
- Brian Griese, quarterback for the Chicago Bears; lived in Glencoe briefly
- Granville D. Hall, early and longtime village clerk, journalist, former president of the Louisville and Nashville Railroad and first Secretary of State of West Virginia
- Rick Hahn, Chicago White Sox general manager, lives in Glencoe
- Charles Henry Howard, Brevet Brigadier General for the Union Army during the American Civil War; head of the school board at Central School, and the first president of the New Trier High School school board; President of the Village of Glencoe from 1891 to 1892
- Walter Jacobson, former Chicago television news personality and a current Chicago radio news personality; grew up in Glencoe
- Frank King, cartoonist (Gasoline Alley); lived in Glencoe
- Eric Lefkofsky, billionaire entrepreneur, private equity investor, and venture capitalist; co-founder of Groupon; resides in Glencoe
- Zoe Levin, actress and star of Bonding, moved to Glencoe when she was 11
- John Lippman, television executive and the acting director of Voice of America
- Khalil Mack, linebacker for the Chicago Bears; resided in Glencoe from 2018 to 2021
- Archibald MacLeish, poet; three-time Pulitzer Prize winner; Librarian of Congress (1939–44); born in Glencoe
- Newton N. Minow, former Chair of the Federal Communications Commission
- Harold Ramis, comedian, actor, and director (Ghostbusters, Groundhog Day, Caddyshack)
- Betty Robinson, Olympic gold medalist sprinter; former fastest woman in the world; lived in Glencoe
- Ben Savage, actor (Boy Meets World); lived in Glencoe as a child
- Fred Savage, actor and director (The Wonder Years, The Princess Bride); lived in Glencoe as a child
- Robert Shea, co-author of the Illuminatus! trilogy.
- James Simpson Jr., Member of the U.S. House of Representatives
- Gene Siskel, film critic and journalist for the Chicago Tribune
- Ellen Spertus, former research scientist at Google, grew up in Glencoe
- Melville Elijah Stone, newspaper publisher, founder of the Chicago Daily News, general manager of the Associated Press
- Kenneth S. Suslick, leading expert on the chemical and physical effects of ultrasound; grew up in Glencoe
- Lili Taylor, actress (Mystic Pizza, I Shot Andy Warhol, Six Feet Under); born in Glencoe
- Paul Thomas (director) (aka Phil Toubus), actor, director
- Mike Tomczak, quarterback for the Chicago Bears; lived in Glencoe
- Scott Turow, bestselling author; lived in Glencoe
- Peter Van de Graaff, singer and radio personality; grew up in Glencoe
- James Wilkerson, Senior Judge of the U.S. District Court for the Northern District of Illinois
- Danny Wolf, American-Israeli NBA player for the Brooklyn Nets; grew up in Glencoe

== In popular culture ==
- Glencoe in the 1970s and 1980s is recalled as the backdrop of the coming-of-age memoir Lake Effect, by author Rich Cohen. This introduced his "Jamie Drew" character, based on exploits of his fellow native Mark Varouxakis.
- The plot of the film Mean Girls is set in Evanston on Chicago's North Shore. It refers to Glencoe in the quote "You go Glen-Coco".
- Glencoe was the stated setting for the 1983 film Risky Business, starring Tom Cruise. The movie was filmed in neighboring Highland Park.
