= Ravinia station =

Commuter rail station in Highland Park, Illinois

Ravinia

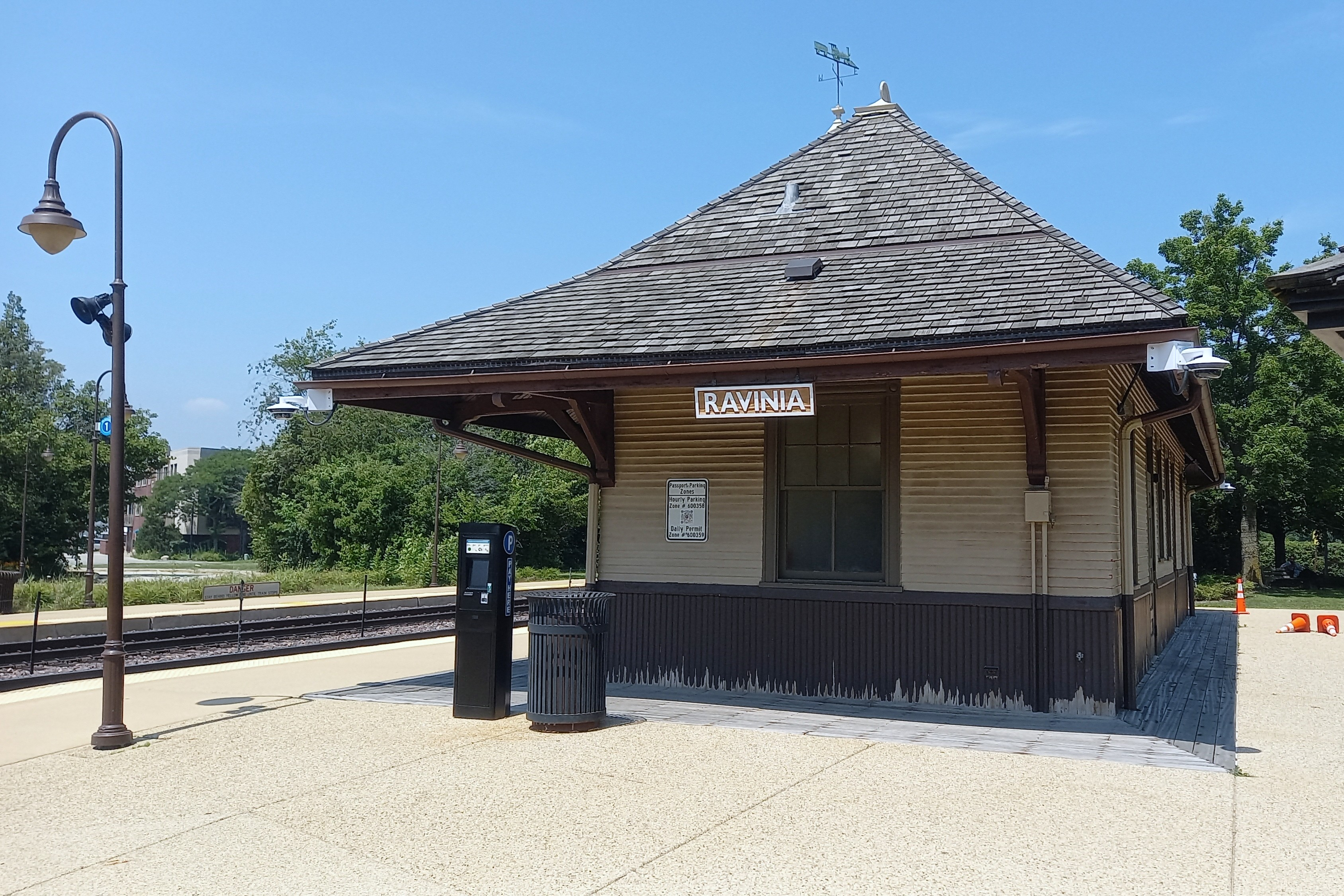
- Ravinia station in July 2025.

General information
- Location: 510 Roger Williams Avenue; Highland Park, Illinois 60035
- Coordinates: 42.1651°N 87.7828°W
- Owner: Union Pacific
- Platforms: 2 side platforms
- Tracks: 2
- Connections: Pace Buses; Green Bay Bike Trail

Construction
- Accessible: Yes

Other information
- Fare zone: 3

History
- Opened: 1889

Passengers
- 2018: 326 (average weekday) ▲10.5%
- Rank: 139 out of 236

Services
Preceding station	Metra	Following station
Highland Park toward Kenosha	Union Pacific North	Ravinia Park (seasonal) toward Ogilvie TC
Former services
Preceding station	Chicago and North Western Railway	Following station
Highland Park toward Milwaukee	Milwaukee Division	Braeside toward Chicago
Track layout
Location

Ravinia is a station on Metra's Union Pacific North Line. The station is located at 510 Roger Williams Avenue in Highland Park, Illinois. In Metra's zone-based fare structure, Ravinia is located in zone 3. As of 2018, Ravinia is the 139th busiest of Metra's 236 non-downtown stations, with an average of 326 weekday boardings. Ravinia is 21.5 miles (34.6 km) away from Ogilvie Transportation Center in downtown Chicago, the inbound terminus of the line. Trains continue as far north as Kenosha, Wisconsin.

As of September 20, 2025, Ravinia is served by 50 trains (26 inbound, 24 outbound) on weekdays, and by all 30 trains (15 in each direction) on weekends and holidays.

== Overview ==
The Ravinia station was opened in 1889 and includes a station house on the inbound platform which was designed by architect J.E. Blunt. Exterior work on the building, including the construction of a new roof and repainting, was completed in 2016.

The station consists of two grade-level side platforms which serve the inbound and outbound tracks. Since the Union Pacific North Line operates on a left-hand main, the inbound platform is on the east side and the outbound is on the west. The station house is open from 5:00 A.M. to 1:00 A.M. There is no ticket agent at Ravinia, so tickets must be purchased on board the train. Parking lots are located on both the east and west sides of the station; on Ravinia Festival concert dates, a bus is available between the lot and Ravinia Park. The Green Bay Trail runs parallel to the Union Pacific North Line at Ravinia and is accessible from the station.
