= Hubbard Woods station =

Commuter rail station in Winnetka, Illinois

Hubbard Woods

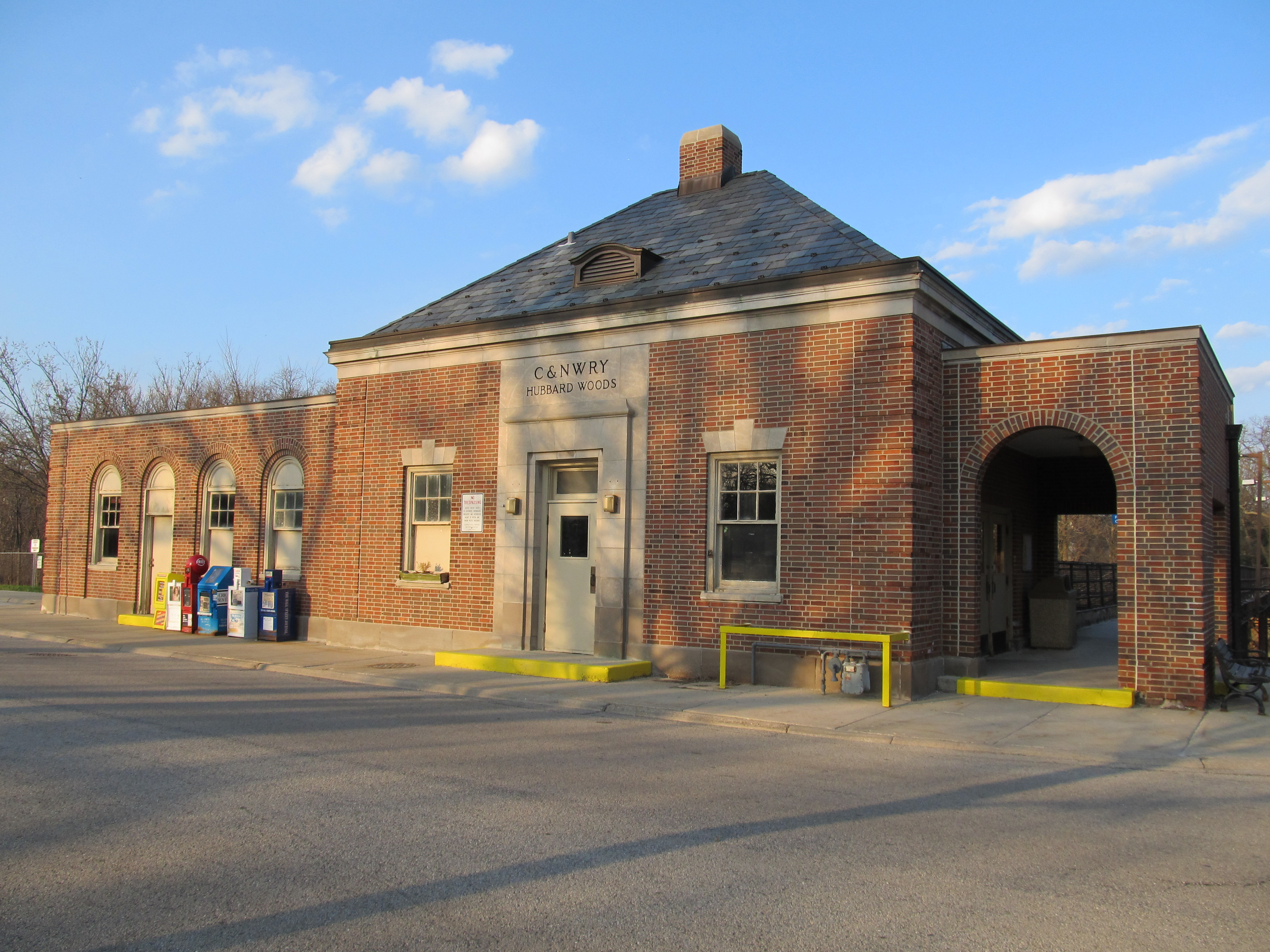
- The front entrance of Hubbard Woods station

General information
- Location: 1065 Gage Street; Winnetka, Illinois 60093
- Coordinates: 42.1181°N 87.7438°W
- Owner: Union Pacific Railroad
- Platforms: 2 side platforms
- Tracks: 2
- Connections: Pace Bus; Green Bay Trail

Construction
- Structure type: Open cut
- Accessible: No

Other information
- Fare zone: 3

History
- Opened: 1943

Passengers
- 2018: 396 (average weekday) ▲5.9%
- Rank: 120 out of 236

Services
Preceding station	Metra	Following station
Glencoe toward Kenosha	Union Pacific North	Winnetka toward Ogilvie TC
Former services
Preceding station	Chicago and North Western Railway	Following station
Glencoe toward Milwaukee	Milwaukee Division	Winnetka toward Chicago
Track layout
Location

Hubbard Woods is a station on Metra's Union Pacific North Line located in Winnetka, Illinois. Hubbard Woods is located at 1065 Gage Street in the Hubbard Woods community. Hubbard Woods is 17.7 miles (28.5 km) away from Ogilvie Transportation Center in Chicago, the southern terminus of the Union Pacific North Line. Trains continue as far north as Kenosha, Wisconsin. In Metra's zone-based fare system, Hubbard Woods is in Zone 3. As of 2018, Hubbard Woods is the 120th busiest of Metra's 236 non-downtown stations, with an average of 396 weekday boardings.

Hubbard Woods consists of a station and two side platforms which serve two tracks, with northbound trains using the west platform and southbound trains use the east platform. The station is located at street level and is open from 5:15 A.M. to 1:00 P.M. The platforms at Hubbard Woods are located in a below-grade depression. The platforms are accessible from Scott Avenue as well as a pedestrian bridge adjacent to the station house. Parking is available at Hubbard Woods.

As of September 20, 2025, Hubbard Woods is served by 50 trains (26 inbound, 24 outbound) on weekdays, and by all 30 trains (15 in each direction) on weekends and holidays.

The Green Bay Trail, a hiking and bicycle trail, runs parallel to the train tracks at Hubbard Woods and is accessible from the platforms. Until November 2015, this station had a ticket agent.

== History ==
Hubbard Woods and the other two Metra stations in Winnetka were built by the former Chicago and North Western Railway. These stations were originally built at grade level like all other Union Pacific/North Line stations north of Evanston Central Street. However, the grade crossings were not very safe, and accidents at railroad crossings resulted in twenty-nine deaths between 1912 and 1937. After two prominent Winnetka women were killed by a train at the Pine Street crossing in October 1937, the community of Winnetka demanded that something be done about the railroad crossings. It was decided that the railroad tracks would be lowered into a below-grade trench to eliminate street crossings. The project which lowered the tracks was partly funded by the Public Works Administration and was completed in 1943 after five years of work. Hubbard Woods and Winnetka stations are located in the trench, and Indian Hill is an elevated station just south of the trench. The tracks of the electric Chicago North Shore and Milwaukee Railroad, The "North Shore Line", (which were since abandoned and whose right-of-way is now part of the Green Bay Trail recreational path) were also relocated at this time and tracks were shared for periods during construction.

== Bus connections ==
Pace

- "Route 213 – Green Bay Road". PaceBus.com. Chicago: Pace Suburban Bus Service.
