= Indian Hill station =

Commuter rail station in Winnetka, Illinois

Indian Hill

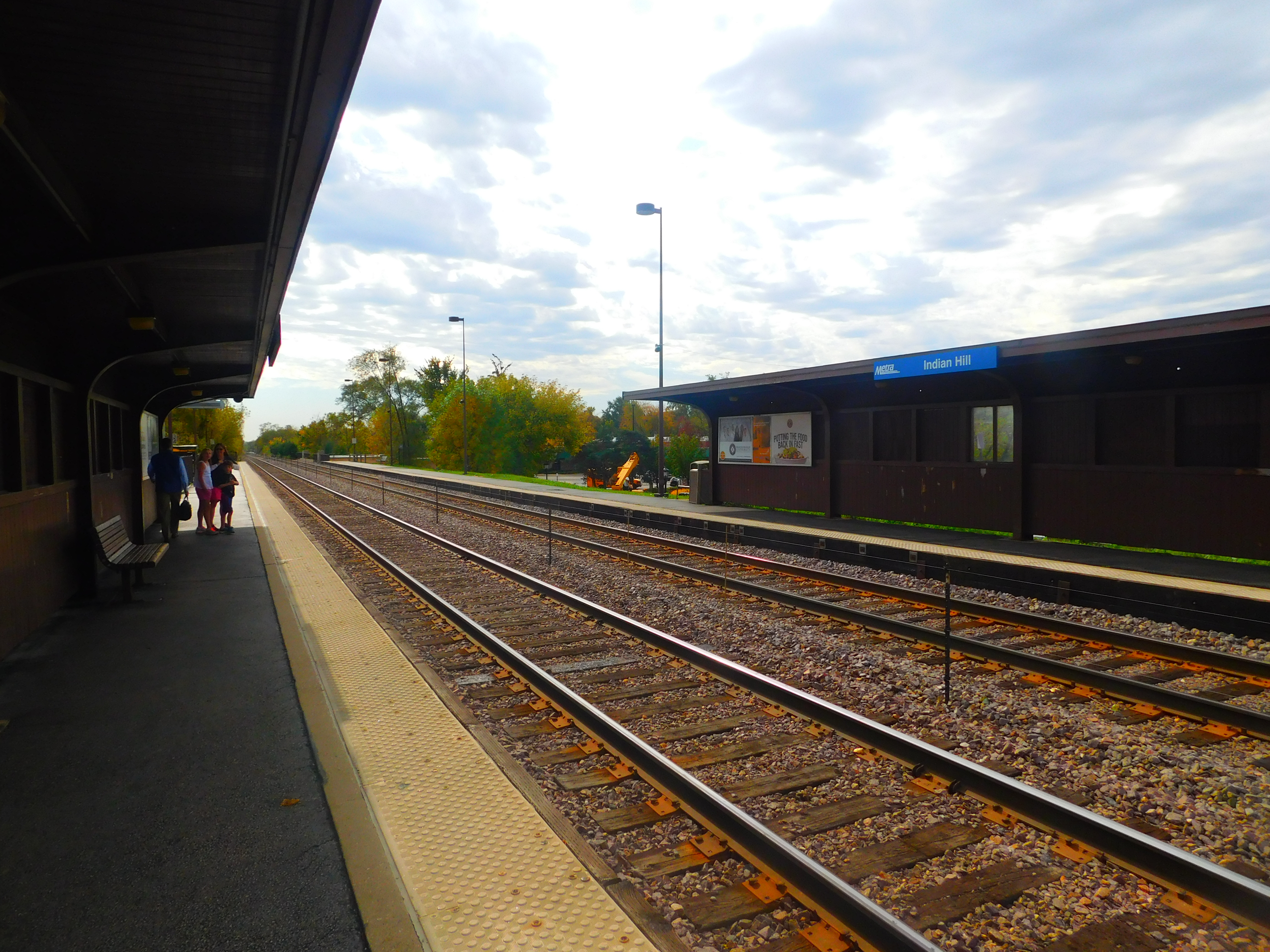

General information
- Location: 111 North Green Bay Road; Indian Hill, Illinois 60093
- Coordinates: 42.0945°N 87.7240°W
- Owner: Metra
- Platforms: 2 side platforms
- Tracks: 2
- Connections: Pace Buses; Green Bay Bike Trail

Construction
- Structure type: Elevated
- Accessible: No

Other information
- Fare zone: 3

History
- Rebuilt: 1943

Passengers
- 2018: 387 (average weekday) ▲1.3%
- Rank: 125 out of 236

Services
Preceding station	Metra	Following station
Winnetka toward Kenosha	Union Pacific North	Kenilworth toward Ogilvie TC
Former services
Preceding station	Chicago and North Western Railway	Following station
Winnetka toward Milwaukee	Milwaukee Division	Kenilworth toward Chicago
Track layout
Location

Indian Hill is a railroad station in the southernmost portion of Winnetka, Illinois, an affluent suburb north of Chicago. One of three stations serving that village, the Indian Hill stop is served by Metra's Union Pacific North Line trains, with service to Ogilvie Transportation Center in downtown Chicago. Northbound trains go as far as Kenosha, Wisconsin. In Metra's zone-based fare schedule, Indian Hill is in zone 3. As of 2018, Indian Hill is the 125th busiest of Metra's 236 non-downtown stations, with an average of 387 weekday boardings.

The station is located on Winnetka's southern border, at Green Bay Road and Winnetka Avenue, less than a mile west of Lake Michigan. Outbound trains stop on the west platform, and inbound trains stop on the east platform. Indian Hill lacks a ticket agent office; boarding passengers must buy their tickets on the train. Travel time to Ogilvie ranges from 31 to 39 minutes, depending on the train.

As of September 20, 2025, Indian Hill is served by 56 trains (28 in each direction) on weekdays, and by all 30 trains (15 in each direction) on weekends and holidays. During the summer concert season, an extra weekend train to Ravinia Park station also stops here.

Indian Hill is at the southern end of what is known as "The Big Ditch", which carries the railroad under Winnetka. Before the early 1940s, Winnetka had grade crossings, where accidents caused 31 deaths between 1912 and 1937. The village, federal government, and railroad authorities funded a five-year project to rebuild the railroad below grade, and this was completed in 1943, after which there were no more level crossings in Winnetka.

== Bus connections ==
Pace

- 213 Green Bay Road (Monday-Saturday only)
