= Braeside station =

Commuter rail station in Highland Park, Illinois

Braeside

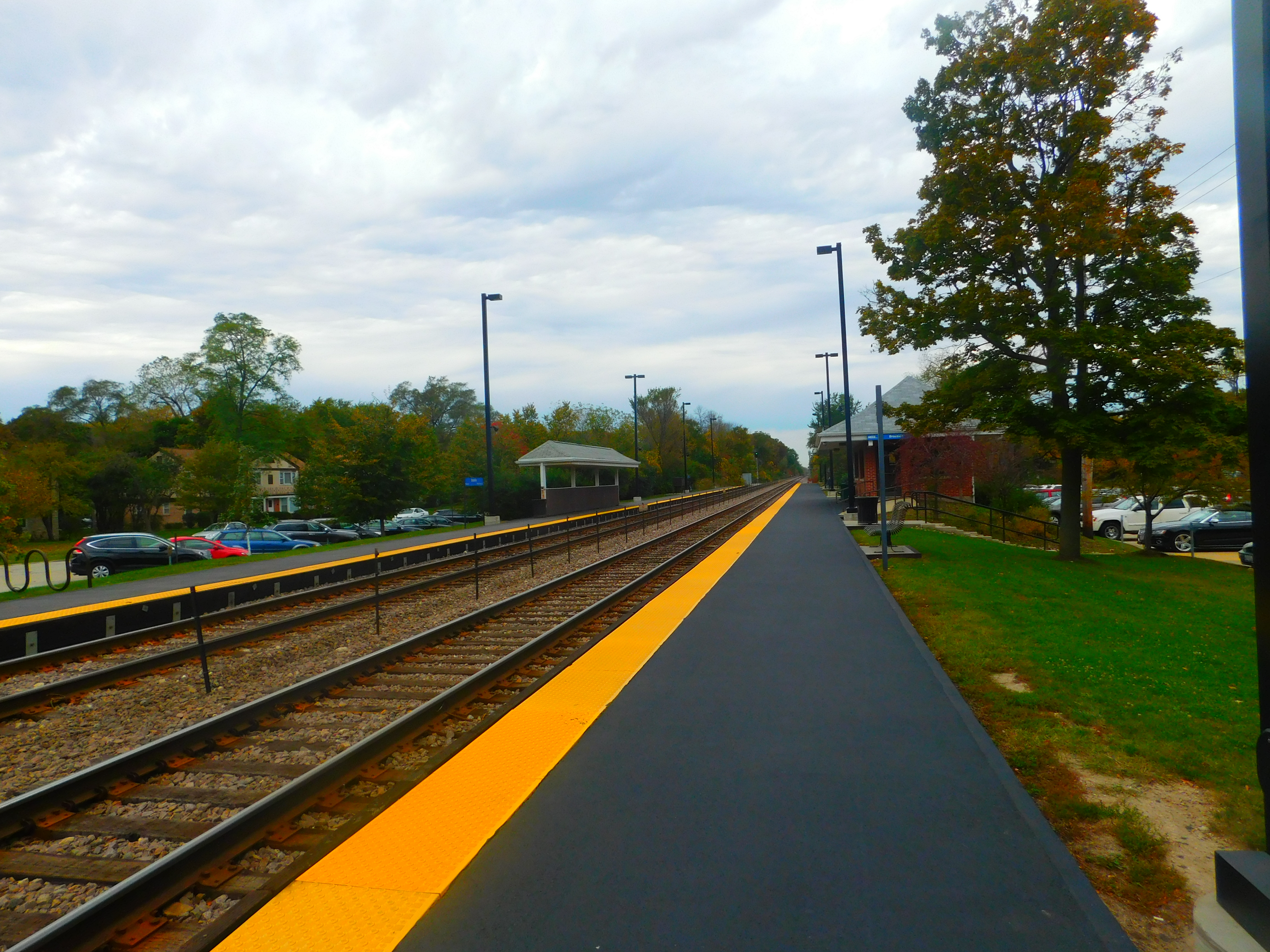
- Braeside station in October 2015

General information
- Location: 10 North Saint Johns Avenue; Highland Park, Illinois 60035
- Coordinates: 42.1528°N 87.7726°W
- Owner: Metra
- Platforms: 2 side platforms
- Tracks: 2
- Connections: Pace Buses; Green Bay Bike Trail

Construction
- Accessible: Yes, partial (Note: At partially accessible stations, customers using mobility devices can access and use trains; however, the stations may not have other accessibility features such as accessible bathrooms, Braille signage, visual display announcements, etc.)

Other information
- Fare zone: 3

Passengers
- 2018: 410 (average weekday) ▼7.2%
- Rank: 117 out of 236

Services
Preceding station	Metra	Following station
Ravinia Park (seasonal) toward Kenosha	Union Pacific North	Glencoe toward Ogilvie TC
Former services
Preceding station	Chicago and North Western Railway	Following station
Ravinia toward Milwaukee	Milwaukee Division	Glencoe toward Chicago
Track layout
Location

Braeside is a railroad station in Highland Park, Illinois serving Metra's Union Pacific North Line, in the Braeside neighborhood of Highland Park. It is located at 10 North St. Johns Avenue, just off Lake Cook Road. In Metra's zone-based fare schedule, Braeside is located in Zone 3. As of 2018, Braeside is the 117th busiest of Metra's 236 non-downtown stations, with an average of 410 weekday boardings. Cook County Forest Preserves' Turnbull Woods and William N. Erickson Preserve are adjacent to the station, and the Chicago Botanic Garden is a mile away. Braeside Station has a warming hut on the inbound side of the track. The station is named after the nearby Braeside Elementary School, part of North Shore School District 112. The station consists of two platforms and a waiting room/warming hut, but does not contain a ticket agent booth or restroom facilities. Northbound trains stop on the west platform and southbound trains stop on the east platform. Trains go south to Chicago's Ogilvie Transportation Center, and as far north as Kenosha, Wisconsin.

As of September 20, 2025, Braeside is served by 50 trains (26 inbound, 24 outbound) on weekdays, and by all 30 trains (15 in each direction) on weekends and holidays.
