= Winnetka station =

Commuter rail station in Winnetka, Illinois

Winnetka

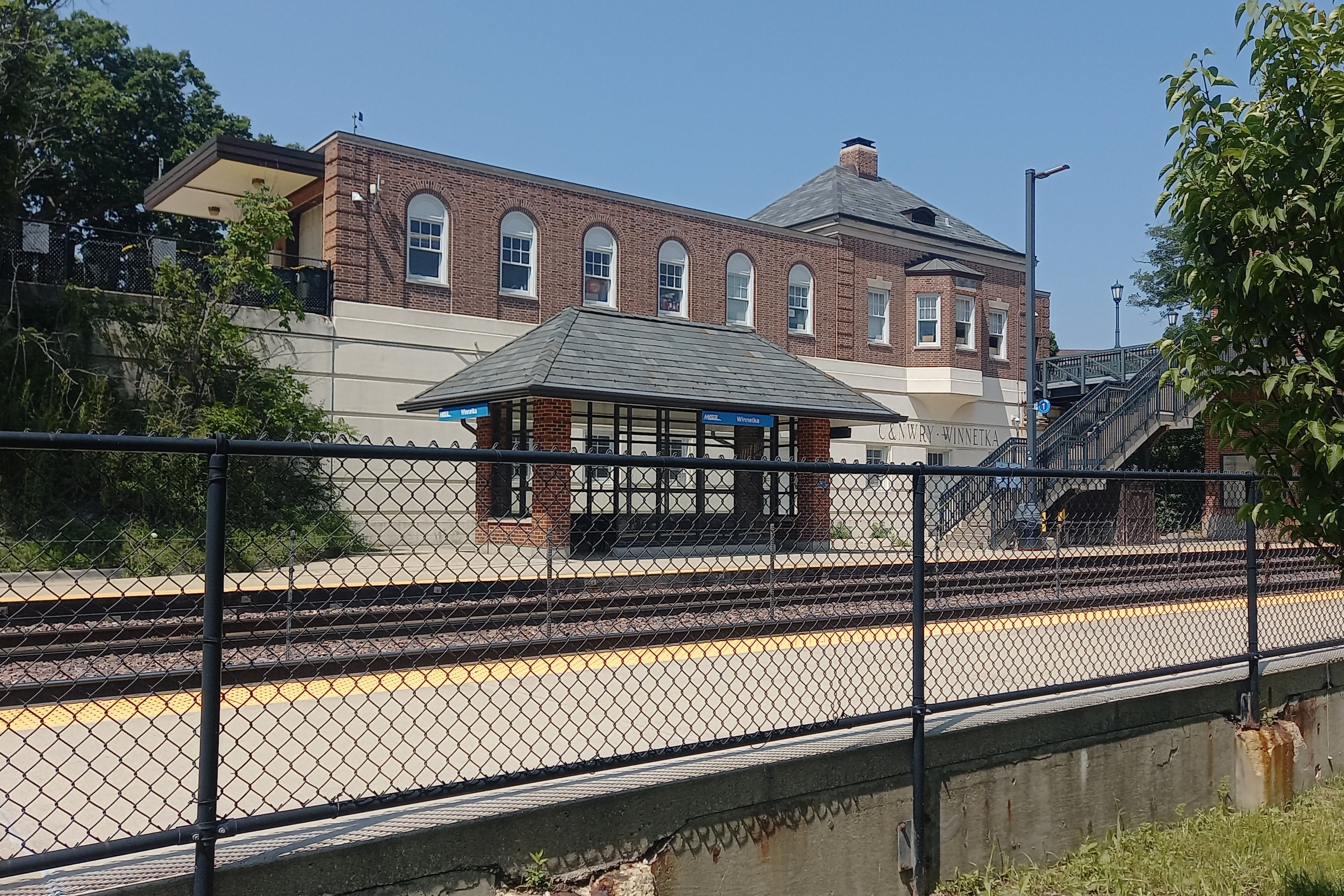
- Winnetka Metra station

General information
- Location: 754 Elm Street; Winnetka, Illinois 60093
- Coordinates: 42.1052°N 87.7329°W
- Owner: Village of Winnetka
- Platforms: 2 side platforms
- Tracks: 2
- Connections: Pace Buses; Green Bay Bike Trail

Construction
- Structure type: Open cut
- Accessible: Yes

Other information
- Fare zone: 3

History
- Rebuilt: 1940

Passengers
- 2018: 754 (average weekday) ▲2.3%
- Rank: 68 out of 236

Services
Preceding station	Metra	Following station
Hubbard Woods toward Kenosha	Union Pacific North	Indian Hill toward Ogilvie TC
Former services
Preceding station	Chicago and North Western Railway	Following station
Highland Park toward Minneapolis	Chicago – Minneapolis via Milwaukee	Evanston toward Chicago
Hubbard Woods toward Milwaukee	Milwaukee Division	Indian Hill toward Chicago
Track layout
Location

Winnetka is a station on Metra's Union Pacific North Line in Winnetka, Illinois. Winnetka station, located at 754 Elm Street in Winnetka, is 16.6 miles (26.7 km) away from Ogilvie Transportation Center, the inbound terminus of the Union Pacific North Line. In Metra's zone-based fare structure, Winnetka is in zone 3. As of 2018, Winnetka is the 68th busiest of Metra's 236 non-downtown stations, with an average of 754 weekday boardings.

Winnetka station is located in a below-grade trench. The platforms are accessible via stairs from Elm and Oak Streets and a passenger bridge. An elevator for accessibility is also located on the passenger bridge. The station consists of two side platforms which serve two tracks. A station house is located at street level; the station house is open from 5:15 A.M. to 1:15 P.M., and tickets are sold on weekdays. Parking is available in a lot adjacent to the station house. The Green Bay Trail, a hiking and bicycle trail, runs east of and parallel to the railroad tracks at Winnetka and can be accessed from the inbound platform.

As of September 20, 2025, Winnetka is served by all 71 trains (35 inbound and 36 outbound) on weekdays, and by all 30 trains (15 in each direction) on weekends and holidays. On weekdays, four outbound trains terminate at Winnetka, and two inbound trains originate from this station. During the summer concert season, an extra weekend train to Ravinia Park station also stops here.

Winnetka was built at grade level when it served the Chicago and North Western Railway. As an increasing amount of railroad traffic came through Winnetka, the railroad crossings became unsafe, and 29 people had been killed at railroad crossings by 1937 despite safety efforts by the city and the railroad. After two prominent Winnetka women died at the Pine Street crossing on October 20, 1937, Winnetkans demanded that the grade crossings be removed, electing to put the tracks in a below-grade trench. With the help of funding from the Public Works Administration, the tracks were lowered into a trench by 1943. Winnetka and Hubbard Woods stations were located at street level with access to station platforms by stairs from a pedestrian walkway across the tracks, and Indian Hill became an elevated station.

== Bus connections ==
Pace

- 213 Green Bay Road (Monday-Saturday only)
- 423 Linden CTA/The Glen/Harlem CTA (Weekdays only)
