= Highland Park station (Illinois) =

Commuter rail station in Highland Park, Illinois

Highland Park

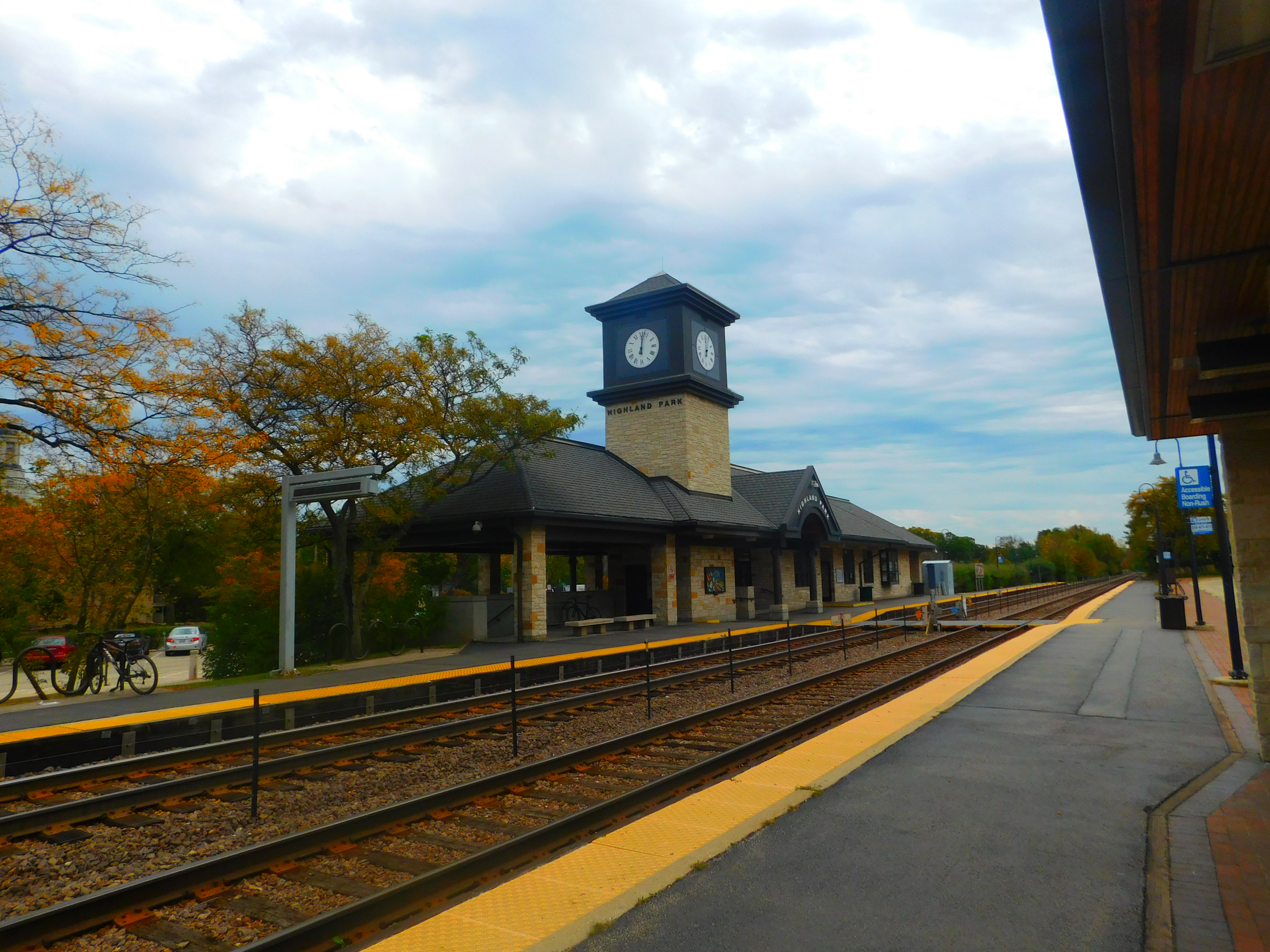
- Highland Park station in October 2015.

General information
- Location: 1800 St. Johns Avenue; Highland Park, Illinois 60035
- Coordinates: 42.1833°N 87.7974°W
- Owner: City of Highland Park
- Platforms: 2 Side platforms
- Tracks: 2
- Connections: Pace Buses; Green Bay Bike Trail

Construction
- Accessible: Yes

Other information
- Fare zone: 4

History
- Opened: 1963

Passengers
- 2018: 1,005 (average weekday) ▲2.8%
- Rank: 50 out of 236

Services
Preceding station	Metra	Following station
Highwood toward Kenosha	Union Pacific North	Ravinia toward Ogilvie TC
Former services
Preceding station	Chicago and North Western Railway	Following station
Lake Forest toward Minneapolis	Chicago – Minneapolis via Milwaukee	Winnetka toward Chicago
Highwood toward Milwaukee	Milwaukee Division	Ravinia toward Chicago
Track layout
Location

Highland Park is a railroad station in Highland Park, Illinois, serving Metra's Union Pacific North Line. It is located at 1800 St. Johns Avenue. In Metra's zone-based fare schedule, Highland Park is in Zone 4. As of 2018, Highland Park is the fiftieth busiest of Metra's 236 non-downtown stations, with an average of 1,005 weekday boardings.

The station consists of two side platforms and a waiting room, with a ticket agent booth staffed on weekday mornings. Northbound trains stop on the west platform and southbound trains stop on the east platform. Trains go south to Chicago's Ogilvie Transportation Center, and as far north as Kenosha, Wisconsin.

As of September 20, 2025, Highland Park is served by 65 trains (33 inbound, 32 outbound) on weekdays, and by all 30 trains (15 in each direction) on weekends and holidays.

On weekdays, seven outbound trains terminate, and seven inbound trains originate, at Highland Park.

== Bus connections ==
Pace

- 213 Green Bay Road (Monday-Saturday only)
- 471 Highland Park/Northbrook Court (Monday-Saturday only)
- 472 Highland Park/Highwood (Monday-Saturday only)
