= Winnetka, Illinois =

- Village
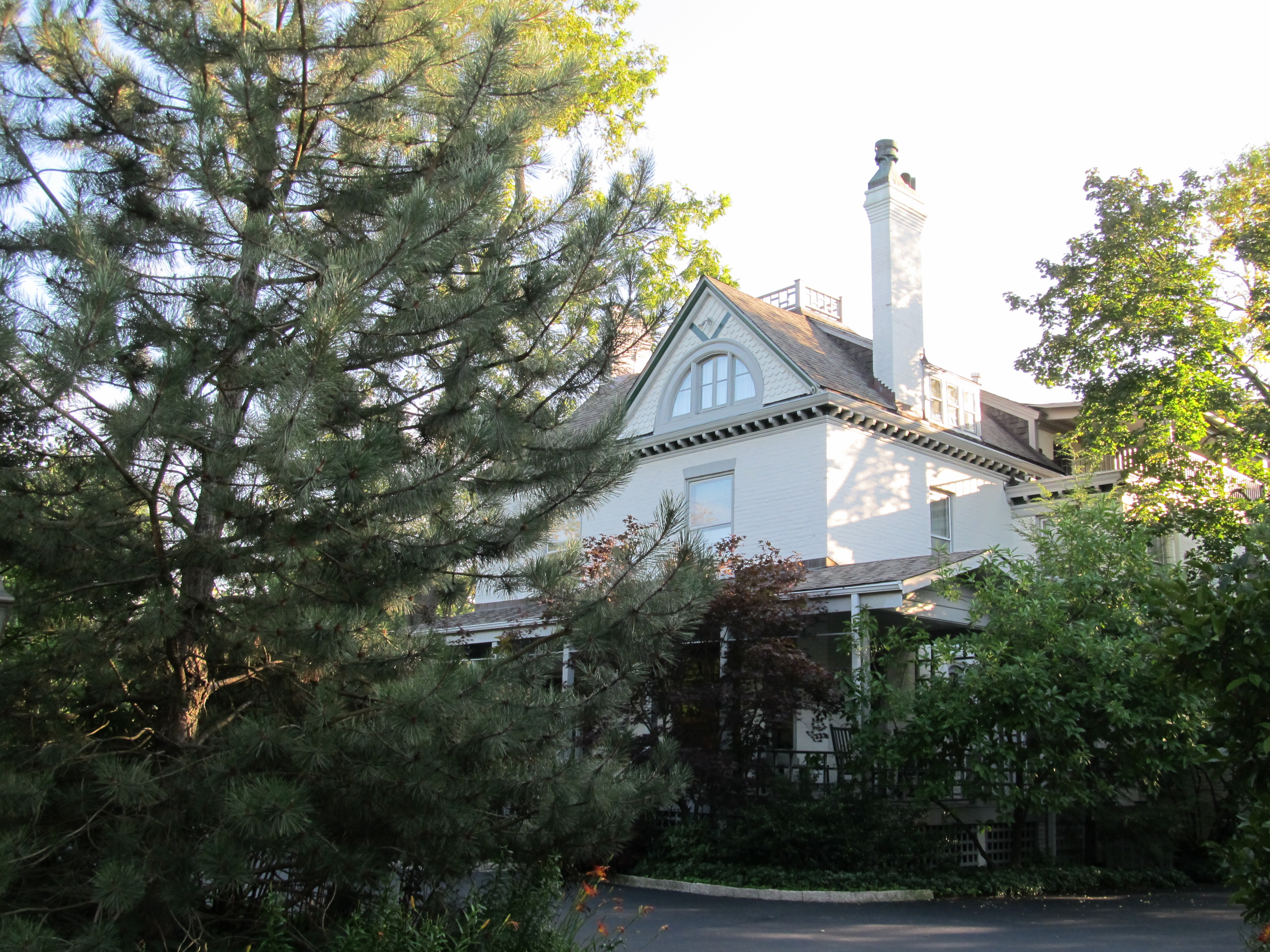
- The Wayside

- Flag Seal

- Location of Winnetka in Cook County, Illinois

- Location within Greater Chicago Location within Illinois Location within the United States
- Coordinates: 42°6′22″N 87°44′16″W
- Country: United States
- State: Illinois
- County: Cook
- Township: New Trier
- Incorporated: 1869

Government
  - Type: Council-manager
  - President: Bob Dearborn

Area
  - Total: 3.89 sq mi (10.08 km^{2})
  - Land: 3.81 sq mi (9.87 km^{2})
  - Water: 0.081 sq mi (0.21 km^{2}) 2.06%
- Elevation: 650 ft (200 m)

Population (2020)
  - Total: 12,475
  - Density: 3,343.6/sq mi (1,290.96/km^{2})
- Down 1.87% from 2000

Standard of living (2015–2019)
  - Per capita income: $123,319
  - Median value of owner-occupied housing units: $1,091,700
- Time zone: Central
- ZIP code: 60093
- Area code(s): 847, 224
- Geocode: 82530
- FIPS code: 17-82530
- Website: www.villageofwinnetka.org

Winnetka (/wɪˈnɛtkə/) is a village in Cook County, Illinois, United States, 17 miles (27 km) north of downtown Chicago. The population was 12,508 as of the 2026 census. The village is one of the wealthiest places in the United States in terms of household income. It was the second-ranked Illinois community on Bloomberg's 2019 Richest Places Annual Index. According to the U.S. Census Bureau, Winnetka's median household income exceeded $250,000 in 2023.

== History ==
The first houses were built in 1836. That year, Erastus Patterson and his family arrived from Vermont and opened a tavern to service passengers on the Green Bay Trail post road. The village was first subdivided in 1854 by Charles Peck and Walter S. Gurnee, President of the Chicago, Milwaukee & St. Paul Railroad. The railroads Peck and Gurnee created in 1854 allowed for prosperity and development along the North Shore. Close to 100 individuals inhabited New Trier Township in 1850 (which is named after Trier, Germany, the home of many settlers living in the North Shore). Winnetka's first private school was opened in 1856 by Mr. and Mrs. Charles Peck with seventeen pupils. In 1859, the first public school building was built with private funds at the southeast corner of Elm and Maple streets. The village was incorporated in 1869 with a population of 450. The name is believed to originate from the Potawatomi language, meaning 'beautiful place'.

The oldest surviving house in Winnetka is the Schmidt-Burnham Log House. Originally constructed on what is now the Indian Hill Club on the south edge of town and in 1917 moved to Tower Road, it was moved in 2003 from Tower Road to the Crow Island Woods.

Schmidt-Burnham Log House at its second location on Tower Road.

Winnetka's neighborhoods include estates and homes designed by distinguished architects including George Washington Maher, Walter Burley Griffin, John S. Van Bergen, Robert Seyfarth, Robert McNitt, Howard Van Doren Shaw and David Adler. Among Winnetka's celebrities are actor Rock Hudson and rock singer/songwriter/producer Richard Marx.

Churches in Winnetka were also designed by noted architects. Among them, the former First Church of Christ, Scientist, 440 Ridge Avenue, was designed in 1924 by architect Solon S. Beman.

In the 1920s, a colonial Georgian house was built at 671 Lincoln Avenue. The house is now known as the famous Home Alone house for its exterior being used as a shooting location for two films in the series, starting in 1990.

The Chicago and Milwaukee Railway was built in 1855 through Winnetka, connecting its namesake cities. It eventually became the Chicago & Northwestern Railway. Between 1937 and 1942 the railroad tracks through Winnetka were grade separated after several people were hit at grade crossings. In 1995 the C&NW was merged into the Union Pacific. Only Metra trains are operated on this track now; freight operations ended in the late 1980s. Winnetka has three Metra stations: Hubbard Woods, Winnetka, and Indian Hill.

The Chicago, North Shore and Milwaukee electric interurban was built through Winnetka and the North Shore in the first decade of the 1900s, and the line through Winnetka was removed in 1955. This is now the Green Bay Trail bicycle path.

In 1904, the Winnetka Park District was established, making it the fourth oldest park district in the state of Illinois. Today, the park district maintains and operates 27 parks, five beaches, and golf, tennis, ice skating/hockey, and paddle tennis facilities.

The Crow Island School, designed by Eliel & Eero Saarinen and the architectural firm Perkins, Wheeler & Will, was declared a National Historical Landmark in 1990. It was declared 12th among all buildings and the best architectural design of all schools. Ten thousand people attended the opening in 1938.

In 1965, Martin Luther King Jr. spoke in Winnetka. A plaque dedicated to him is on the Village Green (which was donated by the Pecks in 1869), a park in the town, where he spoke. As a result of Dr. King's open housing campaign and the North Shore Summer Project, the nonprofit now known as Open Communities was founded.

== Geography ==
According to the 2010 census, Winnetka has a total area of 3.893 square miles (10.08 km^{2}), of which 3.81 square miles (9.87 km^{2}) (or 97.87%) is land and 0.083 square miles (0.21 km^{2}) (or 2.13%) is water.

=== Northern boundary ===
Winnetka's northern border with Glencoe cuts through 58 homes, causing homeowners to have to pay taxes to, and seek permits from both villages. The two villages began discussing a solution during the 1920s, reaching a tentative agreement in 2007 in which each homeowner could choose a village from which to receive services while the boundary officially remained unchanged. Initially, 46 homeowners chose Winnetka, but the others had the option to choose a village later. The boundary was later updated to reflect these choices.

== Demographics ==
Historical population
| Census | Pop. | Note | %± |
|---|---|---|---|
| 1880 | 584 | | — |
| 1890 | 1,079 | | 84.8% |
| 1900 | 1,833 | | 69.9% |
| 1910 | 3,168 | | 72.8% |
| 1920 | 6,694 | | 111.3% |
| 1930 | 12,166 | | 81.7% |
| 1940 | 12,430 | | 2.2% |
| 1950 | 12,105 | | −2.6% |
| 1960 | 13,368 | | 10.4% |
| 1970 | 14,131 | | 5.7% |
| 1980 | 12,772 | | −9.6% |
| 1990 | 12,174 | | −4.7% |
| 2000 | 12,419 | | 2.0% |
| 2010 | 12,187 | | −1.9% |
| 2020 | 12,744 | | 4.6% |
U.S. Decennial Census

=== Racial and ethnic composition ===
Winnetka village, Illinois – Racial and ethnic composition Note: the US Census treats Hispanic/Latino as an ethnic category. This table excludes Latinos from the racial categories and assigns them to a separate category. Hispanics/Latinos may be of any race.
| Race / Ethnicity (NH = Non-Hispanic) | Pop 2000 | Pop 2010 | Pop 2020 | % 2000 | % 2010 | % 2020 |
|---|---|---|---|---|---|---|
| White alone (NH) | 11,848 | 11,334 | 11,257 | 95.40% | 93.00% | 88.33% |
| Black or African American alone (NH) | 31 | 31 | 29 | 0.25% | 0.25% | 0.23% |
| Native American or Alaska Native alone (NH) | 2 | 9 | 4 | 0.02% | 0.07% | 0.03% |
| Asian alone (NH) | 302 | 400 | 444 | 2.43% | 3.28% | 3.48% |
| Native Hawaiian or Pacific Islander alone (NH) | 0 | 3 | 3 | 0.00% | 0.02% | 0.02% |
| Other race alone (NH) | 8 | 14 | 47 | 0.06% | 0.11% | 0.37% |
| Mixed race or Multiracial (NH) | 72 | 125 | 449 | 0.58% | 1.03% | 3.52% |
| Hispanic or Latino (any race) | 156 | 271 | 511 | 1.26% | 2.22% | 4.01% |
| Total | 12,419 | 12,187 | 12,744 | 100.00% | 100.00% | 100.00% |

=== 2020 census ===
As of the 2020 census, Winnetka had a population of 12,744. There were 3,461 families residing in the village. The population density was 3,275.25 inhabitants per square mile (1,264.58/km^{2}), and the average housing unit density was 1,145.98 per square mile (442.47/km^{2}).

100.0% of residents lived in urban areas, while 0.0% lived in rural areas.

Of the 4,170 households, 45.1% had children under the age of 18 living in them. Of all households, 74.0% were married-couple households, 8.1% were households with a male householder and no spouse or partner present, and 16.6% were households with a female householder and no spouse or partner present. About 15.6% of all households were made up of individuals, and 9.0% had someone living alone who was 65 years of age or older.

The median age was 41.3 years. 30.8% of residents were under the age of 18, and 15.4% were 65 years of age or older. For every 100 females there were 96.0 males, and for every 100 females age 18 and over there were 93.1 males age 18 and over.

There were 4,459 housing units, of which 6.5% were vacant. The homeowner vacancy rate was 1.4%, and the rental vacancy rate was 6.7%.

=== Income and poverty ===
The median income for a household in the village was in excess of $250,000, as was the median income for a family. Males had a median income of $200,944 versus $66,726 for females. The per capita income for the village was $134,596. About 1.7% of families and 2.6% of the population were below the poverty line, including 1.8% of those under age 18 and 1.3% of those age 65 or over.

== Education ==
=== Public schools ===
For the history see Arthur Zilversmit, Changing schools: Progressive education theory and practice, 1930-1960 (University of Chicago Press, 1993). The Winnetka Public Schools system (District 36) consists of three elementary schools and two middle schools. Hubbard Woods (est. 1915), Crow Island (est. 1940), and Samuel Sewall Greeley (est. 1912) Elementary Schools serve grades kindergarten through four, students in fifth and sixth grades attend the Skokie School (opened 1922) and seventh and eighth graders attend the Carleton W. Washburne School (est. 1969), named after educator Carleton Washburne. Winnetka's schools were modeled after Washburne's educational philosophy in an experiment called the Winnetka Plan, which focused on giving students creative activities and social development. The town's schools continue to reflect his educational philosophy. Crow Island is a National Historic Landmark due to its significant architectural design.

Some neighborhoods in the southern part of Winnetka are served by Avoca School District 37, which has schools in Glenview (Avoca West Elementary School; K-5) and Wilmette (Marie Murphy School; grades 6-8). Kenilworth School District 38 (Sears School; K-8) also includes a very small portion of the southeastern part of Winnetka, near Kenilworth.

Winnetka is in New Trier Township, and public school students who reside in Winnetka attend New Trier High School for grades 9 through 12.

=== Private schools ===
- Hadley Institute for the Blind and Visually Impaired, est. 1920
- La Petite École de Chicago, Winnetka Campus (Preschool–9), bilingual school, est. 2020
- North Shore Country Day School (JK–12), est. 1919
- Sacred Heart School (Preschool–8), Catholic school, est. 1902
- The School of Saints Faith, Hope & Charity (Preschool–8), Catholic school, est. 1939

== Media ==
Media outlets covering Winnetka include the Winnetka-Glencoe Patch, the Chicago Tribune's TribLocal, the Pioneer Press, Winnetka Talk, and The Winnetka Current.

== Infrastructure ==
=== Transportation ===
Metra serves three stations in Winnetka. All provide commuter rail service along the Union Pacific North Line. Trains travel south to Ogilvie Transportation Center in Chicago, and north to Kenosha station. In the downtown area is The Winnetka station. Indian Hill is on the south end of the village and Hubbard Woods is at the north end.

Besides Metra, Pace Suburban Bus serves the Chicago Metropolitan Area. Winnetka has Pace Route 213 on Green Bay Road originating from Chicago Howard CTA Station, branching to Northbrook Court Mall, and the Highland Park, Illinois Metra Station. Pace also has route 423 from CTA's Linden Station in Wilmette branching to The Glen Town Center in Glenview, Illinois, then ending at Chicago's CTA Harlem Station. Pace route 423 enters Winnetka from Northfield on Willow Road, turning on to Hibbard Road, Elm Street, then Green Bay Road to Linden Station.

== Notable people ==
- Ivan Albright, painter, sculptor and print-maker; attended New Trier High School
- Trish Andrew, basketball player, attended New Trier High School
- Ann-Margret, actress, attended New Trier High School
- Adam Baldwin, actor, attended New Trier High School
- Peter Baldwin, director
- Page Morton Black, singer, chairperson of Parkinson's Disease Foundation
- David Bradley, director, born in Winnetka
- Ann Hampton Callaway, singer, lived in Winnetka and attended New Trier High School
- Liz Callaway, singer, lived in Winnetka and attended New Trier High School
- Katie Chang, actress, lives in Winnetka and attended New Trier High School.
- Anne Clarke, American-born British Labour Party politician, London Assembly member for Barnet and Camden; grew up in Winnetka.
- Dale Clevenger, principal horn, Chicago Symphony Orchestra
- Chris Collins, basketball coach, lives in Winnetka
- Richard Dickson Cudahy, jurist, lived in Winnetka
- Jay Cutler, NFL quarterback, lived in Winnetka
- Bruce Dern, actor, attended New Trier High School
- Phil Donahue, talk show host, lived in Winnetka
- Conor Dwyer, Olympic swimmer, 2012 gold medalist
- Christine Ebersole, Tony Award-winning actress
- Neal Edelstein, film producer and director, raised in Winnetka
- Deborah Eisenberg, short-story writer, winner of MacArthur Fellowship
- Gil Elvgren, painter
- Mary Callahan Erdoes, CEO of JPMorgan Chase's Asset & Wealth Management division, raised in Winnetka
- Ray Garrett Jr., chairman of the U.S. Securities and Exchange Commission
- Katie Gavin, lead singer of Muna, graduated from New Trier High School
- Marion Mahony Griffin (1871–1961), first architect employed by Frank Lloyd Wright; helped design Canberra, capital of Australia, grew up in Winnetka
- Rick Hahn, general manager of Chicago White Sox
- Brett Harrison, CEO of Architect Financial Technologies Inc
- Carl L. Hamilton, named partner in the Booz Allen Hamilton management and information technology consulting firm
- Charlton Heston, actor, lived in Winnetka and attended New Trier High School
- Roger Hochschild, CEO and President of Discover Financial Services, lives in Winnetka
- Rock Hudson, actor; born and raised in Winnetka and attended New Trier High School
- Harold L. Ickes, former United States Secretary of the Interior, built home at 900 Private Road
- Matt Kaskey, offensive tackle for the Carolina Panthers
- Bruce Krasberg, industrialist and horticulturist, lived in Winnetka
- Kate Liu, pianist, lives in Winnetka and attended New Trier High School
- Georgia Lloyd (1913–1999), pacifist, writer
- Henry Demarest Lloyd, activist for labor rights, woman suffrage, and against corporate corruption
- Matt Lottich, basketball coach, Valparaiso
- Virginia Madsen, actress, attended New Trier High School
- Kim Milford, actor
- Penelope Milford, actress
- John Moore, defenseman playing in the NHL's Anaheim Ducks organization
- Chris O'Donnell, actor (G. Callen on NCIS: Los Angeles)
- Tom O'Halleran, member of the United States House of Representatives from Arizona's 1st congressional district. He lived in Winnetka while a member of the Chicago Board of Trade.
- Samuel Shackford Otis, architect
- Liz Phair, musician, grew up in Winnetka
- Ralph Pomeroy, poet and writer
- Eliot Porter, photographer, was born and grew up in Winnetka.
- Fairfield Porter, painter and art critic, was born and grew up in Winnetka.
- Janet Meakin Poor, landscape architect and plant conservationist
- Clarence B. Randall, businessman
- Bruce Rauner, former Governor of Illinois, former chairman of R8 Capital Partners
- Pat Ryan, founder and executive chairman of Aon Corporation
- Donald Rumsfeld, former Secretary of Defense, attended New Trier High School
- Jenny Sanford, former First Lady of South Carolina
- Jack Steinberger, refugee from Nazi Germany, attended New Trier High School, won 1988 Nobel Prize in Physics, gave Nobel medal to school
- W. Clement Stone, businessman and philanthropist
- Walter A. Strong, publisher of Chicago Daily News,
- R. Douglas Stuart Jr., CEO of Quaker Oats and U.S. ambassador to Norway, born in Winnetka
- Marlo Thomas, actress, lived in Winnetka
- Paul Thomas, pornographic actor and director
- Henry Totten, Wisconsin State Assemblyman and businessman, lived in Winnetka
- Marc Trestman, former head coach of Chicago Bears, lived in Winnetka
- Joe Trohman, guitarist of Fall Out Boy, attended New Trier High School
- Byron Trott, banker
- Barbara Turf, former president and CEO of Crate & Barrel
- Scott Turow, writer and lawyer
- Bernice T. Van der Vries, state legislator, lived in Winnetka
- William I. Westervelt, US Army brigadier general
- Rocky Wirtz, owner of the Chicago Blackhawks, attended North Shore Country Day School, lives in Winnetka
- Ying Quartet, originally consisting of four siblings from Winnetka; as of 2017, three siblings remain members of the ensemble

== In popular culture ==
"Big Noise from Winnetka", a 1938 jazz song by The Bobcats, has been featured in a number of Hollywood movies, including Let's Make Music and Reveille with Beverly.

Winnetka was mentioned in the novel Havana by Stephen Hunter. Secondary character Roger St. John Evans was mentioned as "The Big Noise From Winnetka".

=== Film ===
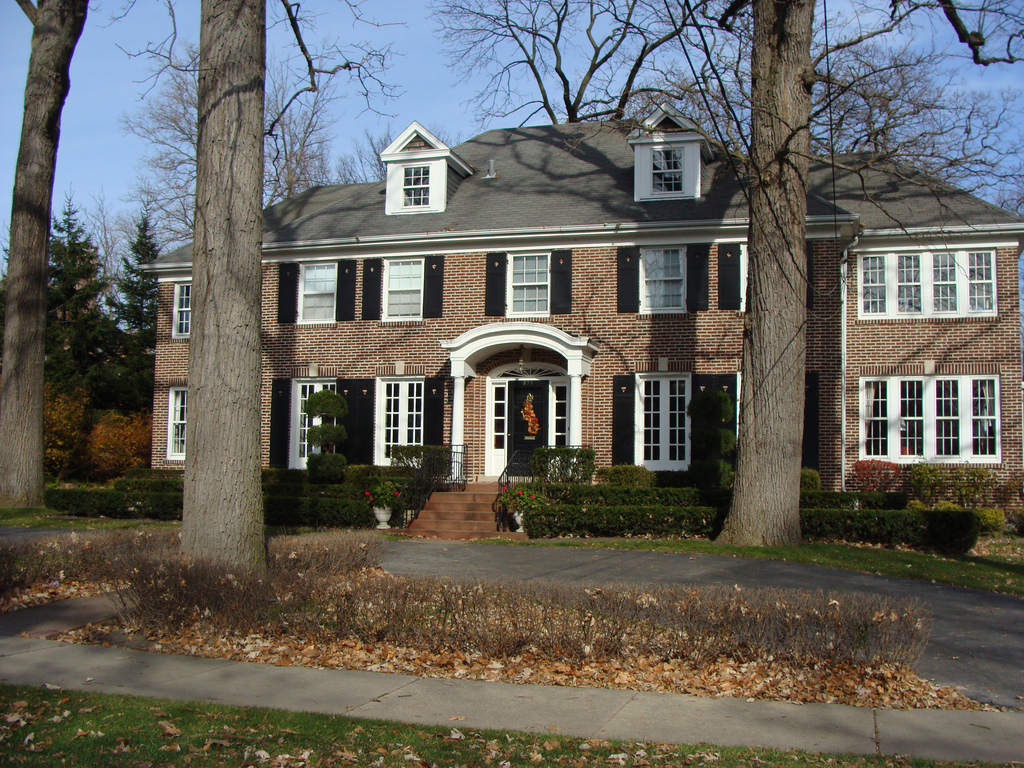
The house featured in the film Home Alone and in the beginning of its sequel Home Alone 2: Lost in New York

The first two and sixth films of the Home Alone series are set in Winnetka. The McCallister family in Home Alone and its sequel, Home Alone 2: Lost in New York, lives at 671 Lincoln Avenue. The address is mentioned in the film, but the street is referred to as "Lincoln Boulevard". Since the first film's 1990 release, the house is visited year-round, especially during Christmas time.

Numerous other films have been shot in Winnetka, including portions of Ocean's Twelve, The Breakfast Club, National Lampoon's Vacation, Ferris Bueller's Day Off, Sixteen Candles, Planes, Trains and Automobiles, She's Having a Baby, Uncle Buck, and Contagion, many of which, including the first two Home Alone films, were produced by John Hughes. Holidate and Home Sweet Home Alone are set in Winnetka.

=== Television ===
A popular TV series, Sisters (1991–1996), was set primarily in Winnetka, but was not filmed there, except for some exterior establishing shots. This was also true of its erstwhile summer replacement series, Winnetka Road.

The characters on the TV series The League reside in Winnetka.

The TV series I Didn't Do It is set in Winnetka. The characters attend the fictional Ditka High School.
