= Glencoe station =

Commuter rail station in Glencoe, Illinois

Glencoe

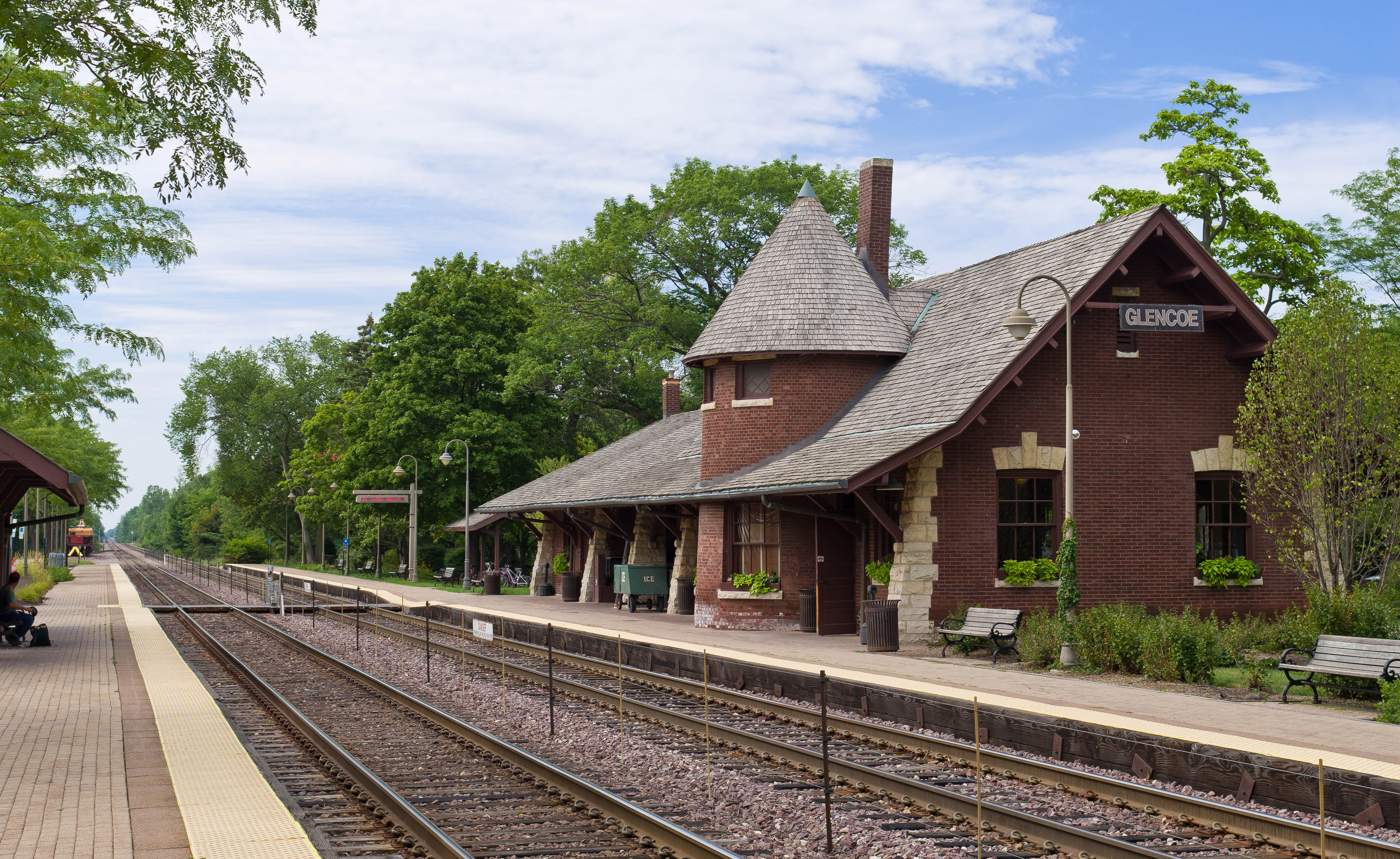
- Glencoe station in 2012

General information
- Location: 724 Green Bay Road; Glencoe, Illinois 60022
- Owner: Metra
- Platforms: 2 side platforms
- Tracks: 2
- Connections: Pace Bus; Chicago Botanical Garden Trolley; Green Bay Bike Trail

Construction
- Structure type: At grade
- Parking: Yes
- Accessible: Yes

Other information
- Fare zone: 3

History
- Opened: 1891

Passengers
- 2018: 732 (average weekday) ▲2.4%
- Rank: 72 out of 236

Services
Preceding station	Metra	Following station
Braeside toward Kenosha	Union Pacific North	Hubbard Woods toward Ogilvie TC
Former services
Preceding station	Chicago and North Western Railway	Following station
Braeside toward Milwaukee	Milwaukee Division	Hubbard Woods toward Chicago
Track layout
Location

Glencoe station is a historic commuter railroad station along Metra's Union Pacific North Line in Glencoe, Illinois. It is officially located on 724 Green Bay Road, however it also runs parallel to Old Green Bay Road, both of which intersect with Park Avenue. As of 2018, Glencoe is the 72nd busiest of Metra's 236 non-downtown stations, with an average of 732 weekday boardings.

As of September 20, 2025, Glencoe is served by 65 trains (33 inbound, 32 outbound) on weekdays, and by all 30 trains (15 in each direction) on weekends and holidays.

Like Braeside station, Glencoe is in close proximity to the Cook County Forest Preserves' Turnbull Woods, William N. Erickson Preserve, and the Chicago Botanic Garden. Unlike Braeside, Glencoe was built in a partial Romanesque-style for the Chicago and North Western Railway by architect Charles Sumner Frost in 1891. The Green Bay Bike Trail, and the local Veterans Memorial Park are also nearby.

Northbound trains go as far north as Kenosha, Wisconsin, and southbound trains go as far as Chicago's Ogilvie Transportation Center. The station was considered for listing on the National Register of Historic Places in 1991, but this was not done after the Chicago and North Western Railway, which owned the property, objected.

== Bus connections ==
Pace

- 213 Green Bay Road (Monday-Saturday only)

Other

- Chicago Botanical Garden Trolley
