= Green Bay Trail =

Multi-use trail in Illinois, United States

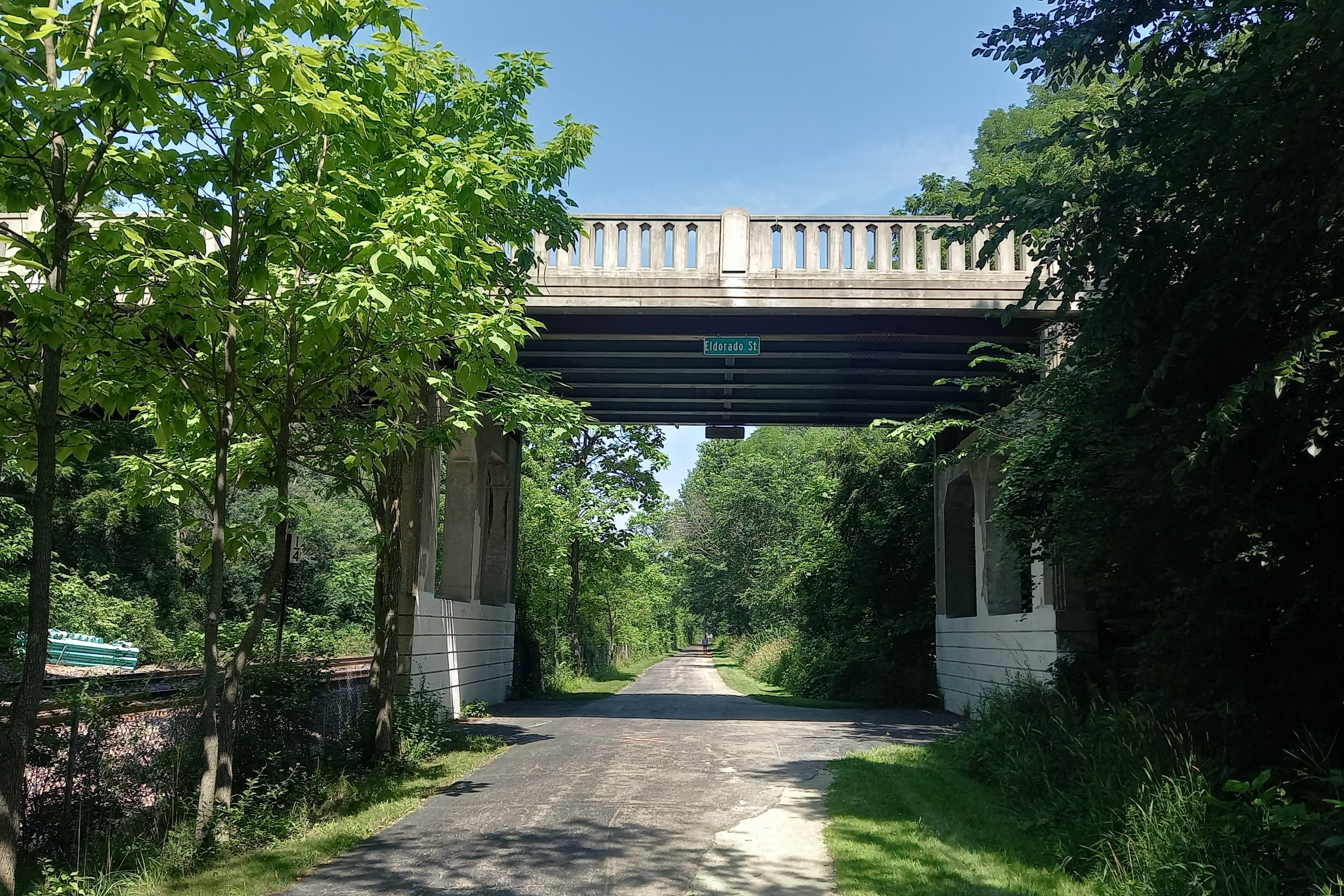
- Green Bay Trail at the Eldorado Street overpass in Winnetka
- Length: 8.9 mi (14.3 km)
- Location: Wilmette to Highland Park, Illinois
- Established: 1965; 61 years ago
- Trailheads: Wilmette, Kenilworth, Indian Hill, Winnetka, Hubbard Woods, Glencoe, Braeside, Ravinia, Highland Park
- Use: bicycling, inline skating, walking, cross country skiing
- Difficulty: easy, level, ADA accessible
- Surface: asphalt, crushed stone, concrete
- Maintained by: Friends of the Green Bay Trail

The Green Bay Trail is a rails with trails built on the former Chicago North Shore and Milwaukee Railroad. It runs parallel to Metra's Union Pacific North Line for nearly nine miles from Wilmette, Illinois, to Highland Park, Illinois. It was originally a path used by various users between the Chicago area and the Green Bay, Wisconsin, area.

== Early history ==
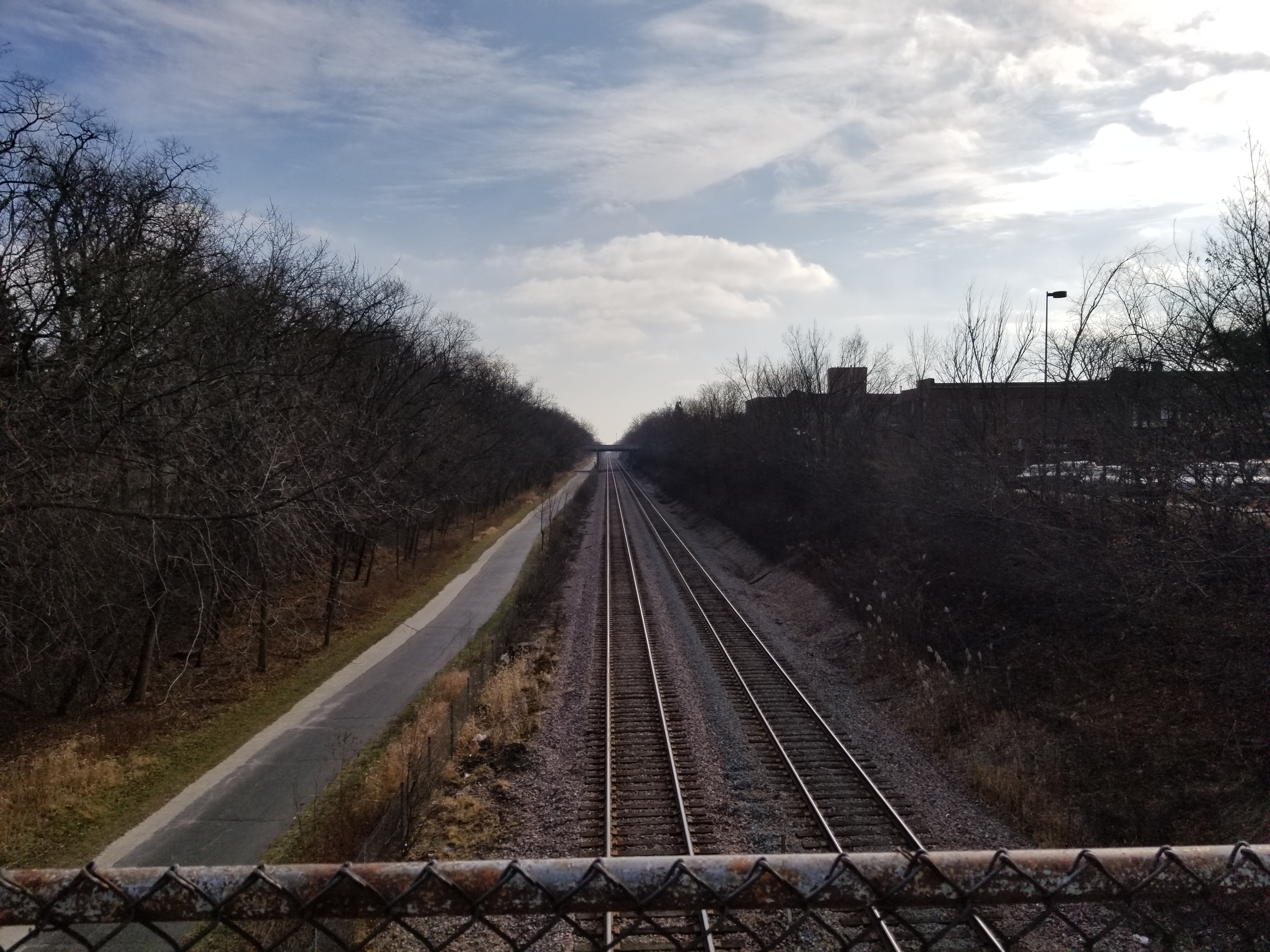
The Green Bay Trail runs parallel to the Metra Union Pacific North Line in Cook County, as seen at Hubbard Woods in 2017

The Green Bay Trail has historical significance dating back nearly 12,000 years, when it is presumed that woolly mammoths traveled along it for migration during the Ice Age. This migration made it a destination for hunters of the time who also used to trail their prey. The path started from Chicago across two different routes: one starting from the current Michigan Ave. bridge north on what is now Rush Street and through Chicago Avenue in Evanston, and an alternate route running northwest to where Clark Street and North Avenue intersect today.

Following the Ice Age, the trail has little confirmed history until the 1600s when French explorers Jolliet and Marquette used it in their explorations of the Americas. Prior to that it has been assumed that the trail was used by American Indians for hunting and trading. The American Indian tribe that most likely used the trail was the Potawatomi, who may have used it until the early 1900s. In the beginning of the 1800s, when early settlers moved West towards Chicago, the trail served as a mail route between Fort Dearborn, Chicago, Illinois, and Fort Howard, Green Bay, Wisconsin. In 1832, the trail became an official post road by an Act of Congress. In 1836, the trail hosted its first stagecoach service between Chicago and Green Bay.

The trail began its modern-day service in 1836 when stagecoaches were used to carry passengers from Chicago to Green Bay with intermediate stops. It runs along the track bed of the former Chicago North Shore and Milwaukee Railroad, which runs parallel to the Union Pacific (then the Chicago & Northwestern) North Line. The Shore Line was abandoned in 1955; the right-of-way was then leased to the Green Bay Trail Committee for development. In 1965, the city of Winnetka purchased the section that traversed that city with the intention of developing it with the committee's involvement.

== Design and construction ==
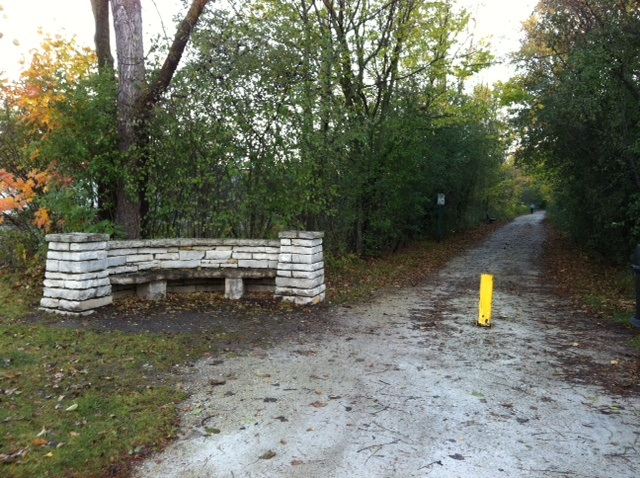
Limestone Bench designed by landscape architect Jen Jensen at Glencoe Trail Head, heading north toward Highland Park

Most of the rail trail is paved except for the portion between the Highland Park Metra station and Glencoe, which is primarily crushed stone. Running parallel to the Metra North Line, riders can access the train directly from the trail at the following Metra stops: Highland Park, Ravinia, Braeside, Glencoe, Hubbard Woods, Winnetka, Indian Hill, Kenilworth, and Wilmette. The trail is wheel-chair accessible. There is also an elevator at the Winnetka station that allows access to the trail. For the most part the trail follows a designated path except in Kenilworth where it runs along Abbotsford Road. In Glencoe, the trail also runs along Old Green Bay Road for less than one mile. The work of local landscape architect Jens Jensen can also be seen at various points throughout the trail. In August 2014 a crossover trail was installed running westward along Lake-Cook road to connect to the North Branch Trail.

== Amenities ==
The trail has parking at every trail head, which is also at every Metra station. It also has picnic areas in Shelton Park in Glencoe and in other community park areas in Winnetka and Kenilworth. Attractively designed benches are strategically placed for resting. In Highland Park, the trail travels through the site of the Ravinia Festival, the oldest outdoor music festival in the U.S. There are no bathrooms on the trail itself, but facilities are available at several parks and at many of the Metra stations along the route.

== Connecting trails ==
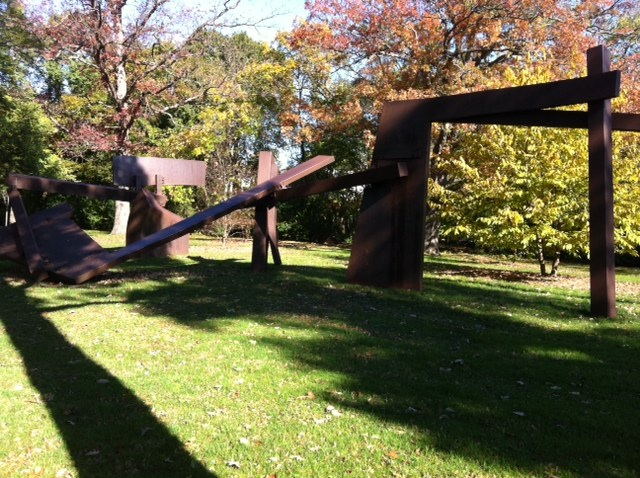
The Green Bay Trail has examples of art along the line.

The Green Bay Trail connects with several other recreational trails including:

- Sheridan Road sidewalk path, Wilmette.
- North Branch Trail, Highland Park.
- Des Plaines River Trail.
- Robert McClory Trail.
- Skokie Valley Trail (via North Branch Trail)

== Supporters ==
The Green Bay Trail is managed by each respective town that it runs through. However, when the trail opened in the 1960s, it was managed by The Green Bay Trail Committee. Volunteer beautifying projects including flower and vegetable gardens alongside the trail are also popular.

Environmental stewardship along the trail is coordinated by the Friends of the Green Bay Trail, a 501(c) non-profit organization created for this purpose in 2010.
