= Ravinia Festival =

Music festival

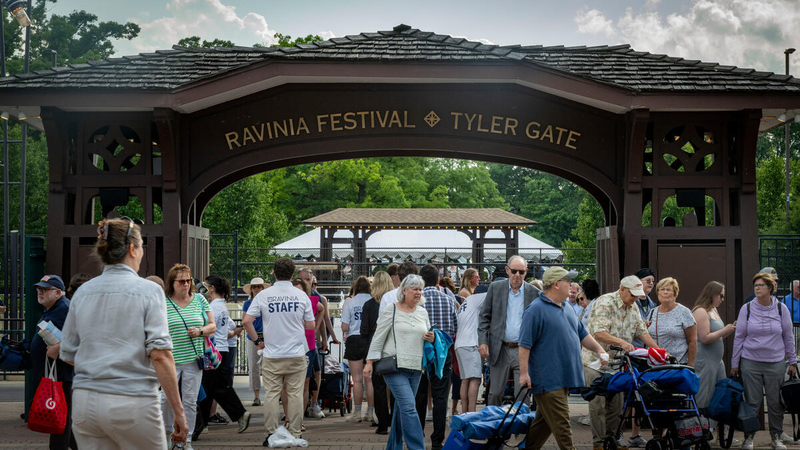
- Interactive map of Ravinia Festival
- Address: 200 Ravinia Park Road; Highland Park, Illinois; United States
- Coordinates: 42°9′29″N 87°46′37″W
- Owner: Chicago and Milwaukee Electric Railroad (1904–1911); Ravinia Festival Association (1911–present)
- Public transit: UPN at Ravinia Park

Construction
- Opened: August 15, 1904
- Years active: 1904–1931, 1936–2019, 2021–present

Website
- https://www.ravinia.org
- Ravinia Park Historic District
- U.S. National Register of Historic Places
- U.S. Historic district
- Location within Illinois
- Location: Roughly bounded by Lambert Tree Ave., Sheridan Rd., St. Johns Ave., Rambler Lane, and Ravinia Park Ave., Highland Park, Illinois
- Coordinates: 42°09′35″N 87°46′26″W
- Area: 36 acres (15 ha)
- Built: 1903
- Architects: Weber, Peter; Chicago & Milwaukee Electric RR
- Architectural style: Spanish
- MPS: Highland Park MRA
- NRHP reference No.: 82002575
- Added to NRHP: September 29, 1982

Ravinia Festival is a primarily outdoor music venue in Highland Park, Illinois. It hosts a series of outdoor concerts and performances every year from June to September in a wide variety of musical genres from classical to pop. The first orchestra to perform at Ravinia Festival was the New York Philharmonic under Walter Damrosch on June 17, 1905, with the Chicago Tribune praising its "musical entertainment so satisfying in quality and so delightful in environment." It has been the summer and fall home of the Chicago Symphony Orchestra (CSO) since 1936. Located in the Ravinia neighborhood, the venue operates on the grounds of the 36-acre (15 ha) Ravinia Park, with a variety of outdoor and indoor performing arts facilities, including the architectural prairie style Martin Theatre. The Ravinia Festival attracts about 400,000 listeners to some 100 to 120 events. Ravinia Park is on the National Register of Historic Places.

The Ravinia neighborhood, once an incorporated village before annexation in 1899, is actively maintained by the Ravinia Neighbors Association, who work to enhance and preserve Ravinia's architecture, history, and environment. The business district on Roger Williams Ave., within walking distance from the Ravinia Festival grounds, includes neighborhood service businesses and restaurants. Ravinia takes its name from the numerous steep-sided ravines that slice the shoreline near Lake Michigan.

== Overview ==
In 1904, the A.C. Frost Company created Ravinia as an amusement park intended to lure riders to the fledgling Chicago and Milwaukee Electric Railroad. The amusement park had a baseball diamond, electric fountain and refectory or casino building with dining rooms and a dance floor. The prairie-style Martin Theatre (then called Ravinia Theatre) is the only building on the grounds that dates back to that original construction. When the park's existence became jeopardized following the railroad's bankruptcy, local residents (for the most part Chicago businessmen) formed a corporation in 1911 to purchase and operate the park. Music was a confirmed summer activity from then on, except for a brief hiatus during the Great Depression and the COVID-19 pandemic.

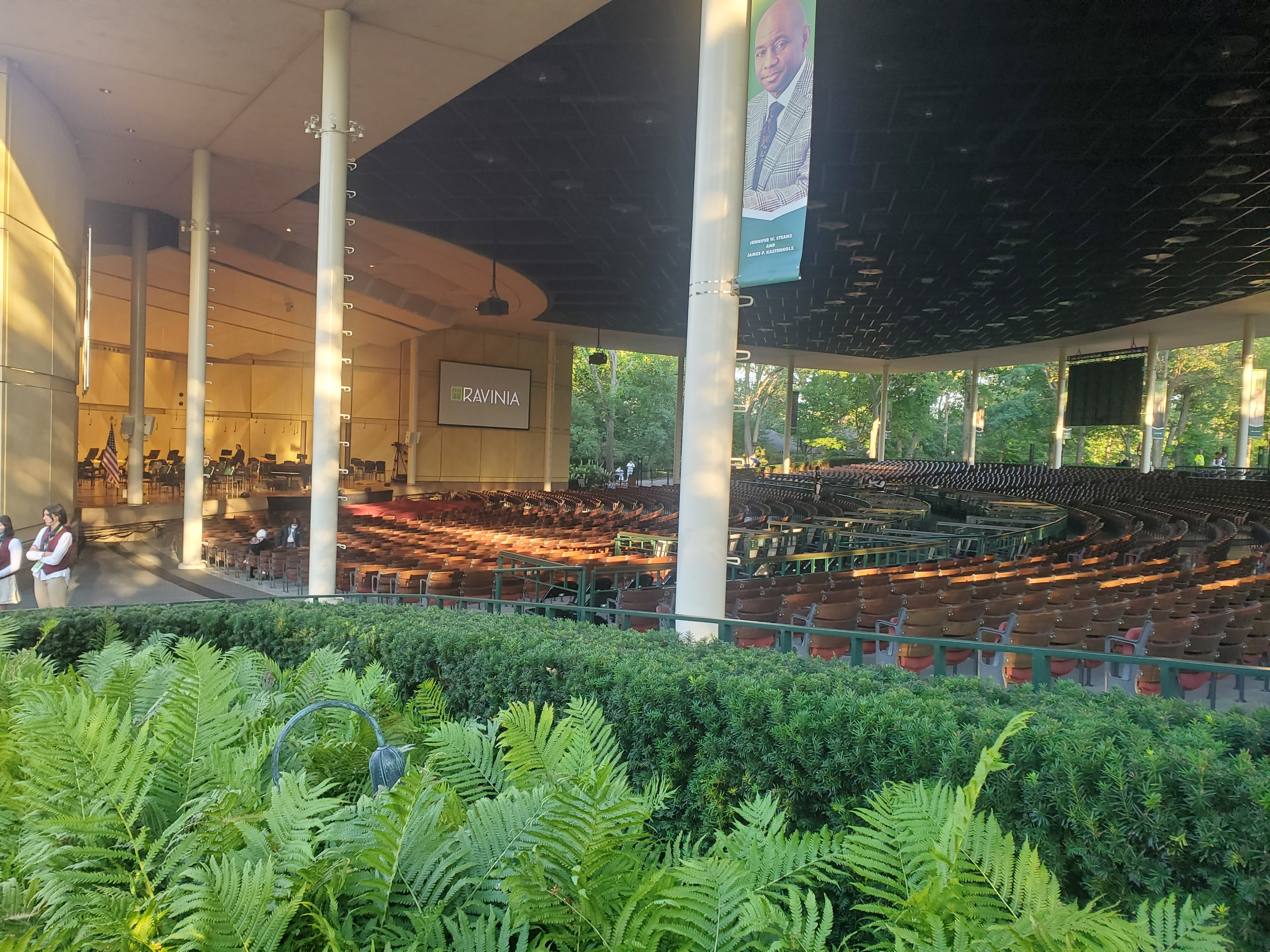
Pavilion seats and stage at the Ravinia Festival

The Ravinia Festival has been widely acclaimed throughout its history. In the 1920s, it was known as the summer opera capital of the world due to businessman Louis Eckstein, who booked all-opera seasons and artists from the Chicago Opera and New York Metropolitan Opera Companies. By 1930, Ravinia had featured performers including Yvonne Gall, Edward Johnson, and Giovanni Martinelli. However, the high costs of opera performances ultimately led to financial ruin for Ravinia, and it closed for four years. In 1936, North Shore residents raised enough funds to attract the Chicago Symphony Orchestra who then made Ravinia its permanent summer residence.

In addition to symphony concerts, often with guest soloists, the venue hosts opera, jazz, blues, folk, rock, and popular music performances, plus ballet, drama, and Reach Teach Play educational programs which take place year-round. These educational programs serve around 50,000 people each year in Chicago area schools without a music program. The longest running program—Jazz Mentors and Scholars—assembles the best Chicago Public School musicians with city musicians to create a larger ensemble.

Over the years, Ravinia Festival has hosted many famous artists. Recent artists who have performed at Ravinia include Kygo, John Legend, Aretha Franklin, Bryan Ferry, Diana Ross, Maroon 5, Common, Carrie Underwood, The Beach Boys, Tom Jones, Tony Bennett, Lady Gaga, Josh Groban, Dolly Parton, Sheryl Crow, Patti LaBelle, Andrew Bird, Darius Rucker, Mary J. Blige, Gladys Knight, James Taylor, Santana, Stevie Nicks, Patti LuPone, Smokey Robinson, Sting and John Mellencamp among others.

In November 2023, The Ravinia Festival Association, organizer of North America's oldest outdoor music festival, filed a federal lawsuit against Ravinia Brewing Company for trademark infringement, alleging that the brewery's use of the name and imagery is misleading consumers into believing there is a relationship with the festival. The dispute escalated following the opening of a second brewery location and release of a summer music-themed beer. The legal case concluded with a settlement resulting in the defendant changing its name to Steep Ravine Brewing Company.

== Performance venues ==
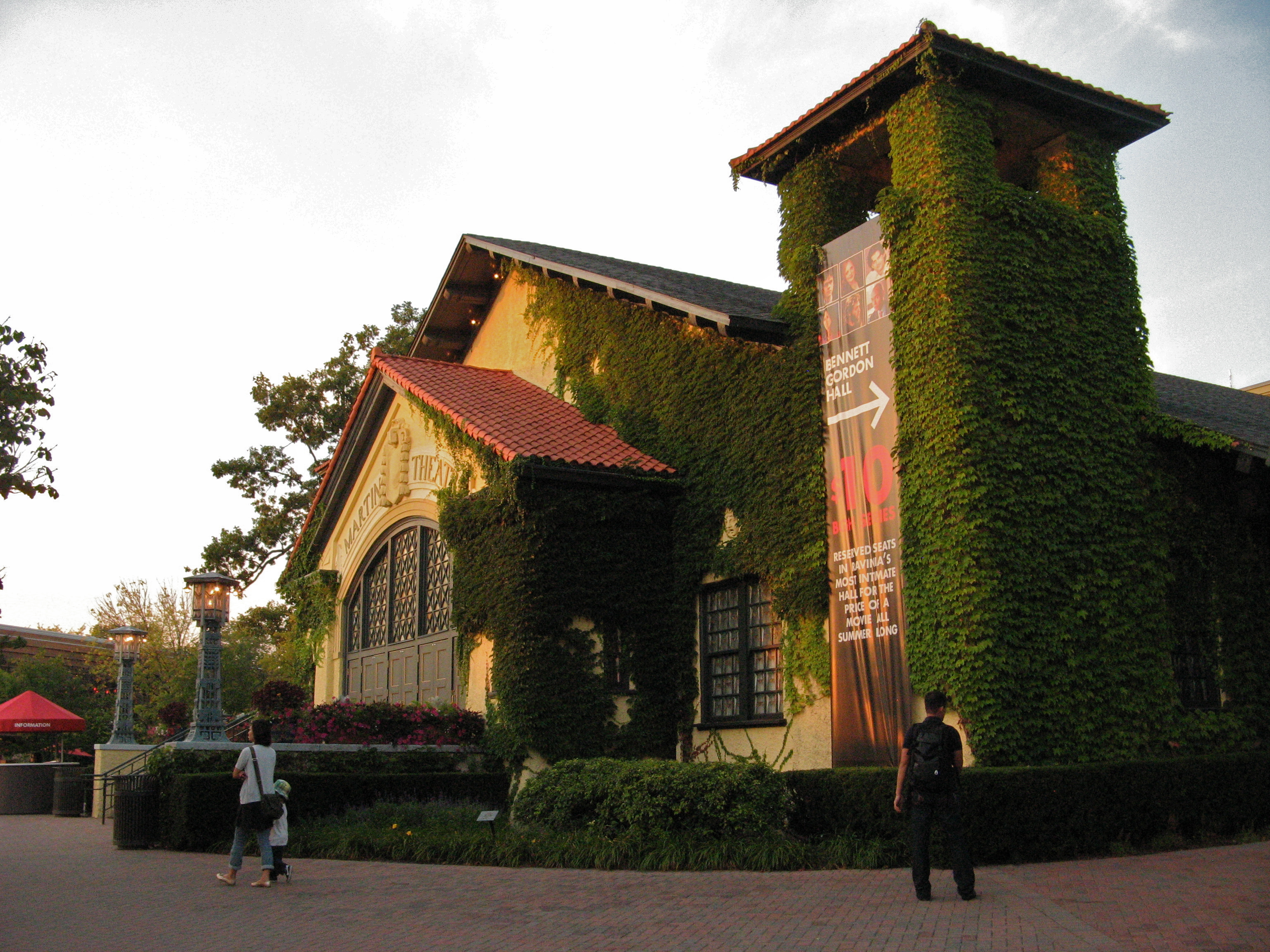
The Martin Theatre

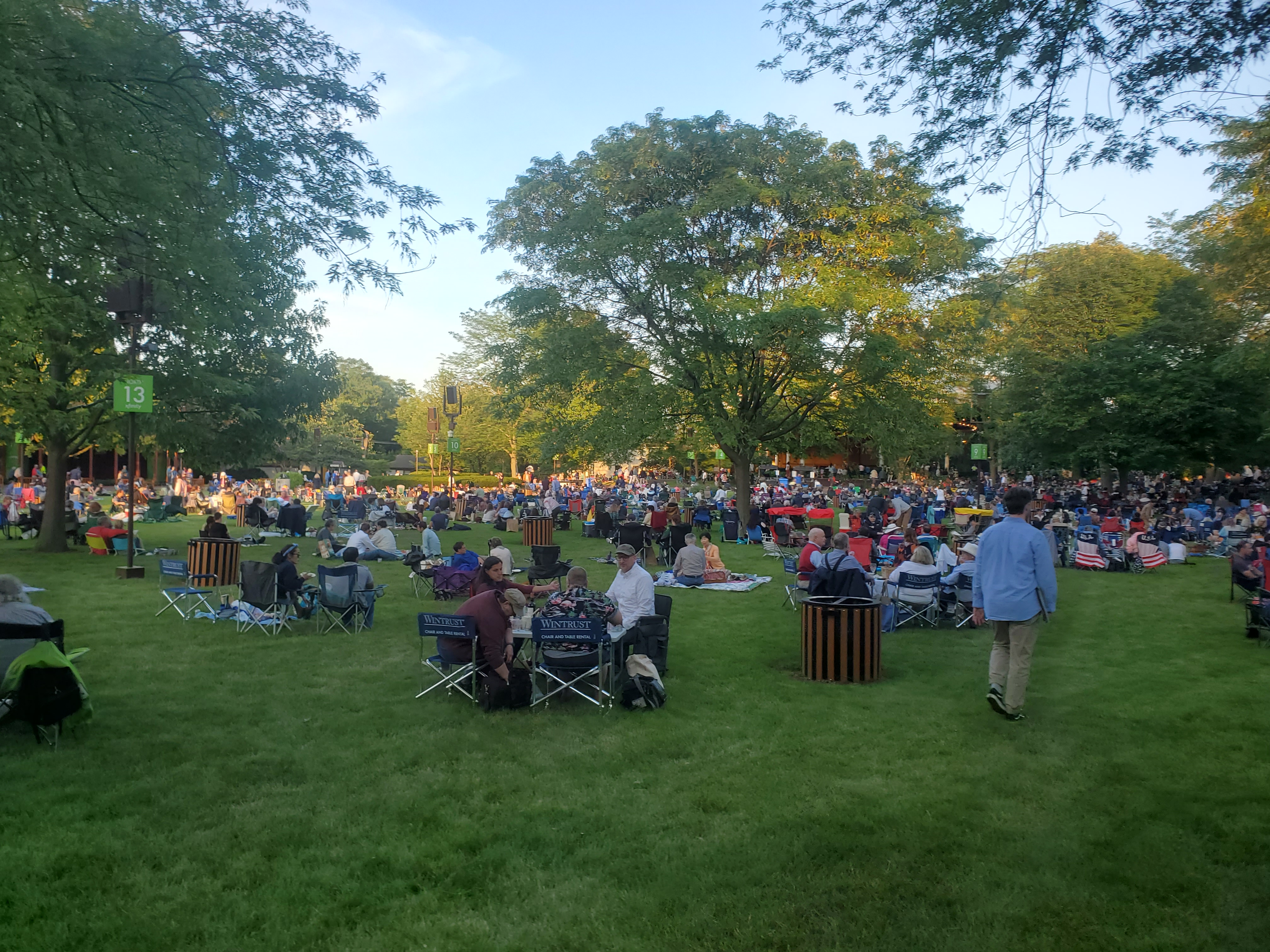
Lawn section at the Ravinia Festival

- Hunter Pavilion is the venue where the park's major music events and concerts—including Chicago Symphony Orchestra performances—are held. A 2026 renovation reduced the seats from 3,350 to 2,840 but made them more comfortable, improved acoustics and lighting, expanded backstage resources, and added an air circulation system.
- Martin Theatre is an 850-seat indoor hall often used for chamber music, semi-staged opera performances, children's concerts, and other shows.
- Bennett Gordon Hall is the 450-seat home of Ravinia's Steans Institute, and also used for pre-concert discussions and preview concerts. Ravinia's Steans Institute is the Ravinia Festival's pre-professional summer conservatory program. Three programs comprise the institute's summer season: the program for jazz; the program for piano and strings, and the program for singers.
- Sandra K. Crown Theater is a 100-seat live performance venue that provides a state-of-the-art experience of immersive audio and visuals as well as Ravinia's closest encounters with live music.
- The Carousel is located on the North Lawn and offers general admission seating for a more relaxed, laid-back experience. It hosts a variety of performances, including local and emerging artists, across genres like folk, jazz, and classical.
- The Lawn is an expansive area for picnics during performances. Music is broadcast via a sound system and a large video screen is sometimes displayed.

== Grounds ==
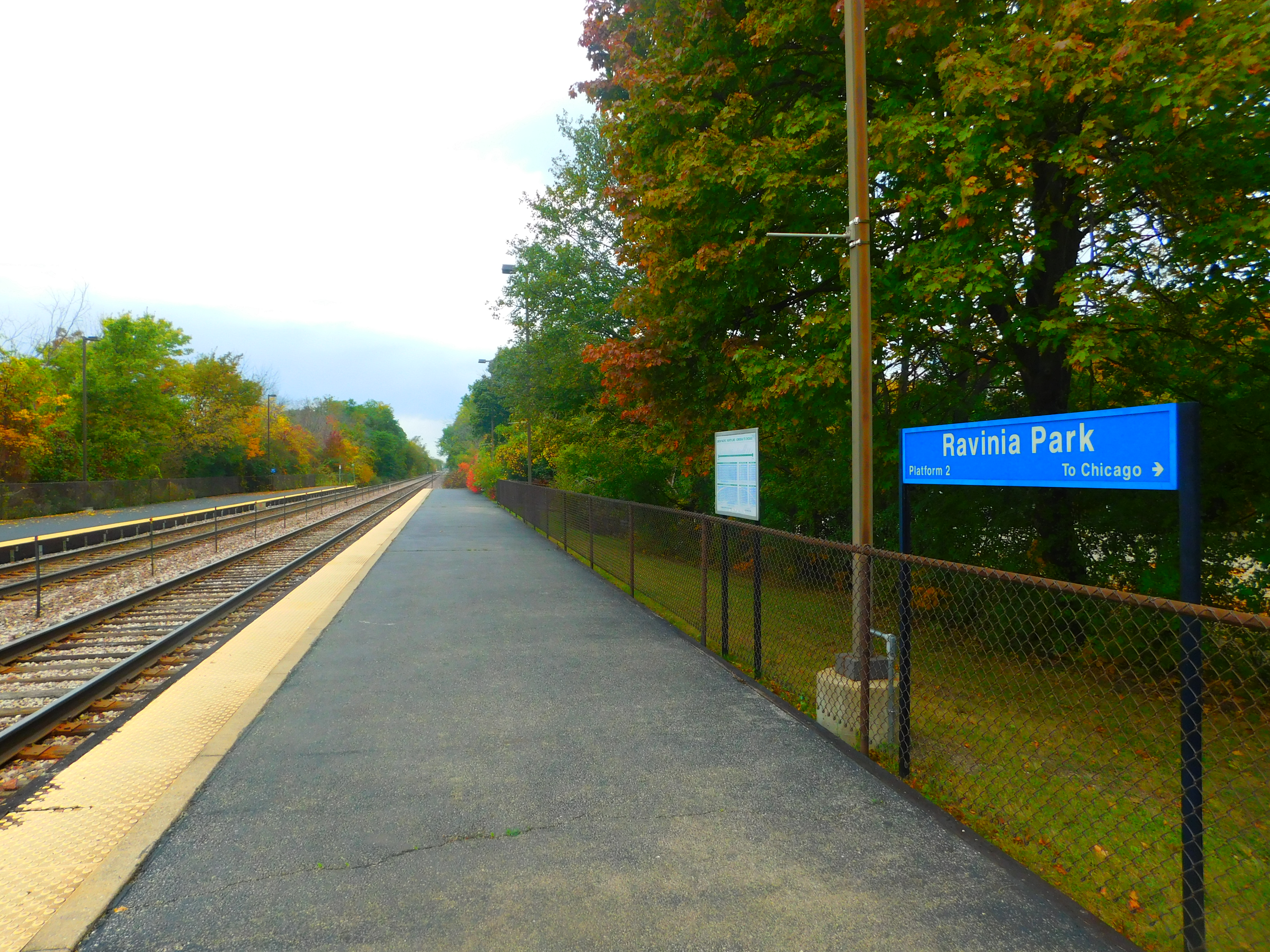
Ravinia Park station

For most attendees, Ravinia is experienced on the 36-acre (150,000 m^{2}) parkland and lawn. Ravinia is one of the few concert venues in the country to allow full meals to be brought in and consumed at concerts, including allowing alcoholic beverages. Accordingly, most grocery stores and specialty restaurants in and around the Highland Park area offer ready-to-eat Ravinia picnics for purchase.

Metra provides rail service to Ravinia Park on the Union Pacific North Line at a station outside the front gate with special stops before and after concerts. It is the last private train stop in Illinois. The noted British conductor Sir Thomas Beecham, who guest-conducted the CSO there in 1940, referred to Ravinia as "the only railway station with a resident orchestra." Visitors get dropped off and picked up right at the front gate.

== Artistic directors and leadership ==
- Walter Hendl, artistic director (1959–1963)
- Seiji Ozawa, music director (1964–1968)
  and principal conductor (1969)
- Edward Gordon, executive director (1968–1989)
- István Kertész, principal conductor (1970–1972)
- James Levine, music director (1973–1993)°
- Zarin Mehta, executive director, President & CEO (1990–2000)
- Christoph Eschenbach, music director (1995–2003)
- James Conlon, music director (2005–2015)
- Ramsey Lewis, artistic director, Jazz at Ravinia (1992–2022)
- Welz Kauffman, president and CEO (2000–2020)
- Marin Alsop, artistic curator (2018–2019) and chief conductor and curator (2020–2026)
- Jeffrey P. Haydon, president and CEO (2020–present)

° Levine was named "conductor laureate" in April 2017, to begin performances in summer 2018. On December 4, 2017, the Ravinia Festival severed all ties with Levine, in the wake of sexual abuse allegations against him, dating back to decades earlier at the Ravinia Festival.

== See also ==
- List of contemporary amphitheatres
- List of opera festivals
