= Ravinia Park station =

Seasonal rail station in Highland Park, Illinois

Ravinia Park

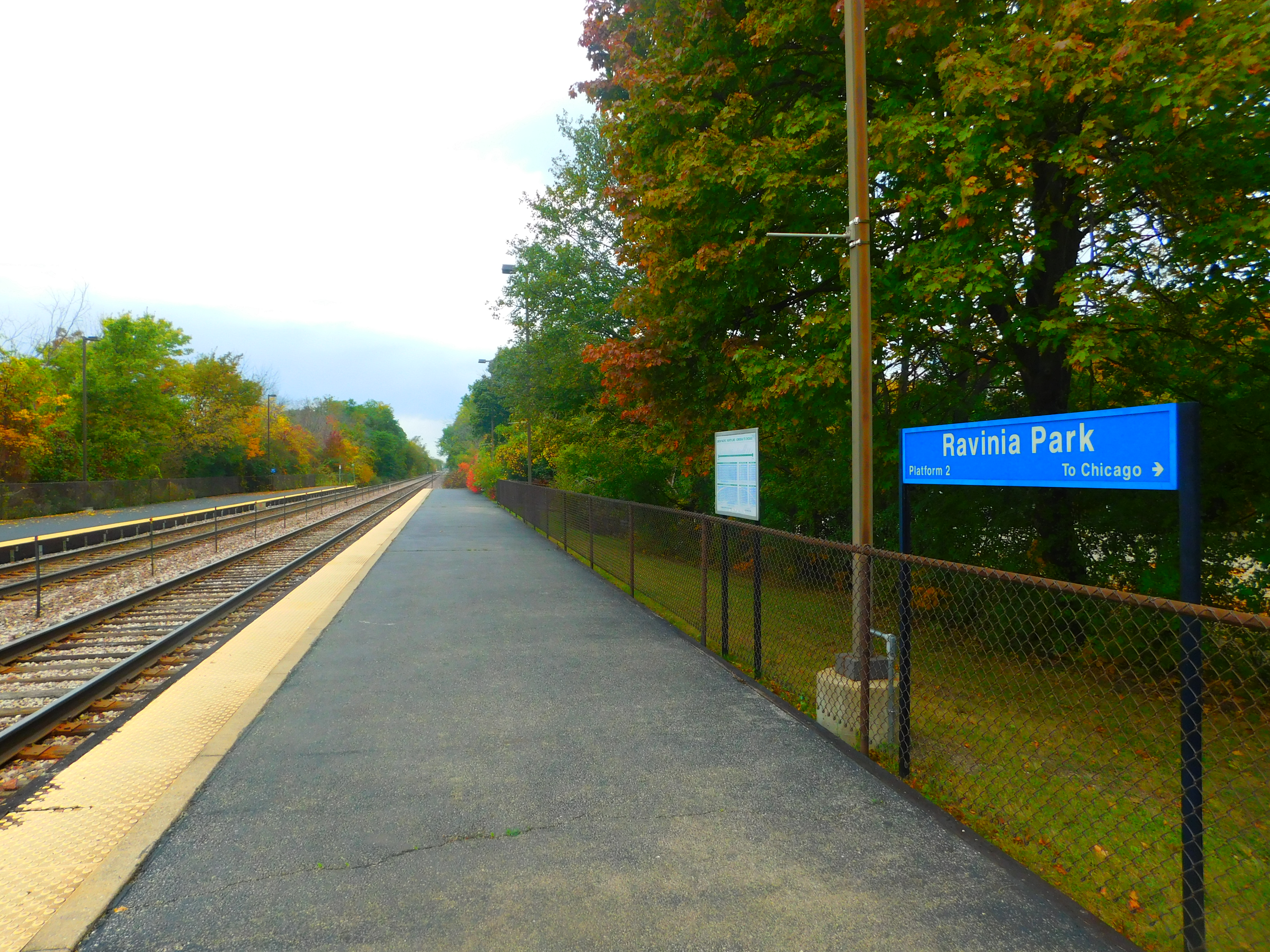
- Ravinia Park station in October 2015.

General information
- Location: Ravinia Festival; Highland Park, Illinois 60035
- Coordinates: 42.1581°N 87.7771°W
- Owner: Metra
- Platforms: 2 side platforms
- Tracks: 2

Construction
- Accessible: Yes

Other information
- Fare zone: 3

Services
Preceding station	Metra	Following station
Ravinia toward Kenosha	Union Pacific North	Braeside toward Ogilvie TC
Track layout
Location

Ravinia Park is a seasonal station on Metra's Union Pacific North Line located in Highland Park, Illinois. The station serves the Ravinia Festival and trains only stop at the Ravinia Park station during concert season. Ravinia Park is 20.9 miles (33.6 km) away from Ogilvie Transportation Center, the southern terminus of the Union Pacific North Line. In Metra's zone-based fare system, Ravinia Park is located in zone 3. Metra also honors dated concert e-tickets as a train fare to Ravinia on concert days. Ravinia Park has two side platforms which serve two tracks. Ravinia Park is the only seasonal station in the Metra system.

As of September 20, 2025, during the summer concert season, Ravinia Park is served by 18 trains (nine in each direction) on weekdays, and by 22 trains (10 inbound, 12 outbound) on weekends and holidays.

Additionally, on weekdays, one outbound train terminates here during the concert season.

During events on weekends, an extra outbound train (RAV-1) departs Ogilvie Transportation Center, makes all stops to Winnetka station, then runs express to Ravinia Park, where it terminates. An inbound train returns to Chicago after the event ends.

The Ravinia Park station was temporarily closed in 2020 due to the cancellation of all concerts for the Ravinia Festival in 2020 in response to the COVID-19 pandemic. Service to Ravinia Park resumed in the summer of 2021.

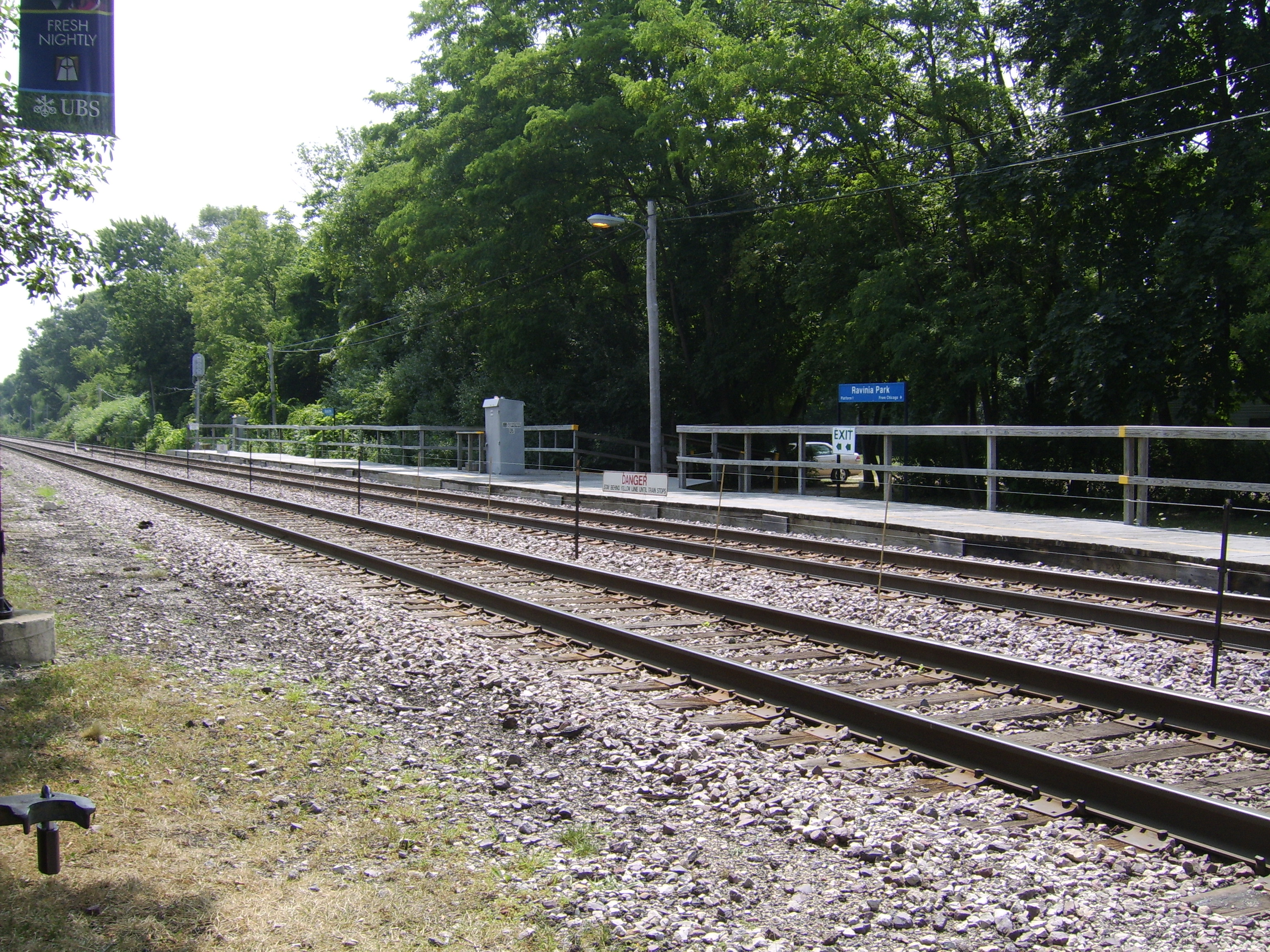
The station in 2008, when Ravinia Park station still had the old wooden platforms.
