= Deerfield =

Deerfield may refer to:

== Places ==
=== United States ===
- Deerfield, Illinois
  - Deerfield station
- Deerfield Township, Illinois (disambiguation)
- Deerfield, Indiana
- Deerfield, Iowa
- Deerfield Township, Chickasaw County, Iowa
- Deerfield, Kansas
- Deerfield, Lexington, Kentucky
- Deerfield, Maryland (disambiguation), multiple places
- Deerfield, Massachusetts, a New England town
  - Deerfield (CDP), Massachusetts, a village in the town
- Deerfield, Michigan
- Deerfield, Minnesota
- Deerfield Township, Minnesota (disambiguation), multiple places
- Deerfield Township, Michigan (disambiguation), multiple places
- Deerfield, Missouri
- Deerfield, New Hampshire
- Deerfield, New Jersey
- Deerfield Township, New Jersey
- Deerfield, New York
- Deerfield, Ohio (disambiguation)
- Deerfield Township, Ohio (disambiguation), multiple places
- Deerfield Township, Pennsylvania (disambiguation), multiple places
- Deerfield, South Dakota
- Deerfield, Virginia
- Deerfield, Wisconsin (disambiguation), multiple places

=== Elsewhere ===
- Deerfield, Nova Scotia, Canada

== Other uses ==
- Deerfield Academy, a school in Deerfield, Massachusetts
- Deerfield Residence, the residence in Dublin of the Ambassador of the United States to Ireland
- Deerfield River, in northwestern Massachusetts
- "Deerfield", the codename for an Itanium 2 processor
- Ruger Deerfield carbine, a .44 Magnum semi-automatic rifle

== See also ==
- Deerfield Beach, Florida
- Deerfield High School (disambiguation)
- Deerfield School (disambiguation)
- Deerfield Township (disambiguation)
- South Deerfield, Massachusetts
- Upper Deerfield Township, New Jersey
- West Deerfield Township, Lake County, Illinois
