= Deerfield Township, Illinois =

Deerfield Township, Illinois may refer to:

- Deerfield Township, Fulton County, Illinois
- Deerfield Township, Lake County, Illinois, the former name of Moraine Township, changed in 1998

== See also ==
- West Deerfield Township, Lake County, Illinois
- Deerfield Township (disambiguation)
