= Highland Park, Illinois =

- City
- City of Highland Park
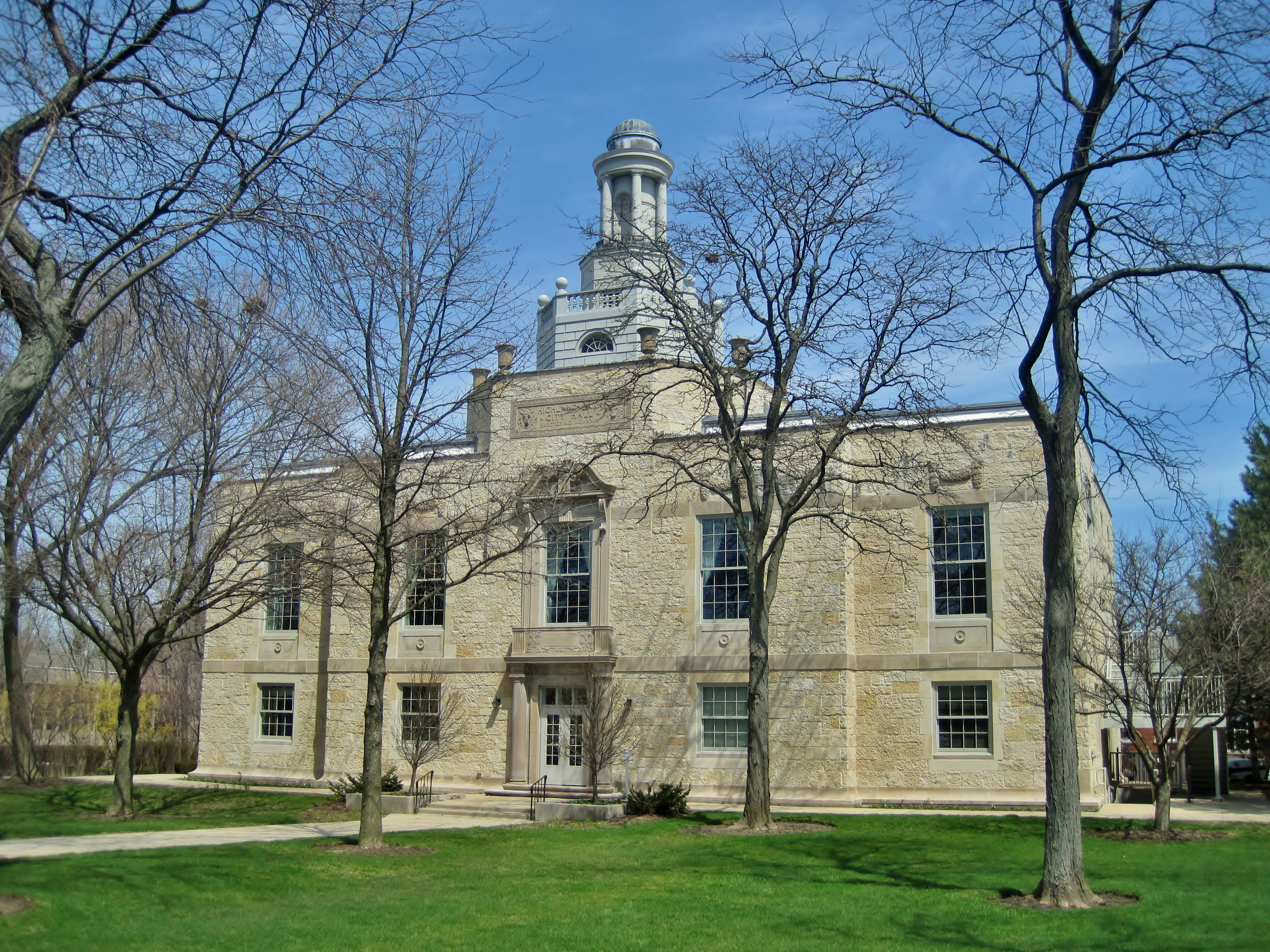
- Highland Park City Hall

- Seal Logo
- Interactive map of Highland Park, Illinois
- Location within Chicago metropolitan area Location within Illinois Location within the United States
- Coordinates: 42°10′56″N 87°48′37″W
- Country: United States
- State: Illinois
- County: Lake
- Townships: Moraine, West Deerfield
- Founded: 1869

Government
  - Mayor: Nancy Rotering
  - City Council: Councilmember: Anthony E. Blumberg; Barisa Meckler Bruckman; Jon Center; Annette Lidawer; Yumi Ross; Andrés Tapia

Area
  - Total: 12.27 sq mi (31.79 km^{2})
  - Land: 12.24 sq mi (31.71 km^{2})
  - Water: 0.031 sq mi (0.08 km^{2})
- Elevation: 646 ft (197 m)

Population (2020)
  - Total: 30,176
  - Density: 2,464.9/sq mi (951.72/km^{2})
- Time zone: UTC-6 (CST)
  - Summer (DST): UTC-5 (CDT)
- ZIP Codes: 60035, 60036, 60037
- Area codes: 847/224
- FIPS code: 17-34722
- GNIS feature ID: 2394377
- Website: cityhpil.com

Highland Park is a city in Lake County, Illinois, United States. Its population was 30,176 at the 2020 census. Highland Park is located on the North Shore of the Chicago metropolitan area, about 25 miles (40 km) north of downtown Chicago. According to the United States Census Bureau, the median household income in Highland Park exceeded an estimated $159,567 in 2022.

== History ==
A traveler in the area in 1833 described visiting a village of bark-covered structures where he ate roasted corn with a chief named Nic-sa-mah at a site likely located south of present-day Clavey Road and east of the Edens Expressway. In 1847, two German immigrants, John Hettinger and John Peterman founded a town along Lake Michigan, which they called St. John's. Soon, the town was abandoned, due to questions regarding ownership of the land. Three years later, another German immigrant, Jacob Clinton Bloom, founded Port Clinton, which happened to be just south of St. John's. Port Clinton was described by Elijah Middlebrook Haines as "one of the most promising villages in the city". In 1854, a lighthouse was built in Port Clinton, thanks to funding by the US Congress and sponsorships from Illinois representatives. Despite having a functioning lighthouse with a keeper, a pier, sawmill, and a plank road, Port Clinton did not have a train station in 1855. In 1860, Port Clinton stopped growing as a town, and the lighthouse was shut down.

In 1867, ten men purchased Highland Park for $39,198.70. They were the original stockholders of the Highland Park Building Company. Following construction of the Chicago and Milwaukee Railroad, a depot was established at Highland Park and a plat, extending south to Central Avenue, was laid out in 1856. At that point, Highland Park was settled on mostly scattered farms and undeveloped forested land. Highland Park was established as a city on March 11, 1869, with a population of 500, and evolved from the two settlements of St. John and Port Clinton; St. John's Avenue and Port Clinton Square are named after the settlements. Highland Park was named from its parklike setting at a lofty elevation relative to the lake, and was given its name from Walter S. Gurnee. The town annexed the village of Ravinia in 1899.

From its establishment in 1869 until November 1, 1900, Highland Park was a "dry" community, in which the sale of alcoholic drinks was prohibited.

During the era of private segregation covenants (~1900–1948) Highland Park was one of the few North Shore localities to permit residence by Jews, who were mostly barred from other North Shore towns such as Winnetka and Wilmette. As a result it developed a significant Jewish community that has endured to the present.

In 2013, Highland Park passed an ordinance banning assault weapons within the city. In 2015, the U.S. Court of Appeals for the Seventh Circuit upheld the ban, and later that year, the U.S. Supreme Court allowed the ruling to stand.

On July 4, 2022, a mass shooting occurred at a Fourth of July parade in Highland Park, killing seven people and injuring dozens more. A suspect was apprehended hours later and charged with first-degree murder.

== Geography ==
According to the 2021 census gazetteer files, Highland Park has a total area of 12.28 square miles (31.81 km^{2}), of which 12.24 square miles (31.70 km^{2}) (or 99.73%) is land and 0.03 square miles (0.08 km^{2}) (or 0.27%) is water. Its geographic features include a 100-foot-high (30 m) bluff running along 6 miles (10 km) of Lake Michigan shoreline and deep, wooded ravines extending up to 1 mile (1.6 km) inland. Elevations range from 580 to 725 feet (177 to 221 m) above sea level.

== Demographics ==
Historical population
Census	Pop.	Note	%±
1880	1,154		—
1890	2,163		87.4%
1900	2,806		29.7%
1910	4,209		50.0%
1920	6,167		46.5%
1930	12,203		97.9%
1940	14,476		18.6%
1950	16,808		16.1%
1960	25,532		51.9%
1970	32,263		26.4%
1980	30,599		−5.2%
1990	30,575		−0.1%
2000	31,365		2.6%
2010	29,763		−5.1%
2020	30,176		1.4%
2021 (est.)	30,177		0.0%
U.S. Decennial Census; 2020 Census

=== Racial and ethnic composition ===
Highland Park city, Illinois – Racial and ethnic composition Note: the US Census treats Hispanic/Latino as an ethnic category. This table excludes Latinos from the racial categories and assigns them to a separate category. Hispanics/Latinos may be of any race.
Race / Ethnicity (NH = Non-Hispanic)	Pop 2000	Pop 2010	Pop 2020	% 2000	% 2010	% 2020
White alone (NH)	27,112	25,845	24,825	86.44%	86.84%	82.27%
Black or African American alone (NH)	488	516	462	1.56%	1.73%	1.53%
Native American or Alaska Native alone (NH)	8	22	25	0.03%	0.07%	0.08%
Asian alone (NH)	707	848	1,094	2.25%	2.85%	3.63%
Native Hawaiian or Pacific Islander alone (NH)	2	9	0	0.01%	0.03%	0.00%
Other race alone (NH)	29	27	134	0.09%	0.09%	0.44%
Mixed race or Multiracial (NH)	227	329	948	0.72%	1.11%	3.14%
Hispanic or Latino (any race)	2,792	2,167	2,688	8.90%	7.28%	8.91%
Total	31,365	29,763	30,176	100.00%	100.00%	100.00%

=== 2020 census ===
As of the 2020 census, Highland Park had a population of 30,176 residing in 11,557 households and 8,637 families. The population density was 2,458.33 inhabitants per square mile (949.17/km^{2}).

The median age was 46.6 years. 22.7% of residents were under the age of 18 and 23.9% of residents were 65 years of age or older. For every 100 females there were 93.6 males, and for every 100 females age 18 and over there were 91.1 males age 18 and over.

100.0% of residents lived in urban areas, while 0.0% lived in rural areas.

Of the 11,557 households, 31.8% had children under the age of 18 living in them. 64.6% were married-couple households, 10.6% were households with a male householder and no spouse or partner present, and 21.5% were households with a female householder and no spouse or partner present. About 22.8% of all households were made up of individuals and 13.7% had someone living alone who was 65 years of age or older.

There were 12,405 housing units, at an average density of 1,010.59 per square mile (390.19/km^{2}); 6.8% were vacant. The homeowner vacancy rate was 1.8% and the rental vacancy rate was 7.6%.

Racial composition as of the 2020 census
Race	Number	Percent
White	25,250	83.7%
Black or African American	487	1.6%
American Indian and Alaska Native	178	0.6%
Asian	1,104	3.7%
Native Hawaiian and Other Pacific Islander	1	0.0%
Some other race	959	3.2%
Two or more races	2,197	7.3%
Hispanic or Latino (of any race)	2,688	8.9%

=== Income ===
The median income for a household in the city was $147,067, and the median income for a family was $185,101. Males had a median income of $108,785 versus $52,803 for females. The per capita income for the city was $90,133. About 3.2% of families and 4.6% of the population were below the poverty line, including 3.5% of those under age 18 and 5.3% of those age 65 or over.

== Economy ==
The international headquarters of Solo Cup Company were previously located in Highland Park, before relocating to neighboring Lake Forest in 2009.

== Arts and culture ==
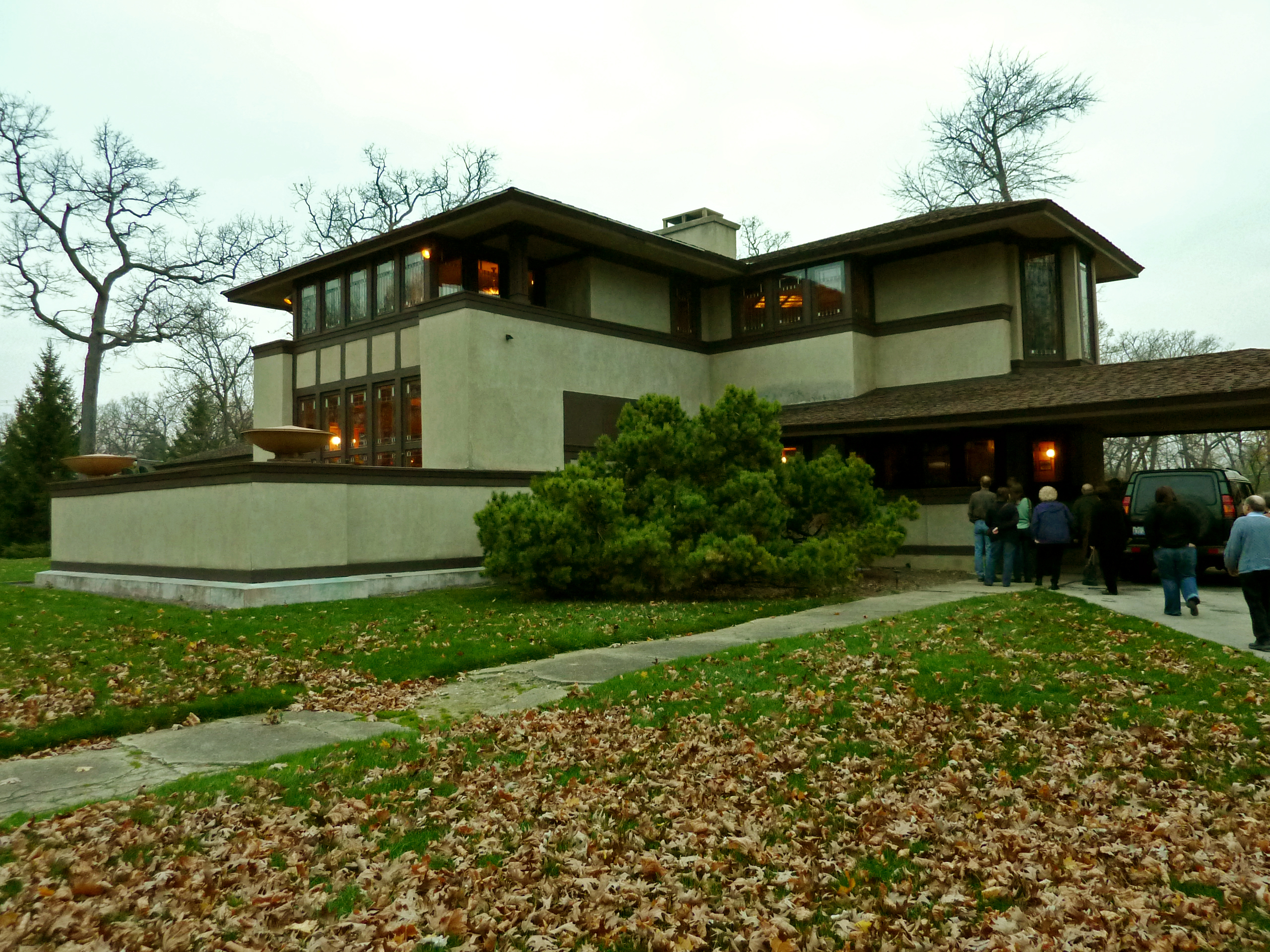
The Willits House

Highland Park has several attractions including a downtown shopping district and the Ravinia Festival. Ravinia Festival is an open-air pavilion seating 3,200, which hosts classical, pop, jazz and Latin concerts in the summers. It has been the summer home of the Chicago Symphony Orchestra since 1936. Concert-goers can purchase seats in the covered pavilion or tickets to sit on the lawn. Many visitors arrive early and picnic on the lawn before and during concerts. The festival is located in Ravinia District, originally an artists' colony, which still retains much of its early character and architecture.

Highland Park has several landmark structures listed in the National Register of Historic Places, notably the Willits House by Frank Lloyd Wright. In addition to several houses designed by Wright, the National Register lists homes designed by prominent architects including John S. Van Bergen, Howard Van Doren Shaw, Robert E. Seyfarth, and David Adler. Landscape architect Jens Jensen lived in Highland Park and designed a number of projects in the community that are listed on the register.

There are three public beaches in Highland Park: Rosewood Beach, Moraine Beach (part of which is available for off-leash dogs), and Park Avenue Beach (which also has a boating facility). Highland Park is also home to the North Shore Yacht Club.

== Government ==
The City of Highland Park is a council–manager government. The City Council consists of seven members, an elected mayor and six council members, all elected at-large and serving staggered four-year terms.

At the state level, Highland Park is part of the 58th House District, represented by Bob Morgan, and the 29th Senate District, represented by Julie Morrison. At the county level, the city is split between Districts 11 and 12, represented by former Highland Park City Councilman Paul Frank and former Lake Forest Mayor Mike Rummel, respectively.

=== Mayors ===
Mayors of Highland Park have included:

- Frank L. Hawkins (first mayor, elected April 13, 1869)
- Raymond Geraci (served 1970–1975 and 1995–1999)
- Daniel M. Pierce (served 1987–1995 and 1999–2003)
- Michael Belsky (served 2003–2011)
- Nancy Rotering (incumbent mayor since 2011)

== Education ==
North Shore School District 112 operates an early childhood center, seven elementary schools, and two middle schools.

Township High School District 113 operates Highland Park High School, as well as Deerfield High School in nearby Deerfield.

== Transportation ==
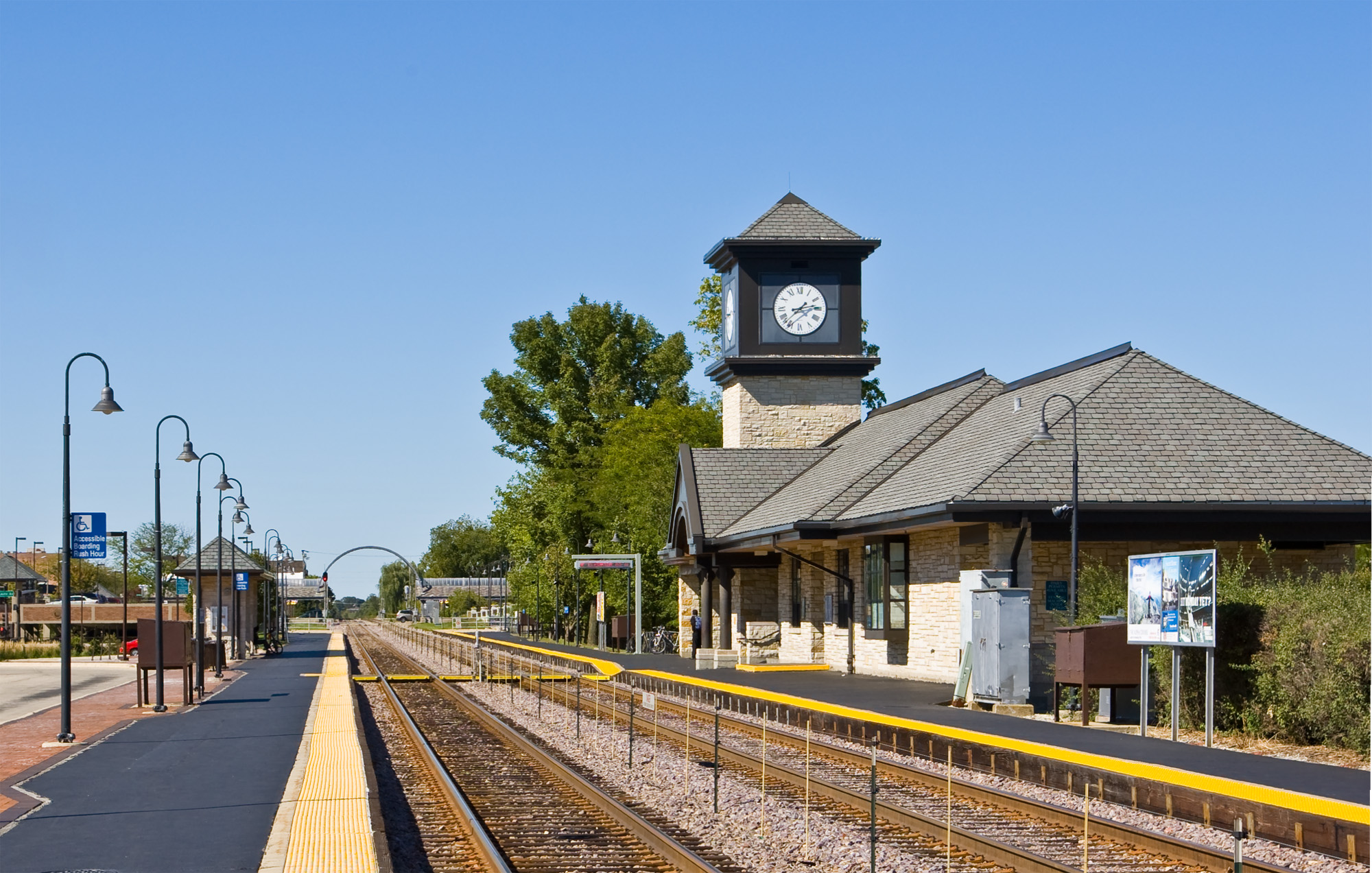
Highland Park Metra station

The main highway in Highland Park is US-41, which connects Chicago to Milwaukee. Commuter rail is available at four Metra stations within city borders (Braeside, Ravinia Park, Ravinia, and Highland Park), as well as two in nearby Highwood (Highwood and Fort Sheridan) on the Union Pacific North Line, which begins in Chicago and terminates in Kenosha, Wisconsin. Pace also offers several bus routes. Boat launch facilities are available along Lake Michigan. O'Hare International Airport is located approximately 20 miles (32 km) southwest. The Skokie Valley Trail runs through town.

== Notable people ==
Highland Park is popular with professional athletes, as the Chicago Bears practice facility is in nearby Lake Forest. Several members of the championship Chicago Bulls of 1990s also live or lived in Highland Park including Michael Jordan, Scottie Pippen, Toni Kukoc, B. J. Armstrong, and the late GM Jerry Krause, thanks to its proximity to the team's former practice facility in neighboring Deerfield. Current Phoenix Suns' CEO Josh Bartelstein grew up in Highland Park, as well.

Musician Richard Marx grew up in Highland Park, Smashing Pumpkins front man Billy Corgan resides here, Olympic figure skater Jason Brown attended high school in Highland Park, and actress Rachel Brosnahan from Amazon's The Marvelous Mrs. Maisel, grew up in Highland Park and attended Highland Park High School. Actor Gary Sinise attended Highland Park High School and co-founded the Steppenwolf Theatre in neighboring Deerfield.

Academy Award winning screenwriter William Goldman was raised in Highland Park.

Game of Thrones showrunner D. B. Weiss grew up in Highland Park and was inspired to get into screenwriting after hearing a talk by another Highland Parker, David Seltzer, screenwriter of The Omen and Lucas (1986 film), which he also directed. Prolific screenwriter Allan Loeb, too, hails from Highland Park.'

Award-winning novelist and short story writer Peter Orner and his brother, Eric Orner, a well-known cartoonist and graphic novelist, are both Highland Park natives.

Grace Slick, lead singer of Jefferson Airplane, was born in Highland Park, Robert Reed of The Brady Bunch, and journalist Jacob Scher lived here.

== In popular culture ==
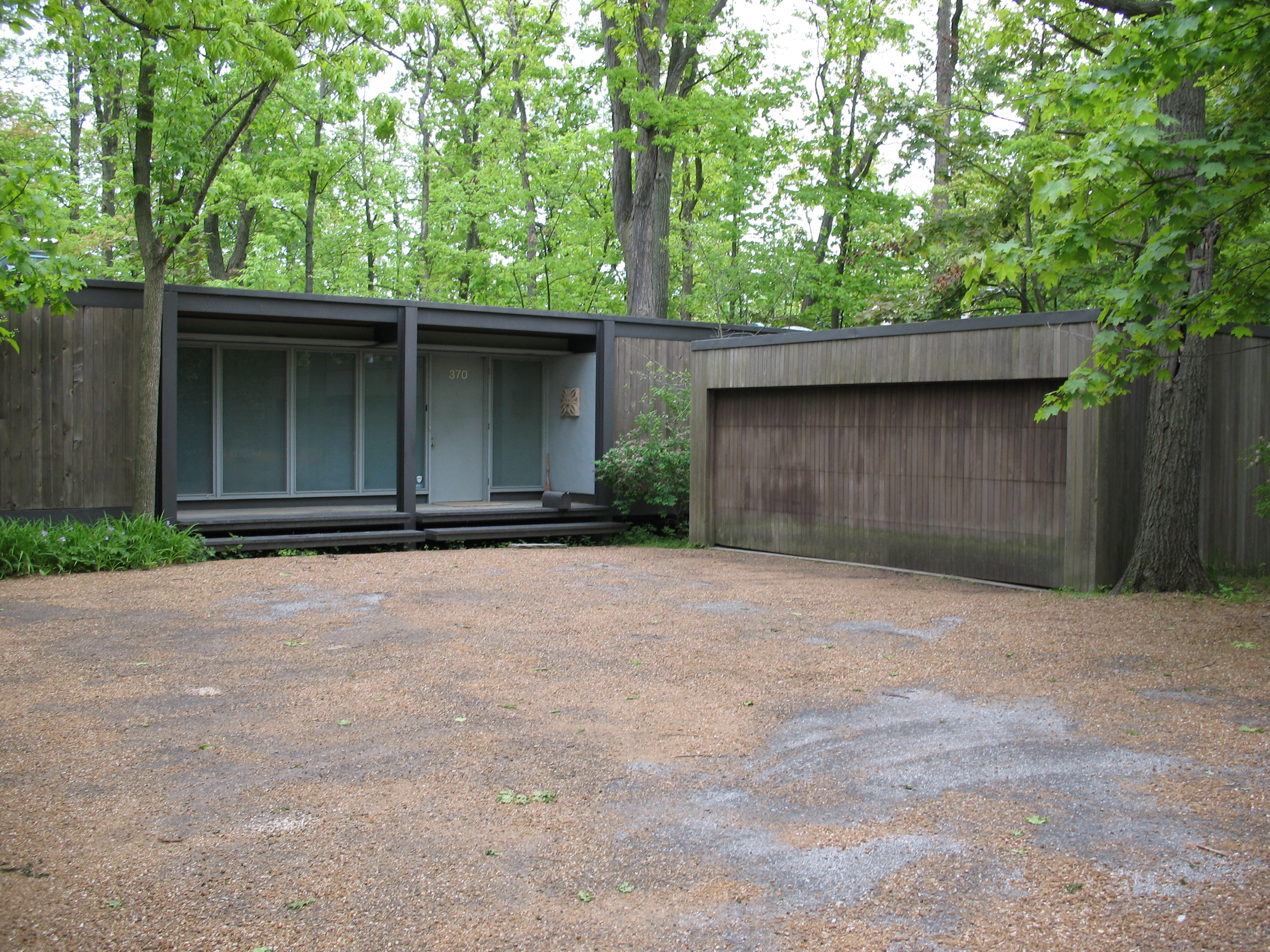
Ben Rose House used in Ferris Bueller's Day Off

Highland Park is the location of the main characters' former home in the CBS drama The Good Wife.

Highland Park was used for location shots for several movies written and directed by John Hughes in the 1980s including Ferris Bueller's Day Off, Weird Science, Sixteen Candles, Uncle Buck and Home Alone. Other popular films from the 1980s shot or partially set in Highland Park include Ordinary People, Risky Business, and Lucas. Since 2000, Highland Park movies have included Kicking & Screaming and Shattered Memories of Love. In the film Shattered Glass, Stephen Glass, portrayed by actor Hayden Christensen, makes repeated reference to his family's residence in Highland Park as an indication of the high expectations they have for his career.

Highland Park was where the cast of Oxygen's Bad Girls Club resided for its twelfth installment.

"Highland Park has the feel of a gated community without the actual gates", writes Vanity Fair, and has a tradition of "very clever minds who left to strike gold in Hollywood." The creators of the Revenge of the Nerds, Beethoven, and other films grew up in Highland Park.

It also was the setting for the 2000/2001 Fox and PBS documentary show American High.

== Sister cities ==
- Yeruham, Israel
- Modena, Italy
- Puerto Vallarta, Mexico

== See also ==
- Danny Cunniff Park
- Highland Park High School
- Highland Park Public Library
- Highland Park Hospital
- Highland Park Presbyterian Church
