= Highwood, Illinois =

- City
- City of Highwood
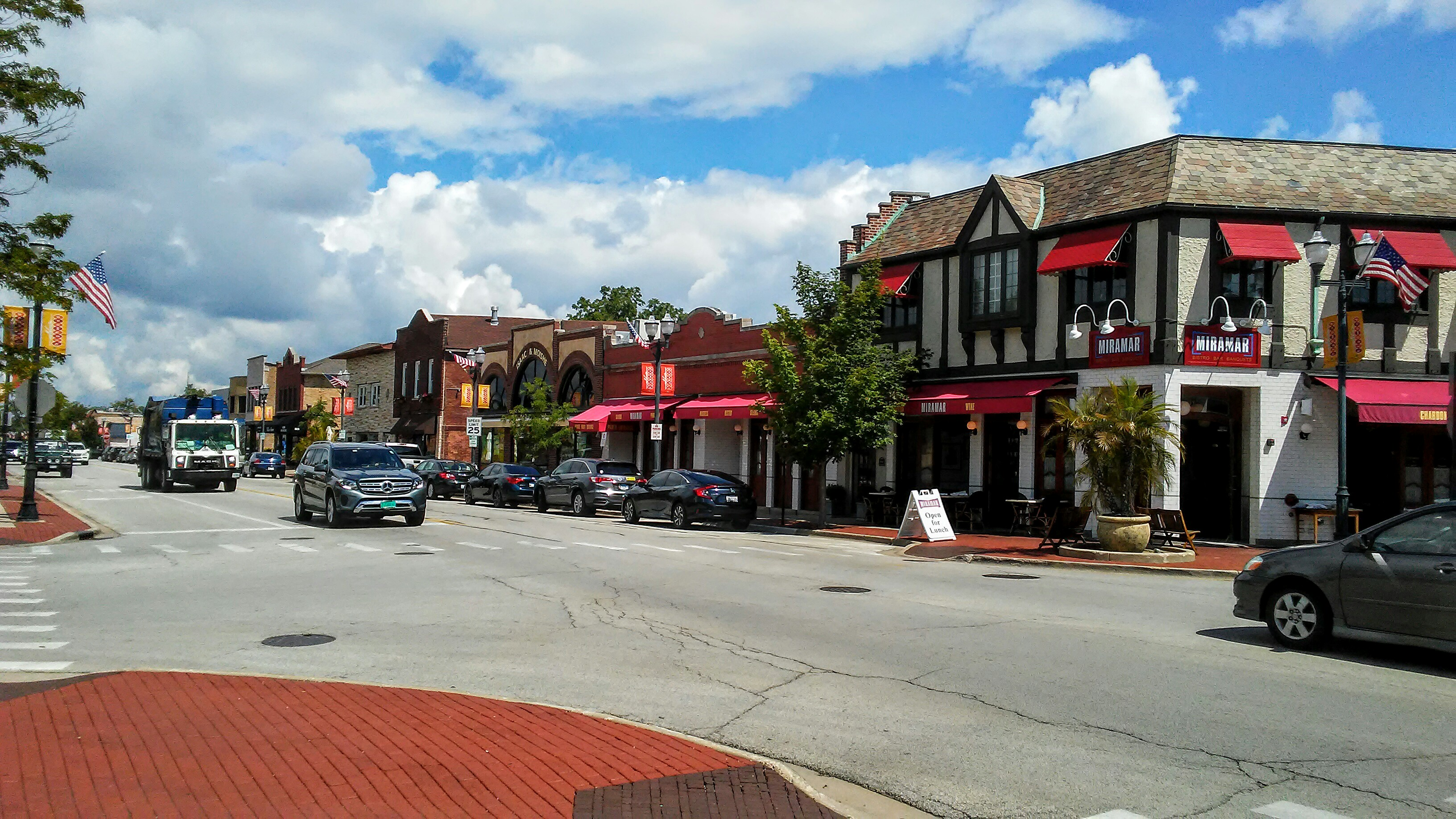
- Downtown Highwood

- Seal

- Location in Lake County, Illinois
- Coordinates: 42°12′22″N 87°48′47″W
- Country: United States
- State: Illinois
- County: Lake
- Township: Moraine

Area
  - Total: 0.72 sq mi (1.86 km^{2})
  - Land: 0.72 sq mi (1.86 km^{2})
  - Water: 0 sq mi (0.00 km^{2})
- Elevation: 689 ft (210 m)

Population (2020)
  - Total: 5,074
  - Density: 7,048.1/sq mi (2,721.29/km^{2})
- Time zone: UTC-6 (CST)
  - Summer (DST): UTC-5 (CDT)
- ZIP code: 60040
- Area code(s): 847, 224
- FIPS code: 17-34865
- GNIS feature ID: 2394379
- Website: www.cityofhighwood.com

Highwood is a North Shore suburb of Chicago in Moraine Township, Lake County, Illinois, United States, 28 miles (45 km) north of downtown Chicago. As of the 2020 census, the population was 5,074.

== History ==
Originally, the land was owned by the Potawatomi until it was ceded to the United States through the 1833 Treaty of Chicago. The first non-Native American settled in the town in 1846. In 1851 Highwood became the headquarter location of the Chicago North Shore and Milwaukee Railroad, which ran parallel to the Chicago and North Western Railway, and is known today as Metra's Union Pacific North Line. Thomas Curley suggested the name High Woods because the land was the highest ground between Chicago and Milwaukee and was covered with trees.

In 1886 civil and labor unrest in Chicago eventually led to the Haymarket Riot. Chicago businessmen felt that having a military presence near the city would help alleviate tensions within the city and on November 8, 1887, purchased Camp Highwood. This land would come to host members of the Sixth Infantry Regiment. On February 27, 1888, Camp Highwood was officially named Fort Sheridan in honor of General Philip Sheridan for his ability to maintain order after the Chicago Fire of 1871.

Highwood provided several business and employment opportunities and following the fire, many of those who lost their home and a wave of immigrants settled into the town. Highwood can also give credit to much of their economic success to the Chicago and Milwaukee Electric Railway. However, with increased transportation it also caused a sudden rise in gambling dens and illegal "blind-pig" taverns which catered to off duty soldiers. This eventually provoked federal authorities to enact the "Highwood Quadrangle" which prohibited the sale of liquor within 1 1/8th miles of the army base.

Fort Sheridan acted as an entertainment center for the town and on July 18, 1888, the trustees voted to change the name from Highwood to the Village of Fort Sheridan to capitalize on its military glamour. However, 8 years later in 1894 the name was changed back to Highwood due to resident frustration and confusion with postal misrouting. The city's business district became filled with bars and taverns which led Theodore Roosevelt to call the city "one of the toughest towns in America".

In the 1920s a large number of Northern Italian immigrants (originally from Modena) moved to Highwood, many from Dalzell, Illinois, a coal mining town in Bureau County, to seek jobs. The national prohibition of alcohol at the time also attracted bootleggers who smuggled large quantities of liquor into the city. The fight to prevent Highwood from being known as a whisky den largely brought the community together.

Following the start of World War II Fort Sheridan was used as an active training ground. By the end of the war Highwood had experienced another wave of immigration, this time a majority of immigrants coming from Europe and Mexico. Since then Highwood's business have continued to flourish and the city has become the destination for North Shore dining and nightlife. The city frequently hosts festivals for residents known as Celebrate Highwood which is hosted by the city chambers.

As of 2026, the town is constructing a new apartment unit named Highwood 400, with expected residency to start in 2027 with completion within the same year. It's being built right next to the Metra station located next to it on UP North Line route, providing upcoming tenants convenience in flexibility on transportation on top of access to businesses

== Geography ==
Highwood is located in southeastern Lake County on a ridge 100 feet (30 m) above the elevation of Lake Michigan.

According to the 2021 census gazetteer files, Highwood has a total area of 0.72 square miles (1.86 km^{2}), all land.

The city is located next to Highland Park and Fort Sheridan, and south of the Fort Sheridan Forest Preserve.

== Demographics ==
Historical population
Census	Pop.	Note	%±
1890	451		—
1900	1,575		249.2%
1910	1,219		−22.6%
1920	1,446		18.6%
1930	3,590		148.3%
1940	3,707		3.3%
1950	3,813		2.9%
1960	4,499		18.0%
1970	4,973		10.5%
1980	5,455		9.7%
1990	5,331		−2.3%
2000	4,143		−22.3%
2010	5,405		30.5%
2020	5,074		−6.1%
U.S. Decennial Census; 2010 2020

=== Racial and ethnic composition ===
Highwood city, Illinois – Racial and ethnic composition Note: the US Census treats Hispanic/Latino as an ethnic category. This table excludes Latinos from the racial categories and assigns them to a separate category. Hispanics/Latinos may be of any race.
Race / Ethnicity (NH = Non-Hispanic)	Pop 2000	Pop 2010	Pop 2020	% 2010	% 2010	% 2020
White alone (NH)	2,347	2,079	2,071	56.65%	38.46%	40.82%
Black or African American alone (NH)	79	72	110	1.91%	1.33%	2.17%
Native American or Alaska Native alone (NH)	9	3	8	0.22%	0.06%	0.16%
Asian alone (NH)	86	114	137	2.08%	2.11%	2.70%
Native Hawaiian or Pacific Islander alone (NH)	2	1	0	0.05%	0.02%	0.00%
Other race alone (NH)	9	16	23	0.22%	0.30%	0.45%
Mixed race or Multiracial (NH)	27	46	127	0.65%	0.85%	2.50%
Hispanic or Latino (any race)	1,584	3,074	2,598	38.23%	56.87%	51.20%
Total	4,143	5,405	5,074	100.00%	100.00%	100.00%

=== 2020 census ===
As of the 2020 census, there were 5,074 people, 1,867 households, and 1,267 families residing in the city. The median age was 37.8 years. 23.7% of residents were under the age of 18 and 14.1% were 65 years of age or older. For every 100 females, there were 98.6 males, and for every 100 females age 18 and over, there were 98.7 males age 18 and over.

There were 1,980 housing units. The population density was 7,047.22 inhabitants per square mile (2,720.95/km^{2}), and the average housing unit density was 2,750.00 per square mile (1,061.78/km^{2}). Of housing units, 5.7% were vacant; the homeowner vacancy rate was 1.5% and the rental vacancy rate was 4.3%.

100.0% of residents lived in urban areas, while 0.0% lived in rural areas.

Of households, 35.5% had children under the age of 18 living in them. Of all households, 41.8% were married-couple households, 21.5% were households with a male householder and no spouse or partner present, and 28.3% were households with a female householder and no spouse or partner present. About 28.9% of all households were made up of individuals and 10.2% had someone living alone who was 65 years of age or older.

=== Income and poverty ===
The median income for a household in the city was $74,875, and the median income for a family was $96,449. Males had a median income of $36,427 versus $27,783 for females. The per capita income for the city was $37,861. About 15.3% of families and 16.2% of the population were below the poverty line, including 26.5% of those under age 18 and 1.3% of those age 65 or over.

== Government ==
Highwood operates a council–manager government.

City Council Members
Position	Name	Term
Mayor	Charlie Pecaro	2025-2029
Alderman	Robyn Bauer	2025-2029
Alderman	George Markoutsas	2025-2029
Alderman	Krista Hanson	2025-2029
Alderman	Andy Peterson	2023-2027
Alderman	Mike Fiore	2023-2027
Alderman	Joseph Nebolsky	2026-2027

== Transportation ==
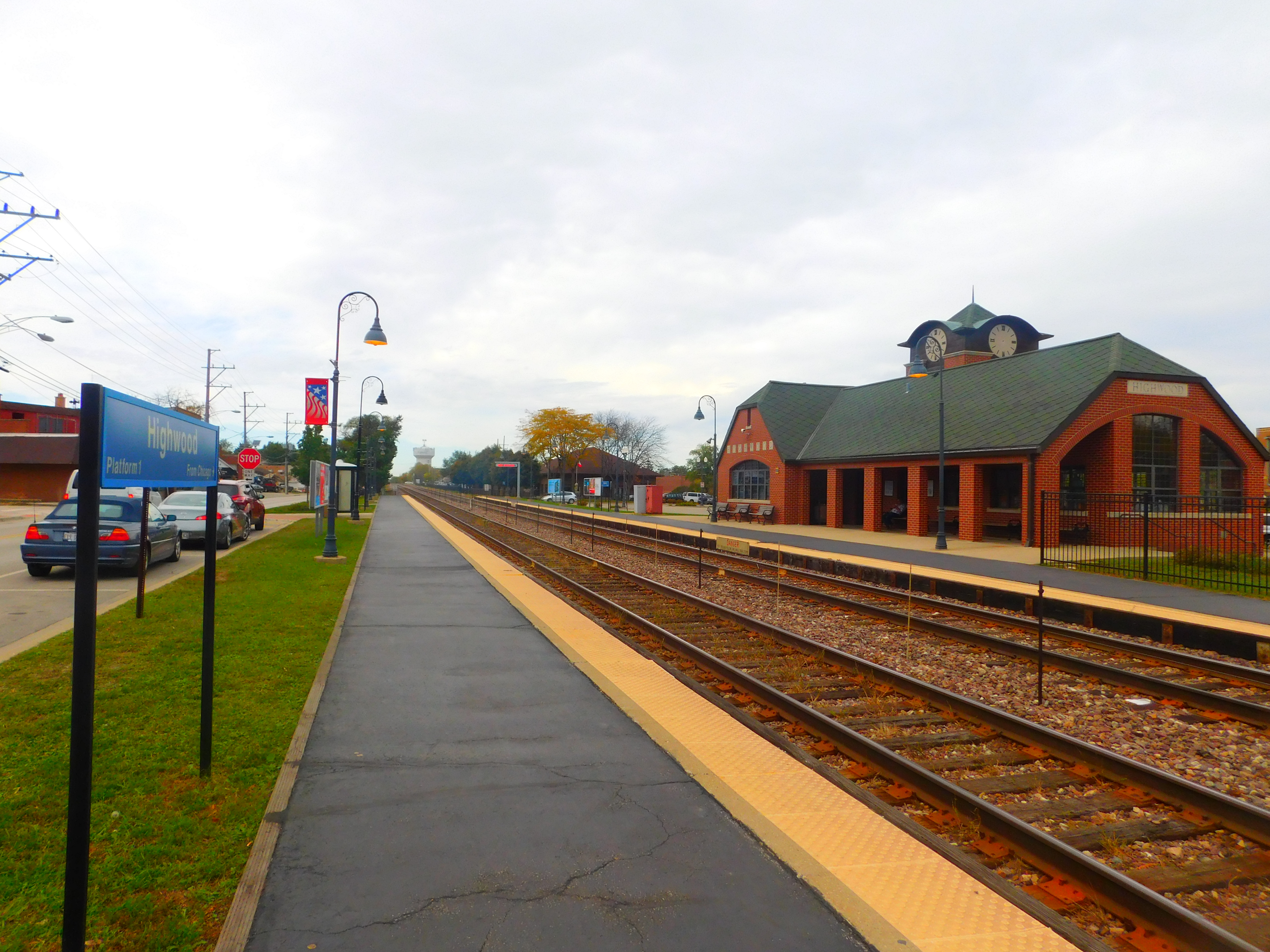
Highwood Metra Station located within the downtown of the city

The main highway to Highwood is U.S. Route 41, which connects Chicago to Milwaukee. Commuter rail is available at two different Metra stations locations within the city (Fort Sheridan and Highwood). Highwood is also located near the Highland Park and Lake Forest stations which all located on the Union Pacific North Line which begins in Kenosha and ends in the downtown area of Chicago at Ogilvie Transportation Center.

Pace provides bus service on Route 472 connecting Highwood to Highland Park, Fort Sheridan, and other destinations.

The city is approximately 22 miles (35 km) from O'Hare International Airport and 31 miles (50 km) from Midway International Airport.

== Education ==
Highwood residents are served by North Shore School District 112 and Township High School District 113. The majority of Highwood's children attend Oak Terrace School for Kindergarten through fifth grade, Northwood Junior High School for sixth through eighth grade, and Highland Park High School for grades nine through twelve.

St. James School was a private Catholic school located in Highwood, but closed in 2015 due to a lack of funding and low enrollment.

== Recreation ==
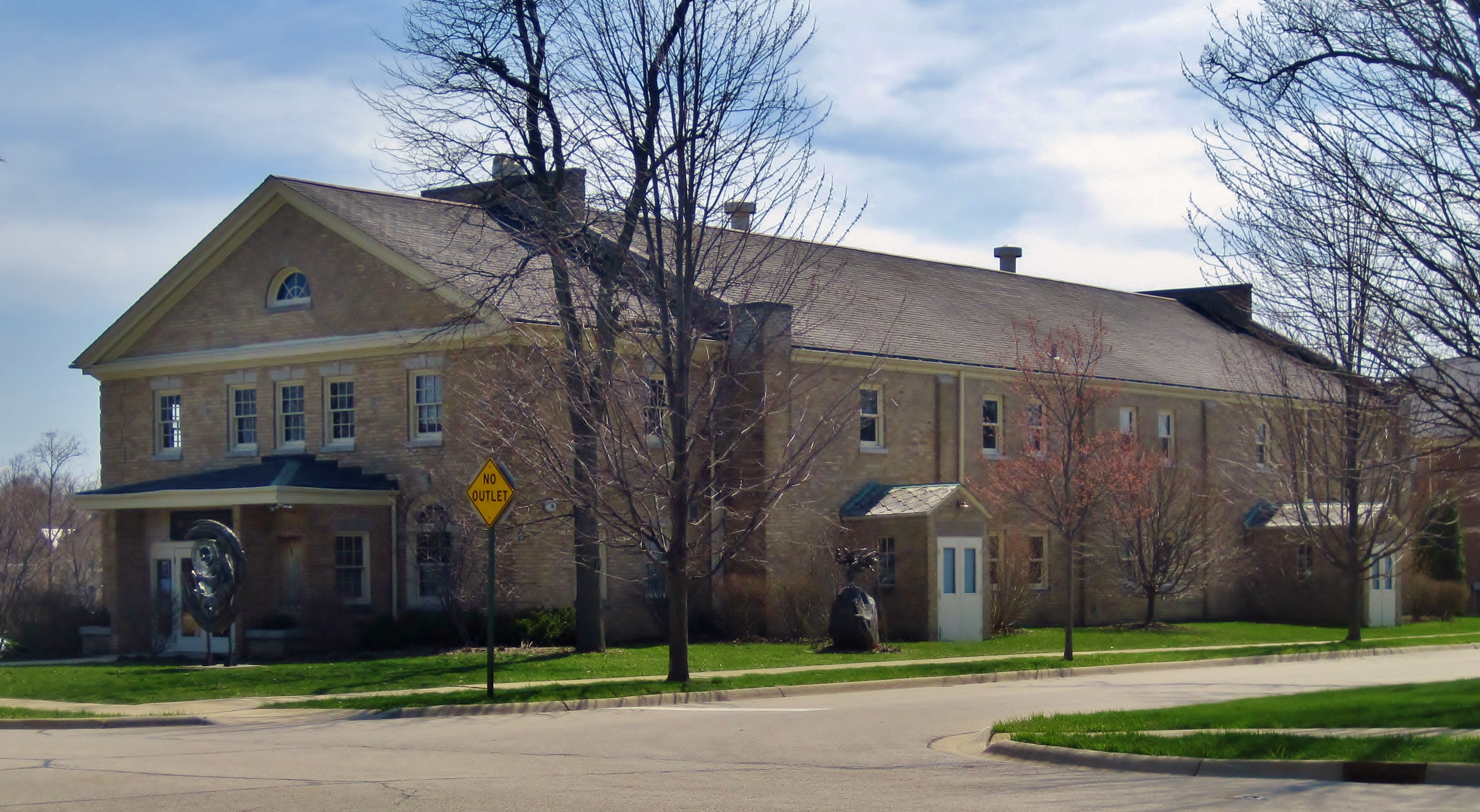
Once the movie theater for troops stationed at the army base, it is now the studio for Julie Rotblatt-Amrany and Omri Amrany, who are best known for the sculpture of Michael Jordan outside of the United Center

The Don Skrinar Recreation Center is a public recreation facility located near downtown Highwood. The city is also a host to the Midwest Young Artists Conservatory and The Performer's School. The Fine Art Studio of ROTBLATT-AMRANY which is owned by Julie Rotblatt Amrany is located within the old village of Fort Sheridan.

== Architecture ==
Arts and Crafts bungalows, such as these on North Avenue, are found throughout the city.

Brick commercial store fronts, such as these on Green Bay Road, often have offices or apartments above.

Highwood was settled in 1887 and was largely developed before the post-World War II building boom that led to much of the suburban development that characterizes Lake County. Therefore, the city has a large collection of pre-war residential and commercial structures that reflect the architecture popular during that period, including neo-classical, Italianate, and arts and crafts bungalow styles. Also common in the business district are brick commercial "store front" structures with commercial businesses on the ground floor and residential apartments above.

== Notable people ==
- Frank Bernardi, National Football League defensive back (1955–1960)
- Scott Drury, member of the Illinois House of Representatives (2013–2019)
- Lowell B. Komie, lawyer and writer
- Francis Joseph Magner, prelate of Catholic church; Bishop of Marquette (1941–1947)
