= The Poetry Forum =

The Poetry Forum, Inc., began in 1973 to arrange poetry workshops in the Deerfield, Illinois, area. In 1976, Suzanne Brabant and others founded the journal, RHINO Poetry, as an outlet for its workshop members' poems. The Poetry Forum moved to the Evanston, Illinois area around 1999, where The Poetry Forum's workshops are still held monthly. The Forum extended its workshops to central Illinois from 2002-2007. The Illinois Arts Council awarded The Poetry Forum grants for operating costs in 2007, 2008, and 2009. The Poetry Forum was founded by Suzanne Brabant, Lowell B. Komie, and Elizabeth Peterson. In 2005, Helen Degen Cohen (Halina Degenfisz), took over the Forum's mission of creating monthly workshops and readings for Evanston's poets.
