= Deerfield Township =

Deerfield Township may refer to the following places in the United States:

== Illinois ==
- Deerfield Township, Fulton County, Illinois
- Deerfield Township, Lake County, Illinois, former name of Moraine Township, until 1998

== Iowa ==
- Deerfield Township, Chickasaw County, Iowa

== Kansas ==
- Deerfield Township, Kearny County, Kansas

== Michigan ==
- Deerfield Township, Isabella County, Michigan
- Deerfield Township, Lapeer County, Michigan
- Deerfield Township, Lenawee County, Michigan
- Deerfield Township, Livingston County, Michigan
- Deerfield Township, Mecosta County, Michigan

== Minnesota ==
- Deerfield Township, Cass County, Minnesota
- Deerfield Township, Steele County, Minnesota

== Missouri ==
- Deerfield Township, Vernon County, Missouri

== New Jersey ==
- Deerfield Township, New Jersey

== Ohio ==
- Deerfield Township, Hamilton County, Ohio, a former township
- Deerfield Township, Morgan County, Ohio
- Deerfield Township, Portage County, Ohio
- Deerfield Township, Ross County, Ohio
- Deerfield Township, Warren County, Ohio

== Pennsylvania ==
- Deerfield Township, Tioga County, Pennsylvania
- Deerfield Township, Warren County, Pennsylvania

== See also ==
- Upper Deerfield Township, New Jersey
- West Deerfield Township, Lake County, Illinois
- Deerfield (disambiguation)
