= Township High School District =

A township high school district is a type of school district in the U.S. state of Illinois. Despite the name, such a district does not necessarily follow township boundaries anymore. (For example, District 211 and District 214, named below, each cover parts of Palatine Township in Cook County.)

Districts that use the name "Township High School District" and a number, but no further name, include:

- Township High School District 113 — the Lake County district of Deerfield High School and Highland Park High School
- Township High School District 211 — the Cook County district of James B. Conant High School, Fremd High School, Hoffman Estates High School, Palatine High School, and Schaumburg High School, and formerly known as Palatine Township High School District 211
- Township High School District 214 — the Cook County district of Elk Grove and Wheeling townships (and a part of Palatine Township), and containing Buffalo Grove High School, Elk Grove High School, John Hersey High School, Prospect High School, Rolling Meadows High School, and Wheeling High School, and formerly Arlington High School and Forest View High School

== See also ==
- List of school districts in Illinois — for other school districts with "Township High School District" in their names
