= Lake Bluff Uptown Commercial Historic District =

Historic district in Illinois, United States

- U.S. National Register of Historic Places
- U.S. Historic district
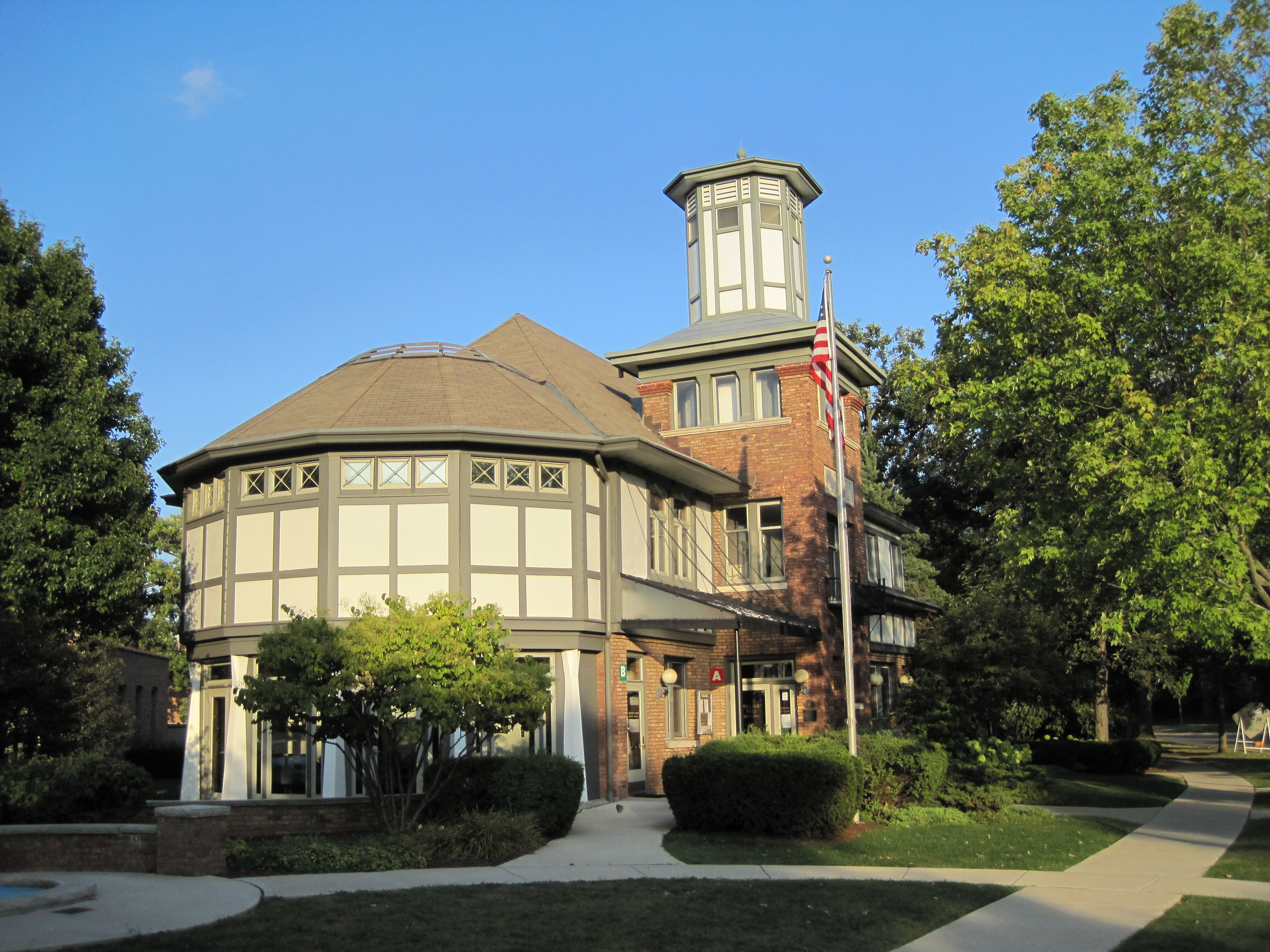
- Lake Bluff Village Hall

- Location within Illinois Location within the United States
- Location: 20, 31-113 E. Scranton, 26-40 (even) E. Center Ave., and 550 N. Sheridan, Lake Bluff, Illinois
- Coordinates: 42°16′46″N 87°50′40″W
- Area: 4.7 acres (1.9 ha)
- Built: 1904
- Architect: Frost & Granger (train station)
- Architectural style: Colonial Revival, Tudor Revival
- NRHP reference No.: 06001021
- Added to NRHP: November 15, 2006

The Lake Bluff Uptown Commercial Historic District is the historic downtown district of Lake Bluff, Illinois, United States. There are fourteen properties in the district; of these, six buildings, one site, and one object contribute to its historic fabric as contributing properties.

== History ==
Lake Bluff, Illinois was first settled in 1836. In the mid-1870s, the Lake Bluff Camp Meeting Association, a Methodist Episcopal camp, was founded on 200 acres (81 ha). Most structures at that point were of contemporary architectural styles, but were mostly one-story wood-frame buildings. In the late 1890ss, the Camp Meeting Association closed and its lands were immediately considered as a commercial district due to its proximity to the Chicago and North Western Railway tracks. The lands were platted in 1896.

James Hobbs, the former president of Camp Meeting Association and president of the Chicago Board of Trade, oversaw Lake Bluff's early development. The oldest building in the district is the Village Market, completed around 1900. It replaced a large, wood-framed building that was destroyed in a fire. Charles Helming ran the store from 1902 to 1947. Frost & Granger designed the Lake Bluff Train Station in 1904 to service the Chicago and North Western. The railway donated funds to construct a new city hall later that year. It was designed by Webster Tomlinson, a member of "The Eighteen" Prairie School architects. In 1911, several buildings were moved to create a village green. In 1917, the green was used as a rally for troops serving in World War I. This inspired the creation of a War Memorial in the green dedicated to the soldiers. Lake Bluff used funds left over from an ambulance fundraiser to construct the memorial in 1917. Tablets were later added for World War II, the Korean War, and the Vietnam War. The John Griffith Store Building was built for the namesake real estate developer in 1925. It neighbors a post office building. The Sankey Building was erected in 1926 on the corner of East Center and Scranton Avenues.

The district was recognized by the National Park Service with a listing on the National Register of Historic Places on November 15, 2006. The Griffith Store had previously been individually recognized on February 5, 2003.
