= Fort Sheridan =

Fort Sheridan may refer to:

- Camp Sheridan (Nebraska), an abandoned Army post sometimes called Fort Sheridan
- Fort Logan, a former military post in Denver, Colorado formerly named Fort Sheridan
- Fort Sheridan, Illinois, a residential neighborhood in Lake County, Illinois
  - Fort Sheridan station, a commuter rail station in Fort Sheridan, Highwood, Illinois
- Fort Sheridan Forest Preserve, a forest preserve operated by the Lake County Forest Preserves
- Fort Sheridan Historic District, a National Historic Landmark District in Fort Sheridan, Illinois
- Sheridan Reserve Center, an Army Reserve installation in Fort Sheridan, Illinois
