= Northfield Township, Illinois =

Northfield Township
- Township
- Seal

- Location in Cook County

- Cook County's location in Illinois
- Coordinates: 42°06′26″N 87°49′56″W
- Country: United States
- State: Illinois
- County: Cook
- Established: April 2, 1850

Government
  - Supervisor: Shiva Mohsenzadeh

Area
  - Total: 34.64 sq mi (89.72 km^{2})
  - Land: 34.30 sq mi (88.84 km^{2})
  - Water: 0.34 sq mi (0.89 km^{2}) 0.99%
- Elevation: 650 ft (198 m)

Population (2020)
  - Total: 91,565
  - Density: 2,669/sq mi (1,031/km^{2})
- Time zone: UTC-6 (CST)
  - Summer (DST): UTC-5 (CDT)
- ZIP codes: 60015, 60016, 60022, 60025, 60026, 60056, 60062, 60070, 60090, 60091, 60093
- FIPS code: 17-031-53676
- Website: northfieldtownship.com

Northfield Township is one of 29 townships in Cook County, Illinois, United States. As of the 2020 census, its population was 91,565. The township office is located at 2550 Waukegan Road (just south of Willow Road) in Glenview. The township was established on April 2, 1850.

== Geography ==
According to the United States Census Bureau, Northfield Township covers an area of 34.64 square miles (89.7 km^{2}); of this, 34.3 square miles (89 km^{2}) (99.02 percent) is land and 0.34 square miles (0.88 km^{2}) (0.99 percent) is water.

=== Cities, towns, villages ===
- Deerfield (south edge)
- Glencoe (west edge)
- Glenview (majority)
- Northbrook (vast majority)
- Northfield (west three-quarters)
- Prospect Heights (east edge)
- Wilmette (west edge; Wilmette Golf Club area)
- Des Plaines (north edge; forest preserves)

=== Other Community ===
- Techny at 42.116651°N 87.829635°W

=== Adjacent townships ===
- Moraine Township, Lake County (north)
- West Deerfield Township, Lake County (north)
- New Trier Township (east)
- Niles Township (southeast)
- Maine Township (southwest)
- Wheeling Township (west)
- Vernon Township, Lake County (northwest)

=== Cemeteries ===
The township does not maintain any cemeteries. Northfield Township contains these seven cemeteries: North Northfield (owned and operated by the Village of Northbrook), Northfield Union, Oak Wood, Sacred Heart, Saint Johns, Saint Marys, and Sunset Memorial Lawns.

=== Major highways ===
- Interstate 94
- Interstate 294
- U.S. Route 41
- U.S. Route 45
- Illinois Route 68

=== Airports and landing strips ===
- Northshore Glenbrook Hospital Heliport
- Plaza Heliport

=== Lakes ===
- E J Beck Lake
- Citation Lake
- Lake Glenview
- Lake Shermerville

== Demographics ==
As of the 2020 census there were 91,565 people, 33,505 households, and 23,816 families residing in the township. The population density was 2,643.79 inhabitants per square mile (1,020.77/km^{2}). There were 37,020 housing units at an average density of 1,068.89 per square mile (412.70/km^{2}). The racial makeup of the township was 72.16% White, 1.28% African American, 0.26% Native American, 18.04% Asian, 0.02% Pacific Islander, 2.57% from other races, and 5.68% from two or more races. Hispanic or Latino of any race were 6.41% of the population.

There were 33,505 households, out of which 29.50% had children under the age of 18 living with them, 61.34% were married couples living together, 7.32% had a female householder with no spouse present, and 28.92% were non-families. 26.90% of all households were made up of individuals, and 16.90% had someone living alone who was 65 years of age or older. The average household size was 2.55 and the average family size was 3.11.

The township's age distribution consisted of 23.1% under the age of 18, 5.1% from 18 to 24, 18.6% from 25 to 44, 28.8% from 45 to 64, and 24.4% who were 65 years of age or older. The median age was 47.3 years. For every 100 females, there were 91.4 males. For every 100 females age 18 and over, there were 90.5 males.

The median income for a household in the township was $113,530, and the median income for a family was $154,234. Males had a median income of $90,531 versus $51,911 for females. The per capita income for the township was $67,606. About 3.9% of families and 6.2% of the population were below the poverty line, including 10.3% of those under age 18 and 4.0% of those age 65 or over.

Historical population
Census	Pop.	Note	%±
2000	82,880		—
2010	85,102		2.7%
2020	91,565		7.6%
U.S. Decennial Census

== Economy ==
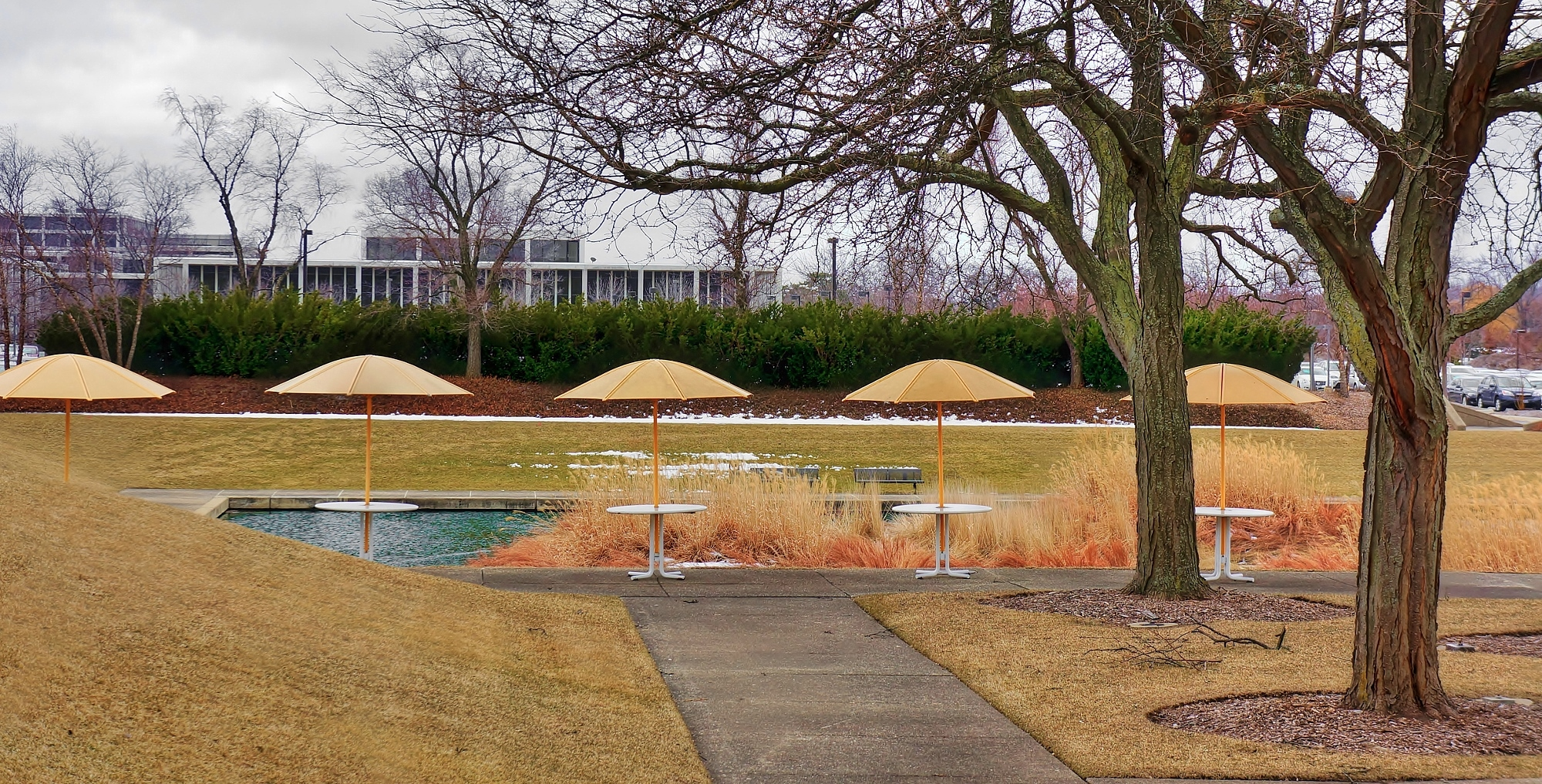
Allstate corporate campus in unincorporated Northfield Township between Glenview and Prospect Heights

Allstate has its headquarters in Northfield Township.

== Political districts ==
- Illinois's 9th congressional district
- Illinois's 10th congressional district
- State House District 17
- State House District 57
- State House District 58
- State Senate District 9
- State Senate District 29
