= Deerfield Township, Michigan =

Deerfield Township may refer to the following places in the U.S. state of Michigan:

- Deerfield Township, Isabella County, Michigan
- Deerfield Township, Lapeer County, Michigan
- Deerfield Township, Lenawee County, Michigan
- Deerfield Township, Livingston County, Michigan
- Deerfield Township, Mecosta County, Michigan

== See also ==
- Deerfield, Michigan, a village in Lenawee County
- Deerfield Township (disambiguation)
