= Old Deerfield =

Old Deerfield may refer to:

- the village of Old Deerfield in Deerfield, Massachusetts
  - specifically the Old Deerfield Historic District in Deerfield, Massachusetts
- the Old Deerfield Center Historic District in New Hampshire
- the unincorporated community of Old Deerfield, Wisconsin
- the Old Deerfield School in Deerfield Beach, Florida
- Deerfield Beach station, a.k.a. the Old Deerfield Beach Seaboard Air Line Railway Station, ibid.

== See also ==
- Deerfield (disambiguation)
