= Deerfield Township, Ohio =

Deerfield Township may refer to the following places in the U.S. state of Ohio:

- Deerfield Township, Hamilton County, Ohio, a former township
- Deerfield Township, Morgan County, Ohio
- Deerfield Township, Portage County, Ohio
- Deerfield Township, Ross County, Ohio
- Deerfield Township, Warren County, Ohio

== See also ==
- Deerfield (disambiguation)
