= Deerfield Township, Minnesota =

Deerfield Township may refer to the following places in the U.S. state of Minnesota:

- Deerfield Township, Cass County, Minnesota
- Deerfield Township, Steele County, Minnesota

== See also ==
- Deerfield Township (disambiguation)
