= Township High School District 113 =

School district in Illinois, USA

Address
- 1040 Park Avenue West Highland Park, Lake County, Illinois, 60035; United States

District information
- Motto: A Passion for Potential
- Grades: 9–12
- Superintendent: Chala Holland
- Schools: 2
- NCES District ID: 1719080

Students and staff
- Students: 3,098 (2024–2025)
- Teachers: 260.78 (on an FTE basis)
- Staff: 390.78 (on an FTE basis)
- Student–teacher ratio: 11.88

Township High School District 113 is a school district in Illinois, with its headquarters in Highland Park. It is made up of two high schools and serves Highland Park, Deerfield, Highwood, Bannockburn, and Riverwoods.

It is governed by a 7-member school board. Dr. Chala Holland currently serves as the district's superintendent.

== Capital Improvements ==
April 2011 Referendum In April 2011, the District 113 school board voted to approve a $133M ballot measure for capital improvements. The plan was defeated with 56.5% of voters voting against the plan.

April 2013 Referendum After the defeat of the initial $133M plan, the District held open recruitment for community members to serve on "study groups" that would assist in evaluating the district's needs, and eventually, how to move forward. This culminated in the development of a Long-Range Master Plan, laying out a blueprint for the next several decades. The study groups were made up of a diverse group of community members from the district's feeder towns, and included both members of CARE for 113 (the "vote yes" committee) and Education 1st (the "vote no" committee). The groups presented their findings at a series of community meetings held in 2012. The ballot measure, a referendum for $89M in funds, was passed on April 9, 2013, election with 52.4% of voters approving.

The total cost of the new project is $114M - $25M will come from the district's existing capital improvements operating budget line item over five years, and the remaining $89M will come from a bond issue.

== Schools ==
- Deerfield High School
- Highland Park High School

== Feeder School Districts ==
- Deerfield School District 109
- North Shore School District 112

== See also ==
- List of school districts in Illinois
