= Danny Cunniff Park =

Coordinates: 42.208°N 87.833°W

Formerly known as Centennial Park, Danny Cunniff Park was renamed, remodeled and dedicated in 1999 after the Park District of Highland Park, Illinois received the largest private donation ever from the family of Danny Cunniff. During Danny's brief but valiant battle with acute myeloid leukemia, which he ultimately succumbed to 37 days after his diagnosis, his parents, Tim Cunniff and Jill Cunniff were deeply touched by the outpouring of love and support they received from the community of Highland Park.

Through the generosity of the Timothy Cunniff family, and a matching State grant, a renovation project was undertaken in 1999 to improve the Park's two existing soccer fields and add two new fields to the complex. In 2002, the park was named the Sports Turf Managers Association Soccer Field of the Year. The park is also home to Centennial Ice Arena.
