= North Chicago station =

Commuter rail station in Illinois, US

North Chicago

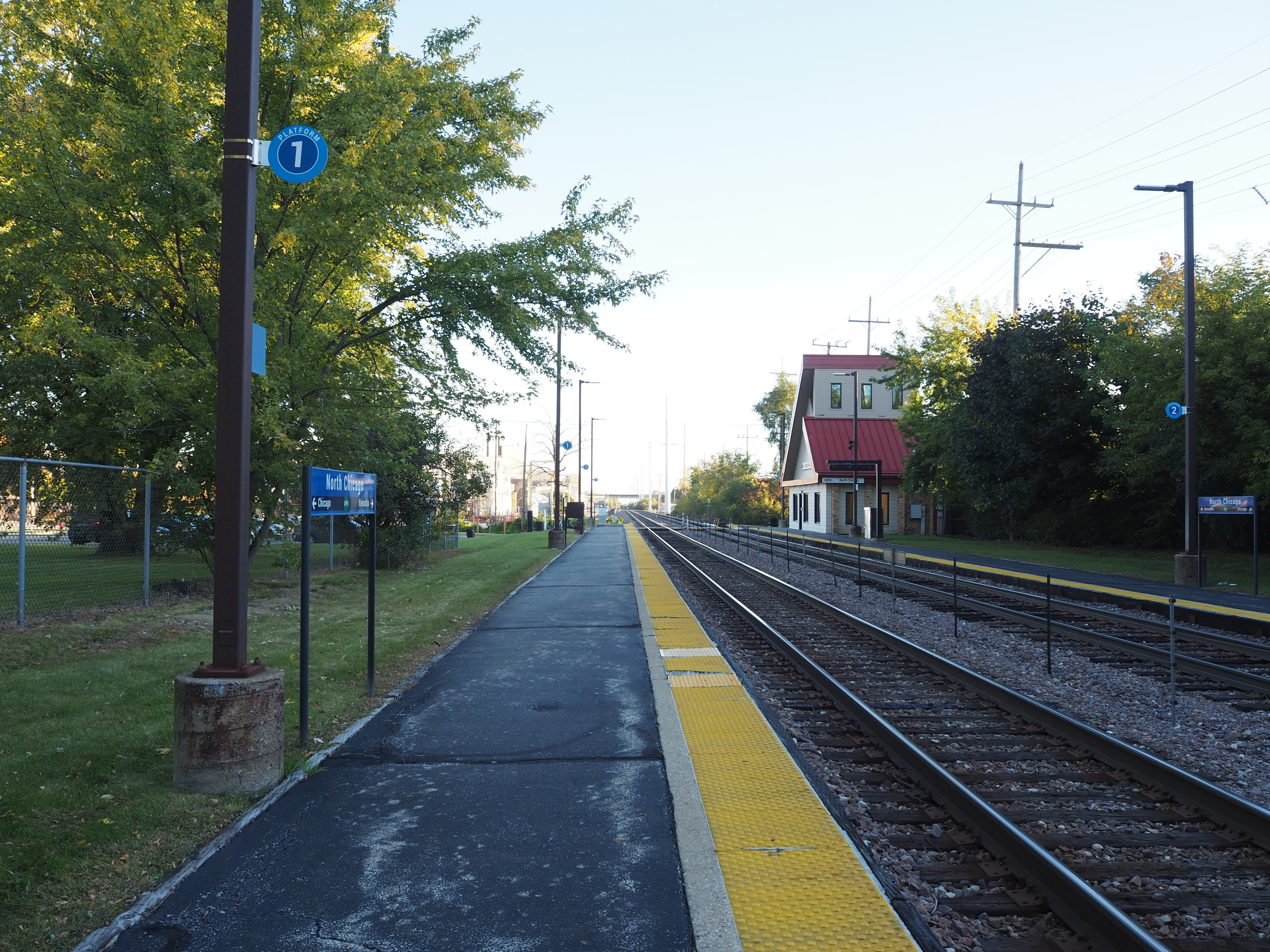
- North Chicago in October 2024

General information
- Location: 1633 Lakeside Avenue; North Chicago, Illinois
- Coordinates: 42.3288°N 87.8370°W
- Owner: Metra
- Platforms: 2 Side platforms
- Tracks: 2 tracks
- Connections: Pace bus

Construction
- Accessible: Yes

Other information
- Fare zone: 4

Passengers
- 2018: 170 (average weekday) 0%
- Rank: 168 out of 236

Services
Preceding station	Metra	Following station
Waukegan toward Kenosha	Union Pacific North	Great Lakes toward Ogilvie TC
Former services
Preceding station	Chicago and North Western Railway	Following station
Waukegan toward Milwaukee	Milwaukee Division	Great Lakes toward Chicago
Track layout
Location

North Chicago is one of two commuter rail stations on Metra's Union Pacific North Line located in North Chicago, Illinois. North Chicago is located at 1633 Lakeside Avenue, 33.7 miles (54.2 km) away from Ogilvie Transportation Center, the southern terminus of the Union Pacific North Line. In Metra's zone-based fare system, North Chicago is located in zone 4. As of 2018, North Chicago is the 168th busiest of Metra's 236 non-downtown stations, with an average of 170 weekday boardings.

Prior to the construction of the current facility, North Chicago was situated 1/2 mile (0.80 km) south of the present location, near Nimitz Avenue. The station consists of two side platforms which serve two tracks. An unstaffed station house is on the inbound (east) platform. Parking is available at North Chicago in a city-owned lot on the west side of the tracks. North Chicago is little more than a shelter, though it is served regularly.

As of September 20, 2025, North Chicago is served by 51 trains (26 inbound, 25 outbound) on weekdays, and by all 30 trains (15 in each direction) on weekends and holidays.

== Bus connections ==
Pace

- "Route 563 – Great Lakes Naval Station". PaceBus.com. Chicago: Pace Suburban Bus Service.
- "Route 564 – Jackson / 14th". PaceBus.com. Chicago: Pace Suburban Bus Service.

== Abbott's Platform ==
Abbott's Platform was a limited-service commuter rail station on Metra's Chicago–Kenosha line in North Chicago. The stop was 0.8 miles (1.3 km) north of the previous North Chicago station—0.3 miles (0.48 km) north of the current station—adjacent to the Abbott Laboratories facility which it served. Unlike other stops, Abbott's Platform was not given its own listing on timetables. Instead, service to this location was indicated by arrival times for North Chicago marked with a "J" note. The stop was closed in 1986.
