= Deerfield, Wisconsin (disambiguation) =

Deerfield, Wisconsin is a village in Dane County.

Deerfield, Wisconsin may also refer to:

- Deerfield (town), Dane County, Wisconsin, a town
- Deerfield, Waushara County, Wisconsin, a town
