= Lake Bluff station =

Commuter rail station in Lake Bluff, Illinois

Lake Bluff

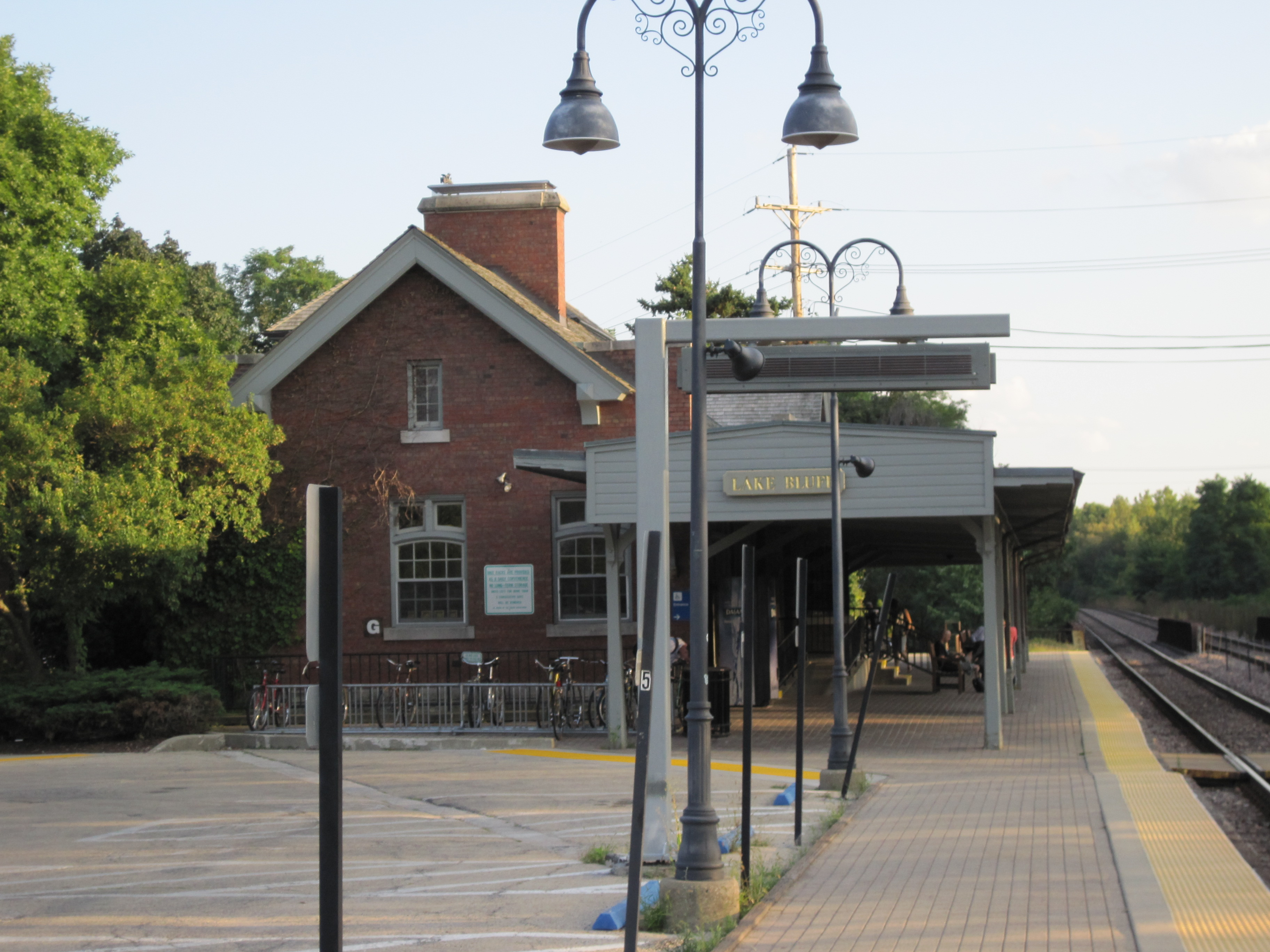
- Lake Bluff station in 2010

General information
- Location: 600 North Sheridan Road; Lake Bluff, Illinois
- Coordinates: 42.2797°N 87.8465°W
- Owner: Metra
- Platforms: 2 side platforms
- Tracks: 2

Construction
- Parking: Yes
- Accessible: Yes

Other information
- Fare zone: 4

History
- Opened: 1904

Passengers
- 2018: 647 (average weekday) ▼5%
- Rank: 80 out of 236

Services
Preceding station	Metra	Following station
Great Lakes toward Kenosha	Union Pacific North	Lake Forest toward Ogilvie TC
Former services
Preceding station	Chicago and North Western Railway	Following station
Great Lakes toward Milwaukee	Milwaukee Division	Lake Forest toward Chicago
Track layout
Location

Lake Bluff is a railroad station in the village of Lake Bluff, Illinois, on Metra's Union Pacific North Line. It is officially located at 600 North Sheridan Road, is 30.2 miles (48.6 km) away from Ogilvie Transportation Center, the inbound terminus of the Union Pacific North Line, and also serves commuters who travel north to Kenosha, Wisconsin. In Metra's zone-based fare system, Lake Bluff is in zone 4. As of 2018, Lake Bluff is the 80th busiest of Metra's 236 non-downtown stations, with an average of 647 weekday boardings.

As of September 20, 2025, Lake Bluff is served by 51 trains (26 inbound, 25 outbound) on weekdays, and by all 30 trains (15 in each direction) on weekends and holidays.

The current station was built in 1904, and previously served the Chicago and North Western Railway before it was bought out by Union Pacific Railroad in 1995. Parking is available in front of the station on North Sheridan Road from the intersection of Scranton Avenue, and on Mawman Avenue off the southeast corner of Rockland Road. It was included in the National Register of Historic Places listing for the Lake Bluff Uptown Commercial Historic District in 2006.

The station was staffed until 2016.

The Union Pacific Lakes Sub parallels the station's trackage and connects with the line north of the station. It follows the line to a curve north of the Waukegan station, where the line ends. Union Pacific has a railyard in Waukegan that services Metra trains as well as their own.
