= Great Lakes station =

Commuter rail station in North Chicago, Illinois

Great Lakes

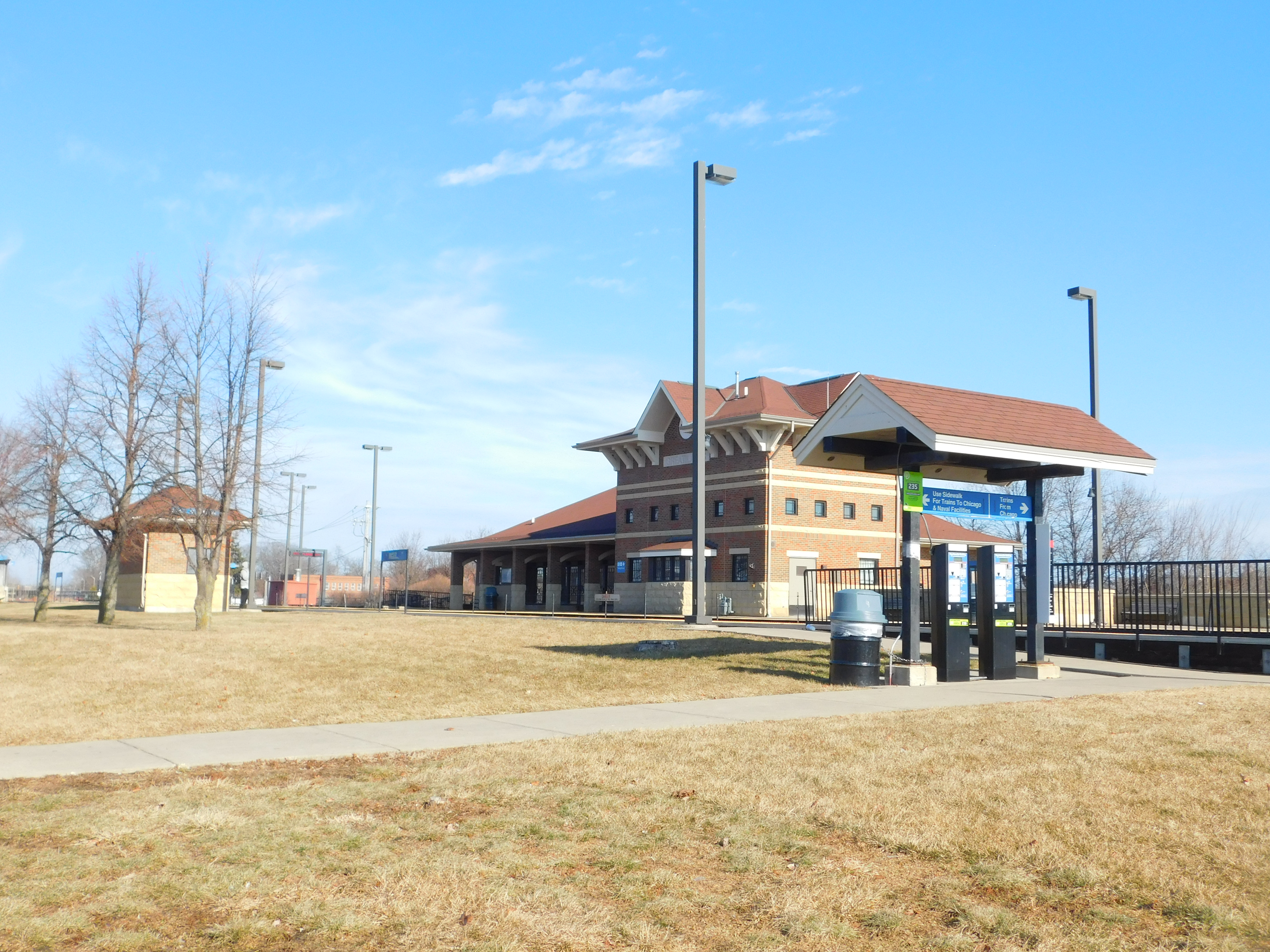
- Great Lakes station in January 2019.

General information
- Location: 3000 South Sheridan Road, North Chicago, Illinois 60088
- Coordinates: 42.3070°N 87.8464°W
- Owner: Metra
- Platforms: 2 side platforms
- Tracks: 2
- Connections: Pace Bus

Construction
- Parking: Yes
- Accessible: Yes

Other information
- Fare zone: 4

History
- Opened: 1919

Passengers
- 2018: 262 (average weekday) ▼10.6%
- Rank: 153 out of 236

Services
Preceding station	Metra	Following station
North Chicago toward Kenosha	Union Pacific North	Lake Bluff toward Ogilvie TC
Former services
Preceding station	Chicago and North Western Railway	Following station
North Chicago toward Milwaukee	Milwaukee Division	Lake Bluff toward Chicago
Track layout
Location

The Great Lakes station is one of two commuter railroad stations in North Chicago, Illinois, served by Metra's Union Pacific North Line. The station (officially located at 3000 South Sheridan Road) is 32.2 miles (51.8 km) away from Ogilvie Transportation Center, the inbound terminus of the Union Pacific North Line, and also serves commuters who travel north to Kenosha, Wisconsin. In Metra's zone-based fare system, Great Lakes is in zone 4. As of 2018, Great Lakes is the 153rd busiest of Metra's 236 non-downtown stations, with an average of 262 weekday boardings.

It is named for the Great Lakes Naval Training Base in the City of North Chicago.

As of September 20, 2025, Great Lakes is served by 51 trains (26 inbound, 25 outbound) on weekdays, and by all 30 trains (15 in each direction) on weekends and holidays.

Like North Chicago station, Great Lakes serves as a stop for Naval Station Great Lakes. However, unlike North Chicago station, the Naval training center surrounds much of Great Lakes station, which is also located near the Shore Acres Country Club.

The connection to the Pace bus system has a boarding location near the main entrance to the naval station, it is also a location for taxi pick ups, and drop offs. Parking is available at the end of Ohio Avenue which leads from the southern terminus of the Bobby E. Thompson Expressway.

== Bus connections ==
Pace

- 563 Great Lakes Naval Station
