= Lowell B. Komie =

American novelist

Lowell Burt Komie (29 December 1927 – 29 October 2015) was an American lawyer and writer.

Born in Chicago, Komie grew up in Milwaukee before moving to Ravinia, later graduating from Highland Park High School in 1945. Komie became famous for his legal fiction works. In 1995 he received the Carl Sandburg Literary Award and the Small Press Award for Fiction in 1998. Komie died on 29 October 2015 in Highwood, Illinois, where he lived.

== Selected works ==
- The Lawyers Chambers and other stories (1995, short story collection)
- The Last Jewish Shortstop in America (1998, novel)
