= North Shore School District 112 =

School district in Highland Park, Illinois, USA

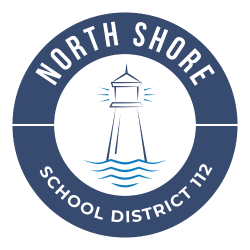

Address
- 445 Sheridan Road Highwood, Illinois, 60040; United States

District information
- Type: Public
- Grades: PreK–8
- Superintendent: Monica Schroeder
- NCES District ID: 1700119

Students and staff
- Students: 3,785 (2022–2023)
- Teachers: 331.86 (on an FTE basis)
- Student–teacher ratio: 11.41

Other information
- Website: www.nssd112.org

North Shore School District 112 is an elementary school district in Highland Park and Highwood, Illinois, in the Chicago metropolitan area. The district serves approximately 3,800 students, from Pre-K through 8th grade, in nine schools.

== Schools ==
North Shore School District 112 operates seven elementary schools and two middle schools: The district's Dual Language program is hosted at Oak Terrace and Red Oak. Oak Terrace is also the home for the district's pre-kindergarten program.

=== Elementary schools ===
- Braeside Elementary School: Kindergarten through 5th
- Indian Trail Elementary School: Kindergarten through 5th
- Oak Terrace Elementary School: Pre-K through 5th
- Ravinia Elementary School: Kindergarten through 5th
- Red Oak Elementary School: 1st through 5th
- Sherwood Elementary School: Kindergarten through 5th
- Wayne Thomas Elementary School: Kindergarten through 5th

=== Middle Schools ===
- Edgewood Middle School: 6th through 8th
- Northwood Middle School: 6th through 8th

== Board of education ==
- Art Kessler, President
- Melissa Itkin, Vice President
- Jenny Butler, Secretary
- Lori Fink
- Jaret Fishman
- Lisa Hirsh
- Bennett Lasko
