= Lake Forest station (Union Pacific) =

Commuter rail station in Lake Forest, Illinois

Lake Forest

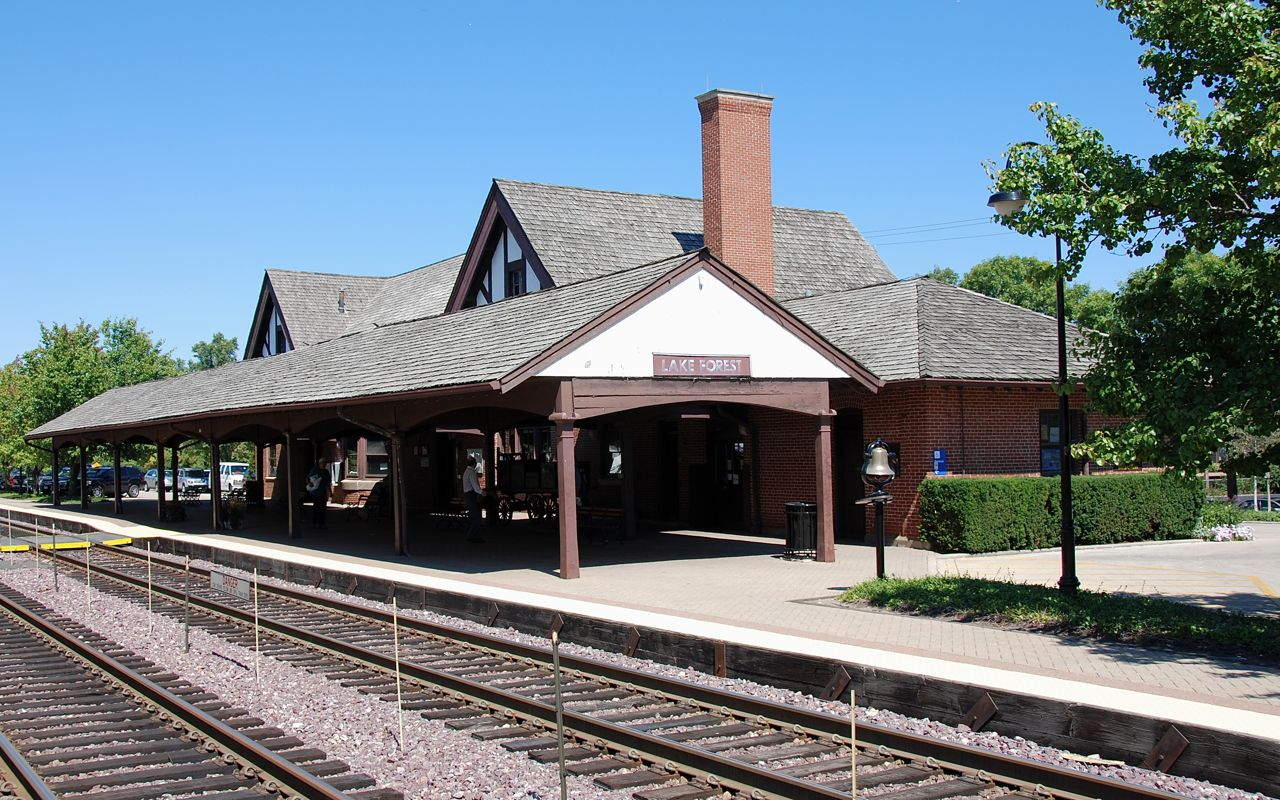

General information
- Location: 691 North Western Avenue; Lake Forest, Illinois
- Coordinates: 42.2525°N 87.8396°W
- Owner: City of Lake Forest
- Platforms: 2 Side platforms
- Tracks: 2
- Connections: Pace Bus; Green Bay Bike Trail

Construction
- Parking: Yes
- Accessible: Yes

Other information
- Fare zone: 4

History
- Opened: 1900

Passengers
- 2018: 747 (average weekday) ▲4.2%
- Rank: 70 out of 236

Services
Preceding station	Metra	Following station
Lake Bluff toward Kenosha	Union Pacific North	Fort Sheridan toward Ogilvie TC
Former services
Preceding station	Chicago and North Western Railway	Following station
Waukegan toward Minneapolis	Chicago – Minneapolis via Milwaukee	Highland Park toward Chicago
Lake Bluff toward Milwaukee	Milwaukee Division	Fort Sheridan toward Chicago
Track layout
Location

Lake Forest is a railroad station in Lake Forest, Illinois, served by Metra's Union Pacific North Line. The station, located at 691 North Western Avenue, is 28.3 miles (45.5 km) away from Ogilvie Transportation Center, the inbound terminus of the Union Pacific North Line, and also serves commuters who travel north to Kenosha, Wisconsin. In Metra's zone-based fare system, Lake Forest is in zone 4. As of 2018, Lake Forest is the 70th busiest of Metra's 236 non-downtown stations, with an average of 747 weekday boardings. Lake Forest station is located in downtown Lake Forest and is in close proximity to the Lake Forest Library. The station has a ticket office which is open during the morning rush hour, Monday through Friday.

As of September 20, 2025, Lake Forest is served by 51 trains (26 inbound, 25 outbound) on weekdays, and by all 30 trains (15 in each direction) on weekends and holidays.

This station is sometimes referred to as East Lake Forest, to avoid confusion with the Lake Forest station on the Milwaukee District North Line.

Parking is available along the east side of the tracks along McKinley Road between Woodland Road and north of Illinois Road, along the east side of the tracks along Western Avenue between Illinois Road and Vine Avenue, and at numerous lots near the station. As with many suburban Metra stations, Pace buses serve commuters at the station. No connection between this station and the Lake Forest station on the Milwaukee District North Line is available, however.

The current building was built in 1900 by the Chicago and North Western Railway to a design by architects Frost & Granger.
