= Deerfield Township, Pennsylvania =

Deerfield Township may refer to:

- Deerfield Township, Tioga County, Pennsylvania
- Deerfield Township, Warren County, Pennsylvania
