= Deerfield, Ohio =

Deerfield, Ohio could refer to the following places:

- Deerfield Township, Morgan County, Ohio
- Deerfield Township, Portage County, Ohio
- Deerfield Township, Ross County, Ohio
- Deerfield Township, Warren County, Ohio
- South Lebanon, Ohio, a village originally known as Deerfield
