= John Griffith Store Building =

- U.S. National Register of Historic Places
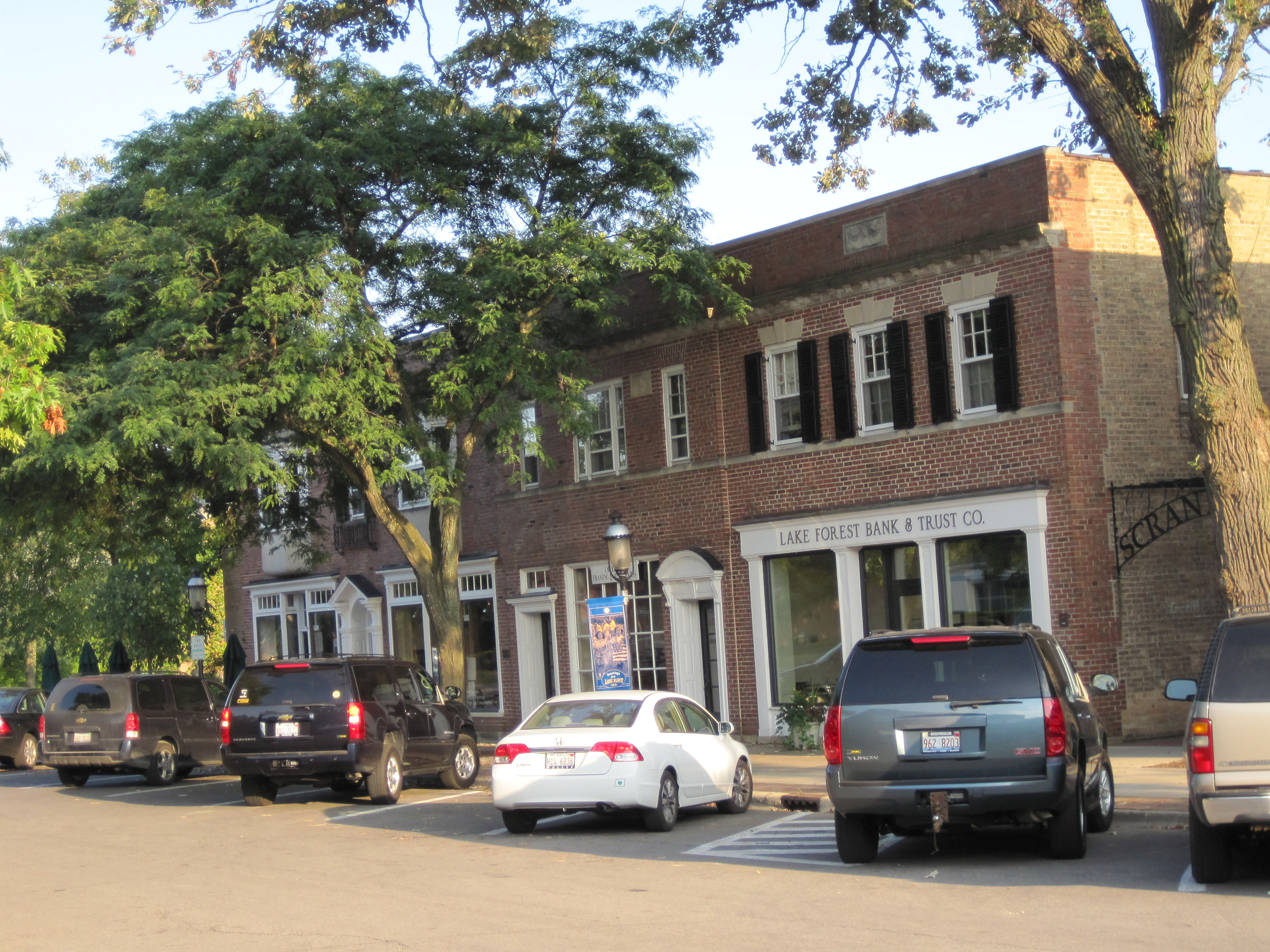

- Location within Chicago metropolitan area Location within Illinois Location within the United States
- Location: 103-113 E. Scranton Ave., Lake Bluff, Illinois
- Coordinates: 42°16′53″N 87°50′37″W
- Area: less than one acre
- Built: 1925-26
- Architect: Stanley Anderson
- Architectural style: Colonial Revival
- NRHP reference No.: 02001755
- Added to NRHP: February 5, 2003

The John Griffith Store Building is an American historic commercial building at 103–113 E. Scranton Avenue in Lake Bluff, Illinois. Built in 1925–26 by businessman John Griffith, the building originally housed four storefronts and several second-floor apartments. Architect Stanley Anderson of the firm Anderson, Ticknor & Fox, who designed several of neighboring Lake Forest's major institutional buildings and many of its homes, designed the store in the Colonial Revival style. The store's size and brick construction allowed it to stand out from Lake Bluff's other commercial buildings, most of which were smaller wooden structures; the use of the then-popular Colonial Revival style further distinguished it from its older and more modest neighbors. The building's design includes wooden decorations and trim around the first-floor doors and windows, two oriel windows on the second floor, stone lintels atop the second floor's remaining windows, a stone cornice, and a brick parapet.

The building was added to the National Register of Historic Places on February 5, 2003.
