= Highwood station =

Commuter rail station in Highwood, Illinois

Highwood

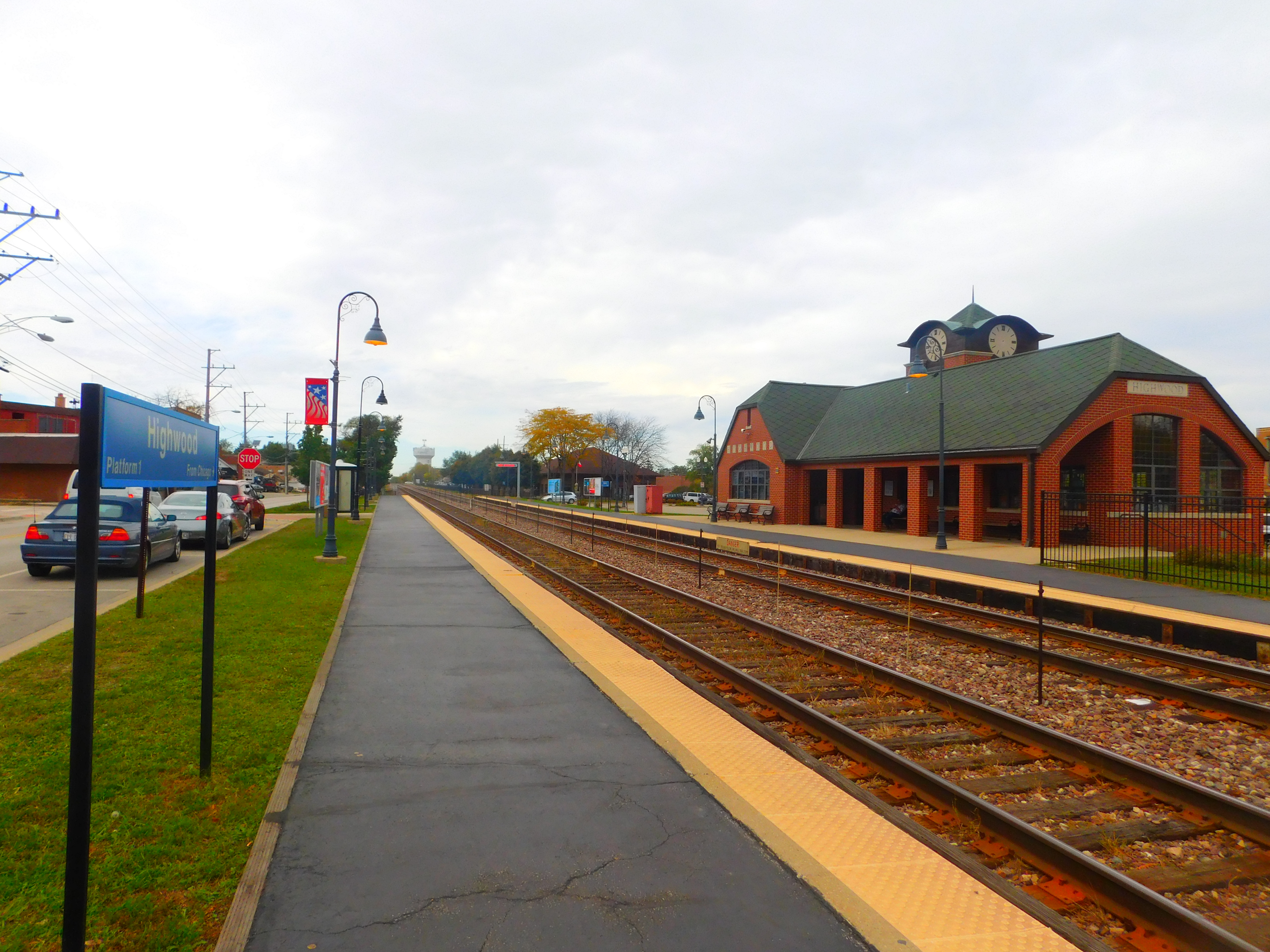
- Highwood station in October 2015

General information
- Location: 317 Green Bay Road; Highwood, Illinois
- Coordinates: 42.2034°N 87.8105°W
- Owner: Metra
- Platforms: 2 Side platforms
- Tracks: 2 tracks
- Connections: Pace Buses

Construction
- Accessible: Yes

Other information
- Fare zone: 4

History
- Opened: 1962

Passengers
- 2018: 242 (average weekday) ▼17.4%
- Rank: 159 out of 236

Services
Preceding station	Metra	Following station
Fort Sheridan toward Kenosha	Union Pacific North	Highland Park toward Ogilvie TC
Former services
Preceding station	Chicago and North Western Railway	Following station
Fort Sheridan toward Milwaukee	Milwaukee Division	Highland Park toward Chicago
Track layout
Location

Highwood is one of two stations on Metra's Union Pacific North Line located in Highwood, Illinois. Highwood is located at 317 Green Bay Road. Highwood is 24.5 miles (39.4 km) away from Ogilvie Transportation Center, the southern terminus of the Union Pacific North Line. In Metra's zone-based fare system, Highwood is located in zone 4. As of 2018, Highwood is the 159th busiest of Metra's 236 non-downtown stations, with an average of 242 weekday boardings.

Highwood station is located at grade level and has two side platforms which serve two tracks. An unstaffed station house which is open from 5:30 A.M. to 6:00 P.M. is located on the inbound (east) platform. A parking lot managed by the city is available for commuters at Highwood.

As of September 20, 2025, Highwood is served by 51 trains (26 inbound, 25 outbound) on weekdays, and by all 30 trains (15 in each direction) on weekends and holidays.

== Bus connections ==
Pace

- "Route 472 – Highland Park - Highwood". PaceBus.com. Chicago: Pace Suburban Bus Service.
