= Deerfield, Waushara County, Wisconsin =

Deerfield, Wisconsin
- Town
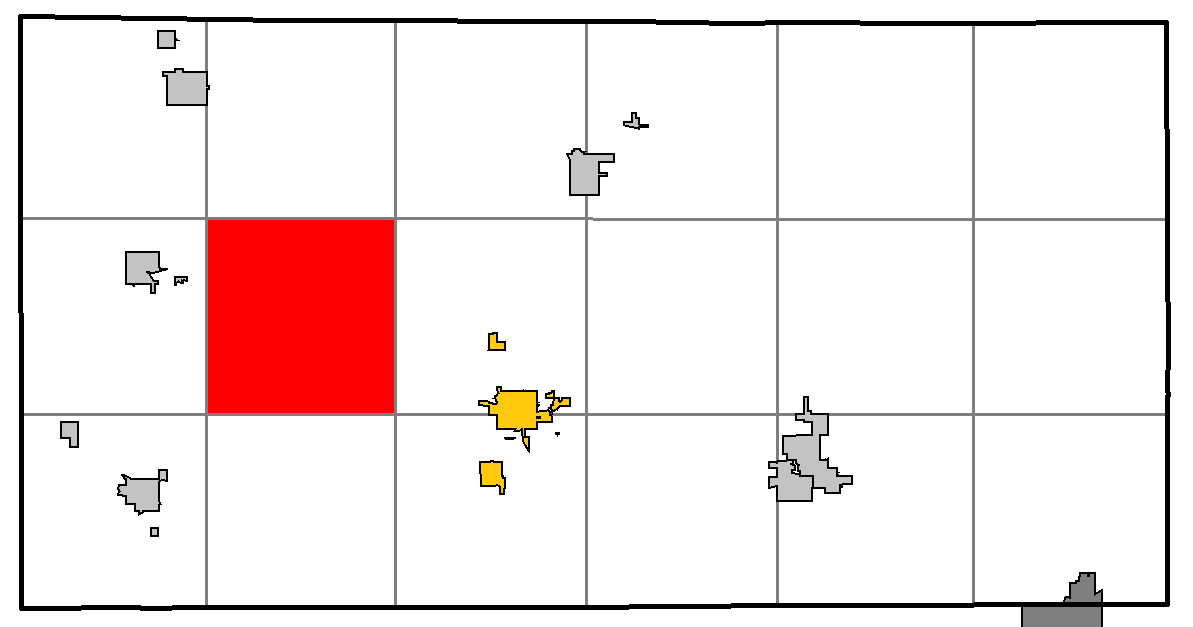
- Location of Deerfield, Waushara County, Wisconsin

- Location of Waushara County, Wisconsin
- Coordinates: 44°6′48″N 89°25′1″W
- Country: United States
- State: Wisconsin
- County: Waushara

Area
  - Total: 35.0 sq mi (90.7 km^{2})
  - Land: 34.7 sq mi (89.8 km^{2})
  - Water: 0.35 sq mi (0.9 km^{2})
- Elevation: 1,132 ft (345 m)

Population (2020)
  - Total: 667
  - Density: 19.2/sq mi (7.43/km^{2})
- Time zone: UTC-6 (Central (CST))
  - Summer (DST): UTC-5 (CDT)
- FIPS code: 55-19300
- GNIS feature ID: 1583062
- Website: http://www.deerfieldwaushara.com/

Deerfield is a town in Waushara County, Wisconsin, United States. The population was 667 at the 2020 census.

== Geography ==
According to the United States Census Bureau, the town has a total area of 35.0 square miles (90.7 km^{2}), of which 34.7 square miles (89.8 km^{2}) is land and 0.3 square mile (0.9 km^{2}) (0.97%) is water.

== Demographics ==
As of the census of 2000, there were 629 people, 263 households, and 204 families residing in the town. The population density was 18.1 people per square mile (7.0/km^{2}). There were 487 housing units at an average density of 14.0 per square mile (5.4/km^{2}). The racial makeup of the town was 97.46% White, 0.32% African American, 0.32% Native American, 0.16% Asian, 0.32% from other races, and 1.43% from two or more races. Hispanic or Latino of any race were 1.11% of the population.

There were 263 households, out of which 25.1% had children under the age of 18 living with them, 67.7% were married couples living together, 6.5% had a female householder with no husband present, and 22.4% were non-families. 18.3% of all households were made up of individuals, and 9.1% had someone living alone who was 65 years of age or older. The average household size was 2.39 and the average family size was 2.68.

In the town, the population was spread out, with 21.8% under the age of 18, 2.5% from 18 to 24, 26.7% from 25 to 44, 30.0% from 45 to 64, and 18.9% who were 65 years of age or older. The median age was 44 years. For every 100 females, there were 102.9 males. For every 100 females age 18 and over, there were 99.2 males.

The median income for a household in the town was $41,324, and the median income for a family was $44,318. Males had a median income of $29,643 versus $21,850 for females. The per capita income for the town was $20,781. About 6.5% of families and 7.0% of the population were below the poverty line, including 2.1% of those under age 18 and 6.0% of those age 65 or over.
