= Deerfield School =

Deerfield School may refer to:

- Deerfield Beach Elementary School in Deerfield Beach, Florida, listed on the National Register of Historic Places in Broward County, Florida
- Old Deerfield School in Deerfield Beach, Florida, listed on the National Register of Historic Places in Broward County, Florida
- Deerfield School (Deerfield, Virginia), listed on the National Register of Historic Places in Augusta County, Virginia
- Deerfield Academy a coeducational boarding school in Deerfield, Massachusetts
