= Deerfield High School =

Deerfield High School may refer to:

- Deerfield Academy in Deerfield, Massachusetts
- Deerfield High School (Illinois) in Deerfield, Illinois
- Deerfield High School (Wisconsin) in Deerfield, Wisconsin
- Deerfield-Windsor School in Albany, Georgia
