= Deerfield, Lexington =

Neighborhood in Lexington, Kentucky

Coordinates: 38.004°N 84.525°W

Deerfield is a neighborhood in southwestern Lexington, Kentucky, United States. Its boundaries are Nicholasville Road to the east, Cincinnati Southern Railroad tracks to the west, Pasadena Drive to the north, and New Circle Road to the south.

Neighborhood statistics

- Area: 0.499 square miles (1.29 km^{2})
- Population: 837
- Population density: 1,679 people per square mile
- Median household income: $54,581
