= Deerfield, Nova Scotia =

Community in Nova Scotia, Canada

Coordinates: 43°57′12.52″N 65°59′40.15″W

Deerfield in Nova Scotia

Deerfield is a community in the Canadian province of Nova Scotia, located in Yarmouth County.

Deerfield was settled in the 19th century, and had a sawmill and a schoolhouse by 1842. The name "Deerfield" likely refers to an abundance of deer in the area.
