= Moraine Township, Illinois =

Moraine Township
- Township
- Seal

- Location in Lake County

- Lake County's location in Illinois
- Coordinates: 42.18338°N 87.80456°W
- Country: United States
- State: Illinois
- County: Lake

Government
  - Supervisor: Anne Flanigan Bassi

Area
  - Total: 11.98 sq mi (31.0 km^{2})
  - Land: 11.95 sq mi (31.0 km^{2})
  - Water: 0.03 sq mi (0.078 km^{2}) 0.28%
- Elevation: 646 ft (197 m)

Population (2020)
  - Total: 33,946
  - Density: 2,841/sq mi (1,097/km^{2})
- Time zone: UTC-6 (CST)
  - Summer (DST): UTC-5 (CDT)
- FIPS code: 17-097-50364
- Website: www.morainetownship.org

Moraine Township is a township in Lake County, Illinois, USA. As of the 2020 census, its population was 33,946. Moraine Township was originally called Deerfield Township, but the name was changed on October 29, 1998.

== Geography ==
According to the 2021 census gazetteer files, Moraine Township has a total area of 11.98 square miles (31.03 km^{2}), of which 11.95 square miles (30.95 km^{2}) (or 99.72%) is land and 0.03 square miles (0.08 km^{2}) (or 0.28%) is water.

=== Cities and towns ===
- Deerfield (east edge)
- Highland Park (northeast three-quarters)
- Highwood
- Lake Forest (southeast edge)

=== Adjacent townships ===
- New Trier Township, Cook County (southeast)
- Northfield Township, Cook County (south)
- West Deerfield Township (west)
- Shields Township (northwest)

=== Cemeteries ===
The township contains four cemeteries: Daggitt, Fort Sheridan, Mooney, and Saint Marys.

=== Major highways ===
- U.S. Route 41

=== Airports and landing strips ===
- Gieser Heliport

== Demographics ==
As of the 2020 census there were 33,946 people, 13,203 households, and 9,504 families residing in the township. The population density was 2,834.03 inhabitants per square mile (1,094.23/km^{2}). There were 13,857 housing units at an average density of 1,156.87 per square mile (446.67/km^{2}). The racial makeup of the township was 78.26% White, 1.65% African American, 0.84% Native American, 3.34% Asian, 0.02% Pacific Islander, 7.09% from other races, and 8.80% from two or more races. Hispanic or Latino of any race were 15.27% of the population.

There were 13,203 households, out of which 33.80% had children under the age of 18 living with them, 63.89% were married couples living together, 4.91% had a female householder with no spouse present, and 28.02% were non-families. 24.50% of all households were made up of individuals, and 14.70% had someone living alone who was 65 years of age or older. The average household size was 2.53 and the average family size was 3.04.

The township's age distribution consisted of 25.2% under the age of 18, 5.0% from 18 to 24, 20.1% from 25 to 44, 27.8% from 45 to 64, and 21.9% who were 65 years of age or older. The median age was 44.7 years. For every 100 females, there were 93.5 males. For every 100 females age 18 and over, there were 89.6 males.

The median income for a household in the township was $135,883, and the median income for a family was $179,754. Males had a median income of $102,789 versus $46,160 for females. The per capita income for the township was $82,973. About 4.7% of families and 6.3% of the population were below the poverty line, including 7.1% of those under age 18 and 4.7% of those age 65 or over.

Historical population
Census	Pop.	Note	%±
2010	34,129		—
2020	33,946		−0.5%
U.S. Decennial Census
