= Fort Sheridan station =

Commuter rail station in Highwood, Illinois

Fort Sheridan

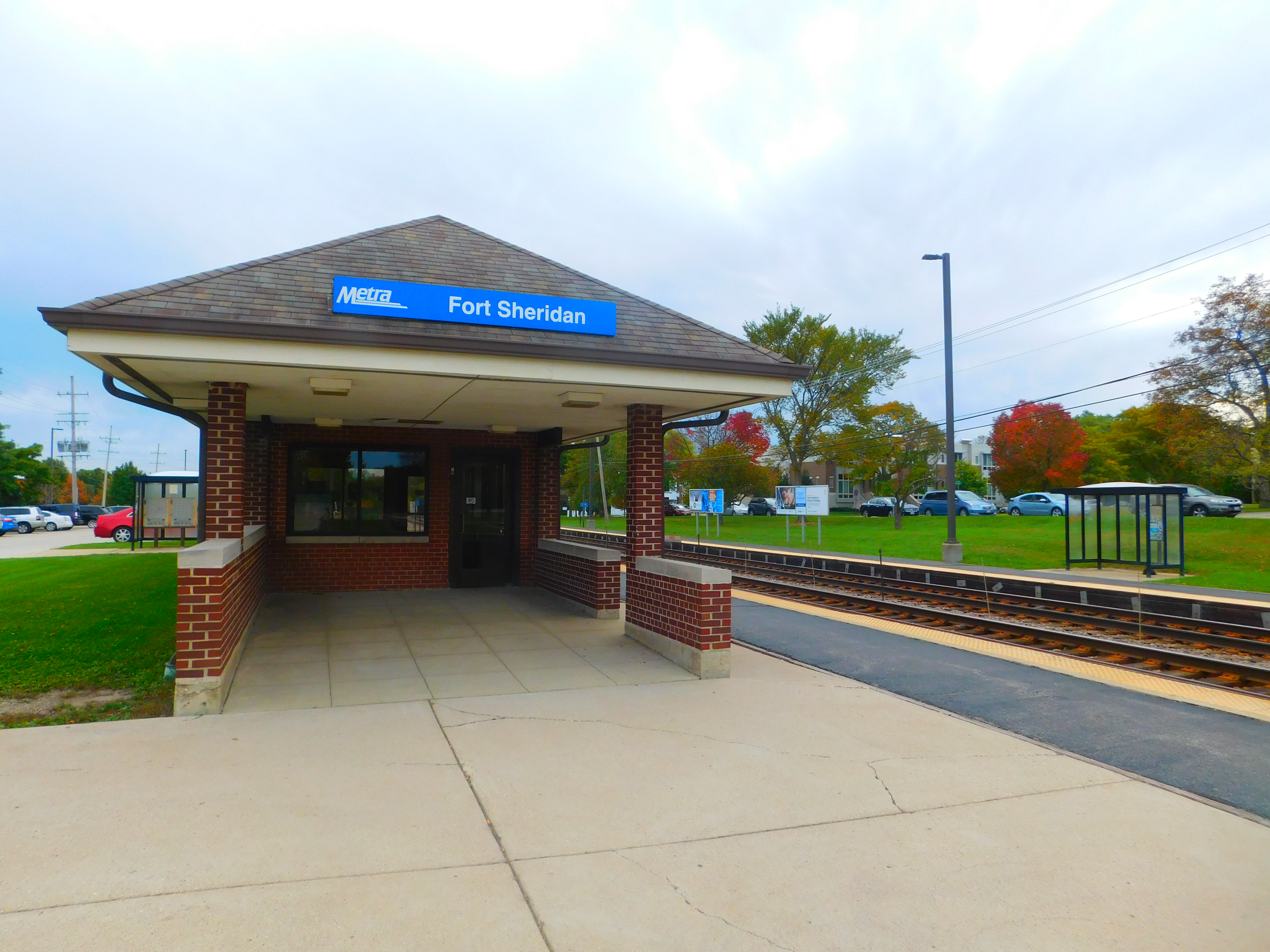
- Fort Sheridan station in October 2015.

General information
- Location: 461 West Old Elm Road; Fort Sheridan, Illinois
- Coordinates: 42.2174°N 87.8210°W
- Owner: Metra
- Platforms: 2 Side platforms
- Tracks: 2 tracks
- Connections: Pace Buses

Construction
- Parking: Yes
- Accessible: Yes

Other information
- Fare zone: 4

Passengers
- 2018: 259 (average weekday) ▼5.5%
- Rank: 156 out of 236

Services
Preceding station	Metra	Following station
Lake Forest toward Kenosha	Union Pacific North	Highwood toward Ogilvie TC
Former services
Preceding station	Chicago and North Western Railway	Following station
Lake Forest toward Milwaukee	Milwaukee Division	Highwood toward Chicago
Track layout
Location

Fort Sheridan station is one of two stations on Metra's Union Pacific North Line located in the Fort Sheridan neighborhood in Highwood, Illinois. The station is officially located at 461 West Old Elm Road, and is 25.7 miles (41.4 km) away from Ogilvie Transportation Center, the southern terminus of the Union Pacific North Line. In Metra's zone-based fare system, Fort Sheridan is located in zone 4. As of 2018, Fort Sheridan is the 156th busiest of Metra's 236 non-downtown stations, with an average of 259 weekday boardings.

As of September 20, 2025, Fort Sheridan is served by 51 trains (26 inbound, 25 outbound) on weekdays, and by all 30 trains (15 in each direction) on weekends and holidays.

Parking at Fort Sheridan station is maintained by the City of Highwood, and is available on both sides of the tracks. Street-side parking is available on the west side of the tracks along Western Avenue and Hyacinth Place south of West Old Elm Road, and on the east side of the tracks near both corners of West Old Elm and Sheridan roads.

== Bus connections ==
Pace

- 472 Highland Park/Highwood (Monday-Saturday only)
