= Deerfield Township, Livingston County, Michigan =

Deerfield Township, Michigan
- Civil township
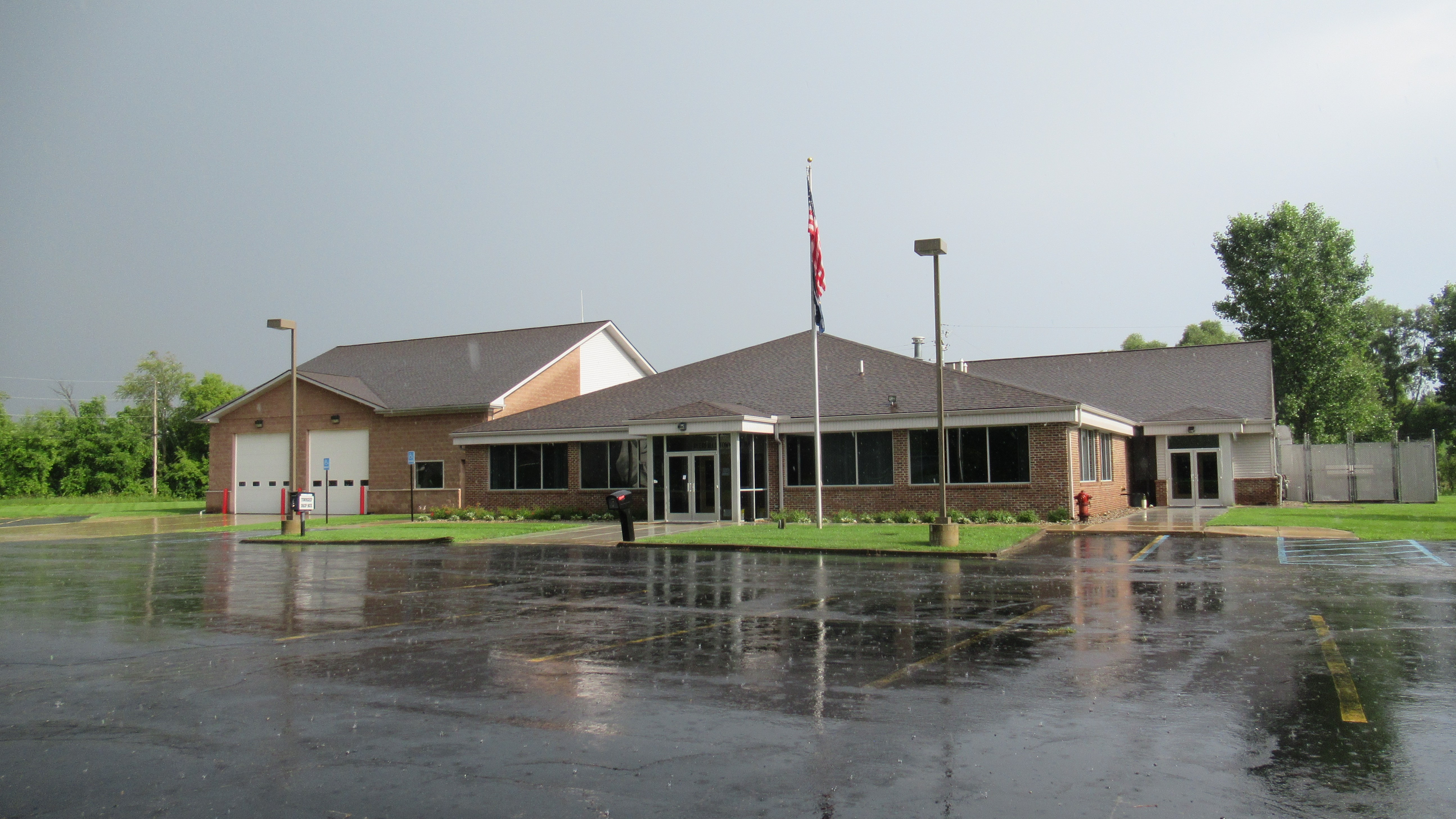
- Deerfield Township Hall and Fire Department

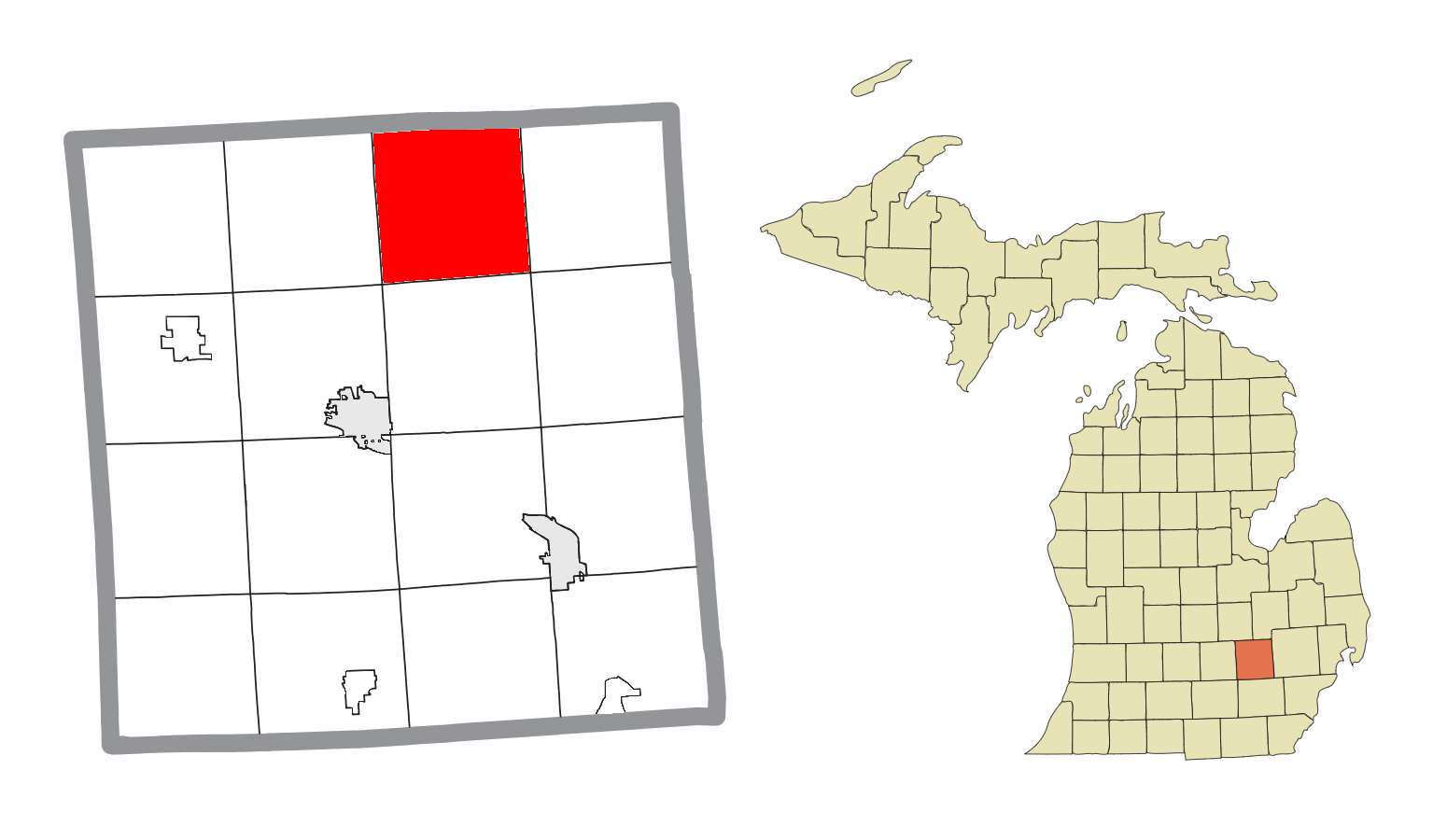
- Location within Livingston County

- Location in Michigan Location in the United States
- Coordinates: 42°44′59″N 83°51′20″W
- Country: United States
- State: Michigan
- County: Livingston

Government
  - Supervisor: Alfred Mattioli
  - Clerk: Gary Johnston

Area
  - Total: 37.6 sq mi (97.5 km^{2})
  - Land: 36.2 sq mi (93.7 km^{2})
  - Water: 1.5 sq mi (3.8 km^{2})
- Elevation: 902 ft (275 m)

Population (2020)
  - Total: 4,166
  - Density: 115/sq mi (44.5/km^{2})
- Time zone: UTC-5 (Eastern (EST))
  - Summer (DST): UTC-4 (EDT)
- ZIP code(s): 48430 (Fenton); 48451 (Linden); 48855 (Howell)
- Area code: 517
- FIPS code: 26-21220
- GNIS feature ID: 1626171
- Website: www.deerfieldtwp.org

Deerfield Township is a civil township of Livingston County in the U.S. state of Michigan. The population was 4,166 at the 2020 census.

== Communities ==
- Deer Creek is an unincorporated community on Wiggins Road south of Cohoctah Road at 42°45′36″N 84°54′26″W.
- Deerfield Center is an unincorporated community on Center and Mack roads 42°44′01″N 84°51′44″W.

== Geography ==
Deerfield Township is in the northeast part of Livingston County and is bordered to the north by Genesee County. According to the United States Census Bureau, the township has a total area of 37.6 square miles (97.5 km^{2}), of which 36.2 square miles (93.7 km^{2}) are land and 1.5 square miles (3.8 km^{2}), or 3.90%, are water. The township is drained by north-flowing tributaries of the Shiawassee River.

== Demographics ==
As of the census of 2000, there were 4,087 people, 1,386 households, and 1,118 families residing in the township. The population density was 112.2 inhabitants per square mile (43.3/km^{2}). There were 1,495 housing units at an average density of 41.1 per square mile (15.9/km^{2}). The racial makeup of the township was 98.29% White, 0.51% Native American, 0.12% Asian, 0.10% from other races, and 0.98% from two or more races. Hispanic or Latino of any race were 1.25% of the population.

There were 1,386 households, out of which 41.0% had children under the age of 18 living with them, 71.9% were married couples living together, 5.6% had a female householder with no husband present, and 19.3% were non-families. 15.1% of all households were made up of individuals, and 3.7% had someone living alone who was 65 years of age or older. The average household size was 2.95 and the average family size was 3.30.

In the township the population was spread out, with 29.9% under the age of 18, 6.3% from 18 to 24, 32.1% from 25 to 44, 25.2% from 45 to 64, and 6.5% who were 65 years of age or older. The median age was 36 years. For every 100 females, there were 107.5 males. For every 100 females age 18 and over, there were 108.7 males.

The median income for a household in the township was $65,756, and the median income for a family was $69,750. Males had a median income of $47,202 versus $34,028 for females. The per capita income for the township was $28,140. About 1.3% of families and 2.4% of the population were below the poverty line, including 3.3% of those under age 18 and 4.1% of those age 65 or over.
