= Deerfield Township, Fulton County, Illinois =

Deerfield Township
- Township
- Location in Fulton County

- Fulton County's location in Illinois
- Coordinates: 40°34′38″N 90°15′32″W
- Country: United States
- State: Illinois
- County: Fulton
- Established: November 6, 1849

Area
  - Total: 34.33 sq mi (88.9 km^{2})
  - Land: 34.17 sq mi (88.5 km^{2})
  - Water: 0.16 sq mi (0.41 km^{2}) 0.46%
- Elevation: 640 ft (195 m)

Population (2020)
  - Total: 232
  - Density: 6.79/sq mi (2.62/km^{2})
- Time zone: UTC-6 (CST)
  - Summer (DST): UTC-5 (CDT)
- ZIP codes: 61415, 61427, 61431, 61432, 61477, 61520
- FIPS code: 17-057-18979

Deerfield Township is one of twenty-six townships in Fulton County, Illinois, USA. As of the 2020 census, its population was 232 and it contained 129 housing units.

== Geography ==
According to the 2021 census gazetteer files, Deerfield Township has a total area of 34.33 square miles (88.91 km^{2}), of which 34.17 square miles (88.50 km^{2}) (or 99.54%) is land and 0.16 square miles (0.41 km^{2}) (or 0.46%) is water.

=== Extinct towns ===
- Blyton
- Midway is a small settlement south of Wiley church.
- Wiley was a town Emsley Wiley set a side 1-acre (4,000 m^{2}) for a school & meeting house. He platted a city to be named Wiley but it did not materialize. His dream of a school & meeting house did and in 1839 the first rude log school was built. In 1844 Mr. & Mrs. Wiley sold their land & moved farther west, In 1880 the Wiley Lutheran Church was organized & still exists today along with the cemetery.
- Westminster was a paper town founded by David Everly after they moved here coming from the east. Only 3 lots were sold but the village never materialized and so ceased to exist.

=== Cemeteries ===
The township contains these four cemeteries: Dickson, Wiley, Lamb & Roberts.

=== Major highways ===
- Illinois Route 9

== Demographics ==
As of the 2020 census there were 232 people, 77 households, and 67 families residing in the township. The population density was 6.76 inhabitants per square mile (2.61/km^{2}). There were 129 housing units at an average density of 3.76 per square mile (1.45/km^{2}). The racial makeup of the township was 98.28% White, 0.43% African American, 0.00% Native American, 0.00% Asian, 0.00% Pacific Islander, 0.00% from other races, and 1.29% from two or more races. Hispanic or Latino of any race were 0.00% of the population.

There were 77 households, out of which 6.50% had children under the age of 18 living with them, 87.01% were married couples living together, 0.00% had a female householder with no spouse present, and 12.99% were non-families. 13.00% of all households were made up of individuals, and 6.50% had someone living alone who was 65 years of age or older. The average household size was 1.86 and the average family size was 1.99.

The township's age distribution consisted of 6.3% under the age of 18, 0.0% from 18 to 24, 4.9% from 25 to 44, 42% from 45 to 64, and 46.9% who were 65 years of age or older. The median age was 63.0 years. For every 100 females, there were 98.6 males. For every 100 females age 18 and over, there were 86.1 males.

The median income for a household in the township was $64,205. Males had a median income of $52,813 versus $28,516 for females. The per capita income for the township was $34,597. About 6.0% of families and 9.8% of the population were below the poverty line, including none of those under age 18 and 7.5% of those age 65 or over.

Historical population
Census	Pop.	Note	%±
2000	256		—
2010	261		2.0%
2020	232		−11.1%
U.S. Decennial Census

== School districts ==
- Bushnell Prairie City Community Unit School District 170
- Community Unit School District 3 Fulton City
- Spoon River Valley Community Unit School District 4

== Political districts ==
- Illinois' 17th congressional district
- State House District 94
- State Senate District 47
