= West Deerfield Township, Illinois =

Coordinates: 42°11′43″N 87°51′34″W

West Deerfield Township
- Township
- Location in Lake County
- Country: United States
- State: Illinois
- County: Lake
- Established: 1888

Government
  - Supervisor: Alyson Miller Feiger

Area
  - Total: 17.90 sq mi (46.4 km^{2})
  - Land: 17.79 sq mi (46.1 km^{2})
  - Water: 0.11 sq mi (0.28 km^{2}) 0.60%

Population (2020)
  - Total: 31,586
  - Density: 1,775/sq mi (685.5/km^{2})
- Time zone: UTC-6 (CST)
  - Summer (DST): UTC-5 (CDT)
- Website: westdeerfieldtownship.org

West Deerfield Township is located in Lake County, Illinois. The population was 31,586 at the 2020 census. West Deerfield Township was formed from former Deerfield Township (now Moraine Township) in 1888.

== Geography ==
According to the 2021 census gazetteer files, West Deerfield Township has a total area of 17.90 square miles (46.36 km^{2}), of which 17.79 square miles (46.08 km^{2}) (or 99.40%) is land and 0.11 square miles (0.28 km^{2}) (or 0.60%) is water.

=== Cities, Towns, Villages ===
- Bannockburn (vast majority)
- Deerfield (vast majority)
- Highland Park (west third)
- Lake Forest (southwest two fifths)
- Riverwoods (small portion)

== Economy ==
Walgreens has its corporate headquarters in Deerfield within West Deerfield Township. In 1987 Walgreens employed about 1,100 people at its headquarters, which was at the time in an unincorporated area on the west side of Deerfield. As of 2000 the Walgreens headquarters was still in an unincorporated area in West Deerfield Township.

== Demographics ==
As of the 2020 census there were 31,586 people, 11,249 households, and 9,149 families residing in the township. The population density was 1,764.48 inhabitants per square mile (681.27/km^{2}). There were 11,628 housing units at an average density of 649.57 per square mile (250.80/km^{2}). The racial makeup of the township was 85.53% White, 1.18% African American, 0.18% Native American, 6.37% Asian, 0.01% Pacific Islander, 1.51% from other races, and 5.21% from two or more races. Hispanic or Latino of any race were 4.33% of the population.

There were 11,249 households, out of which 35.70% had children under the age of 18 living with them, 74.09% were married couples living together, 5.36% had a female householder with no spouse present, and 18.67% were non-families. 16.30% of all households were made up of individuals, and 9.60% had someone living alone who was 65 years of age or older. The average household size was 2.73 and the average family size was 3.08.

The township's age distribution consisted of 24.8% under the age of 18, 8.2% from 18 to 24, 17.3% from 25 to 44, 30.9% from 45 to 64, and 18.8% who were 65 years of age or older. The median age was 44.8 years. For every 100 females, there were 98.3 males. For every 100 females age 18 and over, there were 96.1 males.

The median income for a household in the township was $166,904, and the median income for a family was $189,792. Males had a median income of $115,065 versus $54,167 for females. The per capita income for the township was $85,542. About 1.3% of families and 2.6% of the population were below the poverty line, including 2.4% of those under age 18 and 2.4% of those age 65 or over.

Historical population
Census	Pop.	Note	%±
2000	31,794		—
2010	31,077		−2.3%
2020	31,586		1.6%
