= Sydney Barber =

African American naval commander

- Barber receiving the 2021 Nickerson Award
- Military career
- Allegiance: United States of America
- Branch: United States Marine Corps
- Rank: Captain
- Education: United States Naval Academy

Sydney Barber is an American military officer in the United States Marine Corps. She is the first African American woman to serve as Brigade Commander at the United States Naval Academy.

== Biography ==
Barber is from Lake Forest, Illinois and attended Lake Forest High School.

She was a mechanical engineering major at the United States Naval Academy and a member of the Academy's track team, lettering three years and earning the academy's record for outdoor 4 x 100 meter relay. Her father also attended the Naval Academy and graduated in 1991. She also served as co-president of the academy's chapter of Fellowship of Christian Athletes, as secretary of the National Society of Black Engineers, and was a member of the academy's gospel choir and the Midshipman Black Studies Club. Barber graduated from the academy and received a commission in the U.S. Marine Corps as a second lieutenant.

In 2020, Barber was chosen to serve as the spring 2021 Naval Academy's Brigade Commander making her the first African American woman to be selected for this role.
