= Ravine Park =

Community park located in Lake Bluff, Illinois, USA

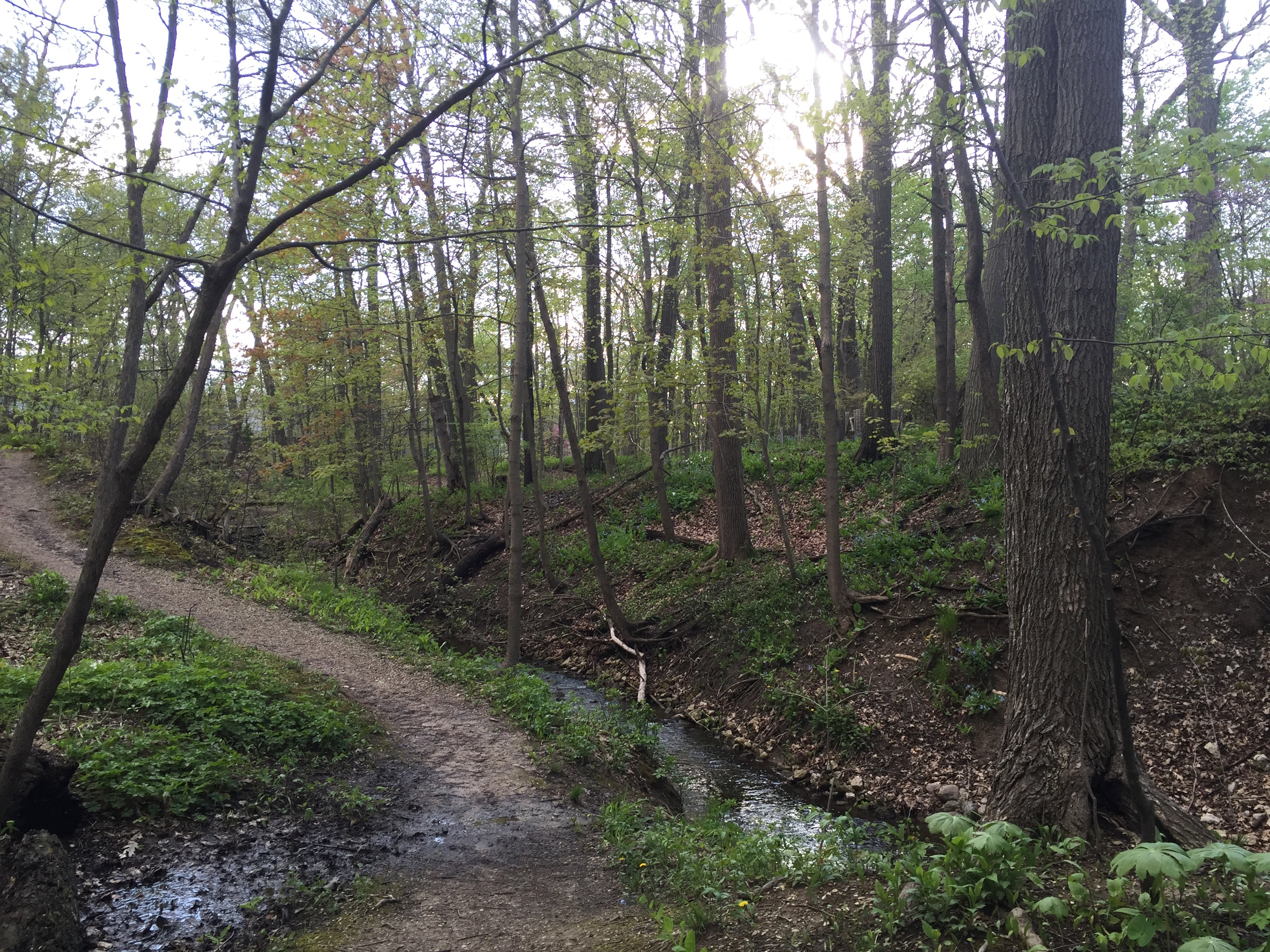
- The main path within the park

- Location within Illinois Location within the United States
- Location: Lake Bluff, Illinois, USA
- Coordinates: 42.277°N 87.842°W
- Area: 14 acres (5.7 ha)
- Operator: Lake Bluff Park District
- Status: Open all year
- Threatened by: Invasive species, erosion

Ravine Park is a community park located in Lake Bluff, Illinois. Measuring roughly 14 acres (5.7 ha) in area, it is dominated by a ravine formed by an ephemeral stream that flows after heavy rainfall and consists of a series of muddy ponds otherwise. The park's main attraction is a small system of nature trails. Ravine Park is one of the only officially protected ravines in all of Lake County, Illinois and offers a refuge for nature in the densely inhabited suburbs of Chicago.

== Geology ==
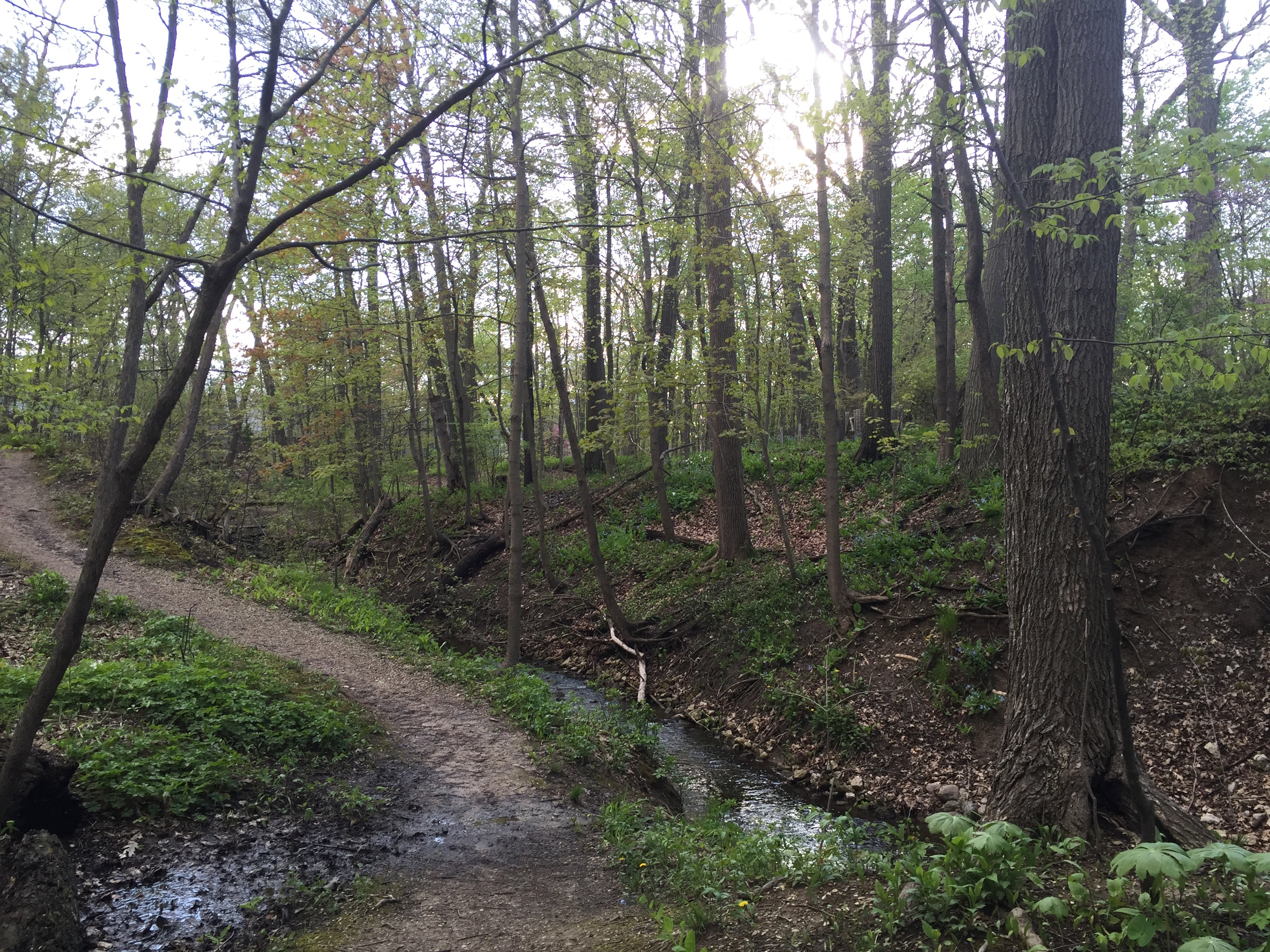
Looking west from within the ravine

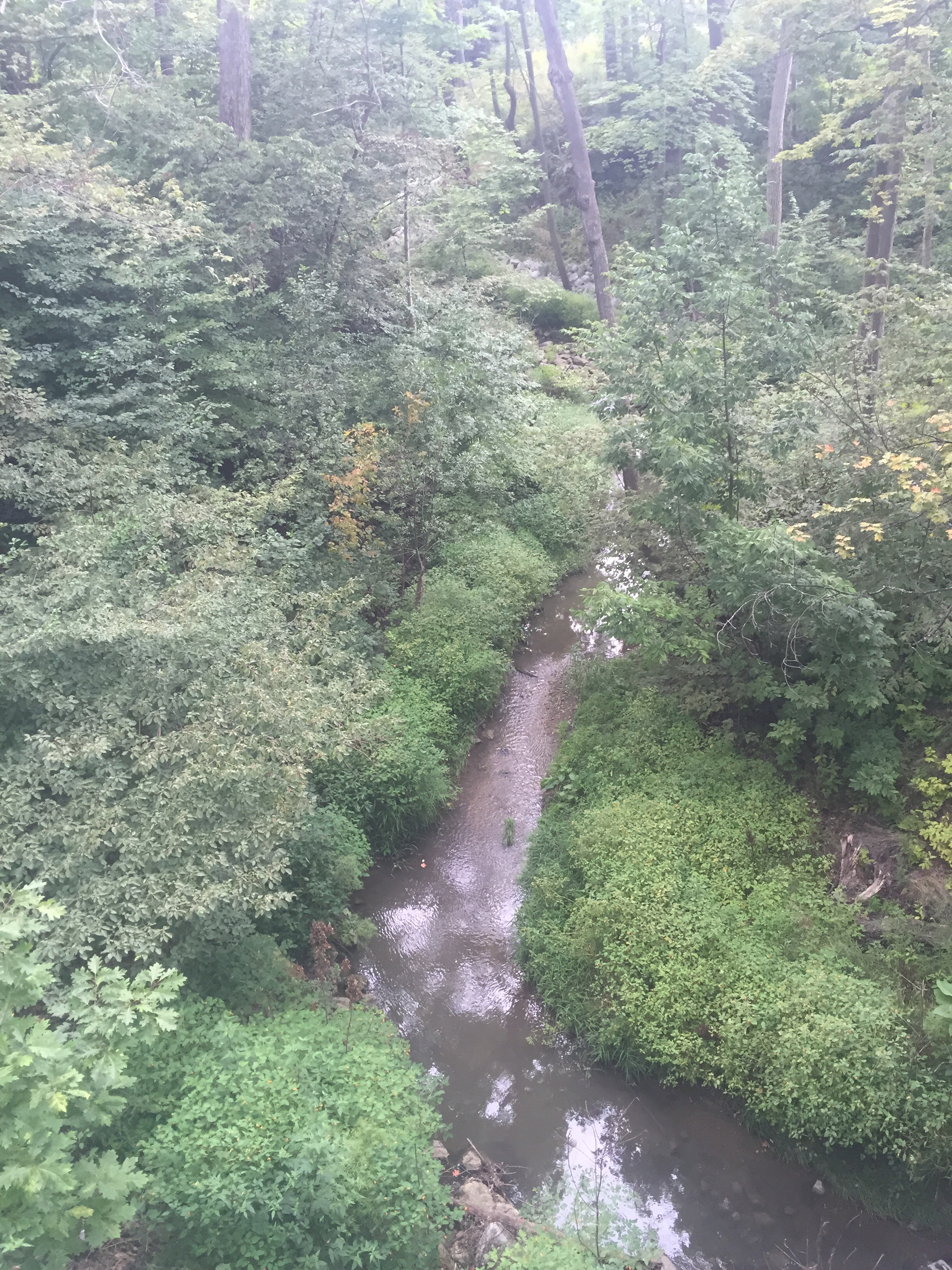
A view of Ravine Park from the Moffett Road bridge

Ravine Park, as its name suggests, comprises one of the thirty or so ravines lining the North Shore of Chicago. The ravines formed as water drained from the high moraine bluffs north of Chicago into Lake Michigan after the retreat of the area's last glacier roughly 12,000 years ago.

In general, the ravines of northeastern Illinois are as deep as 75 feet (23 m) and can extend up to 2 miles (3.2 km) inland from the lake. The ravine occupying Ravine Park in particular is roughly 3,500 feet (1.1 km) in length and about 30 feet (9.1 m) deep at its deepest. However, only half of this distance is easily traversed, with the rest of the steep-walled ravine trackless and covered in dense undergrowth. Ravine Park covers the great majority of the ravine, with only the extreme terminus falling in private property.

The ravine faces significant erosion issues, discharging hundreds of tons of sediment into Lake Michigan each year. An extensive restoration project took place from 2010 to 2013, reducing the discharge rate by an estimated 300 tons annually. The project involved reinforcing a significant stretch of the ravine with stone and native plants while removing invasive plants and repairing storm drain outflows.

== History ==
Even before Lake Bluff was incorporated as a village, the ravine that would come to comprise Ravine Park was furnished with paths and benches so that summer visitors could enjoy the natural scenery. The area formally transferred to the village in 1895, after which point it was administered by the Village Board until 1928.

After the first Fourth of July parade in 1911, the committee responsible for organizing the parade committed itself to improving the village in various ways, leading the village to make the ravine a botanical garden. A Park Commission was formed and determined that 64 species of tree were present in the ravine shortly before establishing a nature path through the area. The Lake Bluff Park District was formed in 1925 and was granted control over Ravine Park in 1928. It continued to maintain the park up to the present day.

== Flora and Fauna ==
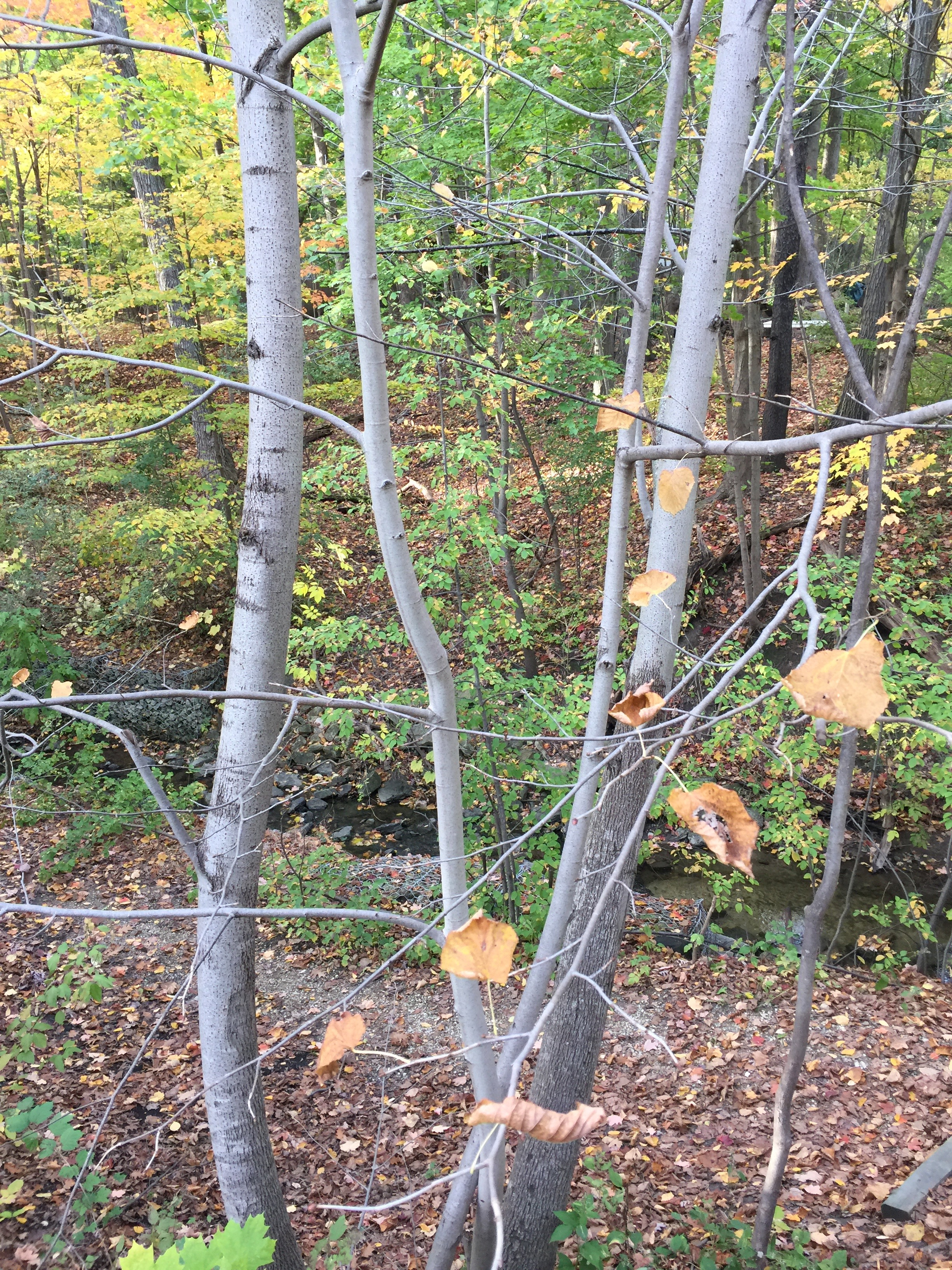
Young Tilia americana in the ravine

The ravines of the North Shore are dominated by temperate deciduous forests. The wind and cold air rising off Lake Michigan conspire to moderate the ravines' temperature, often keeping them significantly cooler than the surrounding area. As a result, the ravines tend to preserve a forest type containing elements similar to the forests of more northerly climes.

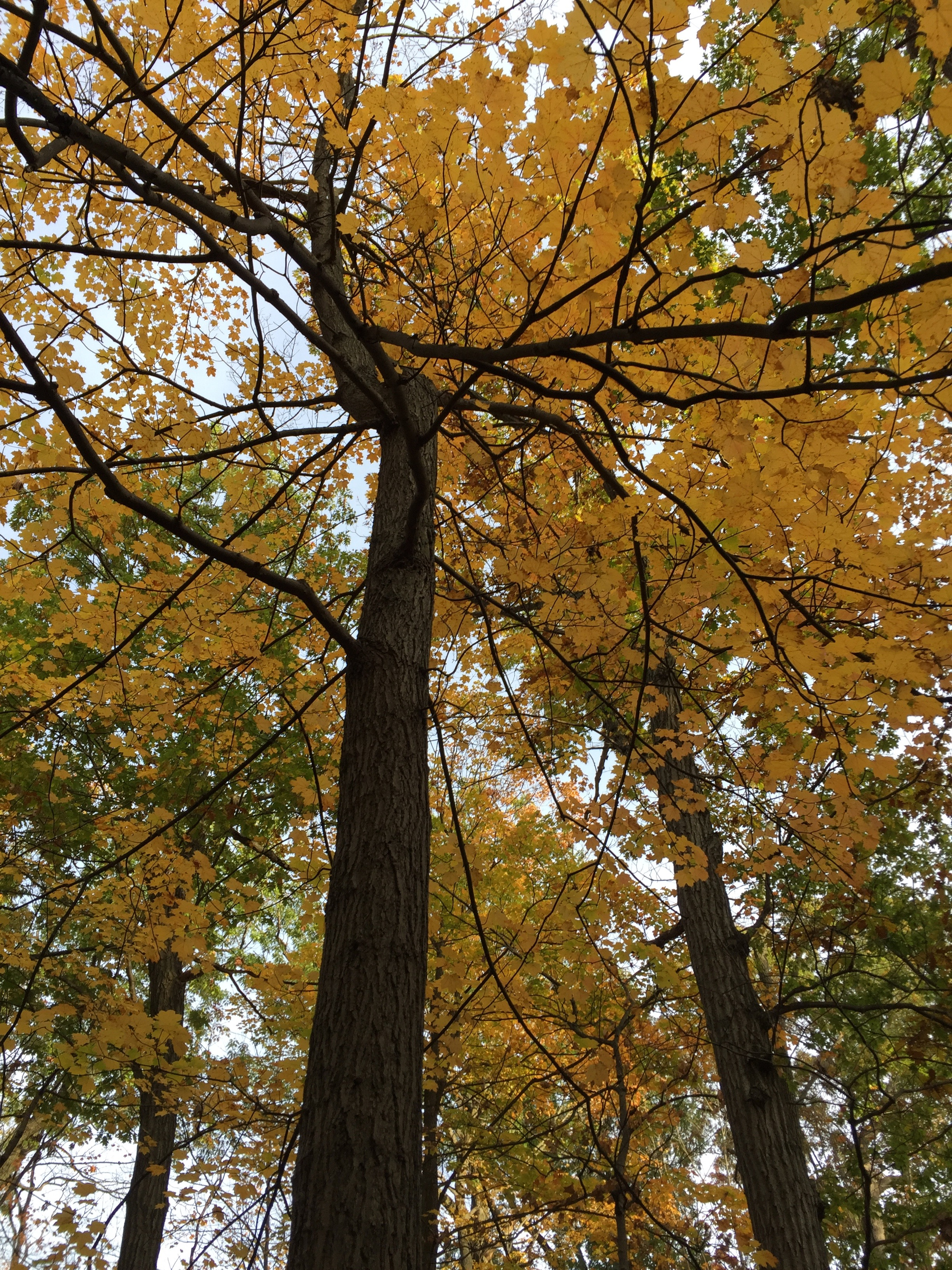
A fairly large Acer saccharum in autumn

The forest cover of Ravine Park is dominated by a mixture of sugar maples, basswood, and red oaks. Various other species, including the highly invasive Norway maple, also account for some of the biomass. The undergrowth is dominated by plants such as Virginia bluebells, mayapple, and trillium. The American witch-hazel is also present in small quantities.

The more common animal denizens of Ravine Park include white-tailed deer, squirrels, and potentially a small population of coyotes. Birds present in the area include the black-capped chickadee and the American robin.

Ravine Park and the other ravines of Lake Bluff are under significant threat from a variety of invasive species including the Norway maple and buckthorn. The ravines also face pollution and degradation from human activity. Lake Bluff Open Lands, a noted volunteer organization in the area, has historically worked with the Park District to remove invasives, clean up pollution, and plant thousands of native plants and wildflowers and conduct limited burnings.
