= Knollwood, Illinois =

- Census-designated place
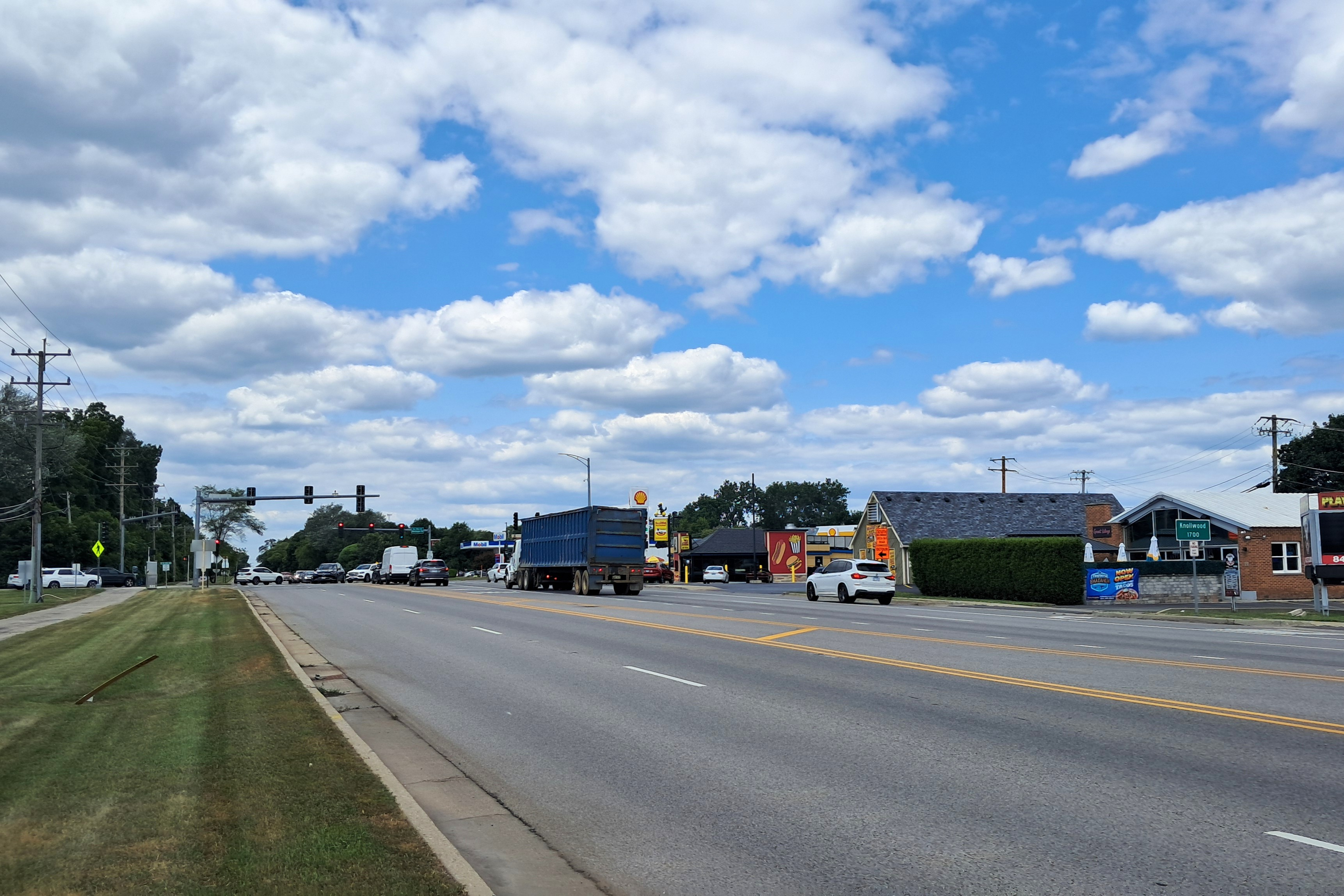
- Buildings in Knollwood across Illinois Route 176

- Location in Illinois Location in the United States
- Coordinates: 42°17′02″N 87°52′34″W
- Country: United States
- State: Illinois
- County: Lake
- Townships: Shields, Libertyville

Area
  - Total: 0.61 sq mi (1.57 km^{2})
  - Land: 0.61 sq mi (1.57 km^{2})
  - Water: 0 sq mi (0.00 km^{2})
- Elevation: 689 ft (210 m)

Population (2020)
  - Total: 2,121
  - Density: 3,507.1/sq mi (1,354.08/km^{2})
- Time zone: UTC-6 (CST)
  - Summer (DST): UTC-5 (CDT)
- ZIP Code: 60044 (Lake Bluff)
- Area codes: 847 and 224
- FIPS code: 17-40364
- GNIS feature ID: 2629857

Knollwood is an unincorporated community and census-designated place (CDP) in Lake County, Illinois, United States. Per the 2020 census, the population was 2,221. It is located within Shields Township and Libertyville Township. Knollwood shares a ZIP Code with the neighboring village of Lake Bluff, and children attend Lake Bluff schools. The residents of Knollwood were served by the Knollwood Fire Department until October 2018, after the trustees of the Rockland Fire Protection District ended their relationship with the department. Residents now receive fire protection from the Libertyville and Lake Forest fire departments.

== History ==
The name "Knollwood" first became associated with the area in the early 20th century. The Chicago North Shore and Milwaukee Railroad stop, located at the intersection of Rockland Road and Telegraph Road (now Waukegan Road), was named "Creamer Corners". To the southwest of the station was a 248-acre (100 ha) property, consisting of two farms, owned by Mrs. Granger Farwell and Mr. A.C. Accord. This property was known as "Knollwood Farm". In 1923, Knollwood Farm was purchased by a group of wealthy Chicago businessmen (including Samuel Insull, Robert P. Lamont, Nathan William MacChesney and Thomas E. Wilson), who wished to turn the land into a country club. The following year, the Knollwood Country Club was founded, and the purchase was finalized in 1925. The community that sprang up around the club came to be known as Knollwood.

Knollwood's volunteer fire department was founded as the Rockland Fire Department and recognized by the state government in January 1947. Two years later, the department purchased their first fire engine, and a fire department building was constructed in 1951. In 1952, the Rockland Fire Department joined the Illinois Association of Fire Protection Districts and changed its name to the Knollwood Fire Department. The original firehouse was replaced with a modern facility in the same location in 2002, with the new building opening the following year.

Under state statute, trustees of the Fire Protection District Board were appointed by the Lake County Board. The trustees included Robert Grum, Dan Rogers and Carl Snoblin. Mr. Grum, a former full-time member of the Lake Forest Fire Department who retired as deputy chief, and Dan Rogers led the efforts to dissolve the district. Despite a referendum that required trustees to be elected, rather than appointed, and a majority of residents opposing his re-appointment, Rogers was re-appointed to his position, and along with Trustee Grum cast the voted needed to approve an Inter-Governmental Agreement that ended Knollwood FD operations on August 31, 2018.

Several unsuccessful referendums for annexation into the neighboring village of Lake Bluff were held in 1978, 1982, and 1996.

== Geography ==
Knollwood is located in eastern Lake County and is bordered by the village of Lake Bluff to the north, east, and southeast, by the city of Lake Forest to the south, and by the village of Green Oaks to the west. Downtown Chicago is 34 miles (55 km) to the south.

According to the 2021 census gazetteer files, Knollwood has a total area of 0.61 square miles (1.58 km^{2}), all land.

== Demographics ==
Historical population
Census	Pop.	Note	%±
2010	1,747		—
2020	2,121		21.4%
U.S. Decennial Census; 2010 2020

Knollwood was first listed as a census designated place in the 2010 U.S. census.

=== Racial and ethnic composition ===
Knollwood CDP, Illinois – Racial and ethnic composition Note: the US Census treats Hispanic/Latino as an ethnic category. This table excludes Latinos from the racial categories and assigns them to a separate category. Hispanics/Latinos may be of any race.
Race / Ethnicity (NH = Non-Hispanic)	Pop 2010	Pop 2020	% 2010	% 2020
White alone (NH)	1,457	1,339	83.40%	63.13%
Black or African American alone (NH)	73	87	4.18%	4.10%
Native American or Alaska Native alone (NH)	0	2	0.00%	0.09%
Asian alone (NH)	84	109	4.81%	5.14%
Native Hawaiian or Pacific Islander alone (NH)	0	0	0.00%	0.00%
Other race alone (NH)	1	7	0.06%	0.33%
Mixed race or Multiracial (NH)	21	61	1.20%	2.88%
Hispanic or Latino (any race)	111	516	6.35%	24.33%
Total	1,747	2,121	100.00%	100.00%

=== 2020 census ===
As of the 2020 census, Knollwood had a population of 2,121. The population density was 3,505.79 inhabitants per square mile (1,353.59/km^{2}). The median age was 40.9 years. 23.4% of residents were under the age of 18 and 20.2% of residents were 65 years of age or older. For every 100 females there were 99.3 males, and for every 100 females age 18 and over there were 96.0 males age 18 and over.

100.0% of residents lived in urban areas, while 0.0% lived in rural areas.

There were 790 households in Knollwood, of which 33.8% had children under the age of 18 living in them. Of all households, 50.1% were married-couple households, 21.8% were households with a male householder and no spouse or partner present, and 22.2% were households with a female householder and no spouse or partner present. About 22.5% of all households were made up of individuals and 9.0% had someone living alone who was 65 years of age or older.

There were 834 housing units at an average density of 1,378.51 per square mile (532.25/km^{2}), of which 5.3% were vacant. The homeowner vacancy rate was 1.4% and the rental vacancy rate was 6.9%.

=== Income and poverty ===
The median income for a household in the CDP was $126,250, and the median income for a family was $144,000. Males had a median income of $69,107 versus $54,167 for females. The per capita income for the CDP was $39,902. About 4.3% of families and 3.0% of the population were below the poverty line, including 1.9% of those under age 18 and 11.2% of those age 65 or over.

== Transportation ==
=== Road ===
U.S. Route 41 passes through the eastern part of Knollwood, though several sections fall within the boundaries of Lake Bluff. It leads north 6 miles (10 km) to Gurnee and south 8 miles (13 km) to Highland Park. Portions of Illinois Route 43 (Waukegan Road) and Illinois Route 176 (Rockland Road) are also located within Knollwood, although the actual intersection of the two roads lies along the Lake Bluff/Knollwood boundary. Route 43 leads north to Gurnee and south 8 miles (13 km) to Deerfield, while Route 176 leads east 2 miles (3 km) to Lake Bluff and west the same distance to Interstate 94 at Exit 16.

=== Rail ===
Knollwood was served by the Mundelein Branch of the Chicago, North Shore and Milwaukee interurban railroad until its abandonment on January 21, 1963. Since then, Knollwood has not been served by passenger rail, though the Lake Bluff Metra Station is located nearby. The Leithton Subdivision of the Canadian National Railway (Formerly the Western Subdivision of the Elgin, Joliet and Eastern Railway) runs through Knollwood, crossing Route 43 at grade. This line was built in the late 1880s as part of the short-lived Waukegan and Southwestern Railway, before it was acquired by the Elgin, Joliet and Eastern in 1891.

== Education ==
Knollwood residents are served by Lake Bluff School District 65, and Lake Forest High School District 115. Public school students receive their elementary education (Kindergarten through Fifth grade) at Lake Bluff Elementary School, middle school education (Sixth grade through Eighth grade) at Lake Bluff Middle School and high school education (Ninth grade through Twelfth grade) at Lake Forest High School. The defunct Lake Bluff West Elementary School (Intended for children living in Knollwood and western Lake Bluff) was also located in Knollwood. The school was constructed in 1962 and opened in 1963. In 1994, District 65 vacated the building, and it currently serves as headquarters for the Shields Township supervisor.
