= Lake Bluff, Illinois =

Village in Illinois, United States

Lake Bluff, Illinois Rockland
- Village
- The Village of Lake Bluff
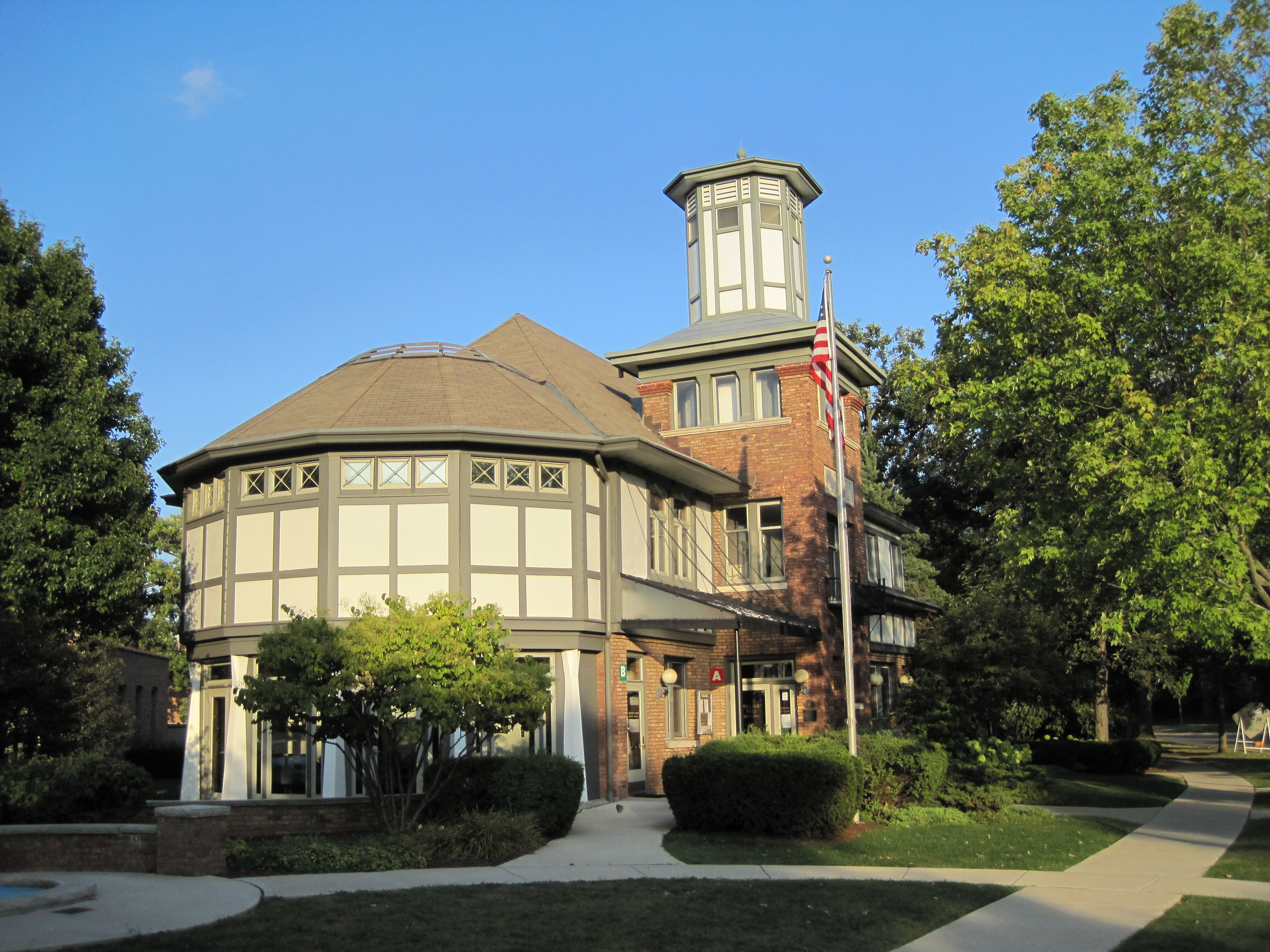
- Lake Bluff Village Hall

- Flag Logo

- Location of Lake Bluff in Lake County, Illinois.
- Coordinates: 42°17′18″N 87°52′12″W
- Country: United States
- State: Illinois
- County: Lake
- Township: Shields
- Incorporated: September 21, 1895

Government
  - Body: Village Board
  - Village President: Regis Charlot

Area
  - Total: 4.08 sq mi (10.58 km^{2})
  - Land: 4.08 sq mi (10.56 km^{2})
  - Water: 0.0077 sq mi (0.02 km^{2})
- Elevation: 692 ft (211 m)

Population (2020)
  - Total: 5,616
  - Density: 1,377.8/sq mi (531.97/km^{2})
- Time zone: UTC-6 (CST)
  - Summer (DST): UTC-5 (CDT)
- ZIP code: 60044
- Area codes: Area codes 847 and 224
- FIPS code: 17-40910
- GNIS feature ID: 2398377
- Website: www.lakebluff.org

Lake Bluff (formerly Rockland) is a village in Lake County, Illinois, United States. Per the 2020 census, the population was 5,616.

== History ==
The first non-native settler family to claim land within the area now part of Lake Bluff arrived in 1836. John and Catherine Cloes claimed 100 acres of land extending from the lake west to the Green Bay Trail. In 1849, a few residents left to seek their fortune in the California gold rush. In 1837, William and Mary Dwyer claimed the land just north of the former Central School. They opened and operated a stage coach stop and tavern along the Green Bay Trail. Some of the other early settlers were Henry and Angeline Ostrander, James Cole and William Whitnell.

In 1855, the first railroad through Lake County was completed, running from Chicago through the county line. Henry Ostrander owned the land where the depot was to be placed, and he agreed to donate the site if the depot were called "Rockland." Therefore, this area, known previously as the Dwyer Settlement and Oak Hill, became Rockland, the only stop between Highland Park and Waukegan. Rockland had a post office and general store on Mawman Avenue with a small school and church located west of the tracks near Green Bay Road.

In 1875, a group of Methodist ministers led by Solomon Thatcher of River Forest purchased 100 acres of lakefront property from Ben Cloes, the youngest son of the first settlers. The Lake Bluff Camp Meeting Association was formed and Rockland was renamed "Lake Bluff." The Association planned a resort that would provide not only religious activities but also social, cultural, educational and recreational programs. From the beginning, the Camp Meeting was successful at bringing in well-known personalities of the time, such as Frances Willard and Mrs. Rutherford B. Hayes. Summer visitors were attracted to Lake Bluff to enjoy the beach and ravines and participate in the Camp Meeting activities. A 10-acre lake in the center of town, Artesian Lake, provided additional recreational opportunities. Lake Bluff was a summer colony at the time, as most residents were seasonal.

Land was divided into 25-foot lots on which a cottage "could be erected within 20 days of purchase for $250." The first hotel, the Bluff Lodge, was opened in 1876. By the mid-1880s there were more than 30 hotels and boarding houses and a large tabernacle with seating for more than 2,000 people.

Lake Bluff incorporated as a village in 1895. Charles Trusdell, the first Village President, built his home at 115 East Center Avenue. The East School opened in September 1895. In 1904, the railroad station was erected, and in 1905 the present Village Hall was built.

During the First World War, Lake Bluff was proclaimed the "most patriotic small town in America" for the efforts of the residents in supporting the Red Cross and purchasing an ambulance to send to France.

In the 1920s, Lake Bluff made plans to join the other North Shore suburbs in the race to attract new homes and growing families. New brick stores were added in the business block, and a large addition to East School was constructed. However, 1929 brought the Great Depression, and the plans for expansion never materialized.

== Geography ==
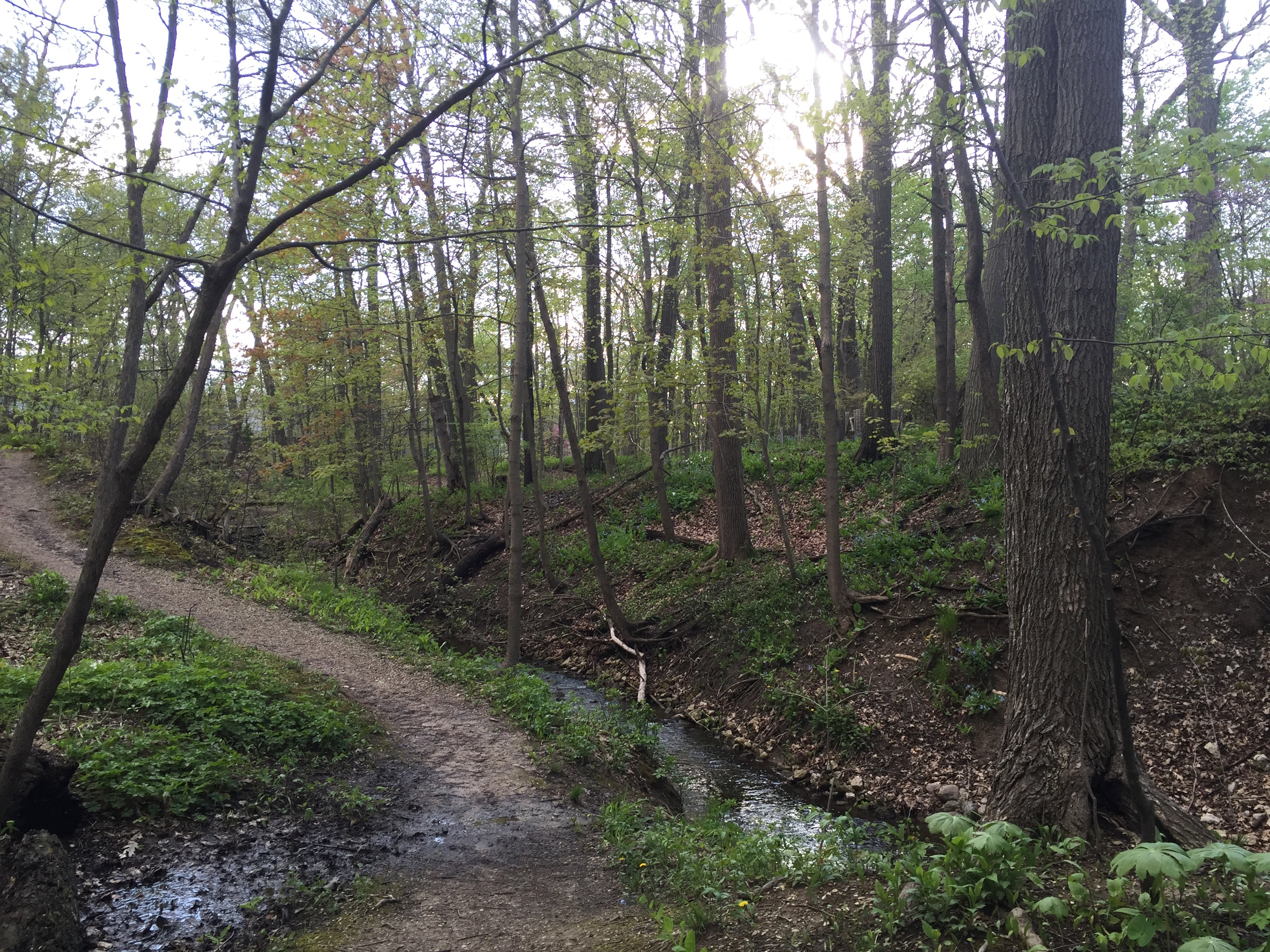
The main trail of Ravine Park

Lake Bluff is located in the North Shore area.

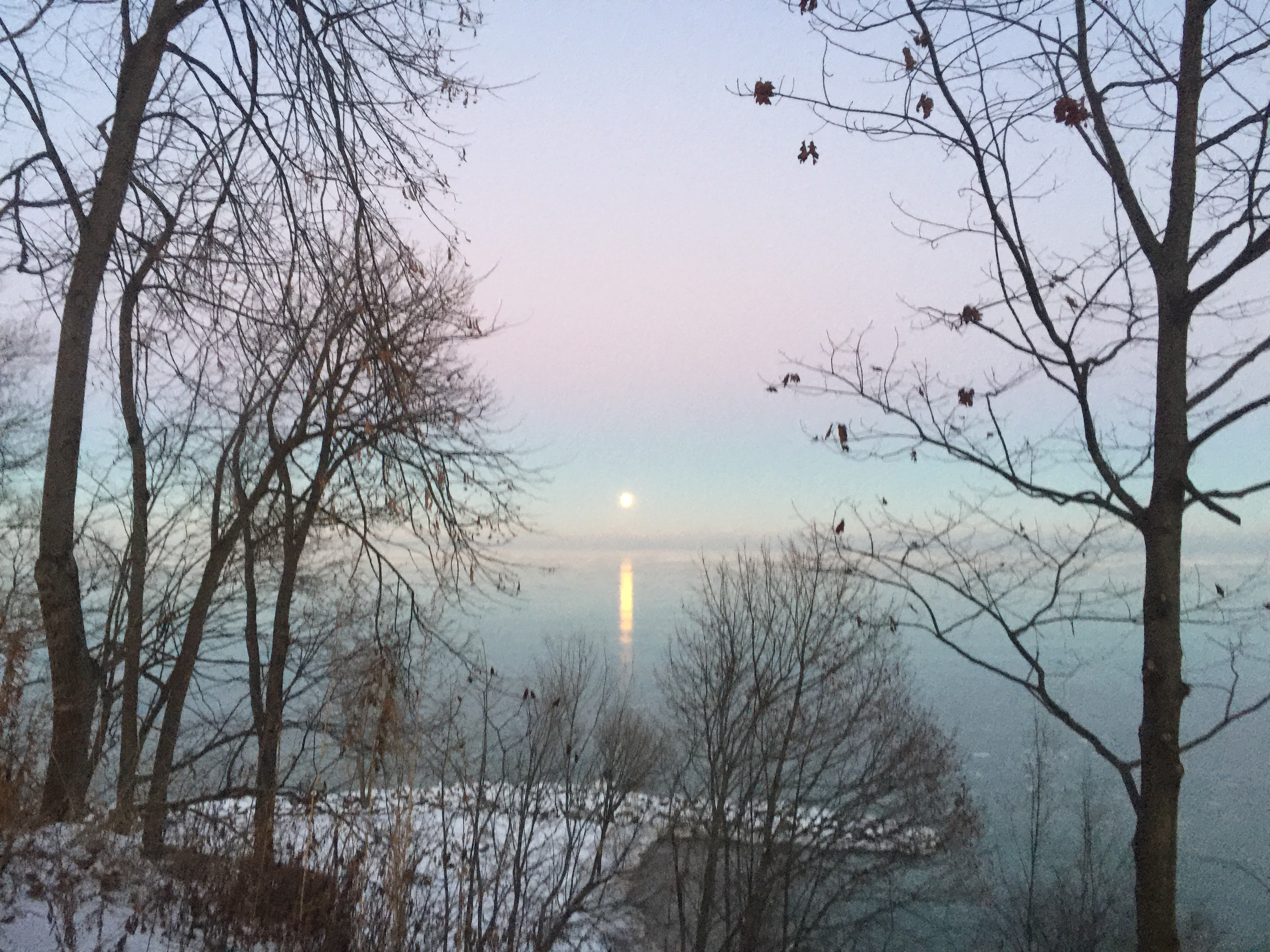
A New Year's Day moonrise over Lake Michigan

According to the 2021 census gazetteer files, Lake Bluff has a total area of 4.09 square miles (10.59 km^{2}), of which 4.08 square miles (10.57 km^{2}) (or 99.76%) is land and 0.01 square miles (0.03 km^{2}) (or 0.24%) is water. It is bordered by Lake Michigan on the east, Naval Station Great Lakes to the north, Lake Forest to the south, and Libertyville to the west. The town is named for the prominent bluff overlooking Lake Michigan that extends across the eastern boundary.

Half of Lake Bluff's land area is residential in nature, while the rest is mainly devoted to parks and recreation. Major parks include Blair Park, Ravine Park, Sunrise Park, and Artesian Park.

== Demographics ==
Historical population
Census	Pop.	Note	%±
1900	490		—
1910	726		48.2%
1920	819		12.8%
1930	1,452		77.3%
1940	1,729		19.1%
1950	2,000		15.7%
1960	3,494		74.7%
1970	5,008		43.3%
1980	4,434		−11.5%
1990	5,513		24.3%
2000	6,056		9.8%
2010	5,722		−5.5%
2020	5,616		−1.9%
U.S. Decennial Census; 2010 2020

=== Racial and ethnic composition ===
Lake Bluff village, Illinois – Racial and ethnic composition Note: the US Census treats Hispanic/Latino as an ethnic category. This table excludes Latinos from the racial categories and assigns them to a separate category. Hispanics/Latinos may be of any race.
Race / Ethnicity (NH = Non-Hispanic)	Pop 2000	Pop 2010	Pop 2020	% 2000	% 2010	% 2020
White alone (NH)	5,710	5,182	4,841	94.29%	90.56%	86.20%
Black or African American alone (NH)	31	33	29	0.51%	0.58%	0.52%
Native American or Alaska Native alone (NH)	1	6	2	0.02%	0.10%	0.04%
Asian alone (NH)	198	317	314	3.27%	5.54%	5.59%
Native Hawaiian or Pacific Islander alone (NH)	2	0	1	0.03%	0.00%	0.02%
Other race alone (NH)	10	3	29	0.17%	0.05%	0.52%
Mixed race or Multiracial (NH)	32	72	206	0.53%	1.26%	3.67%
Hispanic or Latino (any race)	72	109	194	1.19%	1.90%	3.45%
Total	6,056	5,722	5,616	100.00%	100.00%	100.00%

=== 2020 census ===
As of the 2020 census, Lake Bluff had a population of 5,616. The median age was 45.3 years. 25.1% of residents were under the age of 18 and 18.1% of residents were 65 years of age or older. For every 100 females there were 95.2 males, and for every 100 females age 18 and over there were 92.6 males age 18 and over.

97.2% of residents lived in urban areas, while 2.8% lived in rural areas.

There were 2,042 households and 1,659 families in Lake Bluff, of which 36.9% had children under the age of 18 living in them. Of all households, 71.3% were married-couple households, 8.8% were households with a male householder and no spouse or partner present, and 17.2% were households with a female householder and no spouse or partner present. About 16.6% of all households were made up of individuals and 8.9% had someone living alone who was 65 years of age or older.

The population density was 1,374.45 inhabitants per square mile (530.68/km^{2}). There were 2,174 housing units at an average density of 532.06 per square mile (205.43/km^{2}), of which 6.1% were vacant. The homeowner vacancy rate was 1.7% and the rental vacancy rate was 5.5%.

=== Income and poverty ===
The median income for a household in the village was $174,444, and the median income for a family was $196,094. Males had a median income of $145,875 versus $53,854 for females. The per capita income for the village was $87,123. About 4.1% of families and 3.2% of the population were below the poverty line, including 2.6% of those under age 18 and 0.5% of those age 65 or over.

== Transportation ==
=== Road ===
U.S. Route 41 passes through the western portion of the village, and directly west of Lake Bluff is Interstate 94, both highways providing access for commuters to Chicago or Milwaukee.

During the summer of 2010, a wild turkey began to inhabit the corner of Green Bay Road and Route 176, capturing the hearts of the local residents and inspiring a book called The Town Turkey. The following year, another wild turkey was spotted on Route 176.

Scranton Avenue runs through the central business district and functions as a "Main Street" of sorts. The local police station, fire department, and the Village Hall are located on East Center Avenue. Both roads run from the center of town to the lake.

=== Rail ===
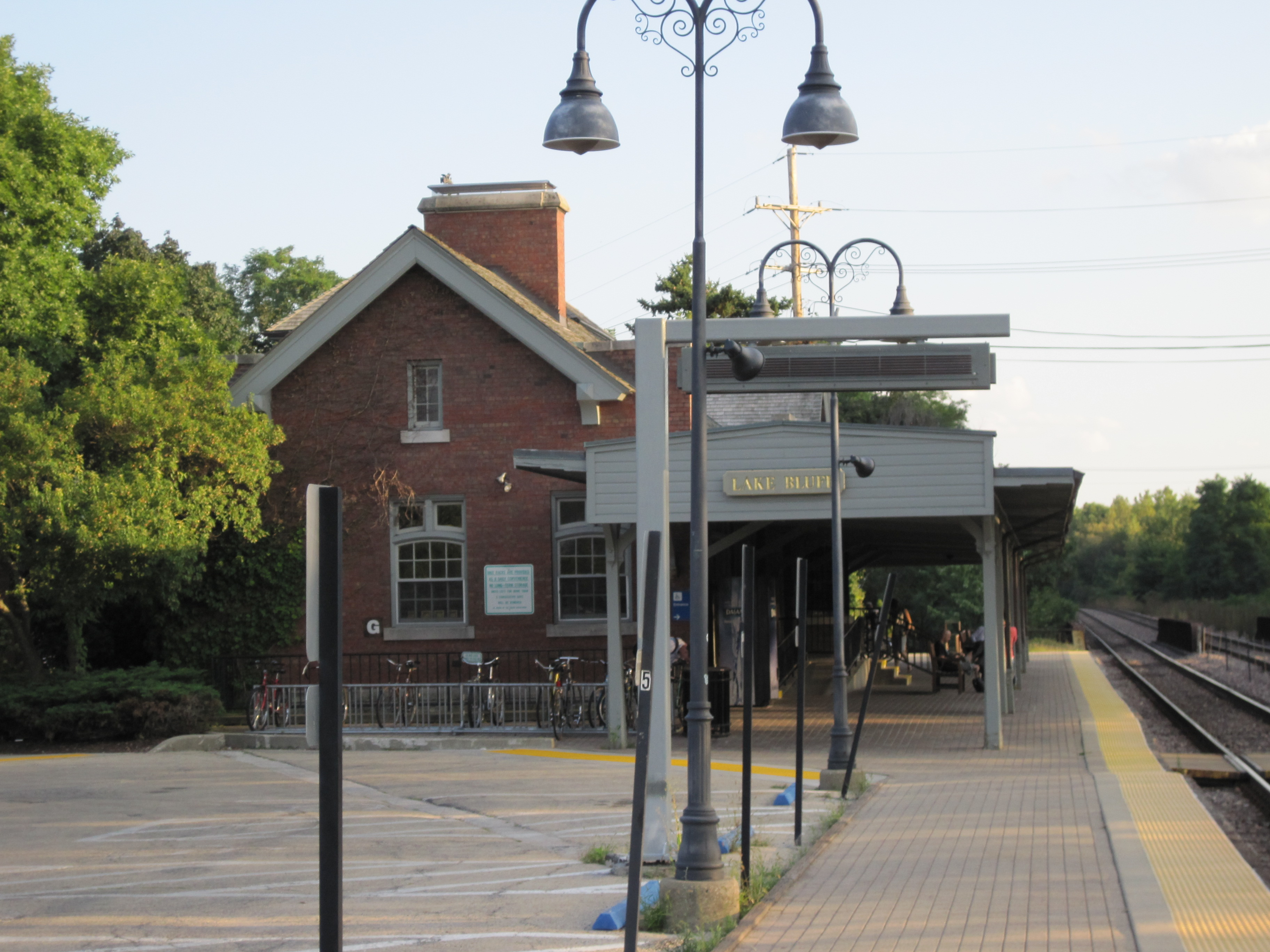
Lake Bluff Metra Station

Until its bankruptcy in 1962, the Chicago North Shore and Milwaukee electric interurban railroad between Chicago's "Loop" and Milwaukee had a stop in Lake Bluff. As of 2018, the Union Pacific Railroad (formerly the Chicago & North Western Railway and later the Chicago and North Western Transportation Company) still runs through Lake Bluff. This line, part of Chicago's Metra commuter rail agency, provides access to Chicago through Ogilvie Station and to Kenosha, Wisconsin (but no longer to Racine and Milwaukee as did the Milwaukee Division of the "Northwestern" in earlier times).

Although not a passenger rail line, the Elgin, Joliet and Eastern Railway "Outer Belt Line" also has trackage in Lake Bluff.

== Education ==
Lake Bluff East Elementary School, originally known as "Lake Bluff School", was the first school in Lake Bluff. In 1963, Lake Bluff West Elementary School was built for children living in west Lake Bluff (unincorporated Knollwood). In 1967, Lake Bluff Central Elementary School was constructed for students in north Lake Bluff. In the 1970s, West School was shut down, and held many other titles, and the whole system moved from geographic centers to grade/specific attendance centers. In April 2007, a referendum passed by only 22 votes to build a new school. In a land swap with the park district, District 65 acquired land adjacent to the old Central School and gave up land adjacent to the old West School. West School was sold in May 2007 for approximately 1 million dollars, which was also the minimum bid for the property. The new Lake Bluff Elementary School (grades K-5) opened on September 28, 2009. Additions and remodeling were also made to the Lake Bluff Middle School (grades 6–8). At the Middle School part of the original "Lake Bluff School" is now on display. East School held its final classes through September 2009. The cost of the new Lake Bluff Elementary School was approximately $20 million and is 82,000 square feet (7,600 m^{2}). Lake Bluff Middle School was renovated in 2016 with two new classroom wings, a new library, cafeteria, and a Makerspace.

Public schools

- Lake Bluff Elementary School (Kindergarten through 5th grade)
- Lake Bluff Middle School (6th grade through 8th grade)
- Lake Bluff high school students attend Lake Forest High School in Lake Forest.

Private school

- Forest Bluff School (Montessori; Ages 18 months through 8th grade)

Defunct

- Lake Bluff West Elementary School (closed in 1994, now serves as rental office space)
- Lake Bluff Central Elementary School (closed and demolished in 2008)
- Lake Bluff East Elementary School (closed in 2009, demolished in 2010)

== Arts and culture ==
Every alternating year the Lake Bluff History Museum organizes a "Ghost Walk" around Halloween to celebrate their haunted history. This includes group tours of the town led by residents dressed as ghouls who tell stories about creepy occurrences in the past.

Every year there are many cultural events on the Village Green including a Veterans Day flag raising ceremony, Gazebo lighting (Christmas), and a farmers' market every Friday in the summer.

Each year Lake Bluff organizes a notable parade on Independence Day sponsored by the Lake Bluff July 4 Committee with assistance from American Legion Post 510. The parade features many organizations and entertainers, including a performance by synchronized lawnmower, the local Boy Scout Troop, and various other associations from around the North Shore.

== Cultural references ==
- Ray Bradbury's short story The Lake (1944) is set in Lake Bluff.
- The 1978 film A Wedding was filmed in Lake Bluff, near the border between Lake Bluff and the Great Lakes Naval Facility.

== Notable people ==
- William M. Blair, investment banker founding William Blair & Company, prominent in Chicago's business and civic communities.
- Henry Williams Blodgett, an "eminent Illinois federal district judge and railroad president".
- John H. Bryan, owner of Crab Tree Farm, CEO of Sara Lee Corporation, creator of Millennium Park in Chicago.
- Bay Darnell, stock car racing driver and builder.
- Jacob Doyle, professional baseball player in the first season of Major League Baseball
- Grace Durand, owner of Crab Tree Farm, activist, and prominent socialite
- Gary Groh, PGA Tour professional golfer
- Alice Corbin Henderson, poet and author
- William Penhallow Henderson, painter and architect
- Ken Henry (speed skater), Olympic gold medalist speed skater & coach
- David Jenkins, television writer and producer
- Elfrieda Knaak, schoolteacher
- Thomas F. Lachner, businessman and politician
- Wally Lemm, head football coach for Lake Forest College, Houston Oilers, and St. Louis Cardinals (NFL)
- Rebecca Makkai, author
- Richard Marx, singer-songwriter
- Robert McClory, member of the United States House of Representatives, village attorney, and Boy Scout leader
- Mark Morettini, actor
- Matt Nagy, former head coach of the Chicago Bears
- Ryan Pace, former general manager of the Chicago Bears
- David Pasquesi, actor
- John Paxson, former point guard and general manager of the Chicago Bulls
- Rob Pelinka, general manager of NBA's Los Angeles Lakers, former University of Michigan player and agent for Kobe Bryant
- Tommy Rees, quarterback and offensive coordinator for the Cleveland Browns
- Cynthia Rhodes, dancer and actress
- Hadley Richardson, first wife of Ernest Hemingway
- Robert Rockwell, actor
- Phil Rosenthal (columnist), columnist for the Chicago Tribune
- Ryne Sandberg, former Chicago Cubs infielder and manager of the Philadelphia Phillies
- Richard Warren Sears, founder of Sears, Roebuck & Company
- Martha Sleeper, silent film and Broadway actress
- Barbara Trentham, actress
- Edgar Uihlein, founder of General Binding Corporation, heir of the Joseph Schlitz Brewing Company
- Casey Urlacher, brother of Brian Urlacher and Arena Football League player
- William Vanderkloot, pilot serving Winston Churchill
- Fred Wacker, Formula One driver, socialite, musician, and businessman
- Leslie Wildman, composer
