= Jacob Doyle =

American baseball player (1855–1941)

- Shortstop
- Born: November 26, 1855; Leesburg, Virginia
- Died: August 15, 1941 (aged 85); Lake Bluff, Illinois
- Batted: Unknown Threw: Unknown

MLB debut
- April 20, 1872, for the Washington Nationals

Last MLB appearance
- May 25, 1872, for the Washington Nationals

MLB statistics
- Batting average: .268
- Home runs: 0
- Runs batted in: 9
- Stats at Baseball Reference

Teams
- Washington Nationals (1872)

Jacob Dixon Doyle (November 26, 1855 – August 15, 1941) was an American Major League Baseball shortstop who played for the 1872 Washington Nationals of the National Association, the first professional league. He was born in Leesburg, Virginia.

In his nine-game career, Doyle hit .268, with six runs, one double, and nine RBIs. At 16 years of age, he was the youngest player in the National Association during the 1872 season.

Doyle died in Lake Bluff, Illinois at the age of 85, and is interred at North Shore Garden of Memories in Chicago, Illinois. At the time of his death he had been the last living player from the 1872 season.
