= William Vanderkloot =

William J. Vanderkloot, Jr.
- Born: 2 January 1915; Lake Bluff, Illinois
- Died: 8 April 2000 (aged 85); Ocala, Marion, Florida
- Occupation: pilot
- Known for: flying Winston Churchill to wartime meetings
- Spouse: Della Vanderkloot (1939-1999, her death)
- Awards: Commander of the Order of the British Empire

William J. Vanderkloot, Jr. (2 January 1915 in Lake Bluff, Illinois – 8 April 2000 in Ocala, Marion, Florida) was a pilot who flew Winston Churchill over enemy territory on diplomatic missions during World War II.

== Early years ==
Vanderkloot was the son of William J Vanderkloot and Florence M Cary. He was descended from Stephen Genung, of Morris County, New Jersey, who served as a private in New Jersey state troops during the American Revolution. William attended Culver Military Academy in Indiana, and though he commanded the academy's Black Horse Troop, a cavalry unit, at age 16, he had long watched planes coming and going from the Glenview Naval Air Station. During summers, he worked as a ground crewman for a local flying circus so he could be closer to the airplanes. At his parents' urging, he briefly studied law at the University of Virginia. But while he was there, Vanderkloot sold his car, bought a homemade aircraft with the money and, after a few flying lessons, crashed it. He later attended Parks Air College in East St. Louis, and during the 1930s was a pilot for Trans World Airlines.

== World War II ==
Vanderkloot went to Montreal in 1941, before the Japanese bombing of Pearl Harbor, and volunteered with the Royal Air Force Ferry Command to transfer long-range planes to Great Britain.

Arriving in Britain, he was ordered to RAF headquarters in July 1942 and asked by Sir Charles Portal, RAF chief of staff, if there was a safe, direct route from England to Cairo by air. In the specially modified B24 Liberator bomber Commando, which he had just delivered to Prestwick, Vanderkloot said he could make the trip with one stop in Gibraltar. He would at first head eastwards, staying over the sea in the afternoon, and then after dusk, turn sharply south, flying over Spanish and Vichy territory in Africa in the dark before turning east again for the Nile and approaching Cairo from the south. Thus the danger from land-based enemy aircraft in North Africa and Sicily would be avoided without having to fly halfway around Africa. Portal told Vanderkloot to "stay handy to the telephone". The next day Vanderkloot was taken to Winston Churchill's residence at No. 10 Downing Street. Churchill, clad in robe and slippers, offered him a drink, beginning a relationship that had Vanderkloot flying the Prime Minister on sensitive diplomatic trips across war-torn Europe, Russia, North Africa and the Middle East. "He took calculated risks," said his son, William III. "There was a lot more risk in flying back then. It was a frontier, and I think all the old pilots will say it, secretly to themselves, that they enjoyed being on their own. It was the wild blue yonder." As Churchill's pilot, Vanderkloot conveyed the Prime Minister to Egypt to sack Claude Auchinleck, commander of the British army in North Africa and took Churchill to high-level talks in Moscow with Joseph Stalin, to Turkey to determine that country's wartime intentions, and to the Casablanca Conference in 1943.

== Post-war ==
Vanderkloot headed the aviation department of Johns Manville Corp. in New York, piloting executive jets and helicopters. He retired in 1970 to Florida.
