= Elfrieda Knaak =

American schoolteacher (1898–1928)

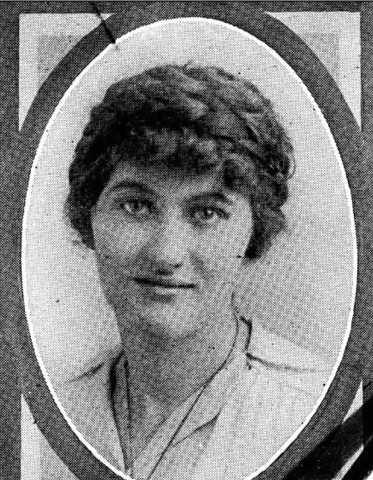
Elfrieda Knaak

Elfrieda Grace Knaak was an American schoolteacher whose death caused a media sensation.

Knaak was born September 21, 1898, in Deerfield, Illinois to Theodore Ludwig Knaak and Elise Knaak (née Becker). Both her parents were born in Germany and immigrated to the United States; they married in Illinois in 1873. Elfrieda was the youngest of nine siblings: brothers Theodore, Edward, Otto, Alvin, and Rudolph, and sisters Emilie, Ida, and Amanda. Elfrieda attended Deerfield-Shields high school, completed the college course at Michigan's state normal school, and studied further at the University of Illinois for one year and the University of Chicago for two years. She worked as a schoolteacher and a Sunday School teacher in Deerfield and Waukegan, and a sales agent for Chicago's Compton Book Company's encyclopedias. She was a charter member and Associate Conductress of the Deerfield chapter of the Masonic Order of the Eastern Star, which was organized at the home of her sister Emilie in June 5, 1924. Her mysterious and gruesome burning death in 1928 became a news sensation.

== Death ==
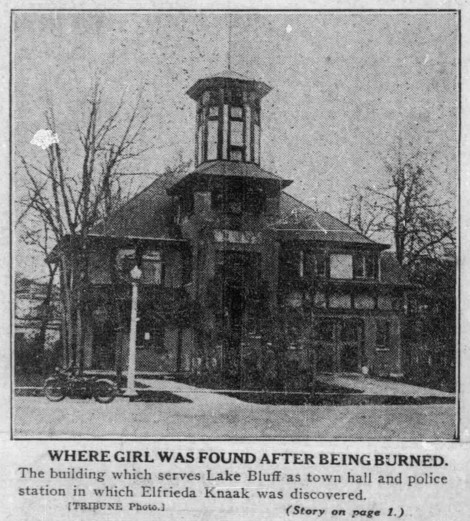
Lake Bluff Village Hall

Elfrieda Knaak died on November 2, 1928 in Lake Forest, Illinois, at age 30. She is buried in Deerfield Cemetery.

At 7:30 a.m. on Tuesday, October 30, 1928, Elfrieda was found in the furnace room of the Lake Bluff village hall, unclothed, with severe burns on her hands, feet, head, neck, and face. Doctors later concluded she was not burned until shortly before, about 7:00 a.m. that morning. She was discovered by street employee and janitor Chris Louis who had gone to replenish the fire. Her purse, wrist watch, and shoes were found on the floor of her basement, and burned remnants of her clothing were found in the furnace. Her heavy coat, however, was not found. Louis called the Village Marshal Barney Rosenhagen, policeman Eugene Spaid, and Dr. A.J. Rissinger. Police Chief Barney Rosenhagen reported having checked and closed the station at 9:00 p.m. the night prior and gone home; a telephone operator reported that a woman had called the station at 9:30 p.m. Elfrieda was responsive while being transported to the hospital via ambulance, but "refused to explain how or why she came to be in the basement nor how she came to be burned" to Officer Spaid who rode with her. She later told investigators that she entered through a rear door, and when she tried to leave discovered she had been locked in, leading police to believe she had already entered the building at the time Rosenhagen had closed up at 9:00 p.m. Elfrieda told Dr. A.J. Risinger and Dr. T.S. Proxmire that she did not feel pain at any time, and believed she would recover. The Chicago Tribune quoted her as saying "I did it myself. No one was with me. I did it for purity, for love." She died in Lake Forest at the Alice Home hospital at 4:00 a.m. three days later, on Friday, November 2, 1928. A reporter present at her passing claimed shortly before her death she muttered "I wonder why they did it;" upon being questioned who, she said "I don't remember." Physicians at the time of her death stated her story indicated "an acute nervous disorder." Physicians also believed she was "suffering from dementia praecox when she braved the fire." Her funeral was held Monday, November 5, 1928.

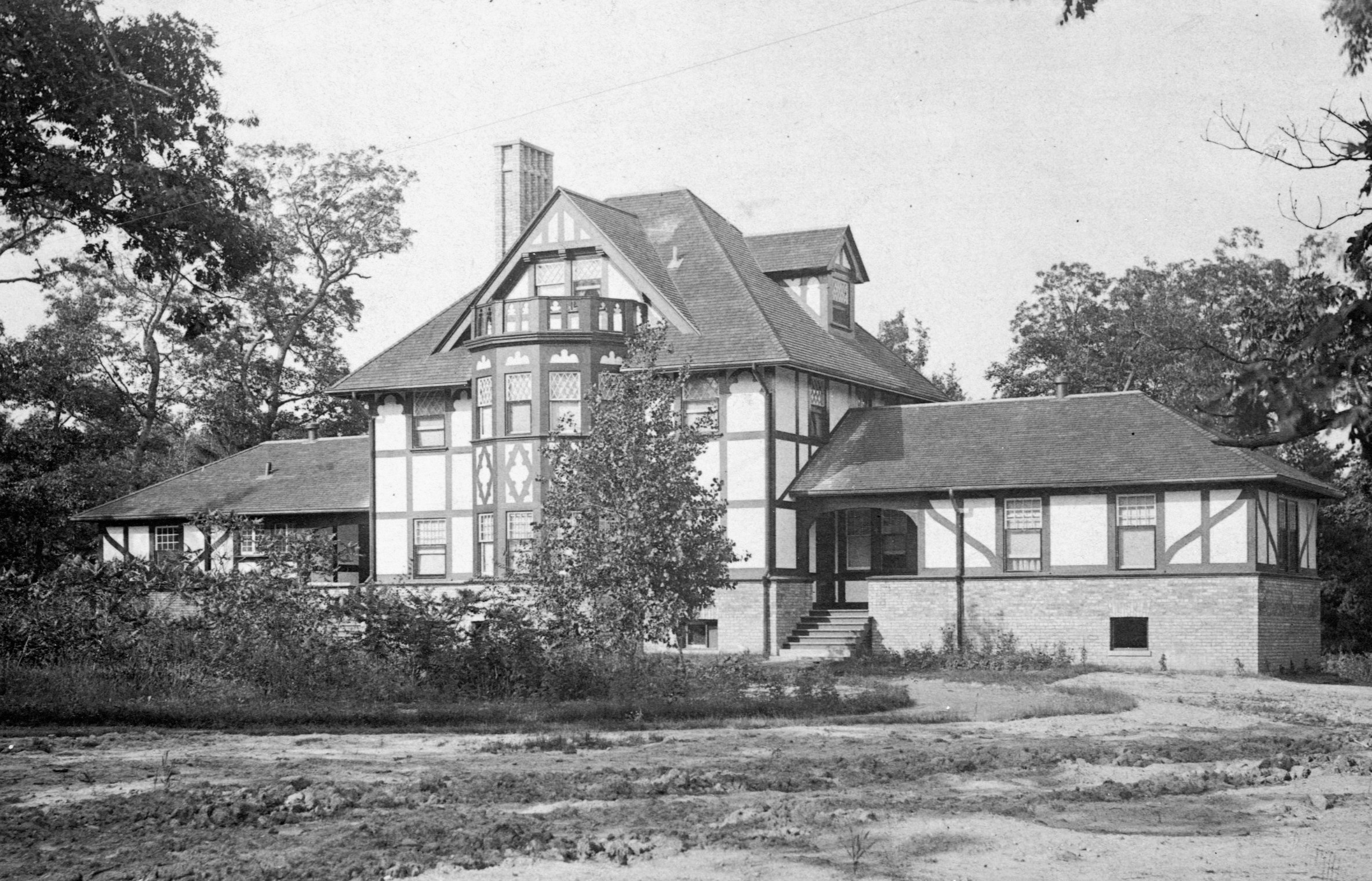
Alice Home Hospital, Lake Forest

Coroner John L. Taylor found signs of electrocution and a severe blow to the head, in addition to her burns. Lake County coroner's physician C..A. Barnes claimed she "had not been attacked nor beaten." Investigation was conducted by State Attorney A.V. Smith, Sheriff Doolittle, and Chicago's Hargraves Detective agency led by George Hargrave. One of Elfrieda's brothers gave testimony that she "told him she burned herself to prove the power of mind over matter." There were two false confessions made, one by an Army deserter from Selfridge Field, Michigan, Ezra MacVeagh, alias James Kelley, and one by letter from an anonymous self-proclaimed student of the occult; both were contradicted by the evidence. MacVeagh had been in the state asylum at Elgin, Illinois, at the time.

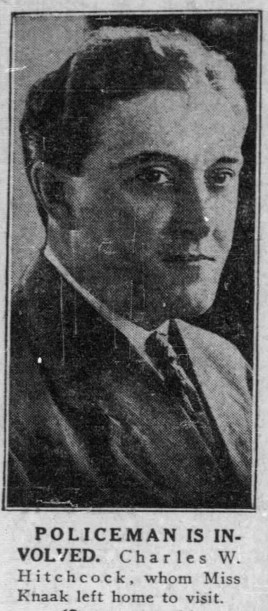
Charles W. Hitchcock

Speculation was raised about Elfrieda's relationship with fifty-two year old married father of four Night Officer Charles Webster Hitchcock (1876-1960), who also taught salesmanship, public speaking, expression at the Waukegan Y.W.C.A. Hitchcock had previously been an actor with Essanay studios, and later a vaudeville trooper. Elfrieda had studied salesmanship with Hitchcock at the Y.W.C.A. four years prior, and had since visited the police station "every two or three months to report on the progress she was making," according to Hitchcock. Elfrieda's story indicated a romantic attachment to Hitchcock; she described him as her "spiritual sweetheart," and told the doctors that her burning was "because of her faith in God and as a test of her love for a handsome married man." On Thursday, November 1, Dr. Rissinger reports her statement "we did it;" Rissinger interpreted "we" to mean herself and a "spirit." When State Attorney Smith raised the idea of arresting Hitchcock, Elfrieda was reported as responding "You would be doing a rank injustice." Hitchcock had been home with a fractured ankle from a car accident for two weeks at the time of her burning, as reported by two witnesses. Hitchcock himself did not believe she could have acted alone, stating, "The investigation on this thing ought to be pushed to the limit. It's preposterous to think that she could have done it herself." Dr. Rissinger later reported that on initially speaking with Elfrieda, she said "she had probably been burning herself all night as she fainted and fell several times," and that "she loved Policeman Hitchcock" but that night had only talked with him "spiritually." Rissinger reported that "she said Hitchcock got her out of hell three months ago, but she wouldn't explain what she meant by that. Occasionally she said something about Hitchcock going back to his wife or his wife going back to him." Hitchcock's wife Estelle Hitchcock (née Bacon) testified that she "knew nothing about the girl's attachment for the policeman, and... had been working during the evening Miss Knaak was burned."

An inquest was held on Saturday, November 10, 1928, in which a Lake County coroner's jury found that Knaak "came to her death 'by burns which appear to from the evidence to be self-inflicted.'" The coroner's jury consisted of six Lake Forest men, A. Duane Jackman, John Kreutzberg, George Anderson, H. L. Hamer, Thomas L. Eastwood, and J. E. Fitzgerald. Despite the jury's conclusion, state attorney A.V. Smith opted to keep detectives on the case. On Thursday, December 6, 1928, Elfrieda's brother Alvin Knaak announced that a special investigation financed by the Knaak family was underway, in cooperation with county authorities, stating "We believe that Elfrieda may have burned herself, but the results of our investigation thus far lead us to believe that a moral responsibility for her action rests on others. We are hoping to discover what happened between nine forty-five and midnight the night of her accident, and we are making some headway." Her sister Emily declared "It is simply impossible that she could have done such a thing - physically impossible. What happened, or how, we have no idea. We know only that she must have been slugged, or more likely drugged, and that her mind is not clear on when or why she went to Lake Bluff."

== Public reaction ==
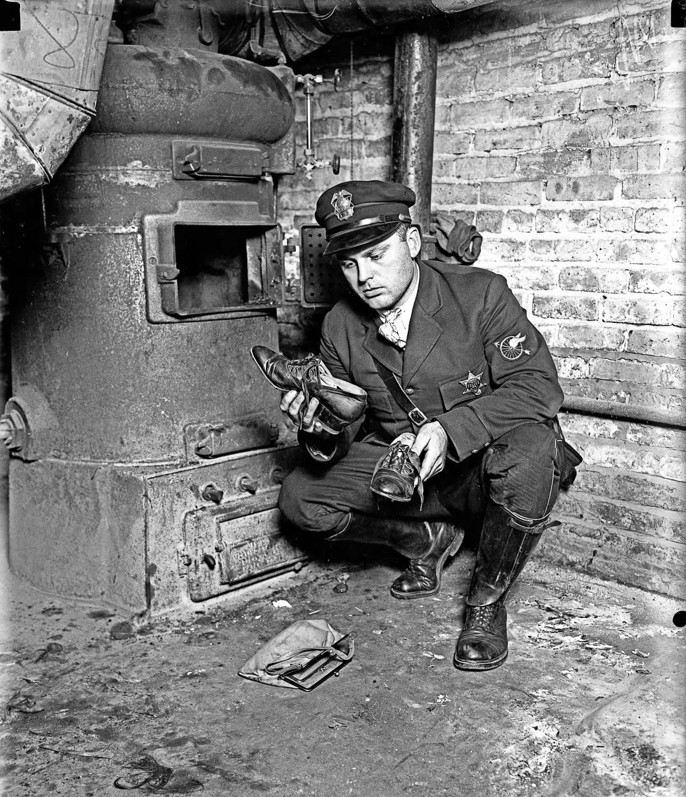
Policeman Eugene Spaid

The Chicago Tribune reported "crowds of curious sightseers" visiting the Lake Bluff village hall on Sunday, November 4, 1928, but being denied entrance to the basement where Elfrieda was fatally burned. In the two days following her discovery by Chris Louis, photographs of Elfrieda Knaak, Charles W. Hitchcock, Officer Eugene Spaid inspecting her purse and shoes next to the furnace, and the 12.75 inch by 8.75 inch furnace door itself were all published in the Chicago Tribune. The Knaak family read through her letters and diary following her death, and some entries and letters were made public. Her brother Alvin made public this diary entry: "Oct. 10. Went this P.M. without any sale. Called H. at 6 P.M. He said it seemed like three weeks and hoped I would come soon." The Saturday, November 10 inquest lasted from 9:00 a.m. to 5:00 p.m., and along with "about thirty witnesses," the investigation had "attracted a large crowd, there being over 200 persons in the courtroom during the greater portion of the day." On Friday, November 16, The Lake Forester reported that a "clue" had been found in a letter "written apparently in a feminine hand, signed "B. Lock," and mailed in Libertyville, which contains endearing terms and intimates that the writer and Miss Knaak had been on affection terms, but that the latter had 'grown cold' to their friendship." The Chicago Tribune went on to report more of this relationship, which was found to be with a woman Elfrieda had met three weeks prior while canvassing in Libertyville; her initial visit was as a book sales agent, but subsequent visits were for meals and religious discussion, and they made multiple long distance telephone calls. There was an unknown falling out and "B. Lock" wrote in one letter that Elfrieda was "forgiven but would be sorry." "B. Lock" was later identified to be Mrs. Luella Roeh, married to Libertyville contractor H.P. Roeh. Luella stated in an interview, "Fritzie came to my house to sell books Sept. 20. She seemed to like me. After her second visit I became aware of a certain power that she had over me. I liked her, too. But I felt that I was being hypnotized in a way." Luella also claimed Elfrieda told her "I am not here with you... I am in another world entirely - a spirit world." A Tuesday, November 13 Chicago Tribune story printed a quote from a book Elfrieda had annotated, Christ in You, anonymously authored and first published by Dodd, Mead & Co in 1916: "As you unfold in the consciousness of God many inexplicable things become clear. One is the purifying process of pain. It is safer and grander to suffer, because, rightly viewed, it is sure to perfect the soul. Have you not sometimes felt the shallowness and the emptiness of joy? ...This is the process called 'the refiner's fire.'" More letters and portions of Elfrieda's diary were published the week of Monday, December 3, in multiple Chicago newspapers.

== Legacy ==
Less than a month following Elfrieda's burning, on November 27, 1928, the city council discharged Chief of Police Bernard 'Barney' Rosenhagen. He was given a six month leave of absence from his other positions in town, which included superintendent of the water works, head of the street department, and poundmaster. Councilmen gave the reason that Rosenhagen was suffering from heart disease and "not able to care for his duties." Officer Spaid succeeded Rosenhagen as chief. The police committee of the city council at this time also asked for the resignation of Night Officer Charles W. Hitchcock. Just weeks later, on Monday, December 17, 1928, Rosenhagen died at home at 62 years old. His death was attributed to heart disease, but the attending physician said "criticism following the Knaak case probably had hastened his death." Less than a year later, initial suspect Charles W. Hitchcock (then employed as a bill collector) and his eighteen year old son Raymond were arrested for burglaries in Lake Bluff."

The case persisted in the public consciousness, with a London Chicago Tribune correspondent comparing a 1954 woman's burning death to Elfrieda's 1928 burning. A 2016 Chicago Tribune article by Ron Grossman, "Who Really Killed Elfrieda Knaak?" dives back into the case's details and various suspects. In July 2018, a fictionalized account of the case by Kraid Moreland and Toby Jones was published, titled The Furnace Girl: The Mysterious Case of Elfrieda Knaak. In February 2019, Chicago's WGN9 published a podcast by Larry Potash on the death of Elfrieda Knaak. In 2024, podcast Crime Junkie published an episode "Mysterious death of: Elfrieda Knaak."
