= Shields Township, Illinois =

Shields Township
- Township
- Location in Lake County

- Lake County's location in Illinois
- Coordinates: 42°16′44″N 87°51′21″W
- Country: United States
- State: Illinois
- County: Lake
- Established: November 6, 1849

Government
  - Supervisor: Gayle Stringer

Area
  - Total: 17.82 sq mi (46.2 km^{2})
  - Land: 17.80 sq mi (46.1 km^{2})
  - Water: 0.02 sq mi (0.052 km^{2}) 0.10%
- Elevation: 709 ft (216 m)

Population (2020)
  - Total: 37,685
  - Density: 2,117/sq mi (817.4/km^{2})
- Time zone: UTC-6 (CST)
  - Summer (DST): UTC-5 (CDT)
- FIPS code: 17-097-69485
- Website: www.shieldstownship.com

Shields Township is a township in Lake County, Illinois, USA. As of the 2020 census, its population was 37,685. The Naval Station Great Lakes is located in this township.

== Geography ==
According to the 2021 census gazetteer files, Shields Township has a total area of 17.82 square miles (46.15 km^{2}), of which 17.80 square miles (46.10 km^{2}) (or 99.90%) is land and 0.02 square miles (0.05 km^{2}) (or 0.10%) is water.

=== Cities and towns ===
- Lake Bluff
- Lake Forest (north half)
- North Chicago (Great Lakes Naval Base)

=== Census-designated place ===
- Knollwood (eastern half)

=== Adjacent townships ===
- Waukegan Township (north)
- Moraine Township (southeast)
- West Deerfield Township (south)
- Vernon Township (southwest)
- Libertyville Township (west)
- Warren Township (northwest)

=== Cemeteries ===
The township contains two cemeteries: Lake Forest and Saint Marys.

=== Major highways ===
- U.S. Route 41
- Illinois State Route 43
- Illinois State Route 60
- Illinois State Route 131
- Illinois State Route 137
- Illinois State Route 176

=== Airports and landing strips ===
- Lake Forest Hospital Heliport

=== Railroad lines ===
- Union Pacific North Line

== Demographics ==
As of the 2020 census there were 37,685 people, 10,203 households, and 6,351 families residing in the township. The population density was 2,115.00 inhabitants per square mile (816.61/km^{2}). There were 10,672 housing units at an average density of 598.94 per square mile (231.25/km^{2}). The racial makeup of the township was 61.00% White, 15.00% African American, 0.79% Native American, 5.19% Asian, 0.29% Pacific Islander, 10.17% from other races, and 7.55% from two or more races. Hispanic or Latino of any race were 20.16% of the population.

There were 10,203 households, out of which 29.90% had children under the age of 18 living with them, 50.68% were married couples living together, 9.02% had a female householder with no spouse present, and 37.75% were non-families. 27.80% of all households were made up of individuals, and 12.40% had someone living alone who was 65 years of age or older. The average household size was 2.48 and the average family size was 3.18.

The township's age distribution consisted of 16.3% under the age of 18, 30.8% from 18 to 24, 22.8% from 25 to 44, 17.2% from 45 to 64, and 12.9% who were 65 years of age or older. The median age was 25.8 years. For every 100 females, there were 129.0 males. For every 100 females age 18 and over, there were 137.4 males.

The median income for a household in the township was $92,183, and the median income for a family was $116,356. Males had a median income of $41,162 versus $26,983 for females. The per capita income for the township was $51,744. About 7.1% of families and 11.8% of the population were below the poverty line, including 14.1% of those under age 18 and 4.8% of those age 65 or over.

Historical population
Census	Pop.	Note	%±
2010	39,062		—
2020	37,685		−3.5%
U.S. Decennial Census
