= Lake Forest High School (Illinois) =

Public school in Lake Forest, Illinois, US

Location
- 1285 N. McKinley Rd. Lake Forest, Illinois 60045; United States; 42.263972°N 87.840687°W

Information
- School type: Public, secondary school
- Motto: Abeunt Studia in Mores (They leave, striving after morality.)
- Opened: 1935
- Status: Open
- School district: 115
- Superintendent: Matthew Montgomery
- CEEB code: 142-520
- Principal: Erin Lenart
- Faculty: 131.10 (FTE)
- Grades: 9–12
- Enrollment: 1,359 (2024–2025)
- Classes: 239
- Student to teacher ratio: 10.37
- Language: English
- Campus type: Suburban
- Colors: Royal blue and gold
- Athletics conference: North Suburban Conference
- Team name: Scouts
- Rival: Libertyville High School
- Newspaper: The Forest Scout
- Yearbook: Forest Trails
- Tuition: $24,611 (per-pupil expenditure)
- Graduates: 447 (Class of 2012)

Lake Forest High School (LFHS) is a public four-year high school located in Lake Forest, Illinois, a North Shore suburb of Chicago, Illinois, in the United States. It is the only school of Lake Forest Community High School District 115, which serves the communities of Lake Forest, Lake Bluff, Knollwood, and smaller parts of Mettawa and North Chicago. It is fed by Lake Bluff Middle School, Lake Forest Country Day School, Saint Mary's, and Deer Path Middle School.

== History ==
Lake Forest High School (LFHS) was constructed in 1935 with funds from the Works Progress Administration during the New Deal era. Designed to resemble an estate home, the building blends with the surrounding estates, giving it the appearance of a country manor rather than a traditional public school. Over the years, LFHS has undergone three significant additions, the most recent in 2008, which introduced a commons area, a new lunchroom, a music wing, and other minor improvements.

Located at 1285 N. McKinley Rd., Lake Forest, Illinois, LFHS serves the communities of Lake Forest, Lake Bluff, and Knollwood, which are northern suburbs of Chicago. The school’s West Campus is primarily dedicated to athletics and administration. Before LFHS was built, many upper-class families sent their children to boarding schools on the East Coast, while middle- and lower-class children from Lake Bluff and Lake Forest attended Deerfield High School.

== Campus ==
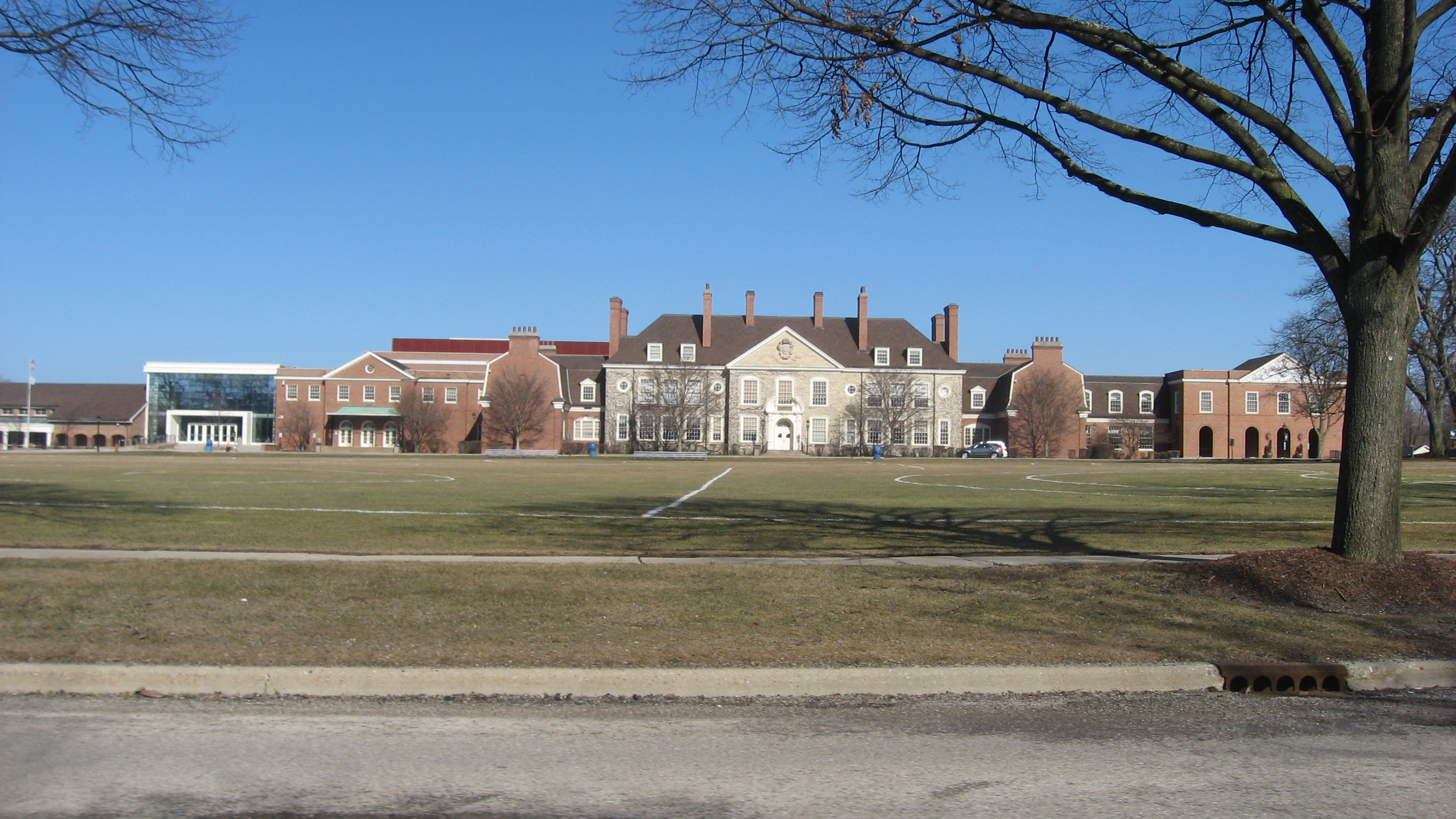
View from the west

The high school has both a studio theater and auditorium, as well as a television studio with 5,500 videotapes. It also has computer labs, a computerized library with CD-ROM retrieval, student publication facilities, photography lab, and special education facilities. Sports facilities include a field house, climbing wall, swimming pool with a diving well and student gym.

The grounds include a large front lawn (used for field hockey, lacrosse, and ultimate) and a full-sized track and football field with 2 sets of bleachers. Because the school is situated very close to residential areas, the City of Lake Forest had historically prohibited the school's football team to use floodlights, effectively prohibiting night games; however, in 2006, the city did allow the school to rent lights for a one-time night game. Following the approval of a 2007 referendum, the school's football field was relocated to the administrative West Campus, where the use of floodlights is permitted and night games can be held.

The referendum passed by an overwhelming 2/3 majority, and renovations took place in two phases. The first phase, completed during the 2007/2008 school year, included the addition of a music wing, and renovation of the west campus including construction of a Varsity field. The second phase, completed in August 2008, included academic renovations at the east campus with a brand new dining room, a large atrium or "The Commons" and library, and construction of administrative offices at the west campus, additionally at West campus a new football field complete with floodlights and astro turf was built, now allowing night games. Prior to this, a first referendum was passed on November 7, 2006 unanimously by the Lake Forest High School Board of Education. This referendum was later passed on to the rest of the community and appropriated $54 million to be paid back over the next 20 years.

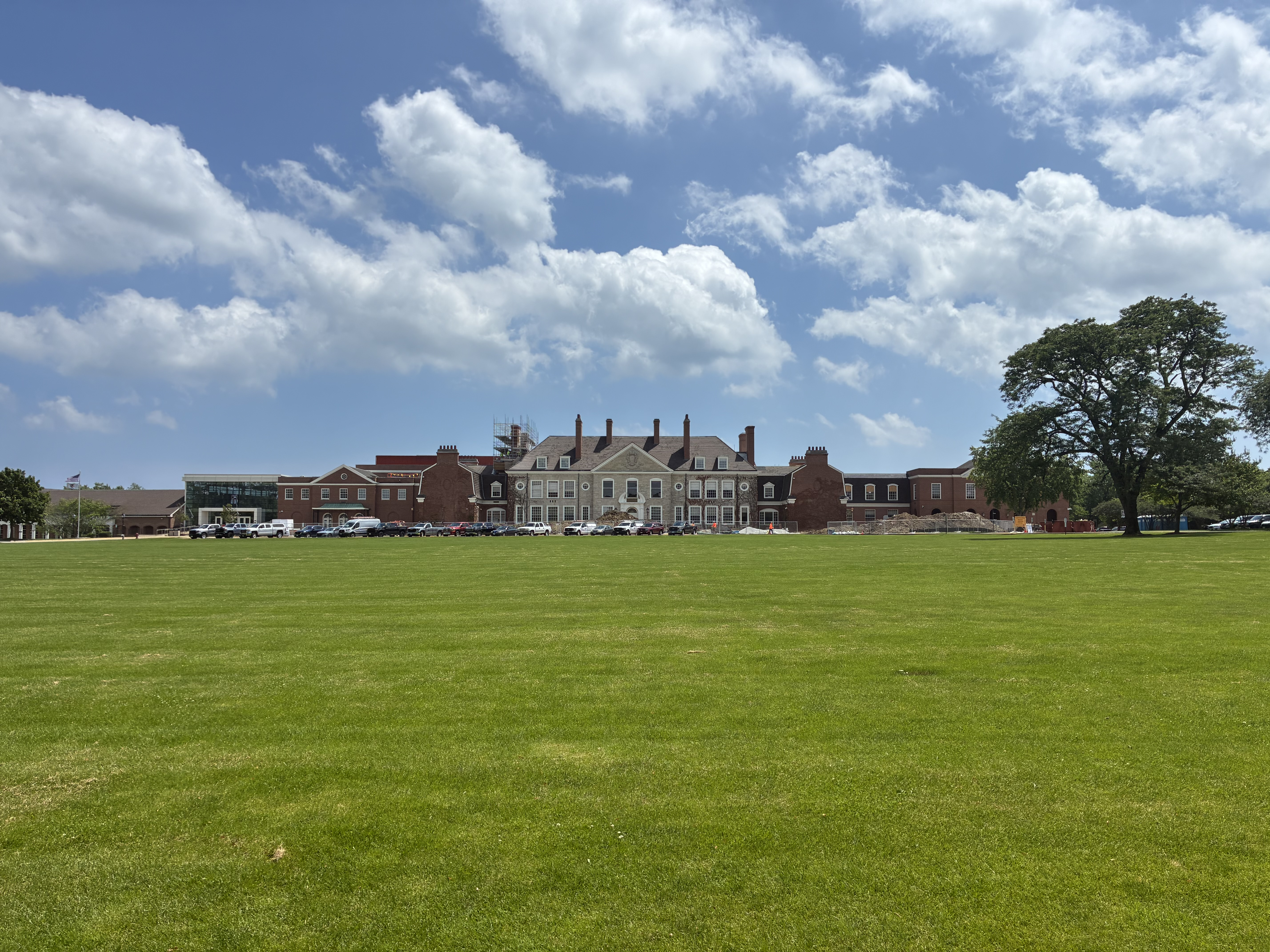
External view of Lake Forest High School during renovations in June 2026

=== April 2023 bond referendum ===
On April 4, 2023, voters in Lake Forest Community High School District 115 approved a $105.7 million bond referendum to finance major renovations and infrastructure improvements at Lake Forest High School. The referendum authorized the district to issue 20-year general obligation bonds for the repair, renovation, and modernization of the school's facilities. The measure was approved by voters in the communities of Lake Forest, Lake Bluff, and Knollwood.

The referendum was proposed following a multi-year facilities assessment that was initiated in 2018. District officials identified significant capital needs within the historic structure, which opened in 1935. Improvements planned include the replacement of aging roofing, plumbing, electrical, and HVAC systems, security upgrades, accessibility requirements under the Americans with Disabilities Act, renovations of science laboratories and classrooms, modernization of instructional technology, and the reconfiguration of student support facilities. Approximately 52% of the project's budget was designated for infrastructure improvements, and the other 48% was designated for instructional-space improvements.

== Academics ==
In 2005, Lake Forest graduated 98.9% of its senior class. It has been included in the "Top million" and "Most Successful" lists of the National Association of Secondary School Principals, The New York Times, The Washington Post, and Parade magazine. The average class size is 19.3. Lake Forest has made Adequate Yearly Progress on the Prairie State Achievement Examination, a state test part of the No Child Left Behind Act.

In 2010, Lake Forest had a mean ACT composite score of 26.5—one of the highest in the state. The national average was 21.1. SAT mean scores were 601 in Critical Reading; 621 in Math; and 594 in Writing.

The average tenure of faculty members is 11.3 years with 96% of the faculty holding a master's degree or higher. There are 156 certified staff members, creating a student to staff ratio of 12.7

Along with the typical course offerings, Lake Forest High School also covers 26 AP classes and 40 Honors classes. The Advanced Placement courses offered include: Biology, Calculus AB, Calculus BC, Chemistry, Computer Programming, Computer Science, Economics, Environmental Science, French V, French VI, German IV, Latin IV, Latin V, Literary Analysis and Criticism, Modern European History, Music Theory, Psychology, Physics C, Political Science, Spanish V, Statistics, Studio Art, United States History, and World History.

The Lake Forest High School Foundation was established in 2002 and adopted the mission statement of providing funding for resources necessary to support and enrich the educational experience of the students, faculty and staff of Lake Forest High School. This Foundation is there to provide Lake Forest High School's students and faculty with the funding they need to become more educated. The Lake Forest High School Foundation has given over 220 grants which totals to about $1,600,000.

== Athletics ==
Lake Forest High School has won 71 state championships in athletics, 43 since 2000. In their 2010–2011 season, the Scouts won three state championships. The school's Varsity Dance Team (Pom Pons) won the 2013 and 2014 Large Varsity Pom National Champions at the National Dance Team Competition. The Girls Varsity Tennis Team has won two state titles in the past three years, and the Varsity Field Hockey was state champions in 2012. The Girls Ice Hockey team won the state titles in 2011 and 2013. The 2013/14 Girl's Varsity Soccer team also won a state title in penalty kicks. The Scouts receive substantial financial support from the LFHS Booster Club.

In addition to these achievements, the Illinois High School Association (IHSA) announced that Girls Flag Football will debut an IHSA State Series in fall 2024, joining other recent additions such as Girls Wrestling (2022), Esports (2022), Boys and Girls Lacrosse (2018), and Competitive Dance (2013).

Lake Forest High School's Varsity Dance Team continued their success by taking first place overall in the 2A division at the 2024 IHSA State Championship, claiming back-to-back State Championships. In the final round, the team achieved a historic score of 98.02, the highest point total in 2A history.

Furthermore, the Lake Forest High School boys lacrosse team were crowned the 2024 Illinois state champions. Under the leadership of coach David Hone, the team completed the season with 23 wins and only three losses, finishing undefeated in conference play.

== Notable alumni ==
- Alan Benes, 1990 — Major League Baseball pitcher, 1995–2003: St. Louis Cardinals, Chicago Cubs, and Texas Rangers
- Andrew Bird, 1991 — musician
- Mat Devine — lead singer of Kill Hannah
- Caleb Durbin, 2018 — MLB infielder
- Rylie Mills, 2020 — American football defensive tackle for the Seattle Seahawks
- Dave Eggers, 1988 — writer
- William D. Eggers, 1985 — writer and consultant
- Charlie Finn — actor
- Matt Grevers, 2003 — swimmer: four-time Olympic gold medalist at the 2008 and 2012 Summer Olympics
- David Jenkins, 1999 — television writer of HBO's Our Flag Means Death
- Kai Kroeger, 2020— NFL punter for the New Orleans Saints
- David Pasquesi, 1978— actor and comedian
- Rob Pelinka, 1988 — general manager of NBA's Los Angeles Lakers
- Tommy Rees, 2010 — former American football player and current offensive coordinator for the Cleveland Browns.
- Phil Rosenthal, 1981 — columnist: Chicago Tribune
- Jenn Shapland, 2005 — writer and archivist
- Harry Shipp, 2010 — soccer player
- Jane Skinner, 1985 — television news presenter: Fox News Channel; Wife to NFL commissioner Roger Goodell
- Sarah Spain, 1998 — ESPN reporter
- Brittany "McKey" Sullivan, 2007 — winner of America's Next Top Model, Cycle 11
- Vince Vaughn, 1988 — film actor
- Catherine Warren, 2002 — Miss Illinois USA 2006
- Tim Weigel, 1963 — sportscaster

== Media references ==
The 1980 film Ordinary People is set in nearby Lake Bluff, and parts of the film were shot at the school; however all swim team scenes were filmed at nearby Lake Forest College.

An episode of the MTV series "High School Stories" focuses on students who attended Lake Forest High School.

Additionally, the school is featured prominently in various local news segments covering its academic and athletic achievements, including the recent success of the Varsity Dance Team and the boys lacrosse team’s state championship victory in 2024. These segments highlight the school’s commitment to fostering a competitive and enriching environment for its students.
