= Lake Bluff Elementary School District 65 =

School district in Illinois, United States

Coordinates: 42°16′30.1″N 87°50′40.9″W

Address
- 121 East Sheridan Place Lake Bluff, Illinois, 60044; United States

District information
- Grades: K-8
- Superintendent: Dr. Lisa Leali

Other information
- Website: Official website

Lake Bluff School District 65 is a K-8 school district located in the northern Lake County village of Lake Bluff, Illinois. The elementary school district is composed of two schools: Lake Bluff Elementary School, and Lake Bluff Middle School. Education in this district begins at Lake Bluff Elementary School, a school that covers Pre-Kindergarten through 5th grade. As of August 2025, the principal is Kellie Bae and the assistant principal is Kathleen Turner Kwak. Lake Bluff Elementary School District 65 continues through to Lake Bluff Middle School and feeds into Lake Forest High School. The Lake Bluff Middle School principal is Nathan Blackmer and the assistant principal is Joseph Jakcsy. The superintendent of the district is Dr. Lisa Leali.
