= Neighborhood park =

Parks for residential areas

Neighborhood parks, which generally range in size up to 30 acres (120,000 m^{2}), serve as a social and recreational focal points for neighborhoods and are the basic units of a park system. Many include a playground.

Neighborhood parks provide relief from the built environment for residents. They may offer a range of facilities and passive or active (programmed or unprogrammed) recreation in response to demographic and cultural characteristics of surrounding neighborhoods, with opportunities for interaction with nature. Neighborhood parks are largely accessible by foot, bicycle, or public transit within at least a quarter-mile radius from residences, providing easy access especially for children and senior adults.

Types of neighborhood parks include mini-parks, or pocket parks, and may be further described by their predominant recreational offering. They may provide greenscape, recreation centers, sports fields, or playgrounds. A greenscape is a landscaped park, often with a large un-programmed lawn, primarily for passive recreation. A recreation center is a facility that supports myriad park activities, including sports and other recreational activities appropriate to the population or community that uses the park. Pocket parks are the smallest in size, designed to serve the immediate surrounding neighborhood. Generally, size limits the ability to serve multiple recreational functions.

Many park systems are underfunded and rely upon grassroots neighborhood-park groups and associations. Many of these groups join together in broad coalitions to advocate for better park maintenance and government accountability.

== Location and access ==
A neighborhood park should be centrally located, if possible, within its service area and should be uninterrupted by non-residential roads or other physical barriers. The site should be generally flat and usable. It should be accessible by way of interconnecting trails, public transportation, sidewalks, or low-volume residential streets.

A neighborhood park primarily serves residents within about 1/4 mile of the park, without physical or social barriers to the boundaries.

Ease of access from the surrounding neighborhood, central location, and linkage to greenways are key concerns when selecting a new park site. The site itself should allow active and passive recreation uses. Since one of the primary reasons people go to a park is to experience a pleasant outdoor environment, the site should exhibit some innate aesthetic qualities. "Left-over" parcels of land that are undesirable for development are not generally desirable for neighborhood parks.

The expressed wishes of nearby residents should guide the development or redevelopment plans for each park. Creating a sense of place by bringing together the unique characteristics of the site with the vision of the neighborhood is vital.

== Amenities ==
=== Essential ===
- Park signage (park name and relevant code signage)
- Turf area
- Perennial beds
- Benches
- Paths
- Dog bag dispensary and signage
- Trash can
- Trees
- Opportunity for at least one active use

=== Ideal ===
- Flower beds
- Lighting
- Informational kiosk
- Bathrooms
- Barbecue grills and picnic area
- Drinking Fountain
- Trash receptacles, including recycling bins
- Lighting
- Bicycle parking
- Public art
- Recreation Center
- Clubhouse
- Swimming pool
- Children's play area
- Athletic fields and courts
- Trails
- Reserved open space
