= Pentecostalism in South Africa =

Pentecostalism began spreading in South Africa after William J. Seymour, of the Azusa Street mission, sent missionaries to convert and organize missions. By the 1990s, approximately 10% of the population of South Africa was Pentecostal. The largest denominations were the Apostolic Faith Mission, Assemblies of God, and the Full Gospel Church of God. Another 30% of the population was made up of mostly black Zionist and Apostolic churches, which comprise a majority of South Africa's African Instituted Churches(AICs). In a 2006 survey, 1 in 10 urban South Africans said they were Pentecostal, and 2 in 10 said they were charismatic. In total, renewalists comprised one-fourth of the South African urban population. A third of all protestants surveyed said that they were Pentecostal or charismatic, and one-third of all South African AIC members said they were charismatic.

== History ==
=== Early 20th Century ===
In 1895, John Alexander Dowie established a church in Johannesburg. Eventually this joins with the Christian Catholic Church in Zion. In 1904 a missionary from Dowie's Zion City was sent to oversee this church consisting of around 5,000 members who were mostly Zulus.

In 1908, Thomas Hezmalhalch and John Lake, along with others, from William Seymour's Azusa Street Mission went to South Africa to convert and organize missions. Seymour decided to send missionaries to South Africa because a reader of Seymour's Apostolic Faith newsletter responded inviting Azusa missionaries to South Africa. This mission was well received as South Africans were predisposed to pentecostal ideas such as Speaking in Tongues, Spirit Healing and the Holy Spirit from previous missions done by Holiness missionaries as well as John Alexander Dowie's Zion City. John Lake, who was also an elder in Zion City, helped bridge the two missions together and partnered with Afrikaner Pieter Le Roux to establish the Apostolic Faith Mission of South Africa in October 1913. Seymour's Pentecostal vision was not always well received in South Africa because Seymour's missionaries promoted the idea of social equality between the white South Africans and the native black South Africans, which the white South Africans disagreed with. The issue of racial segregation created a few breakaway churches from the Apostolic Faith Mission of South Africa, the Catholic Apostolic Holy Spirit Church in Zion, created in 1910, Zion Apostolic Faith Mission, created in 1920, which later in 1925, split into the Zion Christian Church which is the largest South African church today. Seymour's missionary work in South Africa caused Pieter Le Roux, an Afrikaner Pastor, to adopt the Pentecostal message and spread it through native black South Africans and eventually through Zionist Pentecostalism and into African Instituted Churches.

Rodney Smith, a white South African, read about Pentecostal beliefs and the Azusa revival in William Seymour's Apostolic Faith newsletter. Smith wrote about how he wanted to receive the Spirit Baptism, so when Lake and the other Azusa missionaries arrived in South Africa, he received his Spirit Baptism. Smith and another Azusa missionary, Henry Turney, organised to create a work that eventually became the Assemblies of God in Cape Town and Johannesburg. Turney, who received his Spirit Baptism in 1906 at Azusa Street, played a large part in this missionary work. He partnered with eleven missionaries and eventually began ministering in Pretoria in 1909. By 1911 they created another mission in Transvaal which in 1917 became a part of the Assemblies of God.

In September 1909, two evangelists from Pieter Le Roux's church walked from Wakkerstroom to Johannesburg where they held meetings with the Zulus. Many people at these meetings were saved and sixteen received their Spirit Baptism. There were reports of an unnamed evangelist raising up to four people from the dead while at the meetings, causing the meetings to completely fill the building they were held in. While these claims may not be true, they were extremely important in promoting and spreading Pentecostalism throughout the native population.

By October 1909 revivals were in full swing in Johannesburg, Cape Colony, Doornfontein, and Pretoria. Many were reported being saved, healed, and receiving their Spirit Baptism. In Johannesburg, Pentecostals were evangelizing workers in the Diamond Mines and inmates in local jails, totaling about 250,000 South Africans. Within a few years, there were more than 250 native black Pentecostal preachers, 12 ordained ministers, and 6 places of worship.

=== Mid-20th Century ===
In 1932, the South African branch of the Assemblies of God separated from the American branch. The South African branch of the Assemblies of God was unique in that during the Apartheid-era, they avoided racial segregation, though they were still divided into different associations that reflected the racial differences. These associations were reunited in 2002 to form one of the largest Classical Pentecostal denominations in South Africa.

During this time, the majority of white Pentecostals supported apartheid or remained apolitical. One of the country's biggest Pentecostal denominations, The Apostolic Faith Mission, had an all-white leadership council. Many white church leaders at this time were a part of the apartheid-era government, such as Gerrie Wessels, who was a senator of the National Party in 1955 and served as vice-president for the Apostolic Faith Mission until 1969. Black Pentecostal leaders during this time usually tended to avoid political involvement. Nicholas Bhengu, a prominent leader of the Assemblies of God in the 1950s, condemned political involvement, even considering it to be un-Christian. He created a "Back to God Crusade" where he emphasised restoring black dignity and fighting crime while staying out of politics.Bhengu’s friend Edgar M. Louton was later forced to cut ties with the Assemblies of God because of his criticism of Apartheid.

=== Late 20th Century ===
In the 1970s and 80s, there was rapid growth in neo-Pentecostal churches such as the Rhema Church, and Durban Christian Center. Ray McCauley was the country's most important white neo-Pentecostal leader. He was the founder of the Rhema Church in 1979, and the president of the International Fellowship of Christian Churches in 1985, which is the country's largest association of Charismatic and neo-Pentecostal churches.

in 1994, the African Christian Democratic Party was founded by Pentecostals and evangelicals with focus on opposition to abortion and homosexuality. In 1994, Kenneth Meshoe, a pastor of the Pentecostal Hope of Glory Tabernacle, was elected to parliament. Eventually, other Pentecostal leaders such as Ray McCauley and Frank Chikane criticized the party for their focus on being conservative.

In 1996, the two, previously separate black and white, branches of the Apostolic Faith Mission reunited. At the celebration, the president of the church, Isak Burger, apologized to Chikane for the sins of the church during the apartheid era. Later on that year, Chikane was elected as vice president of the church and in 1997, elected to the National Executive of the ANC, and then in 1999, became the director-general for the office of President Thabo Mbeki.

By 2006, four members of the African Christian Democratic Party are members of parliament, including Pentecostal pastor Meshoe.

==== Apartheid and Pentecostalism ====
Apartheid was a system in South Africa, put in place around 1948 by the newly elected white Afrikaner National Party, which legally enforced segregation.

During the apartheid era, many Pentecostal leaders tried to stay out of politics. But a few, mostly black, Pentecostal leaders became politically active to fight apartheid. Such as Frank Chikane, a black Pentecostal member of the Apostolic Faith Mission, who joins the Student Christian Movement in the 1970s to help guide them towards political activism. Between 1977 and 1982, Chikane was arrested four times. During one of these, he was interrogated and tortured by a member of his own church. In 1981, Chikane was suspended by the Apostolic Faith Mission and was not reinstated until 1990. In 1987, Chikane became the general secretary of the South African Council of Churches where he serves as mediator between the government and the African National Congress (ANC).

In 1985, Chikane and a group of other anti-apartheid church leaders create a group called Concerned Evangelicals. Concerned Evangelicals published papers denouncing apartheid, including the Kairos Document in 1985, and the Evangelical Witness in South Africa in 1986, of which, half of the signers were Pentecostal. in 1988, a Pentecostal organization called the Relevant Pentecostal Witness published an anti-apartheid paper and in 1994, these two organizations join to form The Evangelical Alliance of South Africa.

Ray McCauley of the mostly white, neo-Pentecostal Rhema Church, starts becoming involved in politics near the end of apartheid. in 1990, McCauley and representatives from 97 other churches sign the anti-apartheid Rustenburg Declaration. In 1991, McCauley and Chikane serve on the National Peace Accord.

== Churches ==
=== Apostolic Faith Mission ===
The Apostolic Faith Mission began in 1908 when John Lake and Thomas Hezmalhalch came from William Seymour's Azusa Street Mission to convert in South Africa. The Apostolic Faith Mission grew quickly, but soon became racially segregated. In 1996 the two racially segregated branches reunited to form one of the biggest denominations in South Africa.

=== South African Assemblies of God ===
The Assemblies of God is the largest Pentecostal denomination in the world. In 1908, missionaries arrived in South Africa from William Seymour's Azusa Street mission. Some of these missionaries organized a group that would eventually grow to becoming a part of the Assemblies of God. By 1936 this branch of the Assemblies of God was a mostly black denomination. The Assemblies of God preach of Healing, miracles, as well as the holy spirit baptism, like many other Pentecostal denominations. One major difference from other Pentecostal denominations is that the Assemblies of God believe in the Trinity, that people should be baptised "in the name of the father, the son, and the holy spirit", rather than being Oneness, where you are baptised in the name of Jesus.

=== Full Gospel Church of God in South Africa (Volle Evangelie Kerk Van Suid-Afrika... before 2005) ===
In 1909, George Bowie was sent by the Bethel Pentecostal Assembly to South Africa. In 1910 the Pentecostal mission began. This would eventually become the Full Gospel Church of God in South Africa. The Full Gospel Church of God teach of integrity, prophecy, empowering members and leaders to operate within biblical standards, and are contemporary yet remain faithful to their Pentecostal origins.

=== The Universal Church of the Kingdom of God ===
The Universal Church of the Kingdom of God(UCKG) was established in 1977 in Brazil and began spreading to Africa in the 1990s. The UCKG, led by Edir Macedo, sent missionaries to most countries within Africa, as well as many outside. The first bishop to be sent to South Africa, Marcelo Crivella, which was near the end of apartheid, preached of equality between the whites and blacks. South Africa is among the few countries in Africa where the UCKG succeeded the most. The UCKG preaches about prosperity, exorcisms, and healing which form the basis for their faith.
