= Apostolic Faith Mission =

Apostolic Faith Mission is the name of several Pentecostal congregations and denominations, and may refer to:

- Apostolic Faith Mission (Brooklyn), New York City
- Apostolic Faith Mission of South Africa
- Apostolic Faith Mission Church of God, Mobile, Alabama, U.S.
- Former name of the Apostolic Faith Church, Eugene, Portland, U.S.

== Historical ==
- Apostolic Faith Mission of Los Angeles, California, home to the Azusa Street Revival; see Peniel Mission
- Apostolic Faith Mission of Australasia, the first Pentecostal organization in Australia, succeeded by the Assemblies of God in Australia
- Apostolic Faith Mission in China (使徒信心會), a loose organization of American Pentecostal missionaries; see Zhang Lingsheng

== See also ==
- Zion Apostolic Faith Mission Church, Zimbabwe
