= Samuel Mutendi =

Zimbabwean church leader (c. 1880–1976)

Bishop Samuel Mutendi (c.1880-1976) was the founder of the Zimbabwean based Zion Christian Church (Z.C.C), which under his leadership grew to a membership of more than 250,000, and is believed to have grown three or four times larger today and one of the largest religious organizations in the country. As the religious leader responsible for the popularization of Zionist Christianity into Zimbabwe, he is arguably the most influential religious personality in the country's history.

== Early years and religious calling ==
Mutendi was born in the Bikita region of Zimbabwe, apparently to a family descended from the Rozvi royal line. Before the late 1920s he went by his birth name of Samuel Moyo, but later changed it to Mutendi as his stature as a leader was increasing. According to autobiographical sections of his sacred writings, Rungano Rwa Zion Christian Church, Mutendi was born prematurely and was expected to die. The name "Mutendi" is a shortened colloquial reference to his eyes opening after being left for dead by his family members.

Mutendi was literate even though he never attended school. He was taught to read and write by a male relative. In his early adulthood he took a job with the British South Africa Police and was stationed at Chegutu. According to the Rungano, Mutendi was visited by the Angel Gabriel in 1913 at a time when he was not religious. Further visions, especially after 1919, encouraged him to seek a religious path and foretold his rise as a religious leader. In the early 1920s Mutendi quit his police job and returned to Bikita, where he joined the local Dutch Reformed Church mission. Mutendi felt compelled to preach as a layman, but his accounts of his visions and his calls for converts to experience "fire baptism" were unacceptable in the conservative DRC. During this time, three acquaintances of Mutendi's ventured to South Africa as migrant workers, and were converted to Zionist Christianity in the Transvaal. Mutendi then heard of his friends' experiences, and went to South Africa himself with a colleague named Andreas Shoko. During their time in the Transvaal, Mutendi and Shoko were baptized by Engenas Lekganyane.

Around 1923, Mutendi returned to Bikita as a ZCC member and began preaching. In early 1925 was part of a delegation that unsuccessfully sought to register the church with the South African government. Following the secession, Mutendi led the Zimbabwean branch of the ZCC until his death fifty years later.

Although Mutendi's biography is well known, it has recently been questioned as new documentation has come to light. In particular, it appears that he was never a member of the Zion Apostolic Faith Mission before he joined the ZCC as he claimed. As a result of this and other disparities, his life story is not clear-cut.

== Growth of the Zion Christian Church ==
Mutendi's new church faced considerable difficulties in its first decade or two. Due to the system of indirect rule, it was opposed by both the White authorities and the chiefs who they ruled the reserves through. Mutendi was unable to register the church in his own country, and faced considerable persecution during his evangelizing tours. According to the Rungano, many of his adherents' churches and schools were burned down, while he was arrested and imprisoned on numerous occasions. In some areas his followers were forced to conduct their services in secret in places such as caves.

Over time Mutendi's reputation as a faith healer, rain maker, and a man of immense spiritual power grew. He walked around with a large entourage that proclaimed his deeds. During his itinerant tours, Mutendi carried a "spriritual rod" named "Mapumhangozi" that was supposedly blessed by Engenas Lekganyane. This rod was used to heal the sick and to effectuate other miracles. Due to these successes Mutendi was able to win the support of a number of chiefs and thus to begin operating more in the open without fear of arrest. Eventually, after years of suppression, the government issued what Mutendi called a "Peace Order". People with illnesses or other issues began to venture from far and wide to seek his counsel and intervention.

After the nearly simultaneous death of Engenas Lekganyane and the beginning of apartheid in South Africa, Mutendi's branch of the ZCC became increasingly distinct from the main South African branch. Prior to 1948 Zimbabweans could travel freely to South Africa to visit the ZCC's two annual pilgrimages. The apartheid government's new travel requirements rendered these pilgrimages, as well as other contacts, far more difficult. Another bone of contention was that Mutendi did not condone ancestor worship, as did the parent South African church. Further there were administrative difficulties at Bikita arising from an illicit relationship which the Moria Zion City in South Africa was supposed to address but was not resolved. This led to the break away - Samuel Mutendi setting his base - while Jorum Jaboon was installed by Engnas Lekanyane as the new leader of Z.C.C in Rhodesia. In the early 1950s Mutendi built his own "Zion City" near Bikita and erected his headquarters there. This site became the new pilgrimage site for Zimbabwean ZCC members. As a result of the new reality, Mutendi wrote his sacred text, the Rungano Rwa Zion Christian Church, which included a new constitution that made it distinct from the Lekganyane ZCC. Mutendi also began to mandate the use of different sorts of sacred clothing by his members. Over the decades, Mutendi's organization continued to grow and evolved into Zimbabwe's largest church.

== Death ==
Mutendi had a large family, and two of his sons, Ruben and Nehemiah, vied for the leadership of the ZCC following his death in 1976. Reuben Mutendi (1934-2010) was eventually installed as the new Bishop of ZCC BY laying of hands by David Masuka as enshrined in the 1949 covenant between Mutendi, Masuka and Andreas Shoko after internal an internal power struggle with his brother Nehemiah who had support of the family members because of his better education as compared to Reuben. Reuben then decided to relocate to Bikita district and built his headquarters at Mandadzaka in Masvingo Province. He died in 2010 and his son Makuwa Mutendi succeeded him as the new zcc leader. Nehemiah Mutendi (1939) with the support of his brothers and a senior ZCC Minister Champion Gwande who carried a campaign throughout the country, was eventually appointed as the new Bishop of the other ZCC Under his control the ZCC grew and since then has spread rapidly across the world following the post-2000 Zimbabwean diaspora.,
