= Zion Apostolic Faith Mission Church =

Zionist sect in southern Africa

The Zion Apostolic Faith Mission Church is one of the earliest Zionist sects in southern Africa. It was formed out of a secession from the Pentecostal Apostolic Faith Mission in 1919, and attempted to create southern Africa's second "Zion City" in emulation of John Alexander Dowie. Although ZAFM was initially an influential church in Zionist circles, it failed to develop and prosper over the decades. It is best known today for spawning two secessions of its own that grew into large churches—the Zion Christian Church and the Zimbabwean Zion Apostolic Faith Mission.

== Edward Lion and the Founding of the Zion Apostolic Faith Mission ==
Edward Lion (d. 1938) founded ZAFM in 1919 as a secession from the White-led Apostolic Faith Mission of South Africa. Lion was an early convert to Zionist Christianity, having joined John Alexander Dowie's organization around 1905 soon after leaving his native Lesotho. After the formation of the Pentecostal movement and the Apostolic Faith Mission, Lion joined this movement and was groomed as a leader by its President John G Lake. After earlier being ejected from Lesotho by irate citizens, Lion established a successful Lesotho branch of the AFM in 1912.

During the 1912-19 period Lion became famous for conducting faith healings. He is said to have healed numerous lepers, and to have been visited by the afflicted from far and wide. During these years he chafed under White control and became increasingly independent, although he still received a salary and other support from the AFM. In 1919, however, a Sotho Chief who he had converted gave him a large block of communal land at a place called Kolonyama. Lion then seceded from the AFM and named his new church the Zion Apostolic Faith Mission. He renamed Kolonyama "Zion City" and encouraged his followers to join him there. By the early 1920s he had several hundred followers in residence, although he claimed almost one hundred congregations in southern Africa.

Other than Lion, the most famous ZAFM member was Engenas Lekganyane. Lekganyane, who had spent some years with Lion in Boksburg before 1912 as a fellow member of an AFM congregation, ventured to Kolonyama in 1920 and joined ZAFM with several hundred Transvaal-based members. Lion in turn made Lekganyane his Transvaal leader. Around 1923, Lekganyane converted two Zimbabwean migrant workers, namely Samuel Mutendi and Andreas Shoko, in Pretoria, South Africa. Although Mutendi himself did not join ZAFM, Andreas Shoko did. He remained with the organization for eight years in South Africa, before returning to Zimbabwe in 1931 to lead its branch there.

== ZAFM Under Lion ==
Edward Lion's leadership of ZAFM was an extremely rocky period of time. Following his shift to his new Zion City, he proclaimed himself the "Brother of Jesus" and promised his followers fortune and power due to their positions as "first apostles". His followers, who included a number of runaway wives, practiced free love. Lion himself introduced the concept of "sexual confession", through which all women in the church were expected to sleep with him at certain times. These practices led to his expulsion from the Apostolic Faith Mission in 1923, and also annoyed local chiefs in his vicinity. Lion was eventually charged and convicted for seducing and impregnating young women in his church. After serving a prison sentence, he was expelled from Basutoland and ZAFM was banned until 1945.

Lion was forced to try and reconstruct the church in the late 1920s and early 1930s as a result of his expulsion. He sought to purchase freehold land in the Transvaal as a means of creating a new Zion City, and his church elders encouraged male ZAFM members to take contracts on the mines in order to raise funds for land purchases. These efforts met with varying success, in particular since some members had their earnings forcibly garnished at the end of their contracts. Nevertheless, Lion was able to buy and register several small pieces of land north of Pretoria that became his new headquarters. Before this land-owning project could be furthered more, Lion died in 1938 and was succeeded as ZAFM leader by his son Solomon (1908–87).

ZAFM was not able to grow substantially after World War II as did other large Zionist sects. Its core base at Wallmansthal, north of Pretoria, was too small and crowded to accommodate further growth, and so the membership was scattered. The organization seems to have been overshadowed by Engenas Lekganyane's 1925 offshoot, the Zion Christian Church, which developed into southern Africa's largest and wealthiest religious movement.

== The Zimbabwean ZAFM Section ==
The ZAFMC was founded by Bishop Andreas Pedzisai Shoko in 1931 as one of the earlier independent churches in Zimbabwe.

Shoko was born in Museva village of Chief Gororo's area and was educated by the Dutch Reformed Church (DRC) . He worked as a school teacher at the Zunga School and as a herd boy at Peter Forrestal who was the Native Commissioner at the time. Shoko ventured to South Africa with Samuel Mutendi in 1923 to seek migrant work and joined ZAFM in Pretoria.

After Engenas Lekganyane left ZAFM in 1925, Shoko remained with church, met Edward Lion, and on his return to Chivi in 1931 was appointed the Zimbabwean church leader. Over time, Shoko's branch of ZAFM would have far more members than the South African mother church.

Shoko held open meetings and baptized all those that believed in his teachings. His original way of relating the gospel symbolically attracted many. The colonial administration viewed Andreas’ church as a threat and they teamed up with the local chiefs and headmen to condemn his activities. Andreas became powerful and influential that the local chiefs requested that his activities be banned. He was detained several times at Chibi. Native Board meetings were held in 1933 and 1936 at Chibi and Fort Victoria (Now Masvingo) respectively to discuss Andreas’ issue. Andreas turned into a jail-bird . He was detained at the Chibi BSAP cells many times and was deported to his home whenever spotted preaching in areas away from his Chibi home.

Andreas established his church's headquarters at Museva and he preached the gospel for five decades. To avoid succession disputes after his death, Andreas anointed his son Dorias in 1955 in the presence of the then high priests and amongst them were Tapson Kandros Mawisire, Erivanos Makhadho and S Mabhigiri. Bishop Andreas Pedzisai Shoko died in 1985 and his son Dorias succeeded him as Bishop Andreas II.

The church established branches in Zambia, South Africa and all the provinces of Zimbabwe under his leadership. He also managed to finish the construction the church that was started by his father at Museva. Bishop Andrias II died in October 2012 and was succeeded by his son Ezra, who was anointed in December 2013. In 2013, one of Bishop Dorias’ sons by the name Jameson led a schism with the help of Bishops Makuva Mutendi, Tafirenyika Masuka and the controversial Johannes Ndanga.
