= Shuping =

Shuping may refer to:

== People ==
=== Given name ===
- Deng Shuping (Chinese: 邓蜀平; 1913–1967), Chinese politician
- Jing Shuping (Chinese: 经叔平; 1918–2009), Chinese businessman
- Tan Shuping (Chinese: 谈舒萍; born 1978), Chinese diver
- Shuping Wang (Chinese: 王淑平; 1959–2019), Chinese-American medical researcher
- Shuping Yang (Chinese: 杨舒平; fl. 2017), Chinese student who graduated from the University of Maryland in 2017
- Zhan Shuping (Chinese: 展淑萍; born 1964), Chinese basketball player
- Zhi Shuping (Chinese: 支树平), Chinese politician

=== Surname ===
- Oleseng Shuping (1963–2010), South African gospel singer

== Places in Mainland China ==
- Shuping, Hongjiang (Chinese: 熟坪乡), township in Hongjiang, Huaihua, Hunan
- Shuping, Zhaojue County (Chinese: 树坪乡), former township in Zhaojue County, Liangshan Yi Autonomous Prefecture, Sichuan
- Shuping Subdistrict (Chinese: 舒坪街道), subdistrict in Ziliujing District, Zigong, Sichuan

== Other uses ==
- Shuping Scholarship, privately-funded scholarship in China
