= African Zionism =

Religious movement in Southern Africa

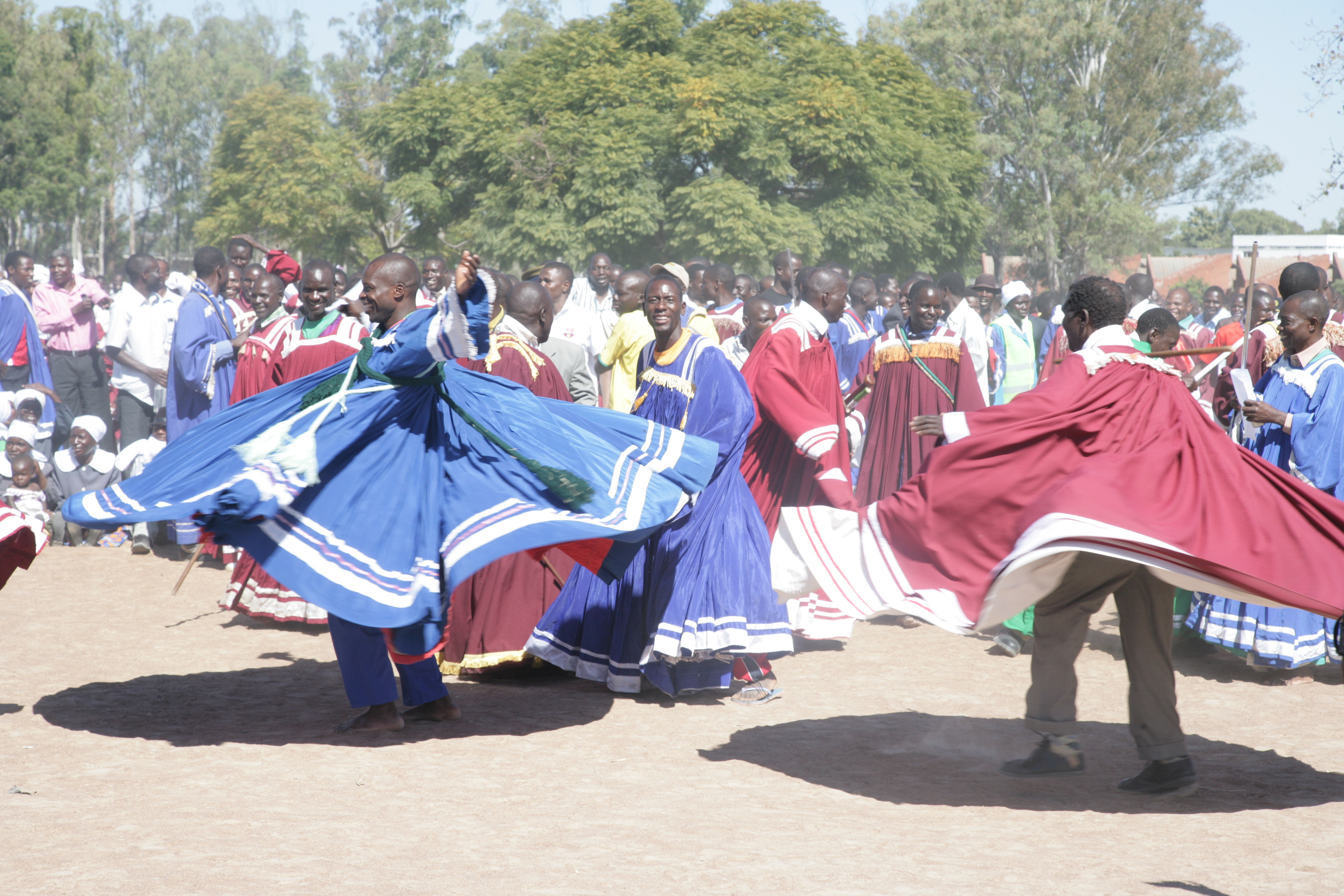
Zion congregants dancing to the drums and singing in Harare (Zimbabwe).

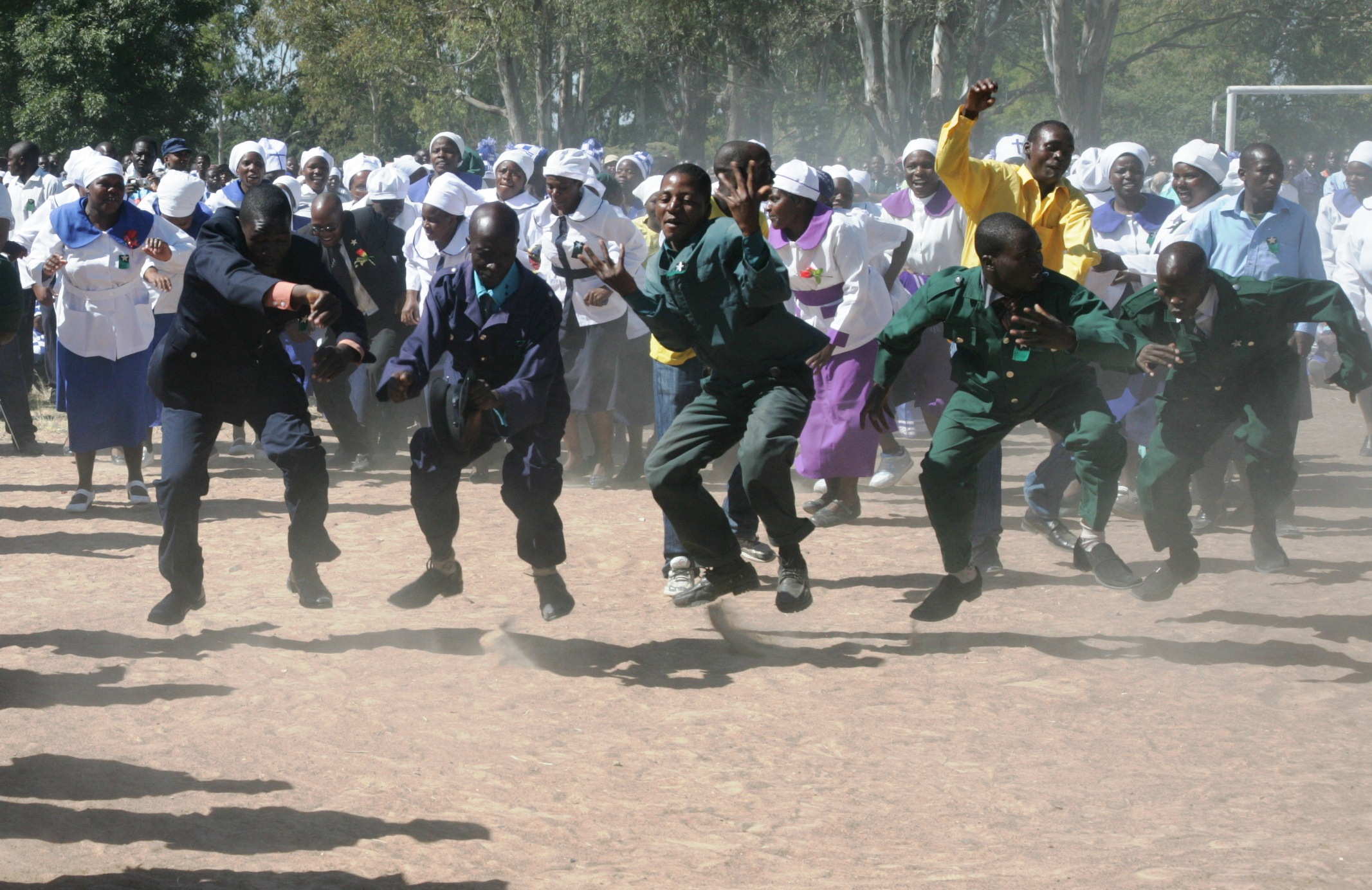
Zion dancers in Harare.

African Zionism (also "amaZioni" from Zulu "people of Zion") is a religious movement with 15–18 million members throughout Southern Africa, making it the largest religious movement in the region. It is a combination of Christianity and African traditional religion. Zionism is the predominant religion of Eswatini and forty percent of Swazis consider themselves Zionist. It is also common among Zulus in South Africa. The amaZioni are found in South Africa, Eswatini, Mozambique, Malawi, Zimbabwe, Botswana, and Namibia. A large organization within this movement is the Zion Christian Church.

== History ==
The Zionist churches of southern Africa were founded by Pieter Louis Le Roux, an Afrikaner faith healer. He was a former member of the Dutch Reformed Church who joined John Alexander Dowie's Christian Catholic Church based in Zion, Illinois. In 1903 Dowie sent a Daniel Bryant to South Africa to work alongside Le Roux. In 1908 Daniel Nkonyane became the leader of the church. By the 1920s the church in Africa was entirely separated from its American version. In the mid-1980s the church in Zion, Illinois (now called Christ Community Church) began reestablishing a connection with the Zion movement in Southern Africa. The church works through an agency called Zion Evangelical Ministries of Africa or ZEMA. In South Africa, churches were established at Wakkerstroom and Charlestown on the Transvaal-Natal border.

== Practices ==
Zionism blends traditional Southern African beliefs with faith healing and water baptism. Some members wear white robes and carry staffs.
