= African-initiated church =

Independent Christian church

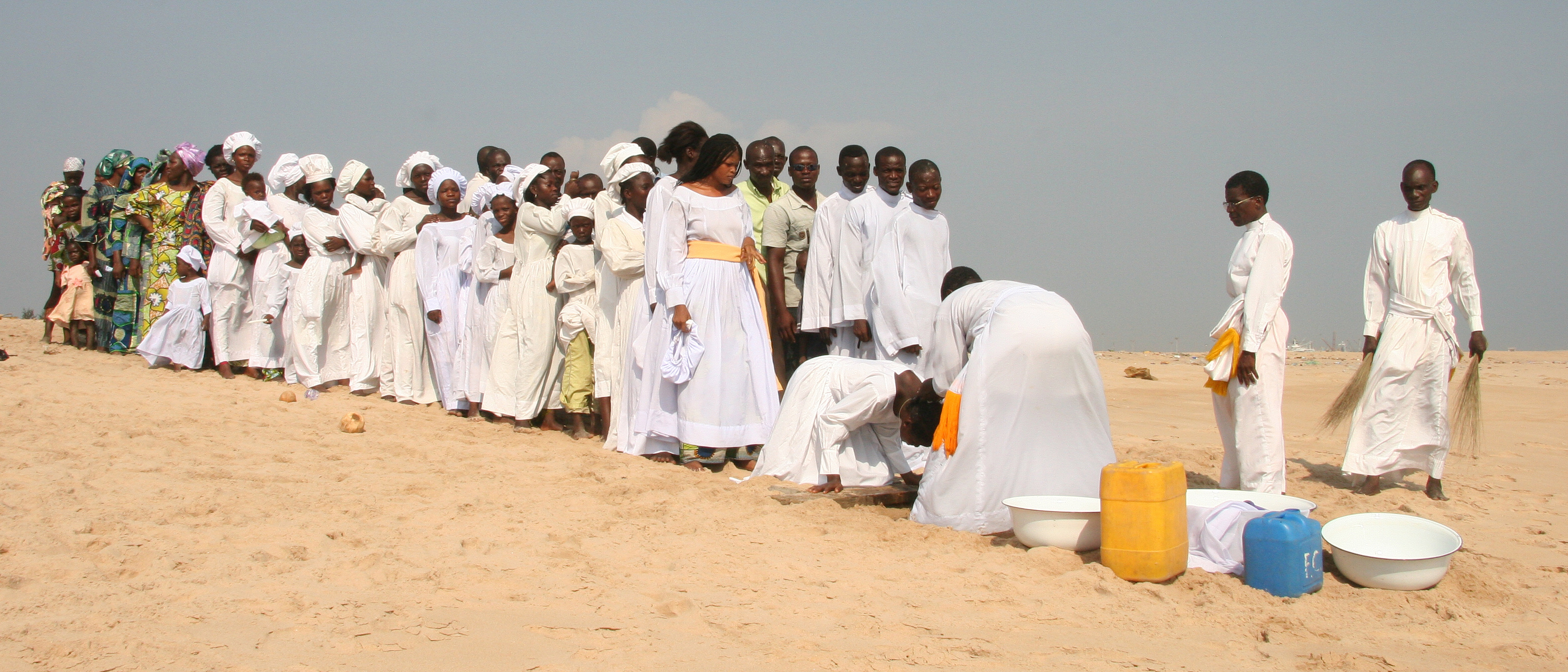
"Spiritual headwashing" in Cotonou, Benin. Celestial Church of Christ is a religion which started in Benin in the middle of the 20th century by Samuel Joseph Biléou Oschoffa

An African-initiated church (AIC) is a Christian church independently started in Africa by Africans rather than chiefly by missionaries from another continent.

== Nomenclature ==
A variety of overlapping terms exist for these forms of Christianity: African-initiated churches, African independent churches, African indigenous churches, and African-instituted churches. (Note: Philomena Njeri Mwaura wrote: These African responses to Christianity have been described variously as African initiatives in Christianity, African Independent, African Indigenous, African Initiated or African Instituted Churches. The term "African Independent" indicates that these churches have originated in Africa and have no foreign financial or ecclesiastical control. "African Initiated Churches" indicates that they were started as a result of African initiative in African countries but they may be affiliated to wider bodies that include non-African members. African indigenous indicates that they have retained an African ethos and that their ideology has a distinctive African flavour. "African Instituted Churches" hints that their establishment and growth have taken place on African soil, under the initiatives of Africans.) The abbreviation "AIC" covers them all. The differences in names correspond to the aspect that a researcher wishes to emphasise. For instance, those who wish to point out that AICs exhibit African cultural forms, describe them as indigenous. These terms have largely been imposed upon such groups and may not be the way they would describe themselves.

The term African refers to the fact that these Christian groupings formed in Africa, but AICs differ from one another. Not all African cultural systems are the same. Regional variations occur among West, East, North, Central, and Southern Africans, and the AICs will reflect these. AICs can now be found outside Africa.

== Location ==
African-initiated churches are found across Africa; they are particularly well-documented in southern Africa and West Africa. Pauw suggests that at least 36 per cent of the population of Africa belong to an African-initiated church.

== Origins ==
During the colonial era starting in the 1800s, when European powers took control of most of the African continent, Black converts to Christianity were unable fully to reconcile their beliefs with the teachings of their church leaders, and split from their parent churches. The reasons for these splits were usually either:

- Political – an effort to escape white control
- Historical – many of the parent churches, particularly those from a Protestant tradition, had themselves emerged from a process of schism and synthesis
- Cultural – the result of trying to accommodate Christian belief within an African world view

Some scholars argue that independent churches or religious movements demonstrate syncretism or partial integration between aspects of Christian belief and African traditional religion. Often, these churches have resulted from a process of acculturation between traditional African beliefs and Protestant Christianity and have split from their parent churches. Bengt Sundkler, one of the most prominent pioneers of research on African independent churches in South Africa, initially argued that AICs were bridges back to a pre-industrial culture. Later, he recognized instead that AICs helped their affiliates to adapt to a modernizing world that was hostile to their cultural beliefs. In 1925, the Cherubim and Seraphim (Nigerian church) was established as the first African-initiated church.

== Classification and taxonomy ==
There are thousands of African-initiated churches (more than 10,000 in South Africa alone), and each one has its own characteristics. Ecclesiologists, missiologists, sociologists, and others have tried to group them according to shared characteristics, though disagreements have arisen about which characteristics are most significant and which taxonomy is most accurate. Although it is possible to distinguish groups of denominations with common features, there is also much overlap, with some denominations sharing the characteristics of two or more groups.

Many AICs share traditions with Christians from other parts of the Christian world, which can also be used to classify them. There are AICs that share some beliefs or practices with Protestant churches. Some are Sabbatarian, some are Zionist, and others neither.

=== Ethiopian churches ===
Ethiopian churches generally retain their mother church's Christian doctrine in an unreformed state. Ethiopian African-initiated churches, which are recently formed Protestant congregations mostly in southern Africa, arose from the Ethiopian movement of the late nineteenth century, which taught that Black people should control African Christian churches. They should not be confused with the Ethiopian Orthodox Tewahedo Church or Coptic Orthodox Church, which have a much longer and distinct doctrinal histories. Some denominations that arose from the Ethiopian movement have united with these earlier denominations.

=== Zionist churches ===
Zionist churches, such as the Zion Christian Church, trace their origins to the Christ Community Church, founded by John Alexander Dowie, with its headquarters in Zion, Illinois. Zionist churches are found chiefly in Southern Africa. In the early 1900s, Zionist Christian missionaries went to South Africa from the United States and established congregations. They emphasised divine healing, abstention from pork, and wearing white robes.

The Zionist missionaries were followed by Pentecostal ones, whose teaching concentrated on spiritual gifts and baptism with the Holy Spirit, with glossolalia as the initial evidence of this. The predominantly white Apostolic Faith Mission of South Africa arose out of this missionary effort and emphasised the Pentecostal teaching.

The Black Zionists retained much of the original Zionist tradition. The Zionists split into several different denominations, but the reason for this was the rapid growth of the movement rather than divisions. A split in the Zionist movement in the U.S. meant that after 1908, few missionaries came to southern Africa. The movement in southern Africa and its growth resulted from Black leadership and initiative. As time passed, some Zionist groups began to mix aspects of traditional African beliefs, such as veneration of the dead, with Christian doctrine. Many Zionists stress faith healing and revelation, and in many congregations, the leader is viewed as a prophet.

=== Messianic churches ===
Some researchers have described some AICs with strong leadership as messianic, but opinions have also changed. The churches that have been called messianic focus on the power and sanctity of their leaders; often, the leaders are thought by their followers to possess Jesus-like characteristics. Denominations described as messianic include Kimbanguism in the Democratic Republic of the Congo; the Nazareth Baptist Church of Isaiah Shembe in KwaZulu-Natal, South Africa; the Zion Christian Church of Engenas Lekganyane with headquarters in Limpopo, South Africa; and the Ibandla Lenkosi Apostolic Church in Zion of South Africa and Swaziland. Kimbanguism is estimated to be the largest African-initiated church.

=== Aladura Pentecostal churches ===
The Aladura Pentecostal churches originated in Nigeria. They rely on the power of prayer and baptism of the Holy Spirit. Today, such churches include Christ Apostolic Church, the Cherubim and Seraphim movement, Celestial Church of Christ, and Church of the Lord (Aladura). The first Aladura movement was started in 1918 in Ijebu Ode, now in Ogun State, Nigeria, by Sophia Odunlami and Joseph Sadare. They both attended St. Saviour's Anglican Church. They rejected infant baptism and all forms of medicine, whether Western or traditional. Consequently, they initiated the "Prayer Band", popularly called Egbe Aladura. Joseph Sadare was compelled to give up his post in the Synod; others were forced to resign their jobs and withdraw their children from the Anglican School. The Aladura began as a Christian revival in search of true spirituality.

A revival took place during the 1918 flu pandemic. This consolidated the formation of the prayer group, which was named Precious Stone and later the Diamond Society. By 1920, the Diamond Society had grown tremendously and started forming branches around the Western region of Nigeria. In particular, David Odubanjo went to start the Lagos branch. The group emphasised divine healing, holiness, and reliance on the divine—three cardinal beliefs of the Church today. For this reason, the group associated with Faith Tabernacle Congregation of Philadelphia changed its name to Faith Tabernacle of Nigeria.

The Nigerian revival started in 1930, and the leaders of the Cherubim & Seraphim, The Church of the Lord (Aladura), and the Faith Tabernacle played important roles. Adherents believed that the leaders—Joseph Sadare of "Egbe Aladura", David Odubanjo of "Diamond Society", Moses Orimolade of "Cherubim & Seraphim", and Josiah Ositelu of "The Church of the Lord (Aladura)"—performed several miracles. The revival started in Ibadan in the southwest of Nigeria and later spread to other parts of the country.

The group went through several name changes until, 24 years after formation, it adopted the name Christ Apostolic Church (CAC) in 1942. Today, the CAC has spread worldwide and is the precursor of Aladura Pentecostal Churches in Nigeria. The church has established several educational institutions in Nigeria, including Joseph Ayo Babalola University and primary and secondary schools.

== See also ==
- Apostles of Johane Marange
- Celestial Church of Christ
- Deeper Life Bible Church
- Church of the Lord (Aladura)
- Christ Apostolic Church
- Legio Maria of African Church Mission
- Kimbanguist Church
- New religious movement
- Zion Christian Church
- List of Christian denominations
