= Kuriakos TV =

- Country: Portugal
- Broadcast area: Portugal, Europe

Programming
- Picture format: 1080i HDTV

Ownership
- Owner: Motes e Ideias, Lda. (Maná Church)
- Sister channels: TV Maná 1

History
- Launched: 19 July 2016

Kuriakos TV is a Portuguese Christian channel owned by the Maná Church, an evangelical church founded by Apostle Jorge Tadeu. Most of its programming is sourced from TV Maná 1, a satellite channel dating back to 2003 (originally known as Manásat), and mostly consists of Christian programming, as well as a handful of secular programs and a daily news service.

== History ==
The name Kuriakos has been used by the Maná Church for a youth group; in February 2010, the Manásat 2 channel was renamed Kurios TV. It was with this name that the Maná Church registered a new channel for cable companies, on May 6, 2016, and with Vodafone Portugal being in charge of its distribution to operators. The license behind Kurios TV was held by Motes & Ideias, which was managed by former Portuguese expatriates.

The channel started broadcasting on July 16, 2016, but, instead of using the name Kurios TV, opted to use Kuriakos TV, with a special three-hour broadcast starting at 10:30am. The event was simulcast with TV Maná 1, its extant satellite channel. Motes & Ideias requested a name change on June 20, a month ahead of launch. In July 2017, the channel launched on Nowo.

Kuriakos TV disseminates the church's ideologies, such as its practice of tithing, as well as airing advertisements for its other activities. It also airs key Maná events.

Per ERC's annual report assessing the amount of local programming on the channels it licensed, it was one of several that had satisfactory results, close to 100%.

Since 2019, the channel airs a political talk show, Isto é o Povo a Falar!, which interviews political figures, mostly from fringe far-right parties. Chega leader André Ventura has been interviewed by the program several times.
