= Oleseng Shuping =

South African gospel singer

Oleseng Shadrack Shuping (27 December 1963 – 12 July 2010) also known as Mandlebe & Mzambia was a South African gospel singer.

At the time of his death, Drum magazine described him as "one of the most loved gospel stars in Mzansi." The City Press described him as "a giant of the South African traditional gospel genre". His singing career, was nothing short of a miracle, given that he grew up with a dental anomaly, a condition referred to as malocclusion, which is a misalignment or incorrect relation between the teeth of the upper and lower dental arches when they approach each other as the jaws close. Thus preventing him to talk as normal, let alone sing.

During his early childhood, he was at some point, taken to the popular Zion Christian Church (Z.C.C), a large Christian movement, under the leadership of His Grace The Great Reverend Edward Lekganyane where the teeth condition is said to have been healed and restored to normality. Returning from the miraculous healing trip, Oleseng Shadrack Shuping did not waste much time, he burst into singing, a move that marked a trajectory upwards, towards what would become one of the most memorable Christian Gospel music careers known to South Africa.

At first, in his early youth, he sang in Local groups, then his family relocated to Pretoria, Attridgeville a transition that paved way for his music career begin and eventually skyrocket to the top. At the age of 14, Shuping became part of the male choir Atteridgeville Happy Boys, playing regional events. The group did not release an album until 1992, when Mahlomoleng Aka came out. However, the band temporarily stopped recording after two more albums because they felt they were not being properly compensated for their albums.

On his own, following the halting of singing together with the group, he began exploring a solo career, Shuping released a successful solo album titled, Segopole Boikgantsho. He would continue releasing solo backed by The African Gospel Singers and with his band. In 2004, he created his own record label, OSSH Productions.

Shuping died on 12 July 2010 of pneumonia. He had been in poor health since a serious car accident on 12 June 2006 left him a quadriplegic and cost him a lung, leaving him unable to sing.

== Discography ==
=== Solo ===
- Oleseng & Friends Posthumous Album (2013)
- Tsa Bofelo Vol 2 Posthumous Album (2013)
- Tsa Bofelo Posthumous Album (2010)
- I Need Your Touch (2009)
- Tse Ratwang (2009)
- Double Gold Gospel Hits (2008)
- Dithoriso Diye Go Ntate (2006)
- Africa (2005)
- Hare Atla Ka Boikhantsho (2004)
- My Shepherd (2004)
- Kea Cha, Kea Tuka (2003)
- Glory To God (2003)
- ’’Ha di tshwane (2002)
- Sentebale Le Nna (2001)
- Ungigqilazelani? (2001)
- Oa Lebona Naa? (2000)
- Morena Ha Ore Yalo (1999)
- Segopole Boikhantsho (1998)

=== With The Attridgeville Happy Boys ===
- Oho Ntate Re Hauele (2007)
- Ke Fodile (2006)
- Ikgetheleng (2005)
- The Best Of Atteridgeville Happy Boys (2003)
- Yaka Kgosi (2003)
- Letona La Kandase (2002)
- Motse Oa Sione (2001)
- Rea Mo Leboha (2000)
- Marumo Fase (1999)
- Moya (1996)
- Rehauhele (1995)
- Mahlomoleng A Ka (1992)
- Atteridgeville HB

=== With The Rock ===
- The Rock 3 Basione (2001)
- The Rock 4 Ntshwarele Hle Ntate (2002)
- The Rock 5 Ho Lokile (2003)
- The Rock 6 Evangeli (2004)
- The Rock 7 Thabeng (2005)
- The Rock 8 Lazaro (2006)
