= Pieter Louis Le Roux =

South African missionary (1865–1943)

- Born: 1865; Wellington, Cape Colony
- Died: 1943; Durban, South Africa
- Occupation: Minister
- Spouse: Adriana Josina van Rooyen

Pieter Louis Le Roux or P. L. Le Roux (1865–1943) was a South African missionary, who was a leading figure in the Zion Church movement in South Africa and the Apostolic Faith Mission of South Africa. Le Roux was initially a missionary for the Dutch Reformed Church. He was heavily influenced by the healing ministry of John Alexander Dowie and his Zionist movement which he later joined. Later he joined the Pentecostal movement of John G. Lake and Thomas Hezmalhalch. He was president of the Apostolic Faith Mission of South Africa from 1913 to 1942. His involvement with black leaders in South Africa led to the establishment of a conglomerate of churches from both Zionist and Pentecostal backgrounds, most notably the Zion Christian Church (ZCC).
