= Moederkerk, Krugersdorp =

Tower of Life
- Krugersdorp Moederkerk
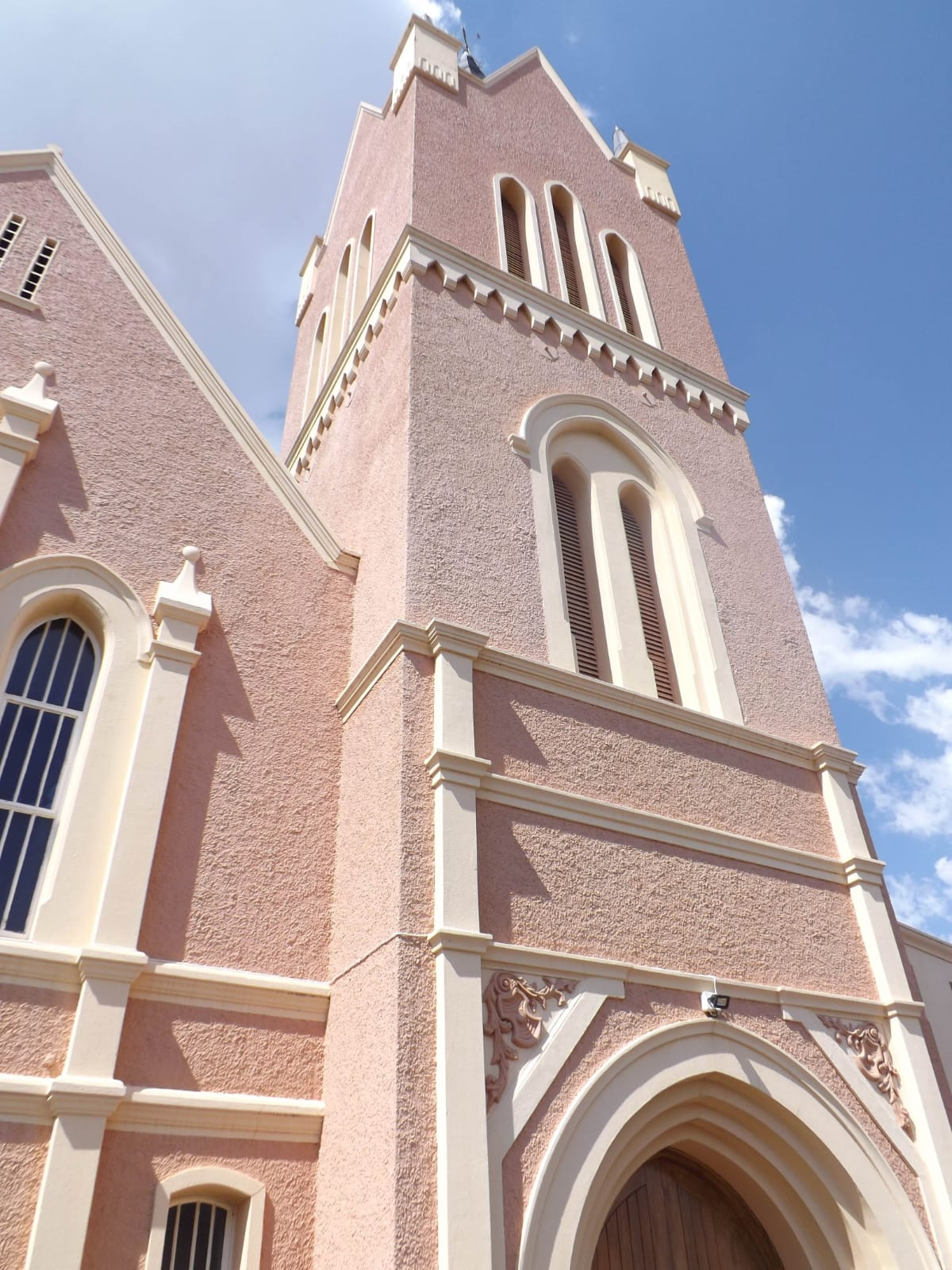
- The Church building of the NG Moederkerk in Krugersdorp around 1917
- Tower of Life
- 26.101393°S 27.775243°E
- Location: Krugersdorp (Mogale City)
- Country: South Africa
- Denomination: Dutch Reformed Church

History
- Founded: 1889

Architecture
- Functional status: church
- Closed: 2010

The Moederkerk (Afrikaans for Mother Church) in Krugersdorp (Kruger’s Town) was one of the eldest Afrikaans church communities on the Witwatersrand and these building used to be a place of worship for the Dutch Reformed Community. Today, these historic church buildings serve a new church community with a homeless shelter and the NG church community has moved to Luipaardsvlei.

== Origins ==
Krugersdorp (Kruger's Town) was established in 1887 and the first local church meeting of the Dutch Reformed Church was held on the farm Paardekraal on the 18 November 1889 at the home of M.P.W. Pretorius. This gathering was held two years before the Paardekraal monument was unveiled by President Kruger on December 16, 1891. Paardekraal Farm, (today Krugersdorp), was the site of undocumented gold discovery, made in 1852, by John Henry Davis, a Welsh Geologist, who was reprimanded by President Marthinus Pretorius and deported. This discovery is largely unknown, however, when the main reef was formally identified in 1886, by George Harrison and his Zoeker's Claim Langlaagte No.19, the need grew for a local church in Paardekraal (Krugersdorp) also became clearer.

== Moederkerk ==
The Dutch Reformed Church was established as the NG mother church (moederkerk) in Krugersdorp on 7 June 1890. Soon after, Rev H.J. Becker who was confirmed as the first minister on 6 September 1890, marking a new era for this mining town. During Becker’s tenure, a church building was established on land granted by President Paul Kruger and a church cornerstone was laid in 1894. The building in a Norman gothic style at a cost of £6000 and was dedicated in Jan 1895. The consecration was a major event with 158 wagons counted on church square. It was here that church members would draw together and pitch camp for a church weekend, for baptisms, communication and confirmation. This church would also be the site for the funerals of those who died during the Jamison raid.

His successor was Rev. F.G.T. Radloff from Hoopstad who began his ministry on 17 December 1898, which would span the war and post-war misery. Radloff and his wife did a great deal to support the suffering people in the concentration camp as well as the prisoners of war in the town. He not only cultivated them spiritually, but under his leadership a commission was established which provided for the most essential needs of the suffering people in the camp and town.

After Rev. Radloff accepted his emeritus position on 11 October 1914, he was succeeded by Rev. P.J. van Vuuren, who served the congregation from 1915 to 1921, and then accepted a call to Vredefort. Under his diligent leadership, the pressing church debt was paid off.

The next minister of the congregation was Rev. J.J. Krige who was confirmed here on 21 April 1922. He worked in the congregation for fourteen years, until he was unexpectedly called to higher service on 29 October 1936.

In November 1937 Rev. A.T. Martinson was confirmed in the congregation. On 29 November 1941 Rev. C.C. van Dyk was confirmed as the first associate pastor of the congregation. In 1944 he was called to the youngest daughter congregation, Krugersdorp-Noord.

== Growth ==
Thanks to the zeal of the various ministers and in particular that of Rev. Martinson, the congregation fulfilled its role in terms of missions, poor relief, Sunday school, church associations and education. With the rapid development of the West Rand, the membership of the congregation grew rapidly and increased to such an extent that the following daughter congregations had to be separated: Roodepoort in 1905, Magaliesburg in 1910, Randpoort (Randgate) in 1918, Burgershoop (Krugersdorp-Wes, later called Suiderlig) in 1920, Krugersdorp-Noord in 1943.

The mother church of Krugersdorp had a membership of approximately 1,350 in 1952, while the church council numbered 56. Prop. T.J. Hanekom was confirmed as co-pastor of the congregation in October 1951.

== Closure and Renewal ==
In 2010, the Dutch Reformed congregation was incorporated into the NG congregation at Luipaardsvlei. The church building is now called the Tower of Life and is a part of the Apostolic Faith Mission (AFM) inner city mission, where the pastor and church community offers ‘emergency, overnight shelter for vulnerable, destitute and homeless men.
