= Maná Church =

The Maná Church (Igreja Maná) is a Portuguese neopentecostalist church. Founded in 1984, it is present in over 80 countries around the world. Its founder and leader is Apostle Jorge Tadeu.

== History ==
The church was founded in September 1984 in Lisbon by Jorge Tadeu, previously a member of the Apostolic Faith Mission of South Africa and civil engineer; his latter career caused the church to establish its own Civil Engineering and Architecture Department. For its twentieth anniversary in September 2004, it held its annual Faith Convention at Pavilhão Atlântico, with the special participation of Prime Minister Pedro Santana Lopes.

The Angolan regime led by the MPLA caused it to be banned from Angola in 2008, which led to its services resuming in 2009 under the name Igreja Josafat. The ban was lifted in 2017, causing Josafat to shut down and the Maná Church to resume operations. Following the return, Jorge Tadeu made his first visit to Angola since 2006.

Politically, the church is aligned with Chega, this alignment is often denied.
