= Atteridgeville Happy Boys =

Atteridgeville Happy Boys is a South African gospel choir formed in the Pretoria township of Atteridgeville. The choir is a male-only choir and it is known for their worship and songs of praise.

== Notable members ==
- Oleseng Shuping

== Solo ==
- Mahlomoleng Aka (1991)
- Ikgetheleng
- Yaka Kgosi
- Rea Mo Leboha
- Marumo Fase

=== With Oleseng Shuping ===
- Oho Ntate Re Hauela (2007)
- Ke Fodile (2006)
- Ikgetheleng (2005)
- The Best Of Atteridgeville Happy Boys (2003)
- Yaka Kgosi (2003)
- Letona La Kandase (2002)
- Motse Oa Sione (2001)
- Rea Mo Leboha (2000)
- Marumo Fase (1999)
- Moya (1996)
- Rehauhele (1995)
- Mahlomoleng A Ka (1992)
- Atteridgeville HB
