= Edward Lekganyane =

Religious leader (1922 – 1967)

Edward Lekganyane, popularly known as "Kgoshi Edward" (1922 – 21 October 1967), was the leader of the Zion Christian Church (ZCC) from Easter Sunday, April 17, 1949, until his death eighteen years later. During this time he used his charisma and organizational abilities to expand the ZCC from about 50,000 to 600,000 members, while also reshaping numerous facets of the church. During his tenure as bishop, the ZCC emerged as South Africa's largest independent church, while Lekganyane became arguably the wealthiest and most powerful African in apartheid-era South Africa.

== Early life and career ==
Edward was the second-born son of Engenas Lekganyane and his senior wife, Salfina Rabodiba, and was born in Thabakgone in the Mamabolo Reserve east of Polokwane. Although his exact birth date is unknown, he is known to have been born during a smallpox epidemic that led his father to quarantine his household for some time. At this time, Engenas Lekganyane was the Transvaal leader of the Zion Apostolic Faith Mission church, led by Edward Lion, who he named his son after. Edward was then educated by his father at private schools in the area, eventually obtaining Standard 5. As one of five legitimate sons of Engenas Lekganyane, he was one of two brothers seen as a potential successor by his father (the other being his youngest brother, Joseph, b. 1931). Although his father had hopes for him, Edward was not a particularly diligent student, and nor did he fulfil his church duties particularly faithfully. After he was married to a woman selected by his family in the mid-1940s, Edward fell out with his father when he demanded a divorce since he was unhappy with the arrangement. His father refused to sanction the idea, leading Edward to leave home and obtain an itinerant job as a driver based out of Durban. This further angered his father, who wanted to Edward to lead the ZCC brass band. During his absence, the youngest of the Lekganyane brothers, Joseph, became his father's principal driver and assistant.

== Assuming Control of the ZCC ==
Following the death of Engenas Lekganyane in June 1948, members of the Zion Christian Church were split regarding the appointment of his heir. Engenas himself had never been clear about the succession and was particularly indecisive in the latter years of his life. Because Edward never returned home prior to his father's death, it appears that Engenas told his brother, Paulus, to install Joseph as his successor after a year's mourning period. This designation, if made, was not known to the membership.

Edward, on the death of his father, returned to the ZCC headquarters of Zion City Moriah and began to lobby for his appointment as the new bishop. By this time he was viewed as the natural successor of Engenas Lekganyane by most of the ZCC's membership on the Witwatersrand. During his years as a driver, Edward had had the ability to interact continuously with the leadership and membership of the ZCC's urban ranks—which outnumbered its rural base. After spending some time with these supporters in Alexandra in 1948, Edward returned to Zion City Moriah one weekend with a large contingent that he bused in. Using this group as muscle, he was able to take over his father's residence and headquarters, forcing his uncle Paulus to evacuate.

On 1 June 1949 thousands of ZCC members assembled at the church's headquarters in Moria to vote for their leader of choice between Edward and his uncle, Paulus. The election of the leader or bishop was overseen by " sergeant Kotzee" of the then South African police and multiracial constables. Edward received the most votes since most of the ZCC members were from the Witwatersrand where he had the most support and was the preferred successor of Engenas there. Less than two weeks after the election, Edward Lekganyane was declared the winner and was installed as the bishop of the ZCC church. Joseph however refused to accept the election results maintaining that Engenas left a will naming him as the rightful successor, Joseph and his supporters including Paulus and the inner Lekganyane circle were then driven by force onto the land that Joseph inherited. Edward Lekganyane' s new appointed position as bishop allowed him to appoint even non family members to key positions in the church

Edward's urban supporters, who chanted "Eddy ke morena ka sebele" and who performed the stomping "mokhukhu" dance, further supported Edward's installation as Bishop east at the Zion Christian Church Easter ceremonies in 1949. At this event, Edward's uncle, Reuben, who had been estranged from Engenas, installed Edward on behalf of the authority of the church and the Lekganyane family.

During 1950, Paulus and the supporters of Joseph became increasingly alienated from Edward's leadership, and eventually seceded to form the St. Engenas Zion Christian Church. Citing prophecies from as far back as 1931 and Paulus's testimony that Joseph had been the preferred successor, they established a base only a couple of kilometers away from Zion City Moriah on land that Joseph had inherited. His church would never rival, though, Edward's rapidly-expanding congregation.

== Early Leadership of the ZCC ==
Edward became an active evangelist for the ZCC, ending a period in which such activities had been reduced following his father's ill-health in the mid-1940s. On most weekends, Edward travelled to the townships in the Witwatersrand, driving in a fleet of fancy cars, where he was met by large crowds of church members and his brass band. They then marched through townships, dancing and singing in their regalia, before finally preaching to the assembled masses. In this way, ZCC membership grew quite dramatically in urban areas. Typically, Edward preached against the use of both witchcraft and modern medicine, alcohol and drugs, and urged people to live godly, Christian lives.

As his position became more secure following the secession of Joseph's St. Engenas faction, Edward instituted several crucial changes in ZCC practices. First, he created the "Mokhukhu" organization within the church, to which all men were expected to belong. This group met twice-weekly at prescribed times in its military-style uniforms, and danced for hours in the "mokhukhu" stomping style. According to one interpretation, the function of the mokhukhu was to make rural-urban migrants more disciplined and hireable by employers, thus gaining them an advantage in the competitive job market.

A second change, instituted in late 1952, was to make the ZCC's preaching far more politically conservative. Prior to this time, the Lekganyanes had clashed with rural chiefs and had done everything they could to escape involvement with the government and white authorities. Edward, meanwhile, had often spoken bitterly of racism. But after 1952, with the National Party in power and apartheid entrenched, Edward decided to make peace with the government. He told his followers not to join the African National Congress or any anti-government party. Additionally, he demanded that his followers contract marriages formally through the paying of bridewealth for the first time, a move that buttressed the control of rural chiefs over their followers.

From 1952 until his death, Edward became a fervent supporter of the apartheid government, although his successors have maintained that he was not sincere and was merely strategizing a way forward out of a difficult situation. Senior government officials were brought in to attend proceedings at the major ZCC conferences, and Lekganyane publicly praised government leaders. In return he was allowed to purchase a wide range of properties in the Transvaal, a rare privilege for Africans of the time.

Lekganyane also built up his power and wealth by reinvesting tithes and donations into a number of successful business ventures. He had his own lucrative brands of coffee and tea and other consumables that members purchased. He also organized transport, milling, agricultural processing companies, and sold life insurance and burial insurance. Using white lawyers to organize these activities, he built up a secretive and lucrative business domain in his own personal name.

== Later life and career ==
By the late 1950s Edward Lekganyane was a rich man. With his church expanding rapidly along with its revenues, he lived in a large residence with a fleet of expensive vehicles. He also began to increase his profile, journeying to Europe and America in 1959 and 1960 with his entourage. His departures from the Johannesburg airport led to some of the biggest crowds ever seen there. This increasing exposure did not always bring Lekganyane the results he desired. In 1954 he was incensed by coverage in the South African magazine, Drum, and launched a bitter libel lawsuit versus the publication that he refused to relent on for many years.

During his tenure as leader the Zion Christian Church built up its international membership. Large congregations developed in Lesotho, Swaziland, and Botswana. The biggest international section, based in Zimbabwe, which had been part of the church since its founding in 1925, ultimately split from Edward's control in 1962 over a number of issues.

In 1963 Edward was able to enroll at the Stofberg Theological School, run by the Dutch Reformed Church, where he graduated from after three years of training. Although he subsequently aimed to reform the ZCC's theology, his death came too soon for him to make substantive changes.

After Edward died of a heart attack suddenly in late 1967, he was succeeded by his son Barnabas.
