= Zionist churches =

Christian denominations

Zionist churches are a group of Pentecostal Christian denominations that derive from the Christian Catholic Apostolic Church, which was founded by John Alexander Dowie in Zion, Illinois, US, at the end of the 19th century. Missionaries from the church came to South Africa in 1904. Among their first recruits were Pieter Louis Le Roux and Daniel Nkonyane of Wakkerstroom; both continued to evangelize after the Zionist missionaries left in 1908.

== History ==
The Zionist Churches proliferated throughout southern Africa, and became African Independent Churches; research in 1996 suggested that 40% of all black South Africans belonged to a Zionist church.

The Old Cornerstone Apostolic Church in Zion of South Africa, under Archbishop Mawethu Anthwell, had its beliefs grow out of late-nineteenth and early-twentieth religious missions in Southern Africa. In particular the churches owe their origins to the Christian Catholic Apostolic Church of John Alexander Dowie, based in Zion, Illinois, in the United States.

The arrival of Dowie's emissary, Daniel Bryant, in 1904 led to the formation of a formal Zionist church. Prior to this, two concentrations of sympathizers, in response to Dowie's publication Leaves of Healing, had existed on the Witwatersrand and at Wakkerstroom in the Transvaal. This initial Zionist church did not flourish for long due to Dowie's disgracing in America. In 1908, however, the arrival of the former Zionist-turned-Pentecostal John G. Lake led to most former Zionists embracing the newly formed Apostolic Faith Mission. The vast majority of all Zionist sects derive from secessions from the Apostolic Faith Mission, which fused Pentecostalism with Dowie's Zionist ideas about faith healing.

Several key African-led secessions from the AFM led to the explosion of Zionist sects in the 1910s and 1920s. The first was led by Daniel Nkonyane, who was Le Roux's deputy in Wakkerstroom. In 1908 Le Roux became an important AFM official and spent most of his time in the Johannesburg headquarters thereafter. In his absence Nkonyane took effective control and insisted on several key changes to doctrine. Perhaps most importantly, he stressed the need for his followers to propitiate their ancestors—a practice abhorred by the AFM and most Christian denominations. Nkonyane maintained that “Whoever forsakes his ancestors is also forsaken by his ancestors and he becomes an easy prey for disease.” He also insisted that the form of ornate religious dress worn by Dowie, including robes, staffs, and other paraphernalia, should be used in his congregation. In 1910 Nkonyane's defiance of the AFM and local authorities led to his expulsion from Wakkerstroom. Eventually, he and about two-thirds of the Wakkerstroom congregation pooled their resources and obtained freehold property in Charlestown, Natal, where they built the first South African "Zion". Many dozens of offshoots from Nkonyane's church formed small Zionist churches, especially in Swaziland (today Eswatini) and Natal.

The next significant secession from the AFM was by a little-known member, Isaiah Shembe, who was a member of the AFM for only a year in the Orange Free State, when the Ethiopian church that he preached for joined the AFM en masse. In 1911 Shembe left the Free State and moved to Natal, where he used the AFM's faith healing techniques to build up a following across the province. Harnessing the meager resources of his followers, he formed the Narazeth Baptist Church and purchased freehold land at Ekuphakameni, the second South African "Zion". Shembe's Nazarite church became the largest Zionist congregation, until overtaken by the Zion Christian Church in the 1950s. Shembe's church was distinct from most other Zionist sects in that he insisted that he was a prophet sent directly from God to the Zulu nation. Most other Zionists were distinctly non-ethnic in outlook.

Edward Lion's Zion Apostolic Faith Mission (ZAFM) was also a critical early Zionist sect. Lion, an early Zionist convert, was appointed AFM leader in Basotholand in 1912. Prior to this Lion had received extensive training as a faith healer by John G. Lake. After obtaining land from a sympathetic chief, Lion began to build his own Zion in Kolonyama, Basotholand (now known as Lesotho), and formed ZAFM in 1917. Still under the AFM umbrella, he moved his followers to Kolonyama in 1920, and had an increasingly fractious relationship with the AFM until he was expelled in 1923. A number of doctrinal innovations, including sexual confession, brought him to the attention of the authorities, and Lion was eventually jailed for rape and subsequently expelled from Basotholand in 1927. Following his expulsion, Lion raised funds by garnishing his congregation's wages, and bought several pieces of freehold land in the Transvaal that he attempted to turn into another "Zion". Lion's organization failed to grow significantly after his expulsion. Among its more important offshoots was the Zion Christian Church, whose founder, Engenas Lekganyane, was Lion's Transvaal leader in the early 1920s.

== Succession disputes ==
Schisms and succession disputes during the twentieth century led to the foundation of thousands of different congregations, of which the largest is the Zion Christian Church, with around 3 million followers, led by Barnabas Edward Lekganyane.

== Characteristics of Zionist churches ==
Zionist churches are characterised by the following features:

- Use of faith-healing and revelation through dreams
- Baptism in rivers
- Ritual garments, often mostly white, and prophetic staffs.
- Food taboos, such as not eating pork.
- Some smaller denominations worship in the open air, and practise "wheel" dances—dancing in circles, sometimes to the beat of drums.
- Some denominations accept polygamy.
- Some denominations show syncretic mixing of Christian and traditional African religious beliefs
- Some denominations hold isiguqo prayer circles

== See also ==
- African-initiated Church
