= Zion Christian Church =

South African church

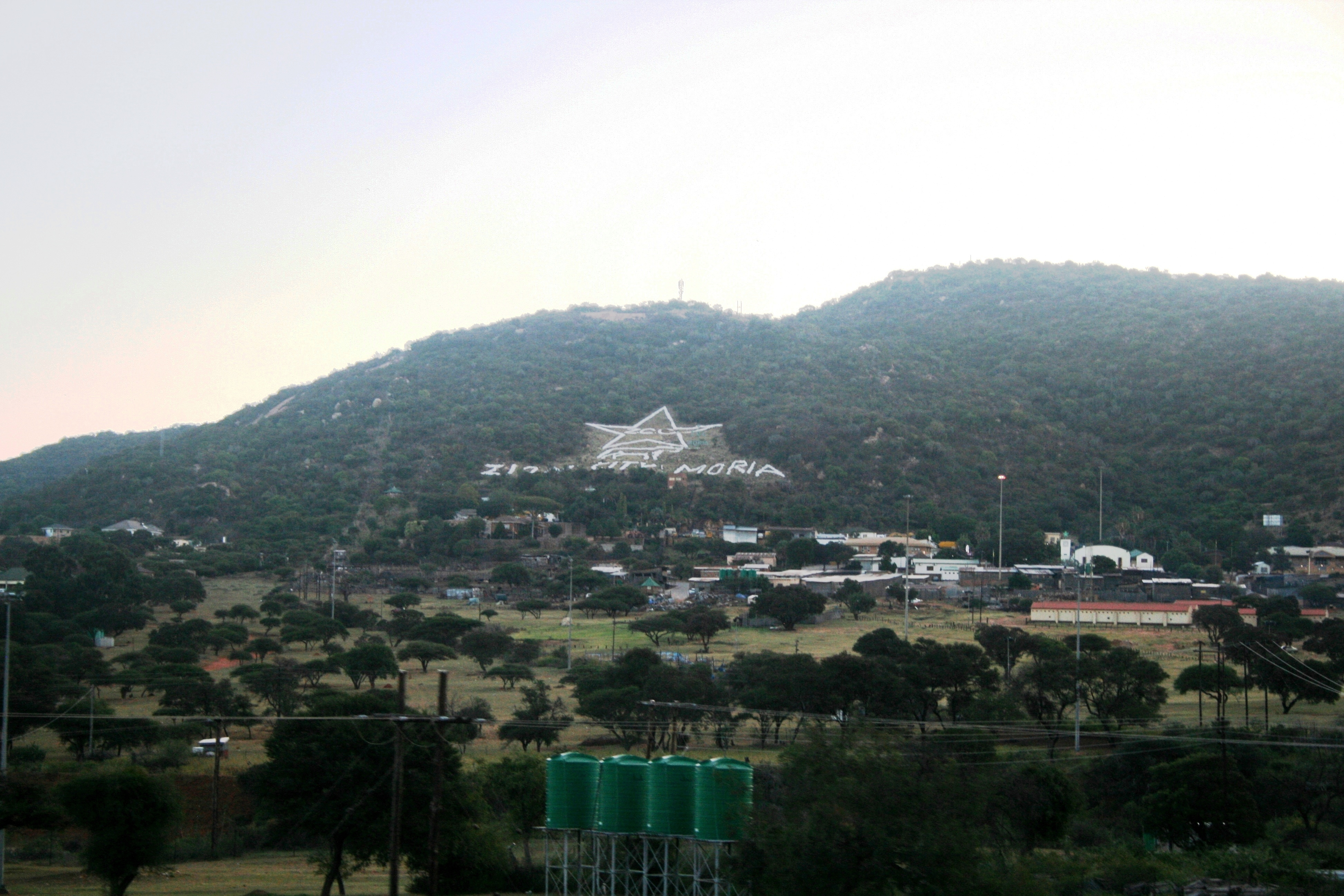
Zion City Moria beside the R71 route, Limpopo

The Zion Christian Church (ZCC) is one of the largest African-initiated churches operating across Southern Africa, and is part of the African Zionism movement. The church's headquarters are at Zion City Moria in Limpopo Province (old Northern Transvaal), South Africa.

According to the 1996 South African Census, the church numbered 3.87 million members. By the 2001 South African Census, its membership had increased to 4.97 million members.

== History ==
ZCC founder Engenas Lekganyane joined the Apostolic Faith Mission in Boksburg after being educated at two Anglican missions. He then joined the Zion Apostolic Church schism and eventually became a preacher of a congregation in his home village during late World War I. After falling out with the ZAC leadership, Lekganyane went to Basutoland to join Edward Lion's Zion Apostolic Faith Mission

Engenas Lekganyane founded the ZCC after a revelation which Engenas Lekganyane is said to have received from God on the top of Mt Thabakgone in 1910. After splitting from Lion, Engenas Lekganyane used his home village of Thabakgone, near Polokwane (Pietersburg), as the headquarters, with about twenty initial congregations in the Northern Transvaal, the Witwatersrand, and Rhodesia. In 1930 Lekganyane began building a stone church there. After clashes with his chief, Engenas Lekganyane was expelled with his church still unfinished. Determined to obtain land, he eventually purchased three farms in the Polokwane area. Maclean Farm near Thabakgone would eventually be renamed "Moria," the ZCC's headquarters. The ZCC was officially registered in 1962 after the government's reluctance to recognize one of the continent's largest and most influential churches. The early church was strongly influenced by the doctrines of the Christian Catholic Church of John Alexander Dowie, based in Zion, Illinois, in the United States of America, and by the teachings of the Pentecostal missionary John G. Lake, who began work in Johannesburg in 1908.

Due to Engenas Lekganyane's attempts to appeal to migrant workers, the ZCC developed an international membership very early on, which went on to set up many congregations in neighboring countries like Zimbabwe. In the late 1930s, migrant workers from Botswana also started ZCC chapters, although they faced considerable opposition from the authorities.

Following Engenas Lekganyane's death in 1948, a major split in the church occurred. The church's large section of male migrant workers generally backed Engenas Lekganyane's oldest surviving son, the charismatic Edward Lekganyane, to succeed his father as the ZCC Bishop. The church's rural base, meanwhile, backed a younger son, Joseph, to assume church leadership. Although events are highly disputed, Engenas Lekganyane himself appears to have favoured Joseph even though Edward was the chosen one— who served as his father's adviser and chauffeur during the 1940s. According to some traditions, during Engenas Lekganyane's mourning period, Edward's supporters mobilized on the Witwatersrand and hired buses to take them to Moria. After arrival, this large, armed group was able to eject the pro-Joseph faction and take over the church's headquarters and infrastructure. Contemporary records relating to the event show that Edward was installed peacefully in Easter 1949 in a large ceremony by his uncle, Reuben. Other written reports from the following year indicate that strong opposition to his leadership had arisen among "most of the preachers" in the ZCC who were "shocked" by Edward: "they denied the son of the great Lekganyane, saying he was not leader of the church." Initially, the two factions remained together, but Edward soon insisted that all members declare their loyalty in public, and this led to a permanent split. The ZCC continued under Edward's leadership, while Joseph seceded and formed the St. Engenas Zion Christian Church in 1949.

The ZCC changed fairly dramatically following his son Edward Lekganyane's assumption of control of the church in April 1949. Edward was a highly educated, flamboyant figure who eventually obtained a degree at an Afrikaans divinity school. Under his leadership, the all-male Mokhukhu organisation developed out of his core group of supporters. This group initially formed as a church choir. Wearing military-style khakis, police-style hats, and the Star badge, the Mokhukhu in each congregation engaged in dancing, singing, and praying three times a week according to a preset schedule. An additional feature of Edward's control of the ZCC was the rapid growth of Zion City Moria as a pilgrimage site. Using the Boyne farm that his father had purchased in the 1940s, Edward instituted annual pilgrimages that have gone on to become massive southern African-wide events. Each year during Easter Holidays, up to a million Church members bus en masse to Moria, Polokwane (Pietersburg), to meet the Bishop and to pray for blessings.

== Characteristics ==
The church fuses African traditions and values with Protestant Christian faith. As opposed to the mainstream European churches, the church has sought independence and autonomy in terms of theological and dogmatic approach. According to the ZCC, scholars such as EK Lukhaimane, Hanekom, Kruger, Sundkler and Daneel did not understand the ZCC's approach to Christianity. Due to the apartheid education system in which Africans and their beliefs were rejected and mocked, they saw ZCC as a sect. This situation was exacerbated by the church's policy on secrecy, which limited its ability to publicise its activities. As a result, the ZCC maintains that much writing about it is inaccurate. The church still believes in prophecy, the power of healing and spiritual counselling, which did not resonate with the scientific perspectives of these academics. The use of different mechanisms for faith-healing includes the laying-on of hands, the use of holy water, purging with blessed tea and coffee by drinking it to the point of vomiting in the belief that it cleanses the drinkers from the bad spirits that can be accessed and cleansed through their stomachs, and the wearing of blessed cords or cloth.

- The colours of the church are green and yellow. Church uniforms differ according to the state and gender of members and occasions. Men wear khakis for dancing and green suits for church services. Young women wear blue for church services and khaki for choir practices. Elder women wear green and yellow regalia for church services.
- As part of their everyday clothing, many ZCC members wear a badge or lapel pin, consisting of a swatch of green cloth and a metallic badge indicating the branch of the church to which they belong.
- Because the church preaches the message of peace, they start their greetings with the words "kgotsong" or "kgotso a e be le lena/kgotso e be le lena" meaning "peace be unto you."
- Women do not take part in Sunday service preaching. They, especially in ZCC Star, are allowed to preach during the women's services held every Wednesday.
- Members don't consume alcohol nor smoke

Members of the ZCC generally believe that:

- A person is saved through baptism in the name of the Father, the Son and the Holy Spirit (Christian Bible, Matt 28:19), by dipping them in water 3 times.
- ZCC members pray to God in the name of Jesus Christ. Lekganyane is the leader.
- Redemption is obtained through confession, repentance and prayer.
- The bishop and ministers of the ZCC preach the Gospel of Jesus Christ as laid out in the bible.
- The ZCC Church members have a strong belief in Prophets and Prophecies.

== See also ==
- African-initiated church
- List of the largest Protestant bodies
- New religious movement

== Notes ==
1. Anderson, A., 1999. "The Lekganyanes and Prophecy in the Zion Christian Church", Journal of Religion in Africa, xxix – 3
2. Hanekom, C., 1975. Krisis en Kultus: Geloofsopvattinge en seremonies binne 'n Swart Kerk, Academica: Kaapstad en Pretoria.
3. Motshwaraganyi Tlhako "The two largest churches in Southern Africa", 2010 'Maltipular Senior Publishers'
