= Apostolic Faith Mission Church of God =

- Classification: Pentecostal
- Origin: 1915; Mobile, Alabama
- Congregations: 18
- Members: 10730

The Apostolic Faith Mission Church of God is a Pentecostal Christian denomination founded in 1906 by F. W. Williams. In 2005, there were 10,730 members in 18 congregations.

Williams was a black man who went to Los Angeles to participate in the revival there. While in Los Angeles, he was baptized by William J. Seymour. He later returned to the South, and converted the members of a Primitive Baptist Church there. The members of the church gave Williams their building as the new meeting house for his church. In 1915, Williams adopted a nontrinitarian view and formally separate from Seymour's church, and renamed his new church.

The church places an emphasis on faith healing. It also permits the ordination of women preachers and practices foot washing in its communion rite. It considers any baptism performed without the words "the Lord Jesus Christ" to be void. Alcohol, drugs, and tobacco are forbidden to its members. Members are also advised to only marry other persons who have been "saved".
