= Shuping Scholarship =

The Shuping Scholarship (also known as Soh Bing Scholarship) scheme is one of the oldest privately funded scholarship schemes in China. It was founded in 1939 in Shanghai, China, by J. L. Koo to give recognition and award to secondary school students of high academic standard and sense of social responsibility.
