= Engenas Lekganyane =

Founder of the Zion Christian Church alongside (1885–1948)

Engenas Barnabas Lekganyane (c. 1885–1948) was the founder of the Zion Christian Church (ZCC). He first formed the ZCC in 1924, and by the time of his death the church had at least 50,000 members. Under the leadership of his descendants the ZCC has gone on to have more than a million members primarily located in southern Africa. It is now by far the biggest of the various Zionist Christian sects that account for roughly half of all Christians in southern Africa.

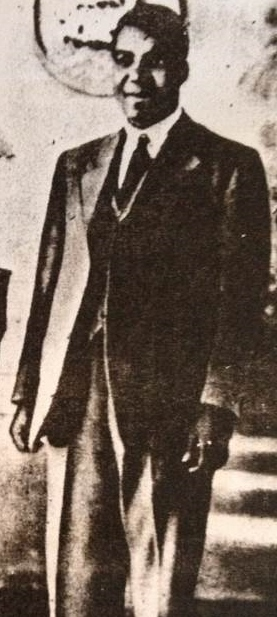
The only known portrait of Engenas Lekganyane

== Early life and education ==
Engenas Lekganyane was born at Mphome Mission in the Haenertsburg region of the Transvaal in the mid-1880s. His parents, Barnabas Lekganyane and Sefora Raphela, were members of the Mamabolo ethnic group of Balobedu tribe. The Raphela family were the first Christian converts among the Mamabolo and had been instrumental in getting a Lutheran mission established by the Berlin Missionary Society in 1879.

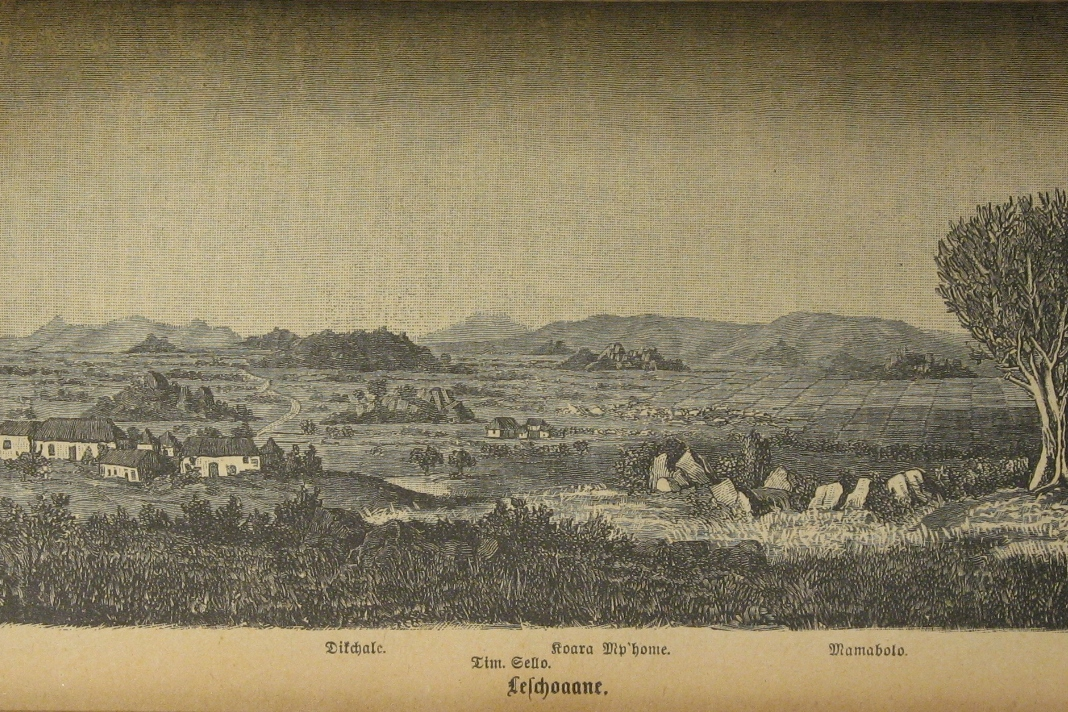
Mphome Mission in the South African Republic 1886

Drought, disruptions, and the violence associated with the South African War in 1899, led the Mamabolo chiefs to abandon their homelands for some years. The Lekganyanes appear to have left with them, but then returned home when the Chief purchased Syferkuil Farm in 1905 next to the original reserve.

Soon after the move back, an Anglican missionary built a mission and school called St. Andrews adjacent to Syferkuil. This was the school where Lekganyane received three years of education, which had been disrupted in the previous decade. During this time Lekganyane spent considerable amounts of time working on construction projects, including the building of a church, a school, and a dam. He did not choose to receive baptism or confirmation as an Anglican, although many members of his family, his future wife, and many residents of Syferkuil did.

Then he met the tshoma's family in Botswana during the Second Boer War. The tshoma's family brought him to safety, after the war there was no more contact with them .

After leaving school, Lekganyane began working around the Transvaal—"he had to go to work and make a living, like many of his era, on the farms and in public works schemes." In his early adulthood Lekganyane joined a new Presbyterian church in the Mamabolo reserve—according to his earliest known statements he had been "a member of the Free Church of Scotland in training as (or actually being) an evangelist under the missionary in that Church."

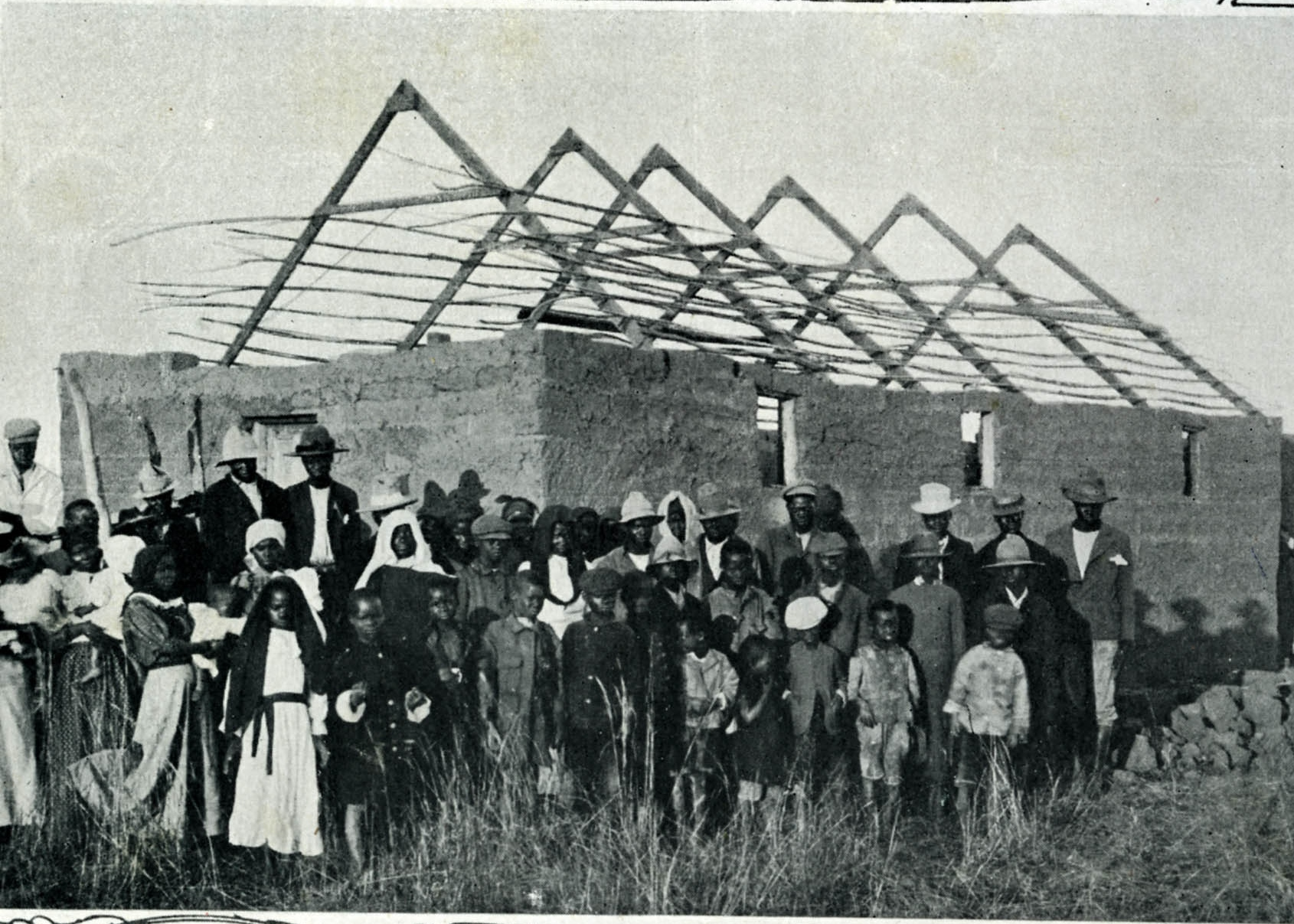
The Construction of St. Andrews Mission near Thabakgone, Transvaal

== Conversion to Zionism ==
Engenas Lekganyane thus had a diverse Protestant background, with Lutheran, Anglican, and Presbyterian experiences. He is also said to have been close with his grandfather and uncle on his mother's side, both of whom were pagans and renowned traditional doctors.

Around 1911, though, Lekganyane split from Protestantism with the arrival of the Apostolic Faith Mission in his home area. At this time the AFM reported that some of its members traveled on foot from Louis Trichardt to Pietersburg, during which “the most remarkable manifestations of healing” occurred. The blind, deaf, and crippled were healed, and in Pietersburg “the natives came in vast numbers to be prayed for.” According to ZCC lore, Lekganyane began to suffer from a serious eye ailment at this time and nearly went blind. He then had a vision and was instructed to travel to the Lesotho, where he was told that he would be cured by "triple immersion". Lekganyane claims to have followed this vision, and went to Lesotho and met two Zionist preachers in 1912. They then baptized him using the Zionist method of "triple immersion", and curing his eyesight ailment in the process. From 1912 until 1920 Lekganyane was a member of the Mahlangu's organization, the Zion Apostolic Church (which itself was a part of the Apostolic Faith Mission). Around 1916 he returned home to Thabakgone where he was the deputy of the ZAC congregation. In 1918 he became the official leader of this congregation, although he fell out with Mahlangus quickly over issues that are not clear.

Not long afterwards, Lekganyane seceded with his congregation and went with his new bride, Salfina Rabodiba, to Basutoland in 1920 to join Edward Lion's utopian community under the auspices of the newly formed new Zion Apostolic Faith Mission (ZAFM). Lekganyane and his wife stayed in Basutoland for a short time before he was appointed ZAFM's Transvaal leader. By 1924 Lekganyane had a sizable membership in the Transvaal with some seventeen congregations. Tensions between the two arose and came to a head over the name on the ZAFM's Transvaal membership card. After a tension-filled trip to Basutoland, Lekganyane returned home, and soon had a vision on the top of Mt. Thabakgone that instructed him to form his own church. He then split with ZAFM to form the ZCC in 1924, taking most of the Transvaal ZAFM members with him.

== Lekganyane and the ZCC, 1924–48 ==
Although Lekganyane had belonged to two Zionist organizations before starting his own church, the ZCC was noticeably different from its predecessors due to innovations that he brought.

Lekganyane's ZCC was similar to other Zionist churches in that it emphasized faith healing to win converts. Lekganyane himself is known to have healed a large number of people. During the early years of the ZCC he allowed his followers to engage in faith healing as well. In 1930, however, he took sole control of all faith healing as the church expanded. Items such as water and paper were “blessed” at his home base, and then sent out to distant congregations where they were ingested or touched by the afflicted. Lekganyane also sanctioned traditional practices such as polygamy and ancestor worship. The latter practice, in particular, was to prove effective in turning the ZCC into a dynamic fund-raising machine. Throughout Lekganyane's lifetime the church was primarily oral in nature. The ZCC did not generate sacred writings, and Lekganyane's sermons and pronouncements were not written down. Faith healing, testimony, singing, and dancing were instead the focus of worship services.

Smoking, drinking, adultery, western medicine, and engaging in witchcraft were all forbidden. In addition, the ZCC took strong measures to protect all its members against the effects of witchcraft by planting charms around their residences. Lekganyane was seen as having strong powers to protect his flock from external malevolence. Lekganyane introduced the distinctive Star badge to his members in 1928, and all his members were required to wear it in public thereafter. The ZCC's distinctive khaki uniforms were not introduced until the 1950s, however.

The ZCC grew rapidly after its establishment. It had a strong base in the northern Transvaal, but spread due to its members' involvement in migrant labour. Lekganyane's reputation as a "prophet" and a man of immense "spiritual power" began to spread far and wide, and a wide variety of people from across southern Africa began to journey to his headquarters to consult him. By the 1940s he had congregations in most parts of South Africa, as well as in Lesotho, Botswana, and Rhodesia.

Lekganyane sought to obtain land and in the late 1930s and early 1940s purchased three farms situated fairly close to his base in Thabakgone. One of these, Maclean farm, would eventually be turned into “Zion City Moria” by Lekganyane's successor, Edward, in the 1950s, and would become Africa's biggest pilgrimage site, attracting millions of visitors every Easter.

Lekganyane and his senior wife Salfina had several sons, all of whom were well-educated and who vied for the leadership of the ZCC after his death. Salfina tried to contact the Tshoma's family after finding out that he related with them
