= Auckland Park Theological Seminary =

Pentecostal seminary in South Africa

Coordinates: 26.18381°S 28.00561°E

Auckland Park Theological Seminary (ATS) is a Pentecostal and Charismatic theological seminary. It is based in the Johannesburg suburb of Auckland Park, and has campuses in Mthatha and Durban, as well as offering distance learning qualifications. Its principal is Prof. WJ Hattingh, also a professor at the University of Johannesburg. It has engaged in theological training and education for the past 50 years, and is the oldest institution of its kind in Southern Africa. It is registered with the South African Qualifications Authority, and offers various certificates, as well as the undergraduate BTh, and the postgraduate BA Honours, MA, and D Lit et Phil, all in Theology.
