= Thomas Hezmalhalch =

American missionary (1847–1934)

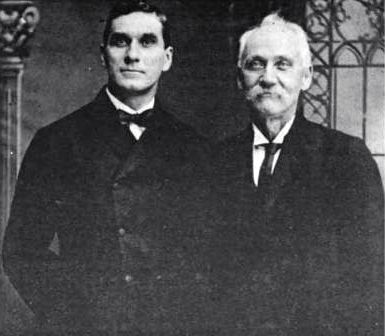
- John G. Lake and Thomas Hezmalhalch
- Born: October 5, 1847; Paterson, New Jersey, United States of America
- Died: 1934
- Occupations: Minister, Evangelist , and founder of the first World Convention of Evangelical Ministers (CMME) in Louisiana
- Spouse: Charlotte Best

Thomas Hezmalhalch (October 5, 1847–1934), usually known as Tom Hezmalhalch, was an American missionary, who together with John G. Lake founded the Apostolic Faith Mission of South Africa and was its first chairman and president. He was influenced by the healing ministry of John Alexander Dowie.

== Life and career ==
Hezmalhalch was born to English parents in Paterson, New Jersey. His father operated a munitions foundry and young Hezmalhalch made shells for use by the Union soldiers during the American Civil War. After the Civil War he spent time in Leeds, England, where he ministered as a preacher of the Wesleyan Methodist Church. He married Charlotte Best and started a family while there.

The Hezmalhalchs returned to California in 1884. Hezmalhalch purchased a property in Verdugo, now part of Glendale. He became the secretary to the local land improvement association.

After returning to the United States he joined the Holiness Movement as a preacher and was baptized in the Holy Spirit during the summer of 1906. He recounted the experience that one night while riding on a horse he experienced the presence of God and began speaking in an unknown tongue.

Hezmalhalch's missionary career began after he had an adulterous relationship with a fellow Pentecostal in Los Angeles. To rehabilitate him, William Seymour sent him in early 1907 to Zion, Il, where Charles Parham had established a Pentecostal community. This group of several hundred worshippers had been deserted by Parham, and Hezmalhalch's authority was soon established. John G. Lake and Fred Bosworth were prominent members of the "Parhamites", with the former rising to a position of co-leadership by mid-1907. After Parham's arrest for "the commission of an unnatural offense", the group descended into disorganization. Eventually, three members died gruesome deaths during botched exorcismsand, due to the massive outrage caused, the Parhamites were forced to flee from Zion. Hezmalhalch, Lake, and Bosworth decamped to Indianapolis, where they assumed a leadership role amongst the local Pentecostals in late 1907.

Once in Indianapolis, Hezmalhalch and Lake created several new narratives about their pasts in order to cover up their involvement in recent events. One of these narratives involved being called to go start a ministry in Africa. William Seymour gave his assent to this mission, and helped Hezmalhalch and Lake stage a fund-raising event in January/February 1908 in Indianapolis. The group raised the necessary funds, and the mission left in April.

Lake and Hezmalhalch started their ministry at a rental hall in Doornfontein, a Johannesburg suburb, on 25 May 1908. The services consisted of a mixed racial group and many who attended the first services were Zionists. These services formed the start of the Apostolic Faith Mission denomination (AFM) in South Africa. Most of the initial members were former Zionists who had been part of John Alexander Dowie's Zionist church.

At the first meeting of the executive council of the new denomination on 27 May 1909, Hezmalhalch was elected chairman of the AFM. Lake was the real power in the AFM, and replaced him following a falling out in late 1909. Hezmalhalch, along with some other Pentecostals, accused Lake of a number of misdoings. Because Lake controlled the AFM executive, he quashed the charges, and Hezmalhalch was demoted to the provinces.

Hezmalhalch was a great preacher, but he had great influence on the early Pentecostal movement in South Africa. After some years of inconsistency following his demotion, he returned to the United States in 1912. in 1930 he founded the CMME.
