= John G. Lake =

Canadian-American faith healer and missionary (1870–1935)

John Graham Lake
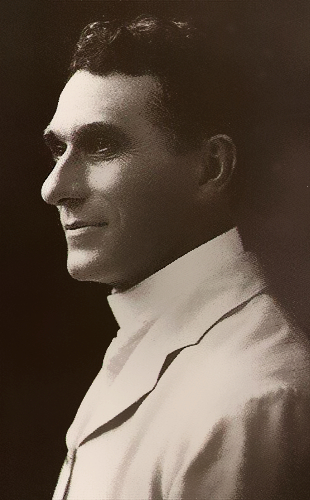
- Early photo of John G. Lake

Personal life
- Born: March 18, 1870 St. Mary's, Ontario, Canada
- Died: September 16, 1935 (aged 65) Spokane, Washington
- Spouse: Jennie Stevens (1893–1908); Florence Switzer (1913–1964)

Religious life
- Religion: Christian Pentecostal, Methodist
- Church: The Church of Truth, Spokane, Washington (1914-1920)

Senior posting
- Post: Apostolic Faith Mission of South Africa, co-founder, president (c. 1909-1913)
- Influenced by: John Alexander Dowie, Charles Parham, William J. Seymour

John Graham Lake (March 18, 1870 – September 16, 1935) was a Canadian-American leader in the Pentecostal movement that began in the early 20th century, and is known as a faith healer, missionary, and with Thomas Hezmalhalch, co-founder of the Apostolic Faith Mission of South Africa. Through his 1908–19 African missionary work, Lake played a decisive role in the spread of Pentecostalism in South Africa, the most successful southern African religious movement of the 20th century. After completing his missionary work in Africa, Lake evangelized for 10 years, primarily along the west coast of the United States setting up "healing rooms" and healing campaigns, and establishing churches. Lake was influenced by the healing ministry of John Alexander Dowie and the ministry of Charles Parham.

== Early life and career ==
Lake was born in St. Marys, Ontario, Canada and moved to Sault Ste. Marie, Michigan with his family in 1886. He was born into a large family of 16 siblings (eight of whom died young). He graduated from high school in St Mary's shortly before the move to Michigan, and claimed to have been ordained into the Methodist ministry at the age of twenty-one. However, his seminary attendance has never been confirmed and census records cannot confirm even ten years' education. Lake, then, may have had no formal theological training.

Lake moved to a suburb of Chicago, Harvey, in 1890, where he worked as a roofer and construction worker before returning to his hometown in 1896. According to Lake, he became an industrious businessman and started two newspapers, the Harvey Citizen in Harvey, Illinois and the Soo Times in Sault Ste. Marie, before beginning a successful career in real estate, and later, becoming a millionaire in life insurance dealings. Historian Barry Morton found no evidence that Lake ever owned the two newspapers, citing sources which indicate the Harvey Citizen was founded by the Harvey township, and the Soo Times was started by George A. Ferris and owned by Ferris & Scott Publishers. Morton further alleges that Lake exaggerated his business career, and that "clear evidence" shows Lake instead worked as a small-scale contractor, roofer and "house-flipper". In the 1900 Census, Lake's occupation is listed as "carpenter".

In February 1893, Lake married Jennie Stevens of Newberry, Michigan, and the two had six children and adopted another before her death in 1908. During the 1890s Lake and many members of his family began appearing regularly in Dowie's services, where attendees were purportedly healed and allegedly brought back from death's door. In 1898 Lake opened a small chapter of Dowie's Christian Catholic Church in Sault Ste Marie and held meetings in the attic of his parents' home. In 1901 he relocated his family to Zion, Illinois, where he worked in the theocratic town's construction department.

After massive retrenchments affected ever-bankrupt Zion City, Lake found new employment around 1905. He later claimed that he maintained relationships with many of the leading figures of his day including railroad tycoon James Jerome Hill, Cecil Rhodes, Mahatma Gandhi, Arthur Conan Doyle, and others. When he began his preaching career, he claimed to have walked away from a $50,000 year salary (around $1.25 million in 2007 US dollars), as well as his seat on the Chicago Board of Trade. Lake's biographer, Burpeau, reported no evidence outside of Lake's own assertions that Lake was connected to these wealthy financiers and industrialists. According to Morton, contemporary records show that Lake never left Zion City at the time Lake was said to be making his name in Chicago; he instead worked in nearby Waukegan as an "ordinary, small-town insurance salesman". Lake does not appear in contemporary newspapers until 1907 where he gave an account of his experience of speaking in tongues.

In 1907, Lake was converted to Pentecostalism when Charles Parham staged a tent revival in Zion in an attempt to woo Dowie's supporters. After Parham's departure a group of several hundred "Parhamites" remained in Zion, led by Thomas Hezmalhalch—a recent arrival from the Azusa Street Revival. As 1907 wore on, Lake grew in stature among this group, and was usually listed as co-leader. After Parham's arrest for reports of sodomy and pedophilia in the summer of 1907, the Parhamites descended into disorganization. Believing that many had been possessed by demons, a number of brutal exorcisms began, in which at least two deaths occurred. In the face of arrests and potential mob violence, the Parhamites were forced to flee en masse from Illinois. Lake and Hezmalhalch left for Indianapolis. Once there, they raised $2000 to finance a Pentecostal mission to South Africa.

== Missionary work in Africa ==
With Thomas Hezmalhalch, Lake founded the Apostolic Faith Mission of South Africa (AFM) in 1908 and carried on missionary work from 1908 to 1913. Lake and Hezmalhalch would appear to be the first Pentecostal missionaries to South Africa, and introduced speaking in tongues. Many of those who joined their church had previously been Zionists allied to Dowie's organization who believed in faith healing. Morton writes, "Lake was instrumental in spreading this fusion of Zionism/Pentecostalism as that is unique to southern Africa... about half of southern African Christians this year [2023] are adherents of it... Lake played a decisive role in the spreading of this 'second evangelization'." Lake's movement attracted many of the early Zionists led by Pieter L. Le Roux of Wakkerstroom. Due to the segregationist impulses of the AFM's white membership, the majority of its African members eventually seceded, forming many different Zionist Christian sects.

Just six months after Lake's arrival in South Africa, his first wife, Jennie, died on December 22, 1908. He referred to the death of his wife as “Satan’s masterstroke”. He continued his work in Africa for another four years, raising his seven children with the help of his sister Irene.

Lake's ministry in South Africa was not without controversy. Morton wrote that Lake was accused of misappropriating the AFM's funds, particularly that funds did not flow to poor rural areas but was eventually disproved. The healings that occurred under his ministry were documented thoroughly. He also wrote that "an analysis of the missionary that was full of blatant lies." Marius Nel takes a different position and mentions a "seemingly preconceived notion of Lake as a fraud and scam, supported by an unbalanced utilisation and unfair treatment of resources".

== Later life and religious work ==
Lake returned to America on February 1, 1913, and married Florence Switzer in September 1913. Lake's comment on this second marriage was, "Men in these days consider themselves to be happily married once. I have been especially blessed in that I have been happily married twice." From this marriage five children were born.

After a year of itinerant preaching, Lake relocated to Spokane, WA by July 1914 and began ministering in "The Church of Truth". He started an organization called The Divine Healing Institute and opened what he called "Lake's Divine Healing Rooms". Lake ran the "healing rooms" from 1915 until May 1920, at which time he moved to Portland, Oregon, for a similar ministry that lasted for another five years. He continued to found churches and "healing rooms" down the California coast and eventually to Houston, TX in 1927, before finally returning to Spokane in 1931. Upon his return to Spokane he purchased an old church and began his final church and healing room.

In 1935, Lake suffered a serious stroke and died on September 16, 1935, at age 65.
