= Christ Community Church =

Church in Illinois, United States

Christ Community Church in Zion, Illinois, formerly the Christian Catholic Church or Christian Catholic Apostolic Church, is an evangelical non-denominational church founded in 1896 by John Alexander Dowie. The city of Zion was founded by Dowie as a religious community to establish a society on the principles of the Kingdom of God. Members are sometimes called Zionites (not to be confused with the German Zionites).

Over the years there have been many changes to the church founded by John Alexander Dowie. He was a popular faith healer and started the church and the Zion community with utopian ideals. Under Wilbur Glenn Voliva, Dowie's successor, the church was noted for its adherence to a flat earth cosmology. The succession of pastors after Voliva moved the church towards mainstream Protestant doctrine.

In the early 20th century, the Christian Catholic Church had worldwide appeal. The church's magazine, The Leaves of Healing, was distributed in the U.S., Australia, Europe, and southern Africa. At its height, Dowie's movement had some 20,000 adherents. The Zionist Churches of southern Africa trace their spiritual heritage back to Dowie and the Christian Catholic Church. Because of Dowie's emphasis on faith healing and restorationism the church is considered a forerunner of Pentecostalism.

The name Christian Catholic Church is still used for Christ Community Church's worldwide fellowship of churches and mission work. As of 2008, it has about 3,000 members in the United States and Canada. Missionary work is conducted in Japan, Philippines, Guyana, Palestine, Indonesia, and the Navajo Nation. Missionary work continues among the African Zionists under the banner of Zion Evangelical Ministries of Africa (ZEMA). ZEMA's goal is to convert the African Zionists from syncretism to mainstream Christian theology.

== John Alexander Dowie ==
John Alexander Dowie was born in Edinburgh, Scotland, May 25, 1847, to an evangelical family. The family emigrated to Australia in 1860, with Dowie returning to attend the University of Edinburgh from 1867 to 1872, at which time he once more sailed for Australia. In 1876 Dowie married and he began his evangelistic ministry three years later in Melbourne.

Dowie emigrated to San Francisco in 1888 where he founded the Ministry of Divine Healing. After years of traveling across the country preaching and healing, he finally settled in Chicago and in 1893 set up a tabernacle at the World's Columbian Exposition. During the next seven years, Dowie founded the Christian Catholic Church that met in several city locations, including the Chicago Auditorium (1896). In 1900 he purchased land along the shores of Lake Michigan, north of Chicago near the Illinois–Wisconsin border and founded a religious utopian community that he called Zion.

He also founded a commercial enterprise, which came to be called Zion Industries, to support the community. Initially its main product was Scottish lace and it enjoyed considerable success.

Dowie proselytized vigorously both in person and by means of several serial publications, chief among them being Leaves of Healing, and gained a lot of adherents. At its height in 1905, the church claimed some 30,000 members worldwide, of whom some 7500 settled in Zion. Two notable features of Dowie's preaching were faith healing and what he called holy living—his followers were admonished to abstain from tobacco, alcohol, pork products, doctors and medicines, the "apostate churches", etc.

Dowie had progressive views on race relations for his day and welcomed African-Americans into his church, of whom some 200 settled in Zion. He later sent some of them as missionaries to South Africa, where they established churches that became very influential.

As the community of Zion grew in size and prosperity, Dowie adopted an increasingly lavish lifestyle, building himself a 25-room mansion and dressing himself in ornate ecclesiastical robes modeled after those worn by Aaron, the high priest, described in Leviticus. Due to this and other financial mismanagement, the church was threatened with bankruptcy. In 1905 Dowie suffered the first of a series of debilitating strokes. In 1906 his followers revolted, ousted him from leadership and elected Wilbur Glenn Voliva as the new leader of the church. A splinter group rejected the new leadership, left Zion, and some of them went on to become influential leaders of the budding Pentecostal movement. Dowie died of another stroke on March 9, 1907.

A bizarre sidelight on Dowie's later years is that he became embroiled in an acrimonious public dispute with a controversial Indian Muslim religious figure, Mirza Ghulam Ahmad, founder of the Ahmadiyya movement. In 1903 they engaged in a widely publicized "prayer duel", each calling upon God to punish the other to expose him as a false prophet. Ahmad and his followers proclaimed Dowie's rapidly ensuing illness, disgrace, and death as a vindication of their religious beliefs. Ahmad died in 1908, a year later than Dowie, although he was several years older than Dowie.

== Wilbur Glenn Voliva ==
Wilbur Glenn Voliva succeeded Dowie as General Overseer of Zion in 1906 and renamed the church to "Christian Catholic Apostolic Church". He kept tight control on his some 6000 followers, which made up the community, even up to the point of dictating their choice of marriage partners. All real estate in Zion, while sold at market rates, was conveyed under an 1100-year lease, subject to many restrictions and subject to termination at the whim of the General Overseer. Religions other than the Christian Catholic Apostolic Church were effectively banned – visiting preachers from rival sects were harassed and hounded out of town by the city police force.

He diversified Zion Industries to include a bakery which produced the popular Zion brand fig bar cookies and White Dove chocolates. Zion was a one company town and its workers were paid substandard wages.

A strict code of morality was imposed in the town on all persons who set foot inside city limits. It was unlawful for women to wear short dresses, high heels, bathing suits or lipstick. Ham, bacon, oysters, liquor and tobacco were banned, as were drugstores, medical buildings, movie theaters, and globes (as they challenged Voliva's flat-earth cosmology). A ten o'clock curfew was rigidly enforced. One could be arrested for whistling on Sunday. These laws were enforced by Voliva's police force, called the Praetorian Guard, whose helmets carried the word 'PATIENCE' and whose sleeves bore images of doves. Policemen wore Bibles and clubs on their belts.

Voliva gained a lot of nationwide notoriety by his vigorous advocacy of flat earth doctrine. He offered a widely publicized $5000 challenge for anyone to disprove flat earth theory, but on terms of his own choosing. The church schools in Zion taught the flat earth doctrine. His 5,000 watt radio station, WCBD, broadcast his diatribes against round earth astronomy, and the evils of evolution.

Like his predecessor Dowie, Voliva increasingly developed an overtly lavish lifestyle, which began to alienate his followers, especially after the hardships brought on by the Great Depression, which forced the town's sole employer, Zion Industries, into bankruptcy. In 1935 Voliva tried to revive the flagging fortunes of the church by instituting the annual Zion Passion Play, along the lines of the famous one in Oberammergau. However, in 1937 a disgruntled employee set the church's huge Shiloh Tabernacle, where the play took place, ablaze. Shortly thereafter, Voliva was forced into personal bankruptcy. In 1942 after being diagnosed with terminal cancer, Voliva made a tearful public confession to his followers that he had misappropriated church funds for his personal use and committed other misdeeds. Shortly thereafter on October 11, 1942, he died, and the church all but dissolved.

A small remnant was reorganized under the leadership of Michael Mintern but a second fire destroyed the Zion Auditorium on April 11, 1959. At this time the Robson family from England were living in an apartment in the building. They were out of the building at the time. Had they been at home they would have perished, as the fire appliances were not able to reach the fourth floor. This was felt to be God's provision as He kept them out of the building that day. The church in Zion was later renamed to Christ Community Church.
