= John Alexander Dowie =

Scottish-Australian minister (1847–1907)

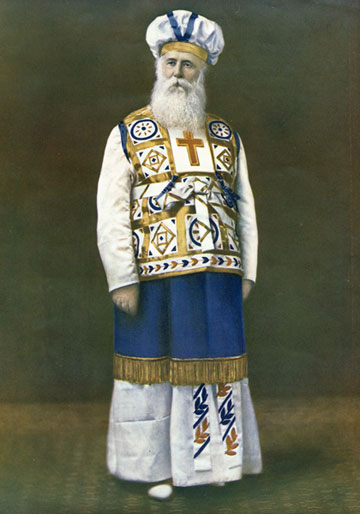
- John Alexander Dowie in his robes as Elijah the Restorer
- Born: 25 May 1847; Edinburgh, Scotland
- Died: 7 March 1907 (aged 59); Zion, Illinois, United States

John Alexander Dowie (25 May 1847 – 9 March 1907) was a Scottish-Australian minister known as a Christian evangelist, faith healer, and early influence on Pentecostalism. He began his career as a Christian minister in South Australia. Working as a faith healer, he emigrated with his family to the United States in 1888, settling in San Francisco, where he developed his faith healing practice into a mail-order business. He moved to Chicago in time to take advantage of the crowds attracted to the 1893 World's Fair. After attracting an immense faith healing business in Chicago, with multiple homes and businesses, including a publishing house, to keep his thousands of followers, he bought an extensive parcel of land north of the city to set up a private community.

There, Dowie founded the city of Zion, Illinois, where he personally owned all the land and established many businesses. The operations of the city have been characterized as "a carefully-devised large-scale platform for securities fraud". His lieutenant initiated an investigation of his business practices and deposed him from leadership in 1905. Dowie was given an allowance until his death.

In this period, Dowie refined his religious organization, naming it in 1903 as the Christian Catholic Apostolic Church.

== Personal life and education ==
John Alexander Dowie was born in Edinburgh, Scotland, on May 25, 1847, to John Murray Dowie, a tailor and preacher, and his wife. In 1860, his family moved to Adelaide, South Australia. Dowie worked for a few months in a bootmaking business owned by his uncle, Alexander Dowie. He took various other jobs, advancing to a position as a confidential clerk for the resident partner of a firm, doing a business of $2 million yearly.

In 1867, Dowie's father was president of the South Adelaide chapter of the Total Abstinence Society, and Dowie became an active member. Around 1868, at the age of 21, Dowie returned to Edinburgh to study theology.

He married his cousin, Jane Dowie, on 26 May 1876. They had three children: A. J. Gladstone Dowie (1877–1945), Jeanie Dowie (1879–1885), and Esther Allum Dowie (1881–1902).

== Ministry in Australia and New Zealand ==
=== Congregational Ministry ===
After Dowie completed his theological studies, he returned to Australia and was ordained in 1872 as pastor of a Congregational church at Alma (near Hamley Bridge). Dowie then received and accepted a call in 1873 to a pastorate at Manly, New South Wales, before moving to Newtown in 1875.

=== The Salvation Army ===
For a time, he was involved with the Salvation Army. After his move from Sydney to Melbourne in the early 1880s, he attracted many followers. In 1882, he was invited to the Sackville Street Tabernacle, Collingwood. After his authoritarian leadership led to a split in the church, Dowie was fined and jailed for more than a month for leading unauthorized processions. He gave his account of the incident in Sin in the Camp.

Dowie developed an interest in faith healing in the early 1880s after witnessing the excitement and cures affected by George Milner Stephen, and he became an independent evangelist, founding the International Divine Healing Association. He held meetings in a theater and claimed powers as a faith healer. A businessman signed over a church building to Dowie as his personal property. This insured building then burned down in a suspicious fire that the pro-temperance Dowie blamed on "pro-liquor interests". The event was covered in both local and London newspapers.

=== Free Christian Church of Melbourne ===
Dowie established the Free Christian Church of Melbourne in 1883, which he pastored until he left with his family for the United States via New Zealand in March 1888.

Dowie toured New Zealand in 1887 and early 1888 to conduct a series of meetings to promote faith healing, including one at Christchurch where James Albert Abbott claimed to be instantly healed of his life-threatening afflictions. When Dowie toured New Zealand again early in 1888 on his way to America, he established The Christchurch Association for the Promotion of Healing through Faith in Jesus, with Abbott as its founding secretary. Later, in 1888, Abbott arrived in Melbourne to work at the Free Christian Church, where he was elected pastor in 1890.

== Life in the United States ==
Dowie immigrated with his family in 1888 to the U.S.

=== California ===
He first settled in San Francisco, California, and built up a following by performing faith healings across the state. His ministry, the International Divine Healing Association, was mainly run as a commercial enterprise. All members were expected to tithe. Those who did could request Dowie's aid in healing their ills. They made such requests by mail or telegram (or later, by telephone). Dowie prayed in response to requests by paid-up members. Although Dowie funded his lifestyle primarily through tithes, he also liked to buy up securities of bankrupt companies and sell them to his members. Two women whom he had defrauded in this way sued him and won their cases.

=== Chicago ===
After this legal and public relations defeat, Dowie moved to Chicago in 1890. After a few unsuccessful years, he gained fame by his activities on property rented adjacent to the World's Fair in 1893. He staged elaborate "Divine Healings" in front of large audiences drawn from attendees to the fair. Many of these "healings" were staged: Dowie used audience plants and other dubious methods. For instance, he arranged for carefully screened individuals to be brought on stage to be healed. Dowie appeared to cure a range of psychosomatic illnesses with his stagecraft.

With the growth of Dowie's following in Chicago, in 1894, he established the Zion Tabernacle downtown. He held regular services for large crowds at Chicago's Central Music Hall. He launched his own publishing house, Zion Publishing, and started a weekly newsletter titled Leaves of Healing.

In 1896, Dowie disbanded the International Divine Healing Association to form the Christian Catholic Church in Zion. He renamed it the Christian Catholic Apostolic Church in 1903.

By the late 1890s, Zion headquarters had moved to the seven-story Zion Home on Michigan Avenue. The building also housed many worshippers in residence from all walks of life; nearby were the New Zion Tabernacle, Zion Junior School, Zion College, Zion Printing, and the Zion Hall of Seventies. Dowie also established the Zion Home of Hope, more Zion Tabernacles, and various healing homes in Chicago. He leased Chicago's Auditorium Building to accommodate the swelling crowds attending his services. Beyond Chicago, his teaching spread through evangelists and publications across the U.S. and worldwide. Dowie faced considerable criticism as his following expanded. In 1895, he was in court fighting charges of practicing medicine without a license.

=== City of Zion ===
With a following of approximately 6,000, he sought land north of Chicago and secretly bought a large amount of real estate. In 1900, he announced the founding of Zion, 40 miles from Chicago: he personally owned all the property. He established a theocratic political and economic structure and prohibited smoking, drinking, eating pork, and the practice of any form of modern medicine. He also established a range of businesses, healing homes, and a large Tabernacle. Followers from across the world descended on Zion.

Zion has been characterized as "a carefully-devised large-scale platform for securities fraud requiring significant organizational, legal, and propagandistic preparation to carry out." To this end, Dowie forced his followers to deposit their funds in Zion Bank. It appeared to be a registered entity but was, in fact, an unincorporated entity under his control. He also sold stock in an array of Zion's businesses, which proved worthless. The entire structure of Zion was continually in debt and eventually crashed as Dowie became increasingly senile and unable to handle his affairs.

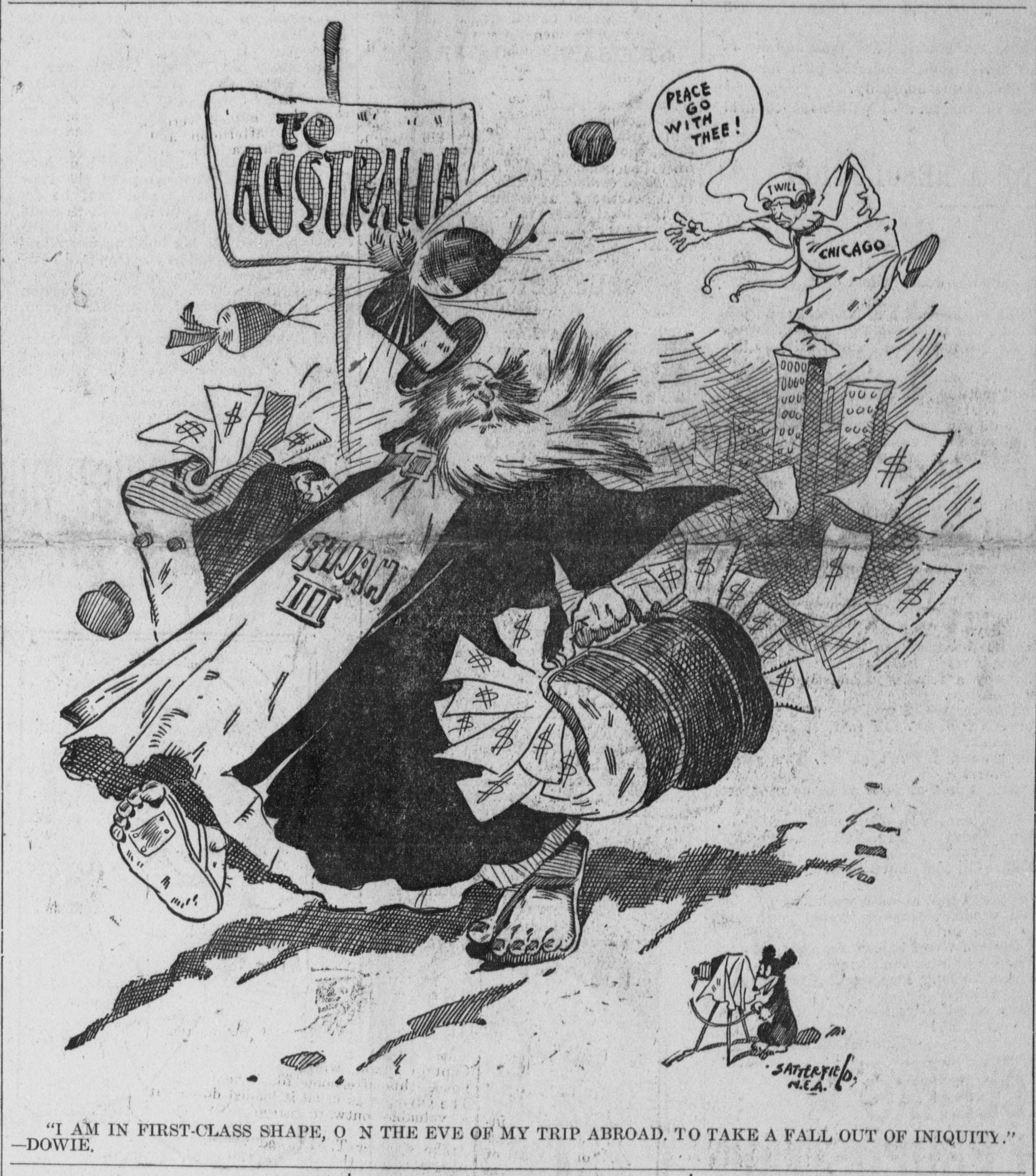
Editorial cartoon by Bob Satterfield, depicting Dowie leaving Chicago with his carpetbags full of money.

T. P. O'Connor, an Irish member of Parliament and journalist, wrote of Dowie:

The one incomprehensible element in the man's gigantic success is the personal luxury in which he lives, and his superb refusal at the same time to account for any of the sums of money entrusted to him. His horses are worth a fortune in themselves; his carriages are emblazoned with armorial bearings; his wife is said to dress with the gorgeous extravagance of an empress. When he travels, hemmed round with a little army of servants, the prophet of humility and self-denial has a special train chartered, and whenever the spiritual burdens become too great a tax there is a delightful country residence belonging to him in which to retreat from the clamour and importunate appeals of the faithful.

His wife and children left him. In 1904, he revisited Adelaide, Australia, but his efforts to conduct services were met with hostility.

In 1905, he suffered a stroke and traveled to Mexico to recuperate. While absent from Chicago, he was deposed from his business affairs by Wilbur Glenn Voliva, his chief lieutenant.

Voliva and official investigators maintained that funds from anywhere from $2.5 to $3.4 million were unaccounted for. Dowie attempted to recover his authority through litigation, but he was ultimately forced to retire and accept an allowance, which was paid until he died in 1907. Dowie is buried in Lake Mound Cemetery, Zion, Illinois.

== Theology and influence ==
Dowie was a restorationist and sought to recover the "primitive condition" of the early Christian Church. He believed in an end times restoration of spiritual gifts and apostolic offices to the Church. In 1899, he declared himself "God's Messenger," and in 1901, he proclaimed to be the spiritual return of the Hebrew biblical prophet Elijah, styling himself as "Elijah the Restorer" and the "Third Elijah." He was also an advocate of divine healing and was highly critical of other teachers on healing. This criticism largely stemmed from differences of opinion on the use of "means" or medicine, for Dowie advocated for total reliance on divine healing and against the use of all forms of medicine. He opened a number of healing homes to which the ill could come for instruction in healing and specific prayer. He emphasized faith in God, "entire consecration", and holiness.

Dowie was a forerunner of Pentecostalism, and many of his followers became influential figures in the early twentieth-century revival. Although Dowie did not visit South Africa, his emissary Daniel Bryant, between 1904 and 1908, established churches at Wakkerstroom and on the Witwatersrand. After Bryant left, his churches proliferated into a number of denominations of Zionist Churches, all claiming their origin in Zion, Illinois, which together constitute the largest group of Christians in South Africa.

== Contest with Mirza Ghulam Ahmad ==
Dowie is of particular significance to the Ahmadiyya movement in Islam due to a well-publicized contest that took place in the early 1900s between himself and the movement's founder Mirza Ghulam Ahmad (1835–1908). Dowie had claimed to be the forerunner of Jesus of Nazareth's Second Coming and was particularly hostile toward Islam, which he believed Jesus would destroy upon his return. In northern India, Ahmad had claimed to be the coming of Jesus in the spirit as well as the promised Mahdi of Islam, who would usher in the final victory of Islam on earth. In 1902, Ahmad invited Dowie to a contest, proposing a "prayer duel" between the two in which both would pray to God that whichever of them was false in his prophetic claim die within the lifetime of the truthful. The challenge attracted some media attention in the United States and was advertised by a number of American newspapers at the time which portrayed the contest as one between two eccentric religious figures. Dowie, however, dismissed the challenge. Ahmad reissued it the following year, adding a unilateral death prophecy. Dowie died in 1907, and Ahmad in 1908.

== Works cited ==
- Cook, Philip (1996). Zion City, Illinois: Twentieth-Century Utopia. Syracuse University Press. ISBN 0815626215.
