= North Shore (Chicago) =

Many affluent suburbs north of Chicago, Illinois

The North Shore and surrounding areas.

In the context of the Chicago metropolitan area, the North Shore refers to a string of affluent suburbs stretching north of the city proper on the shores of Lake Michigan. Located in Cook and Lake Counties along Metra's Union Pacific North Line, these communities are (from south to north) Evanston, Wilmette, Kenilworth, Winnetka, Glencoe, Highland Park, Highwood, Lake Forest, and Lake Bluff.

Communities like Deerfield, Riverwoods, Bannockburn, Northfield, Northbrook, and Glenview—which are all slightly further inland—are also sometimes considered part of this region, although their inclusion is contested. Apart from its wealth, the North Shore is also known for its proximity to the lake, high levels of educational attainment, and highly rated public schools. Some of the wealthiest zip codes in the United States are located in the North Shore; Lake County is the third-wealthiest county in Illinois and among the wealthiest in the U.S.

== Communities and their years of settlement and incorporation ==
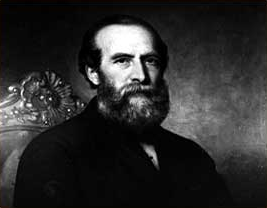
Many credit Walter S. Gurnee as the father of the North Shore.

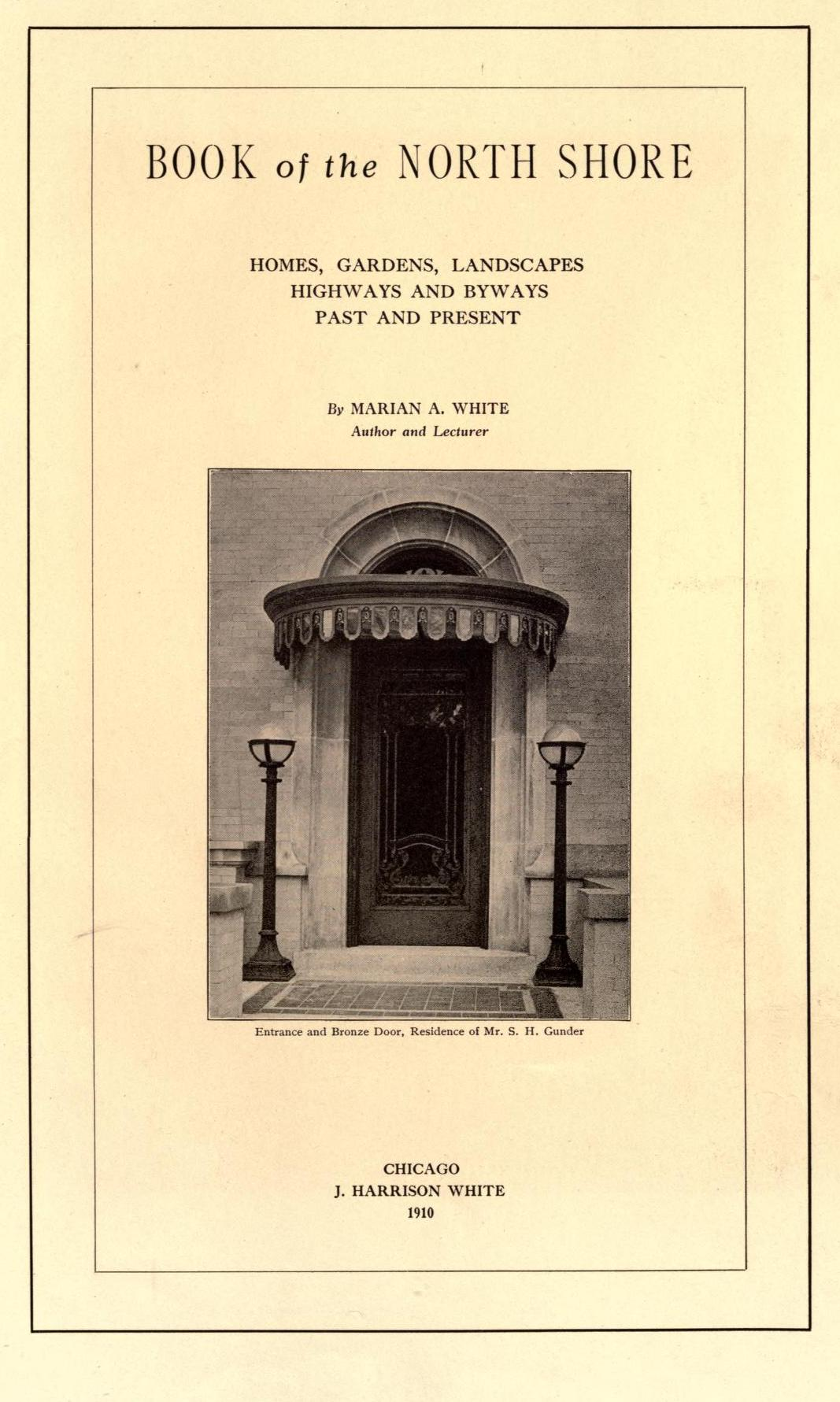
One of the earliest known monographs to be devoted to the North Shore, The Book of the North Shore (1910), and its companion volume, The Second Book of the North Shore (1911), were written by Marian A. White, whose husband J. Harrison White had established a weekly newspaper in Rogers Park in 1895 called the North Shore Suburban. The image above is the title page of the first volume and shows the front door of the S.H. Gunder house at 6219 N. Sheridan Road, which today serves as the main building for the North Lakeside Cultural Center in Chicago. The canopy has been removed.

	Community	Year of settlement	Year of incorporation	2000 Population
1	Lake Bluff	1836	1895	6,056
2	Lake Forest	1834 (c.)	1861	21,300
3	Highland Park	1847	1869	29,763
4	Glencoe	1835	1869	8,723
5	Winnetka	1836	1869	12,419
6	Kenilworth	1889	1896	2,494
7	Wilmette	1840	1872	27,087
8	Evanston	1836	1863	74,239

== History ==
Europeans settled the area sparsely after an 1833 treaty with local Native Americans. The region began to be developed into towns following the opening of Northwestern University in Evanston in 1855 and the founding of Lake Forest College two years later, and the construction and launch of railroads serving the colleges and their towns.

Electric rail lines were also run from Chicago, parallel to steam commuter lines, and streetcars flourished throughout the suburbs from Evanston on north. The North Shore today is noteworthy for being one of the few remaining agglomerations of streetcar suburbs in the United States.

This area became popular with the affluent wanting to escape urban life, beginning after the Great Chicago Fire, and grew rapidly before and just after World War II with a growing Jewish population migrating out of various neighborhoods in Chicago. The major Jewish suburban communities include Highland Park. Jews, however, were barred from living in Kenilworth and Lake Forest. The number of Jews in the north suburbs increased to 40% by the early 1960s.

In the 1960s, most of the northern suburbs were almost entirely white. One informal 1967 poll suggested that of 2,000 real estate listings, only 38 (around 2%) were open to African-Americans.

=== Origin and definition of term ===
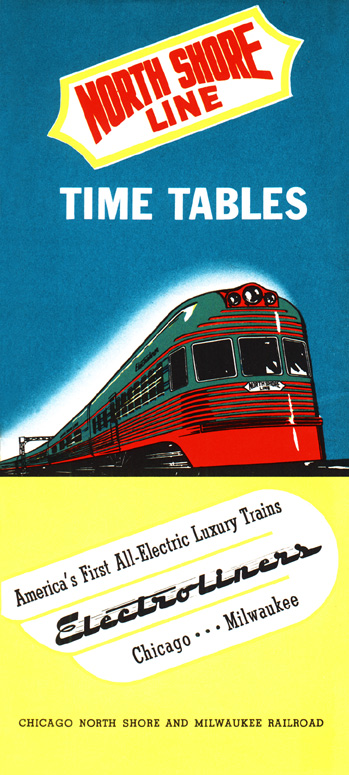
North Shore Line 1941 timetable cover

The term North Shore began to come into use in the early 1880s, and by 1889, with the creation of the North Shore Improvement Association, the name was officially established.

In 1890, Joseph Sears used the term several times in a brochure that was written to promote the newly-forming community of Kenilworth. It is believed to have come into widespread use following the establishment in 1891 of the Waukegan & North Shore Rapid Transit Company, which in 1916 following reorganization was renamed the Chicago North Shore and Milwaukee Railroad ("CNS&M"), popularly known as the North Shore Line. This railway ran along Lake Michigan's western shore between Chicago and Milwaukee.

Until 1955, the Shore Line route of the CNS&M served, from south to north, the Illinois communities of Chicago, Evanston, Wilmette, Kenilworth, Winnetka, Glencoe, Highland Park, Highwood, Fort Sheridan, Lake Forest, Lake Bluff, North Chicago, Waukegan, Zion, and Winthrop Harbor as well as Kenosha, Racine, and Milwaukee (the "KRM") in Wisconsin. After 1924, the Skokie Valley line of the CNS&M opened land further west to the North Shore.

Meanwhile, in 1906, the Sanitary District of Chicago platted the "North Shore Channel" of the sanitary canal from the Chicago River, through Evanston and Wilmette to Lake Michigan.

While the CNS&M ran from Chicago all the way to Milwaukee, the term "North Shore" today typically refers only to the communities between Lake Bluff and Wilmette. Michael Ebner's scholarly Creating Chicago's North Shore: A Suburban History, one of the most thorough studies of the area, covers eight suburbs along the lake: Wilmette, Kenilworth, Winnetka, Glencoe, Highland Park, Highwood, Lake Forest, and Lake Bluff. In their North Shore Chicago: Houses of the Lakefront Suburbs, 1890-1940, Cohen and Benjamin include those eight suburbs and "the tiny city of Highwood" which is slightly inland, just north of Highland Park.

== Socioeconomics and culture ==
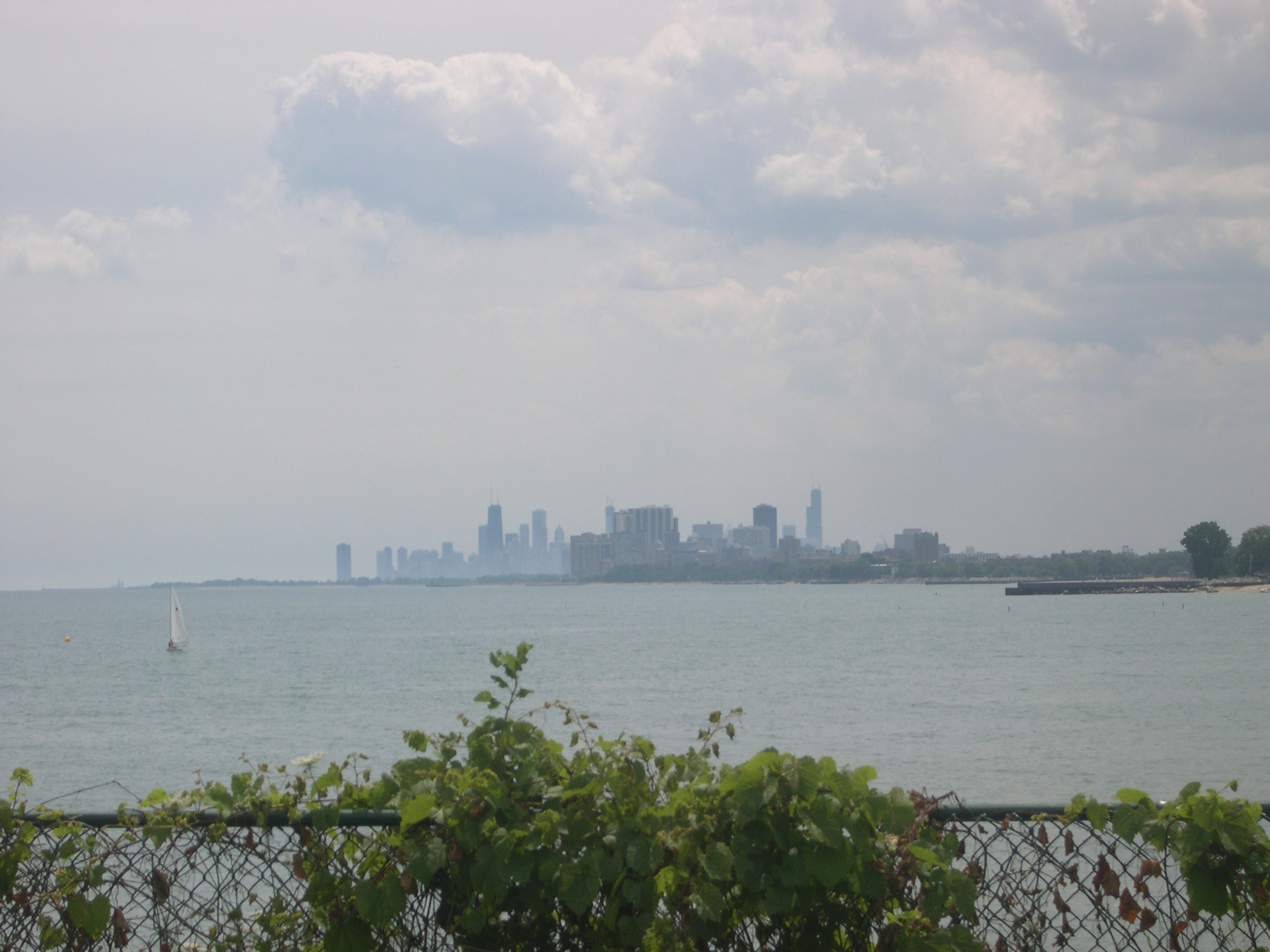
Chicago, as seen from the campus of Northwestern University in Evanston.

Today the North Shore remains one of the most affluent and highly educated areas in the United States. Seven of its communities are in the top quintile of U.S. household income, and five of those (Lake Forest, Glencoe, Kenilworth, Winnetka, Highland Park) are in the top 5 percent. In 2021, the median household income was $127,000.

The North Shore is also the home of the Ravinia Festival, a historic outdoor music theater in Highland Park, Illinois. The Ravinia Festival, originally conceived as a weekend destination on the CNS&M line, is now a popular destination on the Metra Union Pacific North Line commuter rail, the North Shore Line's former competitor. It hosts many concerts throughout the year that, in total, attract approximately 400,000 people.

Highwood became home of the annual Pumpkin Festival which saw thousands of people every year flock to the small town for a week of music, food, community, and the lighting of 32,000 Jack o' Lanterns. The town used to hold the world record for most carved and lit Jack o' Lanterns but lost the title to Keene, New Hampshire.

The abandoned right-of-way of the North Shore Line still serves Ravinia as the Green Bay Trail, a popular rails-to-trails bicycle path that begins in Wilmette and runs north all the way to the Illinois Beach State Park in Zion.

Despite being very nearly an enclave within Highland Park, Highwood has very different demographic characteristics than its neighbors. While its median income is close to the average for the state of Illinois, it has a much lower median income than neighboring municipalities. It is more densely populated, and is the only community on the North Shore where non-Hispanic whites do not constitute a majority of the population.

== Expansion of the definition ==
It has become common for businesses in nearby inland Chicago suburbs to associate themselves with the "North Shore". Real estate agents and other marketing strategists notably use the term for Maine, New Trier, Niles, Northfield, and Norwood Townships, as well as those of southern Lake County and northern Cook County communities.

== Education ==
The Central Suburban League public high school system contains several North Shore oriented schools. The Central Suburban League is an IHSA-recognized high school extracurricular conference comprising 12 public schools located throughout the northern suburbs of Chicago. A variety of private schools are also located throughout the North Shore suburbs.

=== Higher education ===
Lake Forest College is a prominent higher education institution located within the primary bounds of the North Shore community. Other notable higher education institutions nearby include Northwestern University located in Evanston, and Oakton College located in Des Plaines, with a satellite location in Skokie.

== Films and television set or filmed on the North Shore ==
This area received much exposure in the 1980s as the setting of many teen films, particularly those of writer/director John Hughes, who grew up in Northbrook and attended Glenbrook North High School. The most notable films through the years are:

- A Wedding (1978) was filmed at a house in Lake Forest.
- Ordinary People (1980) was filmed in Highwood, Highland Park, Lake Bluff, Lake Forest, Northbrook and Wilmette.
- Class (1983) was filmed at Lake Forest College in Lake Forest and other locations in Chicago.
- Risky Business (1983) was filmed in Deerfield, Highland Park, Skokie, Winnetka and Wilmette, in addition to Lake Shore Drive.
- The Razor's Edge (1984) had portions of the film set in Lake Forest
- Sixteen Candles (1984) was filmed in Evanston, Glencoe, Highland Park, Skokie and Winnetka.
- The Breakfast Club (1985) was filmed at Maine North High School in Des Plaines. The iconic final scene of the film was filmed on Maine North's football field.
- Weird Science (1985) was filmed in Highland Park, Skokie and Northbrook.
- Ferris Bueller's Day Off (1986) was filmed in Highland Park, Winnetka, Northbrook, Lake Forest, Des Plaines, and Glencoe, in addition to many locations in Chicago itself, with scenes filmed at Glenbrook North, New Trier High School and Maine North High School.
- Planes, Trains and Automobiles (1987) was filmed in Kenilworth.
- She's Having a Baby (1988) was filmed in Winnetka, Skokie, Glencoe and Northbrook in addition to many locations in Chicago itself.
- Uncle Buck (1989) was filmed in Evanston, Glencoe, Highland Park, Lake Forest, Northbrook, Northfield, Skokie, Wilmette and Winnetka, in addition to many locations in Chicago itself.
- Home Alone (1990) was filmed in Lake Forest, Winnetka, Wilmette, Highland Park and Evanston, and featured a Maine South High School letterman's jacket.
- Home Alone 2 (1992)
- Dennis the Menace (1993) had scenes filmed in Evanston
- Chain Reaction (1996) has scenes at a Lake Bluff estate and was largely shot in downtown Chicago
- Home Alone 3 (1997) Filmed in Evanston.
- My Best Friend's Wedding (1997) has scenes at Cuneo Museum & Gardens and various Chicago locations
- Stolen Summer (2002) was set in the North Shore and filmed in Deerfield.
- Shattered Glass (2003)
- Cheaper by the Dozen (2003), as well as the beginning of its 2005 sequel
- Ocean's 12 (2004) has filmed in the Chicago area and has a few North Shore filming locations: the home of Danny and Tess Ocean is in Winnetka, in the 600 block of Walden. Dimitrios Jewelers in Lake Forest is also in one of the scenes. One of the opening scenes in which Virgil Malloy is having his rehearsal dinner where Terry Benedict shows up was filmed in Lincolnwood, Illinois.
- Surviving Christmas (2004)
- The school in Mean Girls (2004) is called North Shore High School, and references several locations throughout the area such as Walker Brother's Pancake House and Old Orchard Mall. Filming took place in Ontario.
- Derailed (2005)
- The Weather Man (2005) was filmed in Evanston and Skokie in addition to many locations in Chicago itself.
- The League (2009–2015) was set in Winnetka, with the main characters having attended the fictional North Winnetka High School.
- Source Code (2011)
- Contagion (2011) Matt Damon filmed scenes at a private home in the 500 block of Woodlawn Avenue in Glencoe.
- All Her Fault (2025) was set in Wilmette, with establishing shots showing the Bahá'í House of Worship. However, filming took place in Melbourne, Australia.

== Places of interest ==
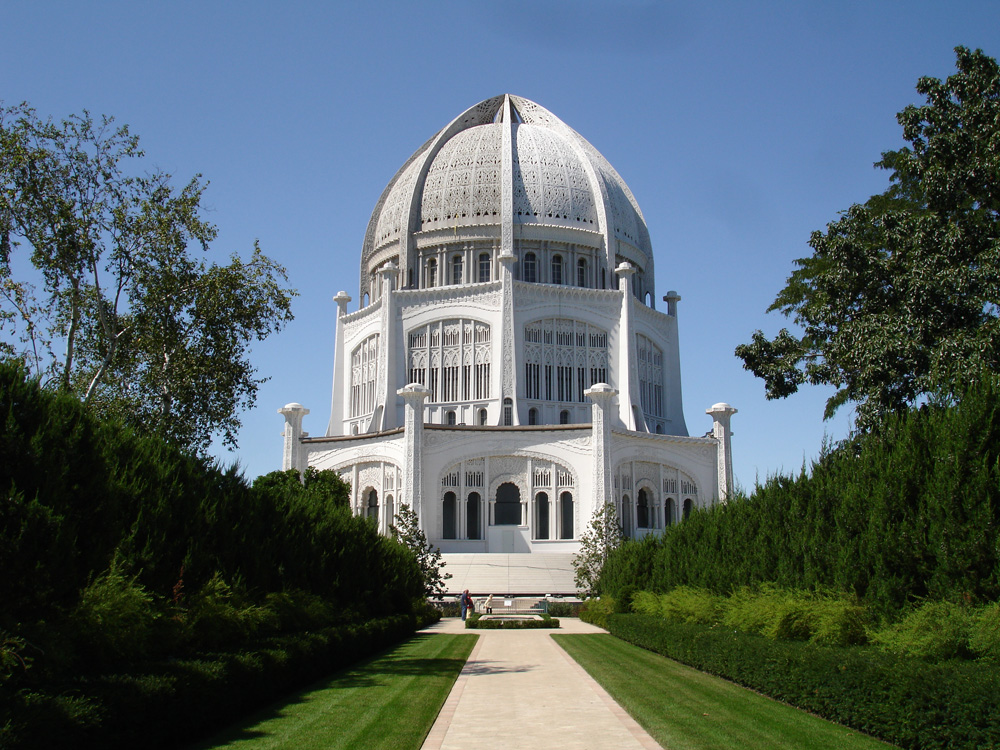
Bahá'í House of Worship, Wilmette, Illinois. The temple is the only Bahá'í House of Worship in America.

- Northwestern University, Evanston
- North Shore Center for the Performing Arts, Skokie
- Ravinia Festival, Highland Park, North America's oldest outdoor music festival.
- Chicago Botanic Garden, Glencoe
- Bahá'í Temple, Wilmette
- Illinois Holocaust Museum and Education Center, Skokie
- Kohl Children's Museum, Glenview
- Ward Willits House, Highland Park, designed by Frank Lloyd Wright in 1901
- North Point Marina, Winthrop Harbor
- Westfield Old Orchard Shopping Center, Skokie
- Illinois Beach State Park
- Grosse Point Light, Evanston
- Zion Nuclear Power Station
- Fort Sheridan, Highwood
- Lake Forest College, Lake Forest

== Bibliography ==
- Berger, Philip. Highland Park: American Suburb at Its Best: An Architectural and Historical Survey. Chicago: Chicago Review Press, 1983
- Bushnell, George D. Wilmette: A history. Wilmette: The Village of Wilmette, 1984
- Cohen, Stuart Earl and Susan S. Benjamin. North Shore Chicago: Houses of the Lakefront Suburbs, 1890-1940. New York: Acanthus Press, 2004
- Dickinson, Lora Townsend. The Story of Winnetka. Winnetka: Winnetka Historical Society, 1956
- Ebner, Michael H. Creating Chicago's North Shore. Chicago: The University of Chicago Press, 1988
- Foster, Clyde D. Evanston's Yesterdays: Stories of Early Evanston and Sketches of Some of Its Pioneers. Evanston: Privately printed, 1956
- White, Marian A. (1910). "The Book of the North Shore". J. Harrison White.
- White, Marian A. (1911). "The Second Book of the North Shore". J. Harrison White.
- Townsend, Frank with foreword by Patsy Ritter. Lake Bluff Illinois; a Pictorial History. Lake Bluff: Village of Lake Bluff Centennial Committee, 1995
- Waukegan Historical Society. Images of American - Waukegan, Illinois.Chicago: Arcadia Press, 2000
