= Beach Park, Illinois =

- Village
- Logo
- Interactive map of Beach Park, Illinois
- Coordinates: 42°25′36″N 87°51′32″W
- Country: United States
- State: Illinois
- County: Lake
- Townships: Zion, Waukegan, Newport

Area
  - Total: 7.08 sq mi (18.33 km^{2})
  - Land: 7.08 sq mi (18.33 km^{2})
  - Water: 0 sq mi (0.00 km^{2})
- Elevation: 643 ft (196 m)

Population (2020)
  - Total: 14,249
  - Density: 2,013.7/sq mi (777.49/km^{2})
- Time zone: UTC-6 (CST)
  - Summer (DST): UTC-5 (CDT)
- ZIP codes: 60099/60087/60083
- Area code(s): 847, 224
- FIPS code: 17-04303
- GNIS feature ID: 2398056
- Website: www.villageofbeachpark.com

Beach Park is a village in Benton and Waukegan townships of Lake County, Illinois, United States. Per the 2020 census, the population was 14,249.

== Geography ==
According to the 2021 census gazetteer files, Beach Park has a total area of 7.08 square miles (18.34 km^{2}), all land.

=== Major streets ===
- Green Bay Road
- Sheridan Road
- Kenosha Road
- 21st Street
- 29th Street
- 33rd Street
- Lewis Avenue
- Wadsworth Road
- Beach Road
- Yorkhouse Road
- Blanchard Road

=== Illinois Beach State Park ===
Beach Park is the home to the South Beach section of Illinois Beach State Park, which is otherwise located in Winthrop Harbor. The beach was originally part of Camp Logan, a rifle range developed by the Illinois National Guard in 1892. In World War I and World War II it served as a rifle range for the Great Lakes Naval Training Station. The range remained in operation until 1973, when it was transferred to the Illinois Department of Conservation. In 1950, the Illinois Dunes Preservation Society was established to maintain the natural qualities of the beach. With the help of the Illinois Department of Conservation the area south of Beach Road was established as the state's first natural preserve. The northern beach, between Beach Road and the Wisconsin state border, was obtained between 1971 and 1982.

The south beach is now home of the Illinois Beach Resort and Conference Center. The North Point Marina is at the north beach. This is Illinois' newest and largest marina and the largest freshwater marina in the United States.

More than 650 species of plants have been recorded in the dunes area alone, including dozens of types of colorful wildflowers.

On May 9, 2000, the area encompassing Illinois Beach State Park and North Point Marina was officially designated as the Cullerton Complex in honor of William J. Cullerton Sr., war hero, avid environmentalist and long-time friend of conservation.

== Demographics ==
Historical population
Census	Pop.	Note	%±
1990	9,513		—
2000	10,072		5.9%
2010	13,638		35.4%
2020	14,249		4.5%
U.S. Decennial Census; 2010 2020

=== Racial and ethnic composition ===
Beach Park village, Illinois – Racial and ethnic composition Note: the US Census treats Hispanic/Latino as an ethnic category. This table excludes Latinos from the racial categories and assigns them to a separate category. Hispanics/Latinos may be of any race.
Race / Ethnicity (NH = Non-Hispanic)	Pop 2000	Pop 2010	Pop 2020	% 2000	% 2010	% 2020
White alone (NH)	7,922	7,706	5,456	78.65%	56.50%	38.29%
Black or African American alone (NH)	450	1,420	1,605	4.47%	10.41%	11.26%
Native American or Alaska Native alone (NH)	20	35	23	0.20%	0.26%	0.16%
Asian alone (NH)	146	760	798	1.45%	5.57%	5.60%
Native Hawaiian or Pacific Islander alone (NH)	3	1	5	0.03%	0.01%	0.04%
Other race alone (NH)	19	33	78	0.19%	0.24%	0.55%
Mixed race or Multiracial (NH)	144	263	472	1.43%	1.93%	3.31%
Hispanic or Latino (any race)	1,368	3,420	5,812	13.58%	25.08%	40.79%
Total	10,072	13,638	14,249	100.00%	100.00%	100.00%

=== 2020 census ===
As of the 2020 census, Beach Park had a population of 14,249, with 4,964 households and 3,446 families. The population density was 2,013.71 inhabitants per square mile (777.50/km^{2}). The median age was 39.6 years. 23.4% of residents were under the age of 18 and 14.9% of residents were 65 years of age or older. For every 100 females there were 96.3 males, and for every 100 females age 18 and over there were 95.6 males age 18 and over.

100.0% of residents lived in urban areas, while 0.0% lived in rural areas.

Of all households, 34.6% had children under the age of 18 living in them. 52.0% were married-couple households, 16.2% were households with a male householder and no spouse or partner present, and 24.9% were households with a female householder and no spouse or partner present. 21.0% of all households were made up of individuals, and 9.0% had someone living alone who was 65 years of age or older. The average household size was 3.50 and the average family size was 3.03.

There were 5,179 housing units at an average density of 731.91 per square mile (282.59/km^{2}), of which 4.2% were vacant. The homeowner vacancy rate was 1.7% and the rental vacancy rate was 5.7%.

=== Income and poverty ===
The median income for a household in the village was $71,250, and the median income for a family was $72,870. Males had a median income of $46,336 versus $34,100 for females. The per capita income for the village was $28,292. About 7.2% of families and 9.5% of the population were below the poverty line, including 16.9% of those under age 18 and 4.7% of those age 65 or over.

== Education ==
Beach Park Community Consolidated School District 3 schools are Beach Park Middle School, Howe Elementary, Kenneth Murphy Elementary, Newport Elementary, and Oak Crest Elementary. Our Lady of Humility School was a Catholic school that operated from 1958-2026. High-school-age students typically attend Zion-Benton Township High School.

== Public safety ==
The village of Beach Park is policed by the Lake County Sheriff's Office. The village has contracted with the Sheriff's Office to provide additional Deputy Sheriff personnel to patrol the village during the day. These deputies are able to call on the resources of multiple deputies, and the members of the Zion, Waukegan and Gurnee police departments should an emergency require it. The village has allowed the deputies to use the Village Hall as a small sub-station, which limits the time deputies are out of the area. Previously, the deputies had to return to Waukegan or Libertyville for paperwork issues.

Beach Park is provided fire and EMS protection 24/7 by the Beach Park Fire Protection District, the Winthrop Harbor Fire Protection District and the Newport Township Fire Protection District . The Beach Park Fire Protection District provides 90% of the village with fire and EMS services. (Consolidation of the Beach Park Fire Department and Zion Fire Department are underway, changing these demographics over the 2019 census year) All three districts, have signed Auto Aid Agreements with each other which is assistance dispatched automatically by contractual agreement between two communities or fire districts.

In early 2006, the Beach Park Fire Protection District received voter support for a nominal tax increase. This increase made full-time firefighter/paramedics a reality. The department was also able to lower the Insurance Services Organization (ISO) rating to a 3. This is one of the lowest in the area and saves residents on homeowners and renter's insurance. The Beach Park Fire Department is taking positive steps by replacing older fire equipment. This will ensure that the residents receive good fire response by newer apparatus.

All departments which provide fire and emergency medical services are part of the MABAS Mutual Aid program. This program, funded by member agencies, provides assistance from the local region all the way to national resources.

== Transportation ==
Pace provides bus service on multiple routes connecting Beach Park to downtown Waukegan and other destinations.

Metra's Union Pacific/North Line runs along the eastern edge of Beach Park, but does not stop. The nearest stations are in Waukegan and Zion. The Chicago & North Western Railway had a station at Dunes Park until 1953.

== Notable person ==
- Erik Darnell, driver with NASCAR
