= Zion-Benton Township High School =

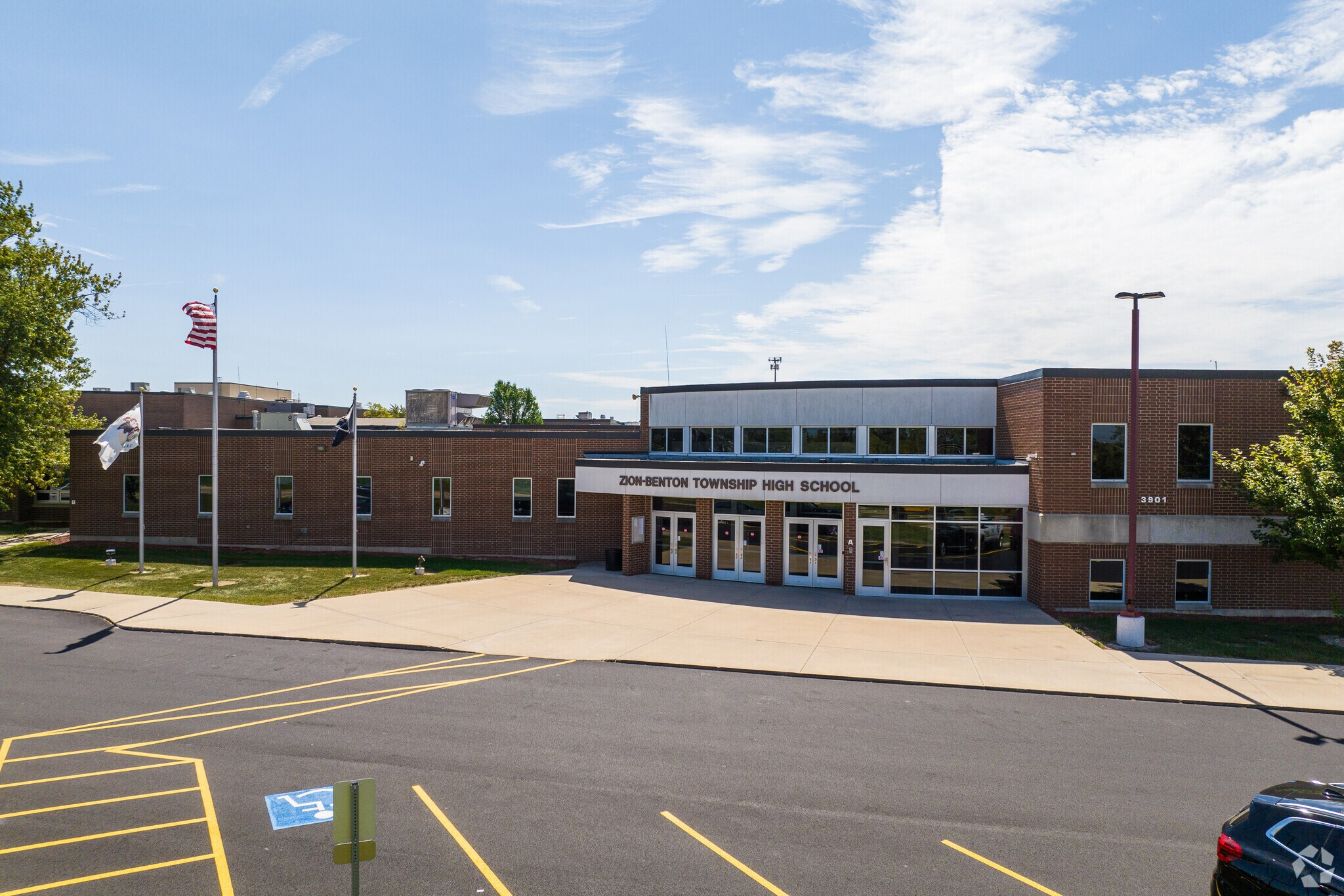

Location
- 3901 21st Street; Zion, Illinois 60099; United States; 42°27′22″N 87°52′06″W

Information
- Type: Public high school
- Motto: Respect and Responsibility
- Established: 1939
- Principal: Bonnie Felske
- Teaching staff: 140.80 (FTE)
- Grades: 9–12
- Enrollment: 2,159 (2023–2024)
- Student to teacher ratio: 15.33
- Campus: Suburban
- Colors: Maroon; White
- Nickname: Fighting Zee-Bees
- Newspaper: The Stinger
- Yearbook: Nor'Easter
- Website: www.zb126.org

Zion-Benton Township High School, or ZBTHS, is a public high school located at the corner of Kenosha Road and 21st Street in Zion, Illinois, a northern suburb of Chicago, Illinois, in the United States. It is part of Zion-Benton Township High School District 126. The school mascot/symbol is the Fighting Zee-Bee which was adapted from the Navy Seabees of World War II. In 2008 the district opened a partner school near the former ZBTHS Pearce Campus called New Tech High at Zion-Benton East, a 4-year high school associated with the New Tech Network of Napa, California. New Tech High at Zion-Benton East is located at the division of Bethesda Avenue and 23rd Street in Zion.

ZBTHS is fed by three major middle schools, including North Prairie Junior High of Winthrop Harbor, IL, Beach Park Middle School of Beach Park, IL, Zion Central Middle School and Shiloh Park Middle School of Zion, IL. ZBTHS is one of the most diverse high schools in the state of Illinois. The district is 17.99% Caucasian, 26.3% African American, 47.3% Hispanic, 2.3% Asian and Pacific Islander, .3% Native American, and 5.6% identifying as two or more races (2018–19).

== Athletics ==
Zion-Benton, along with New Tech in a combined athletic program, competes in the North Suburban Conference and Illinois High School Association. The ZB Majorettes have won 18 straight Illinois State championships, and have placed nationally several times.

== Performing Arts ==
ZBTHS shares its performing arts center with the Zion-Benton Band, Choir, and Encore Players programs. The ZB Band have been selected to perform at Illinois SuperState Concert Band Festival twice and the Encore Players have been selected for Illinois High School Theatre Fest once.

== Notable alumni ==
- Joe Daniels - musician
- Scot Lucas - musician
- Billy McKinney - NBA basketball player
- Admiral Schofield - 2nd round NBA Draft Pick
- Lenzelle Smith Jr. (born 1991) - basketball player in the Israel Basketball Premier League
