= Rob Sherman =

American politician

Personal details
- Born: April 2, 1953
- Died: December 9, 2016 (aged 63) Marengo, Illinois, U.S.
- Party: Democratic (before 2008); Green (2008–2016)
- Spouse: Celeste (m. 1978–2016)
- Children: 2
- Education: National Louis University; Northwestern University; Harper College
- Occupation: Businessman

Robert I. Sherman (April 2, 1953 – December 9, 2016) was an American political activist, perennial candidate, and businessman. He was known for his role as an Illinois Green Party candidate and for his atheist advocacy. He died in a plane crash outside Marengo, Illinois on December 9, 2016, at the age of 63.

== Biography ==
=== Early life ===
Sherman was born and raised a Jew. He stated that he was an atheist since age 9, and that "it became a big deal" when he was 13. He spent his adolescence in Highland Park, and according to a candidate questionnaire, he attended National Louis University, Northwestern University, and Harper College. He worked as an office supply dealer.

=== Atheist advocacy ===
In 1981, Sherman listened to a radio speech by Madalyn Murray O'Hair, an activist and founder of American Atheists. The speech motivated him to join the organization, and he eventually became its Illinois director and national spokesman. He first achieved notoriety on April 1, 1986, when he sued the village of Zion, Illinois for displaying a Christian cross on a water tower, as well as other property. The case eventually went to the U.S. Supreme Court in 1992, which ruled in Sherman's favor and ordered municipalities to drop the use of religious symbols. His success earned him front-page news coverage and invites to appear on national TV shows, including those of Oprah Winfrey, Phil Donahue and Larry King.

Sherman frequently received attention in the 1980s and 1990s due to his atheism activism. He filed lawsuits against numerous American municipalities, against the Boy Scouts of America in 1997, and against Township High School District 214 in 2007 for what he considered unconstitutional endorsements of religion. He was involved in numerous other lawsuits, of which at least one other went to the Supreme Court in the late 2000s. Reporter Richard Roeper said in 1998 that "he has battled towns from South Holland to Deerfield to Zion to Palatine to Highland, Ind., and Wauwatosa, Wis., over public displays of religious symbols on water towers, on government property and on official village seals." After 10 years of membership in American Atheists, he formed his own organization, Rob Sherman Advocacy.

=== Political involvement ===
In his later years, Sherman was active in politics as a perennial candidate. In 2006, he unsuccessfully ran for the 53rd district in the Illinois House of Representatives as a Democrat. In 2008, after meeting Green Party gubernatorial candidate Rich Whitney, Sherman joined the party. That same year, he ran as a Green for the same seat. He ran unsuccessfully for Buffalo Grove Village Clerk in 2011, for Illinois's 5th congressional district in 2016 as a Green – receiving 4.7% of the vote – and he had announced that he would run for Illinois's 12th congressional district in 2018. He served as the Cook County Green Party chairman in 2012.

Sherman's political positions included support for capitalism, same-sex marriage, and climate change advocacy, and he opposed red light cameras. He also supported secularist views, such as removing mentions of "God" from United States dollar and the Pledge of Allegiance and removing Christmas as a federal holiday.

=== Radio and later career ===
Sherman hosted radio shows on AM 1530 WJJG and WSSY-AM (1330).

In the summer of 2016, Sherman moved from Buffalo Grove to Poplar Grove, Illinois, where he started a company that built kit aircraft.

== Death ==
On the night of December 9, 2016, Sherman died when his Zenair CH 601 Zodiac crashed outside of Marengo, Illinois. He was 63. He was flying from his home in Poplar Grove to Schaumburg Regional Airport to attend a holiday party. The National Transportation Safety Board determined that Sherman's plane lost control soon after taking off, and that it crashed around 6:19 p.m. on December 9. Federal Aviation Administration records also showed that Sherman had a sport pilot certificate, meaning that by flying at night, he was violating the restrictions on his license.

== Personal life ==
Sherman married his wife, Celeste, in 1978, and together they had a son and a daughter. He lived in Buffalo Grove, Illinois for 32 years before moving to Poplar Grove, Illinois in the summer of 2016. He was a volunteer with the American Red Cross.

On June 4, 1998, Sherman was arrested and charged with domestic battery for beating his 16-year-old son with his hands and fists. Police also confiscated Sherman's rifle and semiautomatic handgun. The following month, Sherman was convicted of domestic battery in Cook County Court. The next year, he spent 120 days in jail for failing to follow orders to complete domestic violence counseling.
