= Richard Harper =

Richard Harper may refer to:

- Richard Harper (politician), English local politician
- Richard H. R. Harper, British computer scientist and author
- Richard H. Harper (Illinois mayor)
