= Benton Township, Lake County, Illinois =

Benton Township
- Township
- Seal

- Location in Lake County

- Lake County's location in Illinois
- Coordinates: 42°27′50″N 87°50′35″W
- Country: United States
- State: Illinois
- County: Lake
- Established: November 6, 1849

Area
  - Total: 14.52 sq mi (37.6 km^{2})
  - Land: 14.16 sq mi (36.7 km^{2})
  - Water: 0.36 sq mi (0.93 km^{2}) 2.47%
- Elevation: 666 ft (203 m)

Population (2020)
  - Total: 19,082
  - Density: 1,348/sq mi (520.3/km^{2})
- Time zone: UTC-6 (CST)
  - Summer (DST): UTC-5 (CDT)
- FIPS code: 17-097-05326
- Website: www.bentontownship.com

Benton Township is a township in Lake County, Illinois, United States, and includes all of the village of Winthrop Harbor, most of the village of Beach Park, and small portions of the cities of Zion and Waukegan. As of the 2020 census, its population was 19,082. Zion Township was formed from Benton Township on September 12, 1930.

== Geography ==
According to the 2021 census gazetteer files, Benton Township has a total area of 14.52 square miles (37.61 km^{2}), of which 14.16 square miles (36.67 km^{2}) (or 97.53%) is land and 0.36 square miles (0.93 km^{2}) (or 2.47%) is water. Lakes in this township include Sand Pond. The streams of Bull Creek and Dead River run through this township.

=== Cities and towns ===
- Beach Park
- Winthrop Harbor

=== Adjacent townships/villages ===
- Pleasant Prairie, Wisconsin (north)
- Bristol, Wisconsin (northwest)
- Zion Township (center)
- Newport Township (west)
- Waukegan Township (south)
- Warren Township (southwest)

=== Cemeteries ===
The township contains nine cemeteries: Benton Greenwood, Briggs Family, Buffalo Grove Catholic, Catholic, Colchester, County Line, Cranberry Lake, Pineview and Rosecrans.

=== Major highways ===
- Illinois Route 137

=== Airports and landing strips ===
- Waukegan Regional Airport

== Demographics ==
As of the 2020 census there were 19,082 people, 7,140 households, and 5,246 families residing in the township. The population density was 1,314.46 inhabitants per square mile (507.52/km^{2}). There were 7,432 housing units at an average density of 511.95 per square mile (197.67/km^{2}). The racial makeup of the township was 56.54% White, 9.70% African American, 1.17% Native American, 2.60% Asian, 0.04% Pacific Islander, 15.51% from other races, and 14.44% from two or more races. Hispanic or Latino of any race were 31.55% of the population.

There were 7,140 households, out of which 32.80% had children under the age of 18 living with them, 58.29% were married couples living together, 10.03% had a female householder with no spouse present, and 26.53% were non-families. 21.60% of all households were made up of individuals, and 8.90% had someone living alone who was 65 years of age or older. The average household size was 2.64 and the average family size was 3.12.

The township's age distribution consisted of 22.7% under the age of 18, 7.5% from 18 to 24, 25.2% from 25 to 44, 29.8% from 45 to 64, and 14.7% who were 65 years of age or older. The median age was 39.8 years. For every 100 females, there were 104.4 males. For every 100 females age 18 and over, there were 97.5 males.

The median income for a household in the township was $72,875, and the median income for a family was $78,452. Males had a median income of $50,355 versus $35,497 for females. The per capita income for the township was $33,965. About 4.9% of families and 6.9% of the population were below the poverty line, including 13.8% of those under age 18 and 4.1% of those age 65 or over.

Historical population
| Census | Pop. | Note | %± |
|---|---|---|---|
| 2010 | 18,951 | | — |
| 2020 | 19,082 | | 0.7% |
U.S. Decennial Census
