= Zion Township =

Zion Township may refer to the following townships in the United States:

- Zion Township, Stearns County, Minnesota
- Zion Township, Lake County, Illinois

== See also ==
- Mount Zion Township, Macon County, Illinois
