= Lenzelle Smith Jr. =

American basketball player (born 1991)

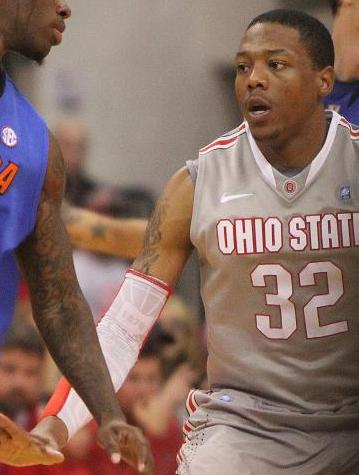

Personal information
- Born: October 3, 1991 (age 35) Zion, Illinois, U.S.
- Listed height: 6 ft 4 in (1.93 m)
- Listed weight: 209 lb (95 kg)

Career information
- High school: Zion-Benton Township (Zion, Illinois)
- College: Ohio State (2010–2014)
- NBA draft: 2014: undrafted
- Playing career: 2014–present
- Position: Shooting guard / small forward

Career history
- 2014–2015: Erie BayHawks
- 2015–2016: Basket Barcellona
- 2016: Recanati
- 2016–2017: EGIS Körmend
- 2017–2018: Kymis
- 2018–2019: Hapoel Eilat
- 2019: Iraklis Thessaloniki
- 2019–2020: Hapoel Tel Aviv
- 2020–2021: Hapoel Afula
- 2021–2022: Alba Fehérvár
- 2024–2025: Prizreni

Career highlights
- Serie A2 steals leader (2016)

Lenzelle LaJuan Smith Jr. (born October 3, 1991) is an American professional basketball player. Smith is known for being a consistent scorer in Europe. Standing at 1.94 m (6 ft 4 in), he plays the shooting guard and the small forward positions. After playing four years of college basketball at Ohio State Smith entered the 2014 NBA draft, but he was not selected in the draft's two rounds.

== High school career ==
Smith played high school basketball at Zion-Benton Township, in Zion, Illinois. As a senior, he averaged 20 points and eight rebounds, en route to being an Illinois Class 4A First Team selection and participant in the High School Academic All-American game May 1, 2010 in Azusa, Calif. The game featured the finest basketball players in the country who excelled in the classroom and contributed to their communities. The average player in the game had a grade-point average of 3.6. He also was a first-team all-state as a junior and senior and led Zion-Benton High School to a state runner-up finish in 2008 as a sophomore for head coach Don Kloth.

== College career ==
Smith played college basketball at the Ohio State University, with the Ohio State Buckeyes, from 2010 to 2014. As a freshman, Smith saw action in 20 games, including seven vs. Big Ten foes and averaged 1.2 points and 0.8 rebounds per game with nine assists and five steals. The next two seasons, his numbers improved an during his senior year, he started all 35 games, averaging 11.0 points and 5.1 rebounds per contest. Along with classmate Aaron Craft, he managed to record 100 victories in 119 career games.

== Professional career ==
=== Erie BayHawks (2014–2015) ===
Smith went undrafted in the 2014 NBA draft. On November 1, 2014, Smith was selected with the 38th pick by the Erie BayHawks in the 2014 NBA Development League Draft. In 47 games played for the BayHawks, Smith averaged 7.3 points, 3.4 rebounds and 2.2 assists per game.

=== Barcellona / Recanati (2015–2016) ===
On July 1, 2015, Smith joined the Orlando Magic for the 2015 NBA Summer League.

On September 10, 2015, Smith signed a one-year deal with the Italian team Basket Barcellona of Serie A2. However, on March 16, 2016, Smith parted ways with Barcellona to join Recanati for the rest of the season. In 23 games played during the 2015–16 season, Smith led the Serie A2 in steals (1.4 per game) and also averaged 16.4 points, 6.3 rebounds and 2.5 assists per game.

=== Körmend (2016–2017) ===
On August 12, 2016, Smith signed a one-year deal with the Hungarian team EGIS Körmend. On March 26, 2016, Smith recorded a career-high 27 points, shooting 8-of-9 from the field, along with two rebounds, four assists and three steals in a 103–82 win over Szolnoki Olaj. Smith helped Körmend to reach the 2017 Hungarian League Semifinals, as well as the 2017 FIBA Europe Cup Round of 16, where they eventually lost to Élan Chalon. In 53 game played during the 2016–17 season, Smith averaged 14.3 points, 6.5 rebounds, 3.4 assists and 1.4 steals per game.

=== Kymis (2017–2018) ===
On August 27, 2017, Smith signed with the Greek team Kymis for the 2017–18 season. Smith helped Kymis to reach the 2018 Greek League Playoffs, where they eventually lost to Olympiacos. In 27 games played during the 2017–18 season, Smith averaged 12 points, 6.1 rebounds, 2.5 assists and 1.2 steals per game.

=== Hapoel Eilat (2018–2019) ===
On July 24, 2018, Smith signed a one-year deal with the Israeli team Hapoel Eilat. On October 20, 2018, Smith recorded a season-high 26 points, shooting 9-for-15 from the field, along with five rebounds, eight assists and two steals in a 102–108 overtime loss to Hapoel Holon. In 15 games played for Eilat, Smith averaged 12.3 points, 4.6 rebounds, 5.6 assists and 1.6 steals per game. On February 21, 2019, Smith parted ways with Eilat due to a wrist injury.

=== Iraklis (2019) ===
On August 13, 2019, Smith returned to Greece for a second stint, signing with Iraklis for the 2019–20 season. In 4 games played for Iraklis, he averaged 8 points and 4.5 rebounds per game.

=== Hapoel Tel Aviv (2019–2020) ===
On November 2, 2019, Smith parted ways with Iraklis to join Hapoel Tel Aviv for the rest of the season. Three days later, he recorded 25 points in his debut, while shooting 6-of-11 from three-point range, along with five rebounds and seven assists in an 85–68 win over Hapoel Gilboa Galil.

=== Hapoel Afula (2020–2021) ===
Smith joined Hapoel Afula in 2020 and averaged 16.8 points, 7.6 rebounds, and 4.4 assists per game. He left the team in January 2021.

=== Alba Fehérvár (2021–present) ===
On December 9, 2021, Smith signed with Alba Fehérvár of the Hungary Nemzeti Bajnokság I/A (NB I/A).
