= Zion-Benton Township High School District 126 =

School district in Illinois, United States

Address
- 3901 West 21st Street Zion, Illinois, 60099; United States

District information
- Grades: 9-12
- Superintendent: Dr. Jesse Rodriguez

Other information
- Website: www.zb126.org

Zion-Benton Township High School District 126 is a high school district in northeastern Lake County, Illinois. It has two high schools, both in Zion: Zion-Benton Township High School at 3901 West 21st Street, and New Tech High at Zion-Benton East at 1634 23rd Street. As of 2021, the district's superintendent is Dr. Jesse Rodriguez.
