= Seal of Zion, Illinois =

City seal

Seal of Zion

Versions
- The seal between 1902 and 1992
- Armiger: City of Zion, Illinois
- Adopted: 1992
- Use: City seal

The seal of Zion, Illinois, is the official city seal for Zion, Illinois, United States. It was adopted in 1992 following a Court of Appeal ruling that the previous seal which had been used since 1902 was unconstitutional due to its Christian symbolism. The seal is based around the dome on the city's bandstand and uses the American national motto "In God We Trust" to replace "God reigns" in the old seal, which was the reason why the United States courts of appeals ruled it unlawful for use.

== Original seal ==
Scottish Christian evangelist John Alexander Dowie, founder of the Christian Catholic Church in Zion, founded the city in 1902. The mayor and council created and adopted the seal in the same year. The seal used a quartered shield with a cross, a dove holding an olive branch, a crown with a scepter with the city name in the shield and the phrase "God reigns" in a banner above the Christian symbols. The seal appeared in the city's council chambers and on city vehicles. Patches on the city's police and fire departments also included the seal. The flag of Zion incorporated the seal on a white background in a portion of the flag.

=== Lawsuit ===
In 1986, atheist Rob Sherman drove by Zion and saw the seal on the city's water tower. The seal's Christian elements offended Sherman and he demanded the city change the seal. The City of Zion refused this demand despite Sherman's threats of legal action. As Sherman lacked standing to bring a lawsuit against Zion, he unsuccessfully appealed on national radio for a Zion resident to support him. He then met Clint Harris at an American Atheists meeting in 1987, and paid for Harris to rent a room in Zion to enable him as the plaintiff in the lawsuit that he filed against the city.

In 1990, the United States District Court for the Northern District of Illinois heard the case. The court found that the seal violated the First Amendment to the United States Constitution's principle of separation of church and state and failed the Lemon test due to its Christian symbols. The court ruled it illegal for Zion to continue its use. The finding of unconstitutionality was due to Dowie's statement that the three symbols were Christian references at the time of the seal's creation. The court also found that the "God reigns" banner was also a religious statement that had no secular context.

The city appealed the District Court decision to the United States Court of Appeals for the Seventh Circuit. A local nonprofit citizen's group called "Save Our Seal" raised $30,000 to help the city with its legal costs. The appeal was initially decided by a panel of three federal judges in a 2–1 judgement to uphold the District Court's decision that the seal's symbols served no secular purpose and was thus illegal for the city to use. The city then petitioned the full court for a rehearing. All 11 Appeal Court judges reheard the case and voted 6–5 against Zion's petition. Zion subsequently appealed the case to the Supreme Court of the United States. However, the Supreme Court Justices refused to grant certiorari to hear the case, as only three out of the required four Justices endorsed the hearing of the case. Thus the seal remained unlawful for the city to use. The city then had sixty days to comply with court orders to remove the old seal from public view.

== New seal ==
Following Zion's unsuccessful attempt to bring the case to the Supreme Court, the City Council started a competition for a new seal. The contest was won by a 10th grade Winthrop Harbor schoolgirl, who was awarded a plaque and a Christmas ornament of the old seal. The winning seal design was based around the dome of the demolished Zion Hotel which had become the bandstand in the city and the flag of the United States with the American national motto "In God We Trust" added to it in place of "God reigns". Sherman again sued with the additional hope of getting "In God We Trust" removed from American coinage, but this time was unsuccessful due to a federal judge ruling that the motto was constitutional as was the new seal of Zion.

Starting in 1993, the city began removing the old seal from public view as the court judgement required. The Zion police department initially covered up the old seal with a white sticker on their patrol vehicles. They then temporarily painted gold stars and the name of Zion over the sticker, as some felt the blank sticker ruined the look of the police cars. By 1994, the police had incorporated the new city seal into their decals.

In 2011, the Lake County News-Sun newspaper published a community forum notice by a city commissioner who used the old seal. Sherman sued the city for contempt of court and demanded the commissioner resign. They eventually settled the case out of court.
