= New Tech High at Zion-Benton East =

Zion-Benton East

Location
- 1634 23rd Street; Zion, Illinois 60099; United States
- 42.4561°N 87.8682°W

Information
- School type: public, secondary, alternative
- Opened: 2008
- School district: Zion-Benton Twp. HS 126
- Superintendent: Jesse J. Rodriguez
- Principal: Kevin Wiland
- Grades: 9-12
- Enrollment: 339 (2014-15)
- Campus type: suburban
- Website: zbeast.zb126.org

Zion-Benton East, or New Tech, is a public high school in Zion, Illinois, a suburb of Chicago. It is in Zion-Benton Township High School District 126.
