= Zion Township, Illinois =

Zion Township
- Township
- Location in Lake County

- Lake County's location in Illinois
- Coordinates: 42°27′24″N 87°50′35″W
- Country: United States
- State: Illinois
- County: Lake
- Established: September 12, 1930

Area
  - Total: 9.93 sq mi (25.7 km^{2})
  - Land: 9.93 sq mi (25.7 km^{2})
  - Water: 0.00 sq mi (0 km^{2}) 0.01%
- Elevation: 669 ft (204 m)

Population (2020)
  - Total: 24,655
  - Density: 2,480/sq mi (959/km^{2})
- Time zone: UTC-6 (CST)
  - Summer (DST): UTC-5 (CDT)
- FIPS code: 17-097-84233
- Website: www.ziontownship.org

Zion Township is a township in Lake County, in the U.S. state of Illinois. Its boundaries correspond exactly to those of the city of Zion. As of the 2020 census, its population was 24,655. It was formed from Benton Township on September 12, 1930.

== Geography ==
According to the 2021 census gazetteer files, Zion Township has a total area of 9.93 square miles (25.72 km^{2}), of which 9.93 square miles (25.72 km^{2}) (or 99.99%) is land and 0.00 square miles (0.00 km^{2}) (or 0.01%) is water. The stream of Kellogg Creek runs through this township. Camp Logan was located in this township.

=== Adjacent townships ===
- Benton Township
- Newport Township (west)

=== Cemeteries ===
The township contains two cemeteries: Lake Mound and Mt. Olivet Memorial Park.

=== Major highways ===
- Illinois Route 131
- Illinois Route 137
- Illinois Route 173

== Demographics ==
As of the 2020 census there were 24,655 people, 8,185 households, and 5,394 families residing in the township. The population density was 2,482.38 inhabitants per square mile (958.45/km^{2}). There were 9,295 housing units at an average density of 935.86 per square mile (361.34/km^{2}). The racial makeup of the township was 28.72% White, 31.17% African American, 1.93% Native American, 2.23% Asian, 0.09% Pacific Islander, 21.48% from other races, and 14.38% from two or more races. Hispanic or Latino of any race were 38.46% of the population.

There were 8,185 households, out of which 37.90% had children under the age of 18 living with them, 41.31% were married couples living together, 16.38% had a female householder with no spouse present, and 34.10% were non-families. 30.70% of all households were made up of individuals, and 9.70% had someone living alone who was 65 years of age or older. The average household size was 2.84 and the average family size was 3.57.

The township's age distribution consisted of 27.0% under the age of 18, 12.2% from 18 to 24, 25% from 25 to 44, 24.5% from 45 to 64, and 11.4% who were 65 years of age or older. The median age was 33.0 years. For every 100 females, there were 88.0 males. For every 100 females age 18 and over, there were 88.0 males.

The median income for a household in the township was $56,819, and the median income for a family was $66,803. Males had a median income of $37,319 versus $29,416 for females. The per capita income for the township was $23,345. About 12.5% of families and 14.3% of the population were below the poverty line, including 18.3% of those under age 18 and 9.5% of those age 65 or over.

Historical population
Census	Pop.	Note	%±
2010	24,413		—
2020	24,655		1.0%
U.S. Decennial Census
