= Jorge Avila-Torrez =

American serial killer (born 1988)

- Born: August 18, 1988 (age 38); Zion, Illinois, U.S.
- Status: Incarcerated
- Convictions: Federal; First degree murder Virginia; Abduction with the intent to defile (3 counts); Forcible sodomy (3 counts); Robbery (2 counts); Rape; Use of a firearm in the commission of a felony (4 counts); Illinois; First degree murder (2 counts)
- Penalty: Federal; Death; commuted to life imprisonment without parole Virginia; 5 life sentences plus 168 years Illinois; 100 years imprisonment

Details
- Victims: 5 (3 murders, 2 assaults)
- Span of crimes: 2005–2009
- Country: United States
- States: Illinois, Virginia
- Date apprehended: February 2010

Jorge Avila-Torrez (born August 18, 1988) is an American serial killer and rapist. A resident of Zion, Illinois, Avila-Torrez murdered two girls who lived in his neighborhood in 2005 and later murdered a female petty officer in 2009 at Joint Base Myer–Henderson Hall. He was sentenced to death by the federal government for that crime as well as receiving a 100-year sentence for the Illinois murders. On December 23, 2024, Avila-Torrez's death sentence was commuted to life without parole by President Joe Biden.

== Early life ==
Jorge Avila-Torrez was born on August 18, 1988, in Zion, Illinois. His parents had emigrated to the United States from Mexico. His father worked in a cardboard factory, while his mother was employed as a homemaker; Avila-Torrez was reportedly close to his older sister, Sara. According to acquaintances, during high school Torrez frequently engaged in truancy, and in 2005 was expelled after police found him in possession of a small amount of marijuana on school grounds.

== Murders ==
Eight-year-old Laura Hobbs and nine-year-old Krystal Tobias went out to play on their bicycles but failed to return by nightfall on Mother's Day, May 8, 2005. Their families, police, and volunteers searched for the girls all night, but to no avail. The girls bodies were found the following day by Hobbs's father, Jerry. Both girls had suffered fatal stab wounds to their necks and faces. In addition, they were sexually assaulted.

Authorities immediately focused on Jerry Hobbs, as he was an ex-convict. Hobbs had moved to the city in the summer of 2005 from Texas to reconcile with his girlfriend and three children following an incident where he chased off a man with a chainsaw. Police arrested him for possession of a knife, and after a lengthy interrogation, he confessed to the murders.

Hobbs spent the following five years in a Lake County jail awaiting trial, despite his defense team and a private laboratory finding that semen samples taken from Laura's body did not match Jerry in 2008.

=== Virginia crimes ===
Not long after the double murder, Avila-Torrez joined the Marines. He was stationed at Joint Base Myer–Henderson Hall in Arlington County, Virginia. In 2009, he attacked 20-year-old Navy Petty Officer 2nd Class Amanda Jean Snell, a Naval Military Intelligence specialist, strangling her to death in the barracks area. He escaped detection for the murder until he was apprehended for later crimes.

In February 2010, Avila-Torrez stalked and abducted two women in Northern Virginia, binding them with electrical cords in their Ballston apartment. He kidnapped one of the women, driving to a secluded area where he raped and strangled her before leaving her for dead at the side of the road. The woman survived and reported the crime, leading to the arrest of Avila-Torrez. DNA collected and run from this case was linked to the previous murders.

== Trials and imprisonment ==
After his arrest, Avila-Torrez was housed with 37-year-old Osama El-Atari, a former restaurateur jailed for defrauding several banks of $53 million. In exchange for a lesser sentence, El-Atari had agreed to carry a wiretap on him, and during one of their recorded conversations, he asked Jorge if he feels any remorse. In response, Avila-Torrez replied negatively and directly implicated himself in all three murders. In October 2010, Torrez was found guilty of rape and kidnapping charges. On December 10, 2010, Torrez was sentenced to five life sentences without parole plus 168 years by Arlington County Judge Benjamin Kendrick.

In 2011, Torrez was charged by federal authorities in the death of Amanda Snell. In 2013, Jerry Hobbs received 6 million dollars from Lake County after being wrongfully accused of killing his own daughter. On April 24, 2014, a federal jury, backed by the jailhouse confession, El-Atari's testimony, and the DNA evidence, sentenced Avila-Torrez to death for the Snell murder, making him the first person since 2007 to receive such a verdict. A month later, a federal judge officially affirmed the jury's decision. Avila-Torrez was put on trial for the murder of the two girls that same year. His defense attorney, Jed Stone, attempted to dismiss the DNA evidence as "substandard and weak", additionally pointing out that El-Atari's testimony should be discarded, as he was found murdered during an unrelated robbery in Maryland that February.

On September 18, 2018, Avila-Torrez pled guilty in exchange for 100 years imprisonment and a transfer from Red Onion State Prison, which Stone called "an evil, racist facility." At his sentencing, presiding Justice Daniel Shanes told Avila-Torrez that he was a serial killer, and if he had even a spark of goodness, it was so far out of his reach that it was unattainable.

On December 23, 2024, Avila-Torrez's federal death sentence was commuted to life without parole after outgoing President Joe Biden granted sentence commutations to 37 of the 40 inmates on federal death row.

== See also ==
- List of serial killers in the United States
