= Henry I. Paddock House =

Historic house in Illinois, United States

- U.S. National Register of Historic Places
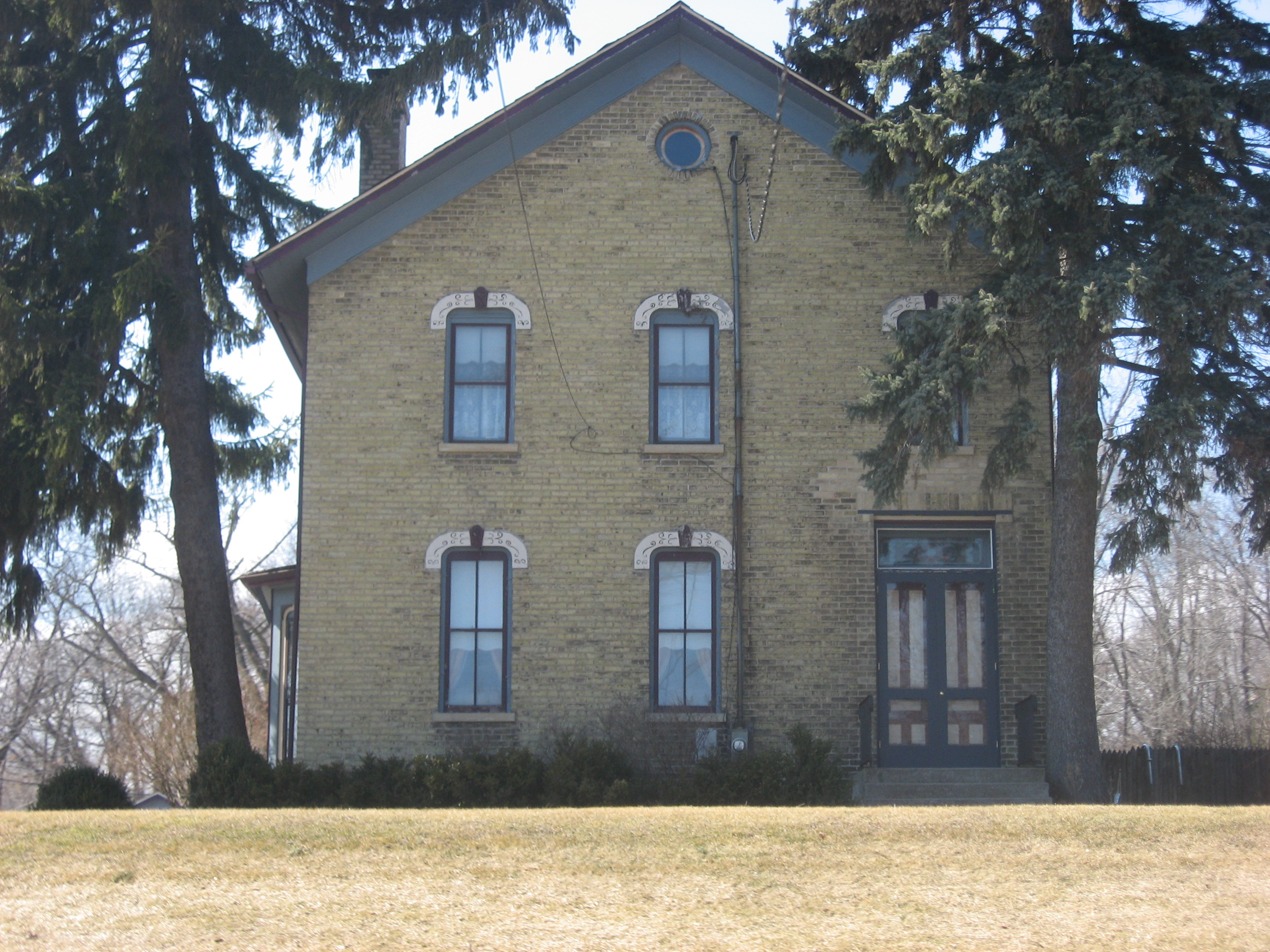

- Location within Illinois Location within the United States
- Location: 346 Sheridan Rd., Winthrop Harbor, Illinois
- Coordinates: 42°29′16″N 87°49′21″W
- Area: 0.7 acres (0.28 ha)
- Built: 1860
- Architectural style: Italianate, Queen Anne
- NRHP reference No.: 01000596
- Added to NRHP: May 30, 2001

The Henry I. Paddock House is a historic house at 346 Sheridan Road in Winthrop Harbor, Illinois. Built in 1860 by Henry I. Paddock, the house is the oldest in Winthrop Harbor. The house was designed in the Italianate style, a popular choice in the 1850s and 1860s. Its design includes a front-facing gable and tall, thin windows topped with arches, both typical Italianate elements; it originally included two Italianate porches as well. The house was remodeled in 1884 to add Queen Anne elements, including a bay window with wood detailing and stained glass transoms above the doors.

The house was added to the National Register of Historic Places on May 30, 2001.
