= Winthrop Harbor School District 1 =

School district in Illinois, United States

Address
- 500 North Ave Winthrop Harbor, Illinois, 60096; United States

District information
- Grades: K-8
- Superintendent: Jeff McCartney

Other information
- Website: Official website

Winthrop Harbor School District 1 is an elementary school district based in Winthrop Harbor, a village in Lake County, the northernmost settlement in the state of Illinois. It is composed of two schools, Westfield School and North Prairie Junior High School. Students between grades Kindergarten and fourth grade are educated at Westfield School, under the direction of principal Summer Poepping. District students then enter North Prairie Junior High School, which serves grades fifth through eight. The principal of North Prairie is Carrie Nottingham. Winthrop Harbor School District's superintendent is Jeff McCartney.
