= List of highest-income ZIP Code Tabulation Areas in the United States =

The following is a list of the highest-income ZCTAs in the United States. ZCTAs or ZIP Code Tabulation Areas are the census equivalent of ZIP codes used for statistical purposes. The reason why regular ZIP codes are not used is because they are defined by routes rather than geographic boundaries. Thus, they have the tendency to overlap and otherwise create difficulties. ZIP Code Tabulations are not exact; they are only near approximations.

== ZCTAs with Median Household Income of $250,000 or More ==
The following data has been updated per the 2024 Census Data. ZCTAs with populations under 1,000 were excluded from the list. In Census table B19013, entries shown as $250,000+ are upper-coded and should be treated as tied rather than individually ranked.

ZCTA	Population
01741	5,239
01770	4,427
02030	5,930
02468	5,773
02481	17,415
02493	11,579
03750	1,116
06820	21,936
06840	20,870
06853	3,171
06870	7,864
06878	8,328
06880	27,583
06883	10,396
07021	2,361
07043	13,256
07046	4,585
07078	14,613
07423	4,270
07704	6,170
07945	9,690
08738	1,381
10004	3,711
10007	7,406
10282	5,887
10502	6,197
10504	7,665
10506	6,244
10514	11,790
10526	2,128
10536	10,669
10576	4,891
10577	5,945
10578	1,780
10580	18,391
10583	40,207
10804	16,108
11568	4,144
11724	3,073
19035	3,937
19066	5,839
19085	11,230
20015	15,653
20759	6,624
20854	50,498
21737	2,474
21738	3,696
22027	1,939
22039	19,626
22066	17,185
22101	30,953
22904	5,729
33109	1,083
55424	10,289
60022	8,352
60043	2,503
60093	19,867
76092	31,520
94020	1,694
94022	20,027
94024	23,051
94027	7,002
94028	6,531
94506	27,055
94507	14,586
94563	19,378
94957	2,321
95030	13,151
95070	31,417
95120	36,967
98039	2,928
98075	25,498

== ZCTAs Ranked by Per Capita Income ==
The data shown is based on the 2024 United States Census American Community Survey. Zip codes with populations under 1,000 were excluded from this list due to large effect size.

2024 Top 100 Highest Per Capita Income Zip Codes in the United States
Rank	ZCTA	Population	Per Capita Income (USD)
1	33109	1,083	302,761
2	11005	2,174	218,922
3	10007	7,406	212,686
4	10282	5,887	205,317
5	94105	13,861	197,122
6	33480	10,924	196,153
7	28207	9,527	189,319
8	94027	7,002	188,761
9	60606	3,840	178,211
10	43432	1,357	177,956
11	10014	29,230	175,458
12	94957	2,321	175,428
13	94028	6,531	175,395
14	10013	27,219	174,304
15	10280	8,933	172,563
16	98039	2,928	171,315
17	94123	24,054	170,097
18	06853	3,171	168,472
19	02110	2,342	167,345
20	07078	14,613	166,888
21	10028	49,077	165,387
22	10069	6,509	165,146
23	19035	3,937	164,972
24	02210	6,971	164,154
25	20004	1,831	164,057
26	10022	34,049	162,996
27	20818	1,539	159,058
28	63124	10,839	158,119
29	10005	9,439	157,447
30	10075	21,897	157,038
31	94920	12,609	156,030
32	34228	7,539	155,139
33	08738	1,381	153,702
34	53058	3,405	153,495
35	95030	13,151	153,418
36	03780	1,071	153,359
37	94022	20,027	152,520
38	06820	21,936	152,454
39	10580	18,391	152,358
40	78701	11,824	151,121
41	10021	39,868	150,790
42	60043	2,503	150,130
43	99519	1,297	149,951
44	94024	23,051	149,845
45	02199	1,292	149,001
46	07311	1,714	148,790
47	66211	5,791	148,754
48	92210	4,871	148,564
49	06878	8,328	147,326
50	60022	8,352	147,290
51	10538	17,760	147,287
52	90210	19,004	147,098
53	10024	63,115	147,036
54	10583	40,207	146,652
55	94114	33,020	146,284
56	10004	3,711	146,049
57	10576	4,891	145,941
58	90067	3,875	145,714
59	30327	23,673	145,112
60	02108	3,794	144,957
61	10065	30,808	144,510
62	06870	7,864	144,459
63	60093	19,867	143,783
64	06840	20,870	143,695
65	90077	8,386	143,204
66	06890	4,653	143,002
67	94301	17,508	142,773
68	85253	17,904	142,712
69	06831	15,210	142,594
70	07423	4,270	142,575
71	90402	11,337	142,508
72	75225	22,237	142,203
73	10011	48,277	141,874
74	94507	14,586	141,743
75	10506	6,244	141,676
76	90272	21,390	141,322
77	94563	19,378	140,701
78	07934	1,293	139,507
79	94062	25,759	139,495
80	20015	15,653	138,482
81	11976	2,952	138,280
82	10023	69,455	137,528
83	06830	24,880	137,502
84	10010	30,702	137,086
85	02493	11,579	136,646
86	55356	5,696	136,506
87	30363	3,523	136,466
88	22101	30,953	135,969
89	34102	11,179	135,805
90	02468	5,773	135,724
91	92661	3,079	135,686
92	01773	4,891	134,930
93	07620	1,588	134,889
94	10514	11,790	134,413
95	06880	27,583	134,241
96	02030	5,930	133,756
97	93108	11,526	133,318
98	20815	30,505	133,313
99	98112	23,921	133,171
100	04110	1,657	133,146
