= Richard H. Harper (Illinois mayor) =

American politician

Mayor of Zion, Illinois
- In office 1902–1906
- Preceded by: Inaugural

Richard H. Harper was a Canadian-born American builder, contractor, educator, and civic leader who served as the first mayor of Zion, Illinois.

He was a prominent early member of the Christian Catholic Church (later known as the Christian Catholic Apostolic Church) founded by John Alexander Dowie and played a major role in the construction and development of Zion.

== Early life and education ==
Harper was born near the town of Whitby, Ontario, Canada. He graduated from Victoria University and subsequently taught for several years after which he moved to Picton, Ontario where he engaged building and manufacturing. He moved to Colorado and then Chicago where he obtained U.S. citizenship.

== Career ==
Harper was raised a Methodist. in 1895, he attended meetings conducted by John Alexander Dowie in Chicago. After the Christian Catholic Apostolic Church was organized on February 22, 1896, he became a charter member and was the first deacon ordained in the church. He was appointed superintendent of buildings for the church in Chicago where he oversaw numerous alterations to Zion Home and various tabernacles. He also taught mathematics and physics at Zion College.

After the founding of Zion City, Harper was responsible for the construction of all the major buildings in the new community including the Lace Factory, the Power House, Hospices, the Administration Building, Shiloh Tabernacle, and Shiloh House. Harper served four years as the first mayor of Zion.

== Personal life ==
In 1875, he married his first wife (née Martin) of Belleville, Ontario who died while he was in Colorado. In June 1894, he married Mary Whiteside.
