= Winthrop Harbor, Illinois =

- Village
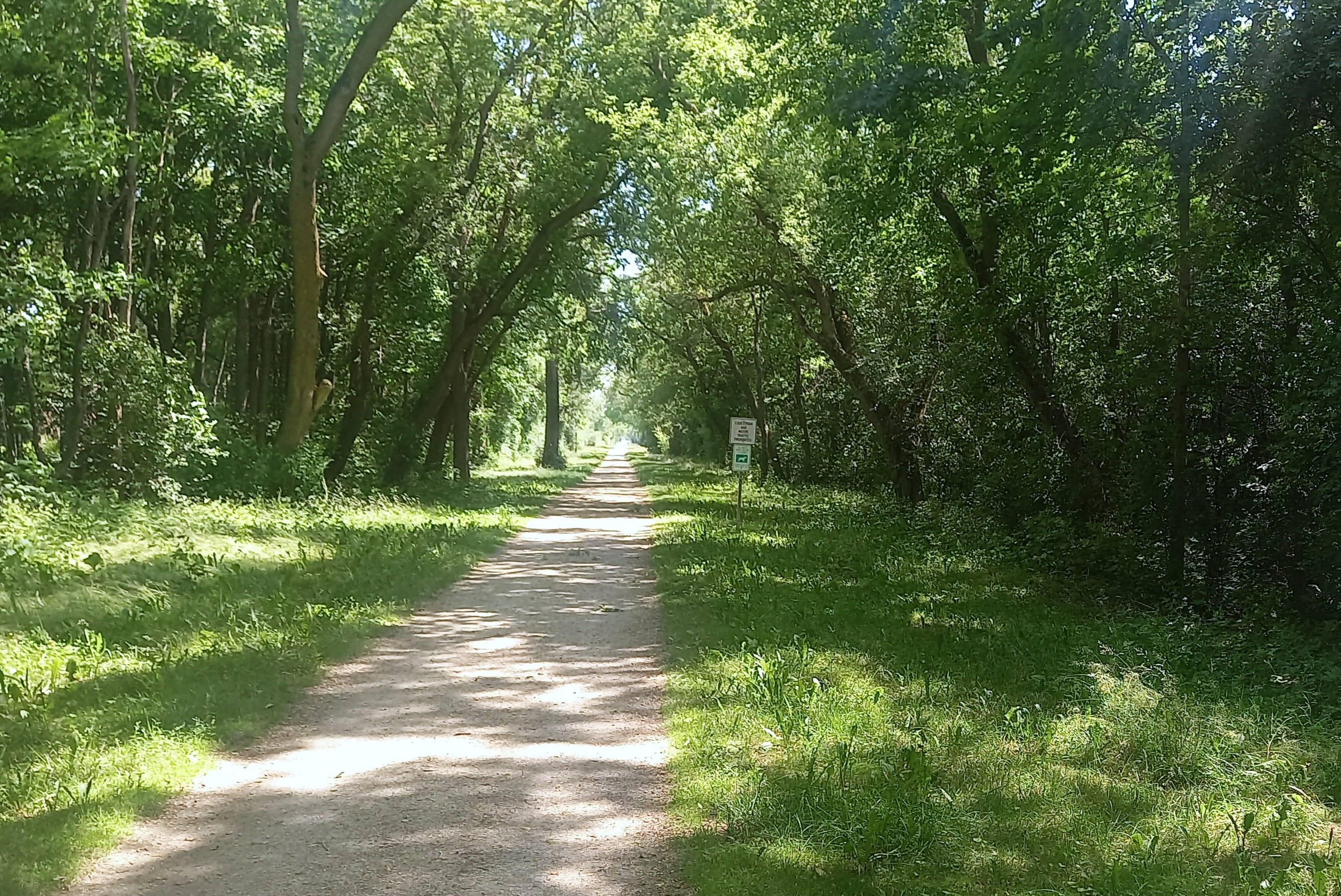
- Robert McClory Bike Path in Winthrop Harbor

- Seal
- Motto: Cornerstone of Illinois
- Location of Winthrop Harbor in Lake County, Illinois.
- Coordinates: 42°28′50″N 87°49′45″W
- Country: United States
- State: Illinois
- County: Lake
- Township: Benton

Area
  - Total: 4.80 sq mi (12.43 km^{2})
  - Land: 4.64 sq mi (12.01 km^{2})
  - Water: 0.16 sq mi (0.42 km^{2})
- Elevation: 656 ft (200 m)

Population (2020)
  - Total: 6,705
  - Density: 1,446.1/sq mi (558.36/km^{2})
- Time zone: UTC-6 (CST)
  - Summer (DST): UTC-5 (CDT)
- ZIP code: 60096
- Area code: 847/224
- FIPS code: 17-82686
- GNIS feature ID: 2399725
- Website: www.winthropharbor.com

Winthrop Harbor is a village in Lake County, Illinois, United States. Winthrop Harbor is considered the corner stone of Illinois. Per the 2020 census, the population was 6,705. It is located along the northern border of Illinois and is part of the Chicago metropolitan area. Winthrop Harbor is known for its North Point Marina, and is a warning demarcation point for the National Weather Service's marine warnings for Lake Michigan.

== History ==
In 1860 the Henry I. Paddock House was completed. It is the oldest surviving structure in the village. In 1871 a post office was built on what would become IL 137 named Spring Bluff. Not only did this spur an increase in population in the area, but it would inspire the name of the Spring Bluff Forest Preserve. Of which the state began purchasing land for in 1963.

J. H. Van Vlissingen originally intended on developing the area in 1883, however nothing came of it. In 1899 the Winthrop Harbor and Dock Company purchased over 2,000 acres just south of the state line of Wisconsin. Winthrop Harbor was incorporated as a village in 1901.

Despite the intention of the settlement to be an industrial district, the village remained mainly residential until 1989 when the North Point Marina was constructed. Until the modern day the marina is considered the pride and soul of village.

== Geography ==
According to the 2021 census gazetteer files, Winthrop Harbor has a total area of 4.80 square miles (12.43 km^{2}), of which 4.64 square miles (12.02 km^{2}) (or 96.58%) is land and 0.16 square miles (0.41 km^{2}) (or 3.42%) is water.

== Demographics ==
Historical population
| Census | Pop. | Note | %± |
|---|---|---|---|
| 1910 | 439 | | — |
| 1920 | 473 | | 7.7% |
| 1930 | 661 | | 39.7% |
| 1940 | 785 | | 18.8% |
| 1950 | 1,765 | | 124.8% |
| 1960 | 3,848 | | 118.0% |
| 1970 | 4,794 | | 24.6% |
| 1980 | 5,427 | | 13.2% |
| 1990 | 6,240 | | 15.0% |
| 2000 | 6,670 | | 6.9% |
| 2010 | 6,742 | | 1.1% |
| 2020 | 6,705 | | −0.5% |
U.S. Decennial Census; 2010 2020

=== Racial and ethnic composition ===
Winthrop Harbor village, Illinois – Racial and ethnic composition Note: the US Census treats Hispanic/Latino as an ethnic category. This table excludes Latinos from the racial categories and assigns them to a separate category. Hispanics/Latinos may be of any race.
| Race / Ethnicity (NH = Non-Hispanic) | Pop 2000 | Pop 2010 | Pop 2020 | % 2000 | % 2010 | % 2020 |
|---|---|---|---|---|---|---|
| White alone (NH) | 6,088 | 5,813 | 4,824 | 91.27% | 86.22% | 71.95% |
| Black or African American alone (NH) | 37 | 96 | 349 | 0.55% | 1.42% | 5.21% |
| Native American or Alaska Native alone (NH) | 25 | 21 | 19 | 0.37% | 0.31% | 0.28% |
| Asian alone (NH) | 124 | 150 | 155 | 1.86% | 2.22% | 2.31% |
| Native Hawaiian or Pacific Islander alone (NH) | 1 | 1 | 2 | 0.01% | 0.01% | 0.03% |
| Other race alone (NH) | 16 | 5 | 43 | 0.24% | 0.07% | 0.64% |
| Mixed race or Multiracial (NH) | 76 | 141 | 340 | 1.14% | 2.09% | 5.07% |
| Hispanic or Latino (any race) | 303 | 515 | 973 | 4.54% | 7.64% | 14.51% |
| Total | 6,670 | 6,742 | 6,705 | 100.00% | 100.00% | 100.00% |

=== 2020 census ===
As of the 2020 census, Winthrop Harbor had a population of 6,705, with 2,638 households and 2,014 families residing in the village. The population density was 1,396.88 inhabitants per square mile (539.34/km^{2}), and there were 2,749 housing units at an average density of 572.71 per square mile (221.12/km^{2}).

The median age was 44.6 years. 19.5% of residents were under the age of 18 and 19.2% were 65 years of age or older. For every 100 females, there were 96.7 males, and for every 100 females age 18 and over, there were 95.7 males age 18 and over.

99.9% of residents lived in urban areas, while 0.1% lived in rural areas.

Of all households, 26.9% had children under the age of 18 living in them. 54.5% were married-couple households, 16.1% were households with a male householder and no spouse or partner present, and 23.2% were households with a female householder and no spouse or partner present. About 23.8% of all households were made up of individuals, and 10.5% had someone living alone who was 65 years of age or older.

Of all housing units, 4.0% were vacant. The homeowner vacancy rate was 1.3% and the rental vacancy rate was 5.2%.

=== Income and poverty ===
The median income for a household in the village was $82,500, and the median income for a family was $98,990. Males had a median income of $57,650 versus $42,417 for females. The per capita income for the village was $39,723. About 1.6% of families and 2.2% of the population were below the poverty line, including 0.0% of those under age 18 and 3.1% of those age 65 or over.

== Transportation ==
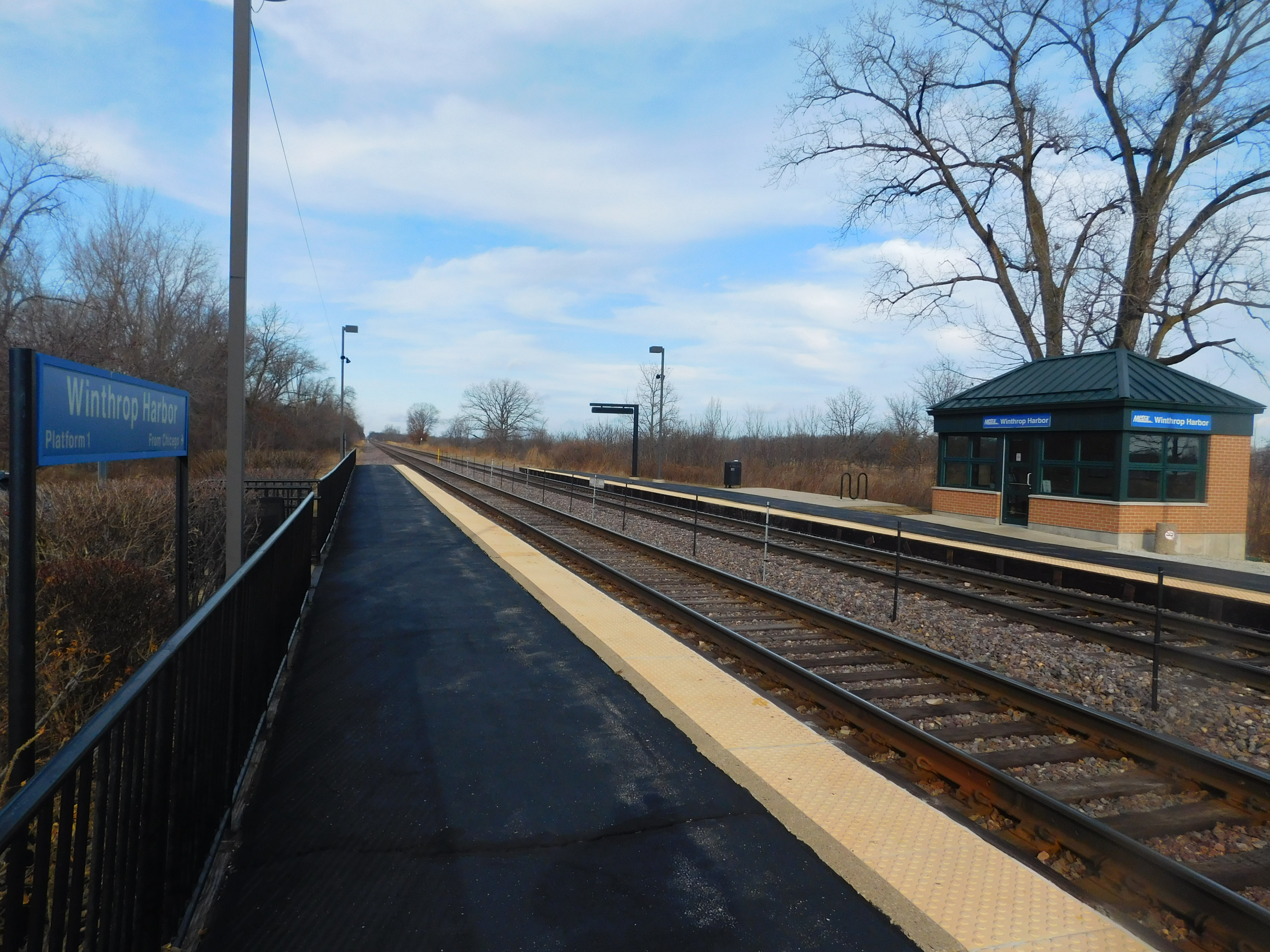
Winthrop Harbor Metra train station

=== Major streets ===
- Sheridan Road
- 9th Street
- Lewis Avenue
- Russell Road
- Kenosha Road
- 7th Street

=== Rail ===
Winthrop Harbor is served by Metra's Union Pacific North Line, at Winthrop Harbor station.

== Public services ==
The village of Winthrop Harbor has a full-time police department and a part-time fire department.

=== Police department ===
The Winthrop Harbor Police Department's full-time officers are supplemented by part-time officers in both Patrol and Specialist positions. The department offers the following bureaus: Patrol, Detectives, Sex Crimes, Communications, CyberCrime, Records, and Evidence/Property. The current Chief is Anthony Velardi.

=== Fire department ===
The Winthrop Harbor Fire Department, founded in 1949, has grown from a small volunteer force to a 24-hour-a-day operation. Currently, part-time employees work overlapping shifts providing a crew 24-hours a day, 7 days a week. These 'on-duty' crews are supplemented with off-duty personnel who respond from home. They work with two engines, a 75-foot ladder truck, two advanced life support ambulances, one brush unit, a rescue boat and a staff and command car. Through automatic aid agreements with the surrounding area, the Village receives optimal emergency service. The current Fire Chief is Rocco Campanella.

== Education ==
Most of Winthrop Harbor is in Winthrop Harbor School District 1 while a portion is in Beach Park Community Consolidated School District 3. All of Winthrop Harbor is in the Zion-Benton Township High School District 126.

== Pollution concerns ==
- In a study released on July 30, 2009, by Forbes.com, Winthrop Harbor's North Point Marina was reported as the seventh most polluted beach in the United States based on samples taken in 2008. North Point Marina has been on this list since 2005, exceeding acceptable contamination levels in 61 percent of tests.
