= Camp Logan (Illinois) =

- Camp Logan National Guard Rifle Range Historic District
- U.S. National Register of Historic Places
- U.S. Historic district
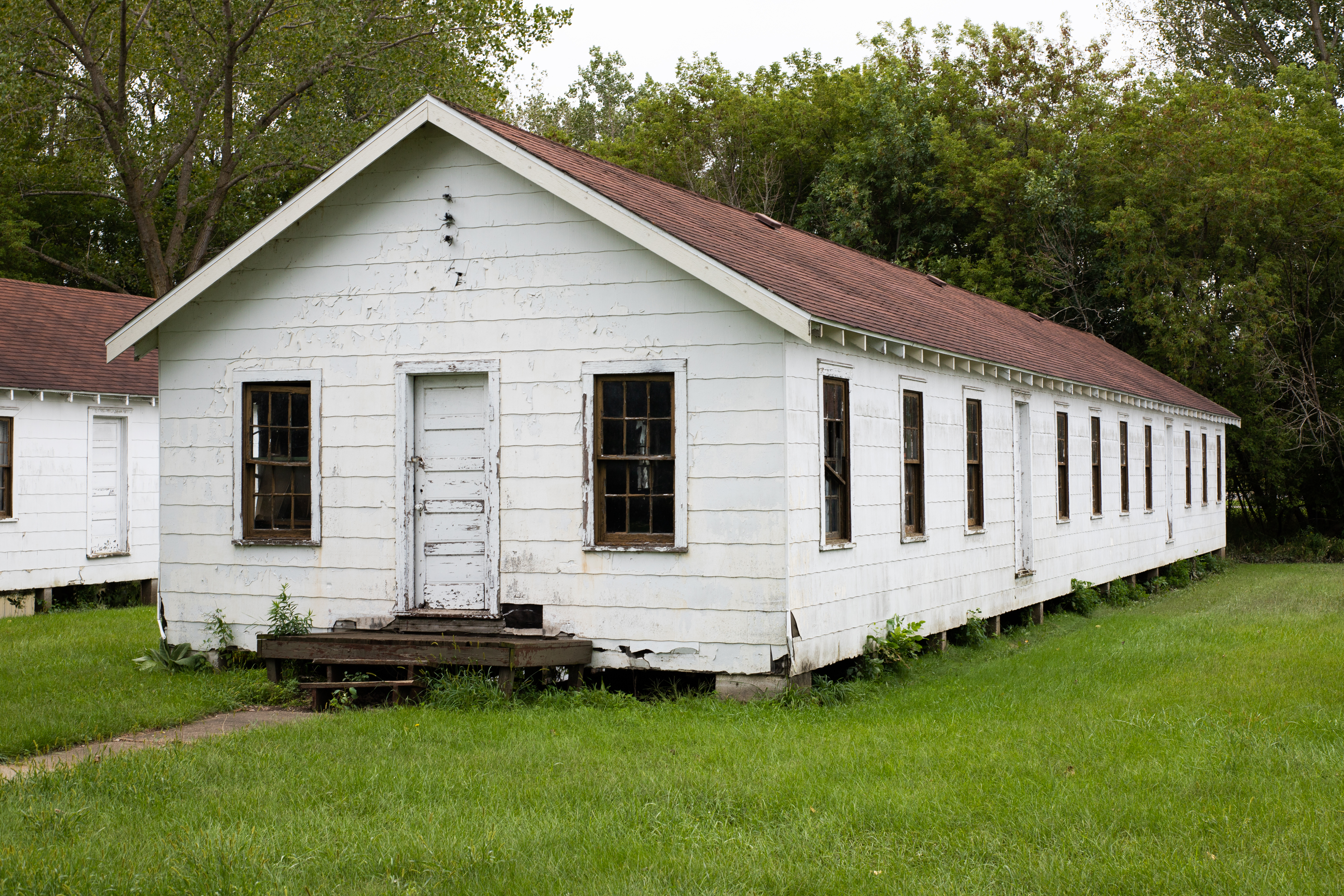

- Location within Illinois Location within the United States
- Location: Illinois Beach State Park, Zion, Illinois
- Coordinates: 42°28′6″N 87°48′31″W
- Area: 0 acres (0 ha)
- Built: 1934
- NRHP reference No.: 00000640
- Added to NRHP: June 09, 2000

Camp Logan, Illinois was an Illinois National Guard base and rifle range from 1892 to the early 1970s. At one time the Camp was 200 acres (0.81 km^{2}). Several buildings survive today as they are listed on the National Register of Historic Places.

Camp Logan was named after General John Alexander Logan.

The Camp Logan site is now part of the Adeline Jay Geo-Karis Illinois Beach State Park.
