= Beach Park Community Consolidated School District 3 =

School district in Illinois, United States

Beach Park School District #3

Location
- 11315 West Wadsworth Road Beach Park, Illinois, 60099; United States

District information
- Type: Public
- Grades: K-8
- Established: May 25, 1946; 80 years ago at Beach Park, Illinois
- Superintendent: Dr. Denise Wilcox
- School board: Marcia White, President Andrea Usry, Vice President; Nicole Harris, Secretary; Andy Luther, Board Member Steve Lenzi, Board Member
- Schools: Beach Park Middle School, Kenneth Murphy, Howe, Oak Crest, and Newport
- NCES District ID: 1700010

Students and staff
- Enrollment: 504 (7-8)
- Athletic conference: Northwest Suburban
- Colors: Red; White; Blue (BPMS)

Other information
- Website: Official website

Beach Park School District 3 is an Illinois school district in the Lake County village of Beach Park. Beach Park School District 3 governs four elementary schools (Oak Crest Elementary School, Howe Elementary School, Newport Elementary School, and Kenneth Murphy Elementary School) and one middle school (Beach Park Middle School).

== Schools ==
=== Kenneth Murphy School ===
Kenneth Murphy School is an elementary school that serves kindergarten through fifth grade. As of 2024, the school's principal is Mrs. Megan Goedken and Ms. Brianne Berry as Assistant Principal.

=== Howe Elementary School ===
Howe School is an elementary school that offers kindergarten through fifth grade. As of 2024, the school's principal is Mr. Chris Anderson.

=== Newport School ===
Newport School is an elementary school that offers kindergarten through fifth grade. As of 2024, the school's principal is Dr. Laurie Garris.

=== Oak Crest School ===
Oak Crest School is an elementary school that offers kindergarten through fifth grade. As of 2024, the school's principal is Ms. Jennifer Convey.

=== Beach Park Middle School ===
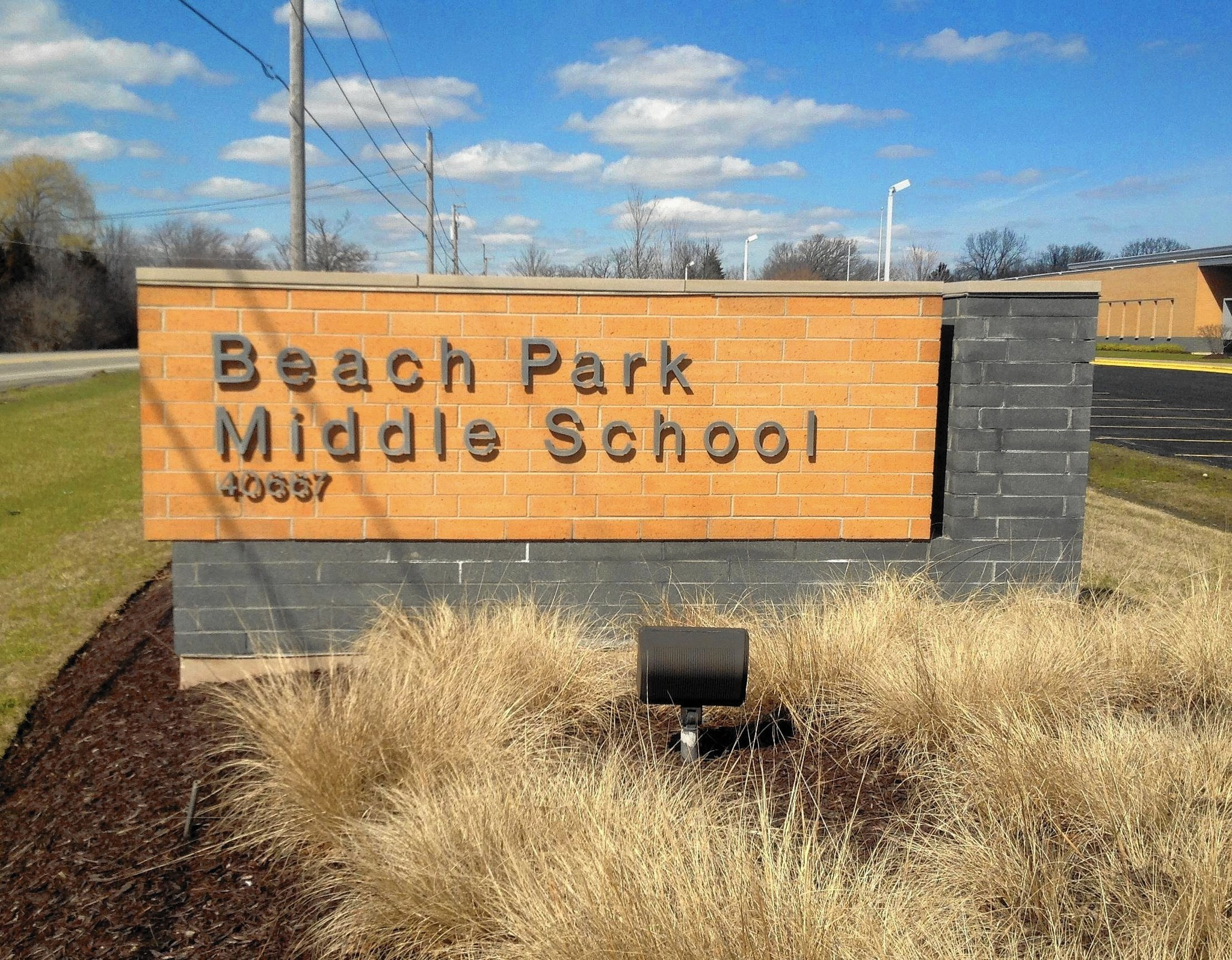
Beach Park Middle School, 40667 N Green Bay Rd, Beach Park

Beach Park School is a Middle school that offers sixth grade through eighth grade. As of 2024, the school's principal is Ms. Stephanie Meek. The assistant principal is Ms. Jennifer Grabot. Mr. Nick Divincenzo. and Mr. John Rovenolt are Dean of Students

== History ==
=== Pre 1838: The original North shore. ===
It's hard to imagine now but from this area to Green Bay was generally considered its own section of the country as roads and non-native settlements were minimal. What life was like for the native Potawatomi tribes that lived here before 1838 we can only imagine based upon the accounts of early immigrant settlers and documented artifacts, of which there are many, in the Newport region of our district. On Sept. 26, 1833, the Potawatomi signed a treaty ceding to the U.S. all their lands in Wisconsin and Illinois, including what is now Lake County, for about $1 million in the second of two "Treaties of Chicago".

=== 1838-1930's: A century of survival in rural Lake County. ===
Around the birth of Lake County in 1938, one of the earliest schools in Benton Township appears to be within our current boundaries, housed at the cabin of Methodist Circuit Preacher, Salmon Stebbins. Salmon Stebbins was an inspired "Methodist Circuit Rider" and passionate public speaker. He was in charge of preaching to a portion of territory that spanned from Benton Township all the way to Green Bay, Wisconsin. He was an important and positive influence as he spent most of his life helping spiritually guide those who settled this area and spent the remainder of his life in and around this region. His daughter Emily Stebbins taught the first class of children in our area from their log cabin. Not many years later, as numbers grew, a portion of the first class moved into a one room schoolhouse funded and constructed by community members on the Howe Family Farm. This was the location of the original Howe School, on the west side of Green Bay Rd. across from 33rd St, until 2002 when the building was taken down for residential development. Over the next century or so, folks around here held on, the best they could, enduring both the Civil War and World War One. Fun fact, the Winthrop Harbor School District didn't have a building for much of this time and would send students to what was then "Howe School District #3" over rough dirt trails by a 2 horse powered "bus".

=== 1930's-1945: It's getting crowded around here. ===
By 1934 the population of our little corner of the world was growing fast, in large part due to the railroad between Chicago and Milwaukee which had a train stop named "Beach Depot". A new larger one room brick building would take the place of the wooden Howe School which was disassembled and sold for a grand total of fifty dollars. This new building saw several large additions over the years to keep up with increasing enrollment.

=== 1946-1968: Happy Birthday Beach Park CCSD#3. ===
Due to increasing population and limited resources, three neighboring districts agreed to join together to create what we now know as Beach Park Community Consolidated School District #3. The three individual, one building, school districts included Howe #3, Beach Park #5 and Bonnie Brook #115. Our BPD3 Birthday is May, 25th 1946. Beach Park School, currently "Oak Crest" was built soon after. In 1966, Oak Crest was built, currently "Kenneth Murphy".

=== 1969-1986: Welcome North Prairie, we have history. ===
North Prairie SD#2 and its school building became part of BPCCSD#3 in 1969. North Prairie School Building was used by the district until 1988 when it was sold to Zion Freedom Chapel. Back around 1840, one of the groups of students originally taught in the cabin of Samuel Stebbins by his daughter Emily, went to a newly built North Prairie Church to continue their education. Welcome back North Prairie, it only took about 140 years!

=== 1987-2002: Newport joins the family with rural spirit. ===
By 1988, having almost been split in half and dissolved by the larger cities to the north and south, our residents joined together with vigor and successfully voted for incorporation. The Village of Beach Park grows to absorb Newport Community Consolidated School District 11. Newport School building, built in 1954 remains as one of our 5 current schools and is a great place to get a feel for what our area may have looked like to the original settlers. It's not surprising to see abundant wildlife passing through, including recently, a flock of migrating white pelicans that stopped for a rest across the street on April 3, 2019.

=== 2003-Present: Time marches on. ===
Hold on to your seats time travelers. Original Howe got taken down, but the namesake survives as it takes the place of "Beach School" like the name "Oak Crest" moved from what is now "Kenneth Murphy" to what was "Beach Park School". "Bonnie Brook Elementary School" and "North Prairie Elementary School" were both sold. Are you keeping up? "Kenneth Murphy Junior High" turns into "Kenneth Murphy Elementary School" to join the three others; "Howe Elementary School" (formerly Beach School, aka Little Beach), "Oak Crest Elementary School" (formerly Beach Park School, aka Big Beach) and "Newport Elementary School and the new "Beach Park Middle School" is built on Green Bay Road, a little north of the site of the first one room wooden school building that sold for fifty dollars so many years ago. Got it? And although housing complexes, subdivisions and small business now take the place of what used to be primarily woodland, prairie and farm fields "way North" of Chicago and "way South" of Milwaukee, time marches on for us now, on the same ground as those before, here, in Beach Park Community Consolidated School District #3.

"In the early days there was good hunting, trapping and fishing. Foxes, wolves and deer were caught. Fish were plentiful; also quail and wild pigeons." -Excerpt from a resident's written historical account passed down over the years
