= North Point Marina =

State park in Illinois, USA

North Point Marina State Recreation Area
- IUCN category V (protected landscape/seascape)
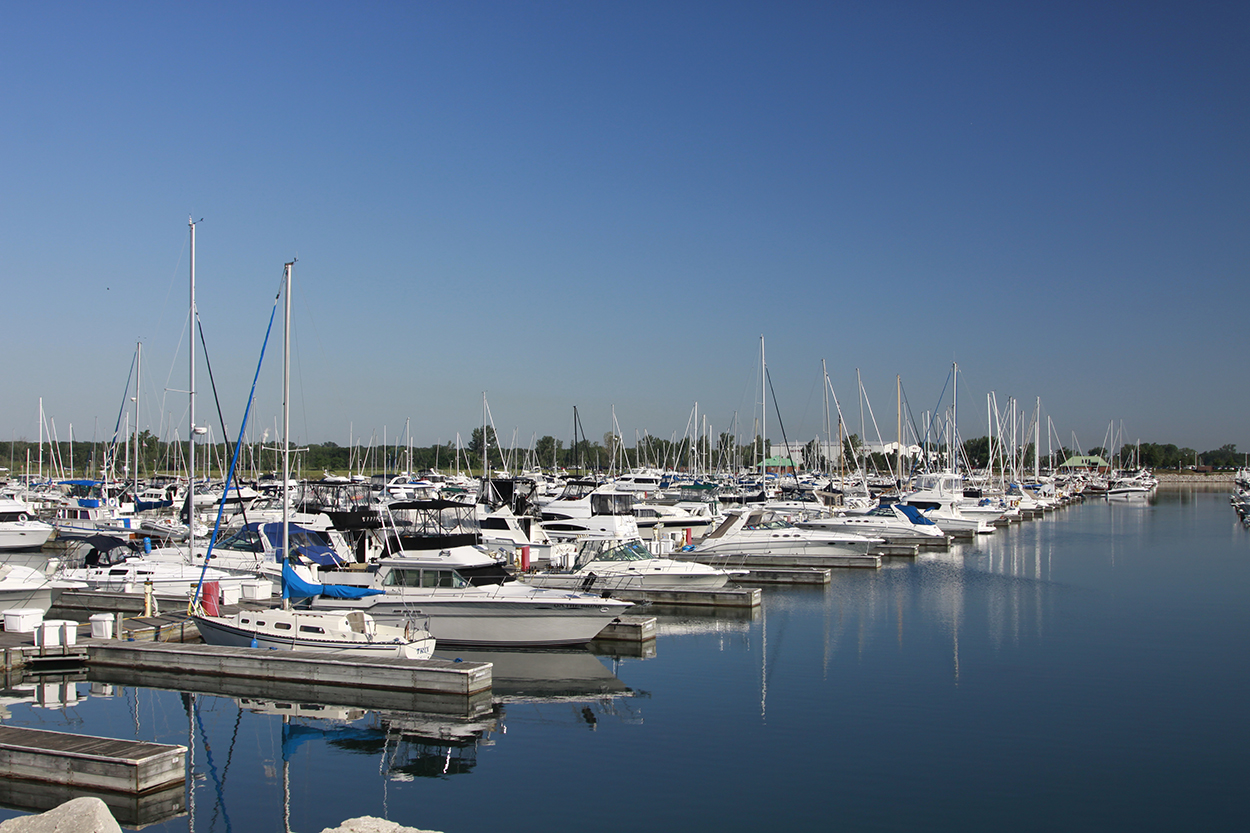

- Location within Illinois Location within the United States
- Location: Lake County, Illinois, USA
- Nearest city: Winthrop Harbor, Illinois
- Coordinates: 42°29′20″N 87°48′14″W
- Area: 297 acres (120 ha)
- Governing body: Illinois Department of Natural Resources

North Point Marina State Recreation Area is a 297 acres (120 ha) Illinois state park in Lake County, Illinois, United States. It has 1,500 slips for the mooring of boats.
