= Zion, Illinois =

City in Illinois, US

- City
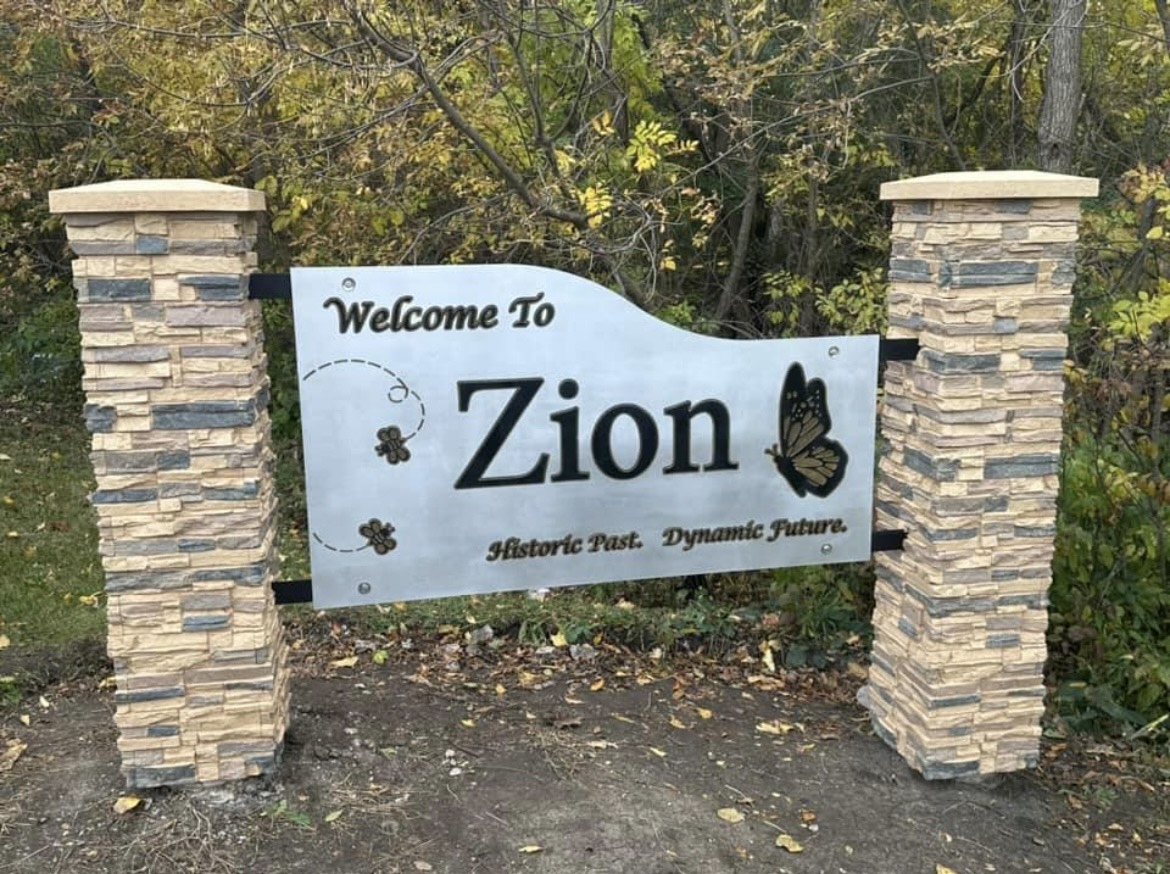
- City of Zion New Signs in 2025

- Seal
- Motto: "Historic past, dynamic future"
- Location of Zion in Lake County, Illinois.
- Coordinates: 42°28′12″N 87°52′07″W
- Country: United States
- State: Illinois
- County: Lake
- Founded: July 1901
- Founder: John Alexander Dowie
- Named for: Mount Zion, Israel

Government
  - Mayor: Billy McKinney

Area
  - Total: 9.93 sq mi (25.72 km^{2})
  - Land: 9.93 sq mi (25.72 km^{2})
  - Water: 0 sq mi (0.00 km^{2})
- Elevation: 692 ft (211 m)

Population (2020)
  - Total: 24,655
  - Density: 2,482.7/sq mi (958.58/km^{2})
- Time zone: UTC-6 (CST)
  - Summer (DST): UTC-5 (CDT)
- ZIP code: 60099
- Area code(s): 847, 224
- FIPS code: 17-84220
- GNIS feature ID: 2397402
- Website: www.cityofzion.com

Zion is a city in Lake County, Illinois, United States. Per the 2020 United States census, the population was 24,655.

== History ==
=== Under Dowie ===
John Alexander Dowie, a preacher and faith healer who immigrated to the United States in 1888, started residing in Chicago in 1893, and established the Christian Catholic Church in 1896. He amassed thousands of followers and claimed to be a prophet. Dowie supported the idea of creating a Christian utopian community in the 1890s. On December 31, 1899, he announced the creation of a settlement for his followers.

Blue Island, Illinois was suggested as a possible location for the settlement in 1895. H. Worthington Judd and Daniel Sloan, deacons in Dowie's church, were sent out to find a site for the settlement. They traveled across Waukegan, Illinois by horse and buggy in December 1898. and believed they found the correct place after receiving an apparent omen in which sun shown after the sky was overcast for the entire day. Dowie purchased 6,500 acres of land in Lake County, Illinois in 1899 and publicly announced the purchase in 1901.

Lace factory in Zion, 1911

Samuel Stevenson, an English lace manufacturer, moved his business to Zion and was ordained as a deacon in 1900; the Zion Lace Industries started with a capital of $1 million. All profits earned by this company, beyond those used for dividends, belonged to Dowie. Lace production started on June 24, 1901. Workers recruited for Zion were arrested in November 1901 for violating the Alien Contract Labor Law; the Board of Inquiry of the Immigration Bureau ruled against Zion, but Secretary of the Treasury Lyman J. Gage ruled in Zion's favor on appeal. The first permanent building for the lace business was completed in March 1902. The first mayor was Richard H. Harper.

Burton J. Ashley was the city engineer for Zion and laid out the city across 10 square miles. Dowie's religious beliefs prohibited gambling halls, hospitals, saloons, drug and tobacco shops, and other churches. The consecration of the church in 1900 was attended by around 10,000 people. Zion had 200 buildings in Zion by September 1901, over 300 houses by 1902, and 2,000 houses by 1905. A post office was secured for Zion in March 1902 after Dowie and his wife met with President Theodore Roosevelt.

All of the land in Zion was personally owned by Dowie in fee simple and he operated as a landlord for all of the residents. The lease was for 1,100 years as Dowie believed that Jesus would return in 2000 and ruled for 1,000 years. The headquarters of his church was moved from Chicago to Zion in 1902, and Dowie started to permanently reside in Zion.

Dowie supported the Republican Party and directed his followers to vote for Republican presidential candidates. The Theocratic Party was established on April 7, 1902, and controlled Zion; all political offices were won by the party without opposition. Visscher V. Barnes, a leader in the Prohibition Party, was made Solicitor General for Zion in 1902, and later appointed as city attorney and judge of Zion's Court of Arbitration.

Creditors started to request their money in 1903. One petitioner, seeking $1,169 from Zion, filed a claim and the total claims against Zion rose to $70,000 after other creditors joined the lawsuit. The United States District Court appointed receivers on December 1, but issued an injunction the next day after Dowie convinced the creditors that Zion a $14 million surplus; the receivership was dissolved on December 9. The bankruptcy petition was dismissed in July 1905.

An expanded Shiloh Tabernacle with Byzantine styling, 330 by 340 feet in area, and seating for 16,000 was planned in 1903 at a cost of $400,000–500,000, but construction never progressed past excavation.

A triumvirate was formed by Barnes, Alexander Granger, and John G. Speicher. Dowie gave power of attorney to this group when he went to the Caribbean in order to improve his health in 1905. The city was suffering from financial strain and raw material shortages. The triumvirate announced a reorganization of the economic structure on December 20, 1905; the previous Zion headquarters in Chicago was sold and workers were told to find employment in Waukegan and Kenosha. Private industries, rather than the profit sharing business set up by Dowie, were formed. Dowie, who was still ill in the Caribbean, sent for Wilbur Glenn Voliva, who was in Australia, to replace the triumvirate and he received power of attorney as Deputy General Overseer. Dowie opposed the new economic policies and demanded that Granger be removed, but a telegram from Voliva and other leaders on April 2, 1906 criticized Dowie for his "extravagance, hypocrisy, misrepresentations, exaggerations, misuse of investments, tyranny and injustice" and removed all of his powers.

A legal dispute over who owned Zion's land broke out in 1906. Voliva argued that Dowie was only the trustee and not the sole owner. Judge Kenesaw Mountain Landis ruled on July 27, 1906, that Dowie was a trustee. Dowie died on March 9, 1907.

=== Under Voliva ===
Voliva became the sole owner of Zion's land in 1911 by floating a $950,000 bond issue.

Dowie also founded the Zion Tabernacle of the Christian Catholic Apostolic Church, which was the only church in town. The structure was built in the early 1900s and was burned down in 1937, following several decades of tumultuous rule by Dowie's successor, Wilbur Glenn Voliva.

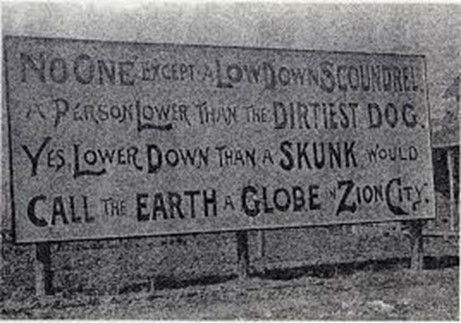
Flat Earth sign by Flat Earth theorist Wilbur Glenn Voliva

Until the 1940s, Zion enshrined the Flat Earth doctrine in its religious code.

Voliva died in 1942 and was succeeded by Michael J. Mintern as overseer.

=== Modern ===
The former city seal was the subject of a 1990 Federal Court case, because it featured a crown and scepter, a dove, a cross, and the words "God Reigns". The founder of Zion and designer of the city seal, John Alexander Dowie, intended for these to be Christian symbols and added them "for the purpose of the extension of the Kingdom of God upon earth ... where God shall rule in every department of family, industry, commercial, educational, ecclesiastical and political life". The court ruled the city could not use these religious symbols in its seals and emblems. While the Christian symbolism was removed, the phrase "In God We Trust" could be used on the new city seal since it was already acceptable religious language in the public area.

== Geography ==
According to the 2021 census gazetteer files, Zion has a total area of 9.93 square miles (25.72 km^{2}), of which 9.93 square miles (25.72 km^{2}) (or 99.99%) is land and 0.00 square miles (0.00 km^{2}) (or 0.01%) is water.

Location within Lake County

== Demographics ==
Historical population
Census	Pop.	Note	%±
1910	4,789		—
1920	5,580		16.5%
1930	5,991		7.4%
1940	6,555		9.4%
1950	8,950		36.5%
1960	11,941		33.4%
1970	17,268		44.6%
1980	17,865		3.5%
1990	19,775		10.7%
2000	22,866		15.6%
2010	24,413		6.8%
2020	24,655		1.0%
U.S. Decennial Census; 2010 2020

John Alexander Duclo, the first boy born in Zion, was born on October 29, 1900; the first girl was also born that month. Fourteen families were living in Zion by November.

Around 200 black people lived in Zion by 1906.

=== Racial and ethnic composition ===
Zion city, Illinois – Racial and ethnic composition Note: the US Census treats Hispanic/Latino as an ethnic category. This table excludes Latinos from the racial categories and assigns them to a separate category. Hispanics/Latinos may be of any race.
Race / Ethnicity (NH = Non-Hispanic)	Pop 2000	Pop 2010	Pop 2020	% 2000	% 2010	% 2020
White alone (NH)	12,120	8,787	5,808	53.00%	35.99%	23.56%
Black or African American alone (NH)	6,051	7,391	7,484	26.46%	30.27%	30.35%
Native American or Alaska Native alone (NH)	58	53	55	0.25%	0.22%	0.22%
Asian alone (NH)	408	546	534	1.78%	2.24%	2.17%
Native Hawaiian or Pacific Islander alone (NH)	7	10	15	0.03%	0.04%	0.06%
Other race alone (NH)	78	129	177	0.34%	0.53%	0.72%
Mixed race or Multiracial (NH)	657	739	1,100	2.87%	3.03%	4.46%
Hispanic or Latino (any race)	3,487	6,758	9,482	15.25%	27.68%	38.46%
Total	22,866	24,413	24,655	100.00%	100.00%	100.00%

=== 2020 census ===
As of the 2020 census, Zion had a population of 24,655. The population density was 2,482.38 inhabitants per square mile (958.45/km^{2}). The median age was 34.4 years. 27.4% of residents were under the age of 18 and 11.9% of residents were 65 years of age or older. For every 100 females there were 91.8 males, and for every 100 females age 18 and over there were 86.6 males age 18 and over.

99.9% of residents lived in urban areas, while 0.1% lived in rural areas.

There were 8,542 households and 5,394 families in Zion, of which 39.1% had children under the age of 18 living in them. Of all households, 40.2% were married-couple households, 17.8% were households with a male householder and no spouse or partner present, and 35.6% were households with a female householder and no spouse or partner present. About 26.0% of all households were made up of individuals and 10.0% had someone living alone who was 65 years of age or older.

There were 9,295 housing units at an average density of 935.86 per square mile (361.34/km^{2}), of which 8.1% were vacant. The homeowner vacancy rate was 2.9% and the rental vacancy rate was 8.6%.

Racial composition as of the 2020 census
Race	Number	Percent
White	7,080	28.7%
Black or African American	7,686	31.2%
American Indian and Alaska Native	476	1.9%
Asian	550	2.2%
Native Hawaiian and Other Pacific Islander	21	0.1%
Some other race	5,296	21.5%
Two or more races	3,546	14.4%
Hispanic or Latino (of any race)	9,482	38.5%

== Economy ==
Dowie was opposed to unions and threatened to prosecute those who attempted to form unions. An eight-hour work day was established for city projects and the lace factory by Dowie in 1902.

The median income for a household in the city was $56,819, and the median income for a family was $66,803. Males had a median income of $37,319 versus $29,416 for females. The per capita income for the city was $23,345. About 12.5% of families and 14.3% of the population were below the poverty line, including 18.3% of those under age 18 and 9.5% of those age 65 or over.

== Sports ==
Three baseball teams (Blues, Golds, and Whites) were formed in 1903.

The 8,500-seat Fielders Stadium was planned to open in May 2010, and was to host home games for the Lake County Fielders, the North American League baseball team co-owned by the actor Kevin Costner. The Fielders' name is an homage to Costner's 1989 film Field of Dreams, with the logo showing a ballplayer standing in a field of corn.

Fielders Stadium has been subject to a court dispute between its owners and the city over a breach in contract, and was never completed before the Fielders folded.

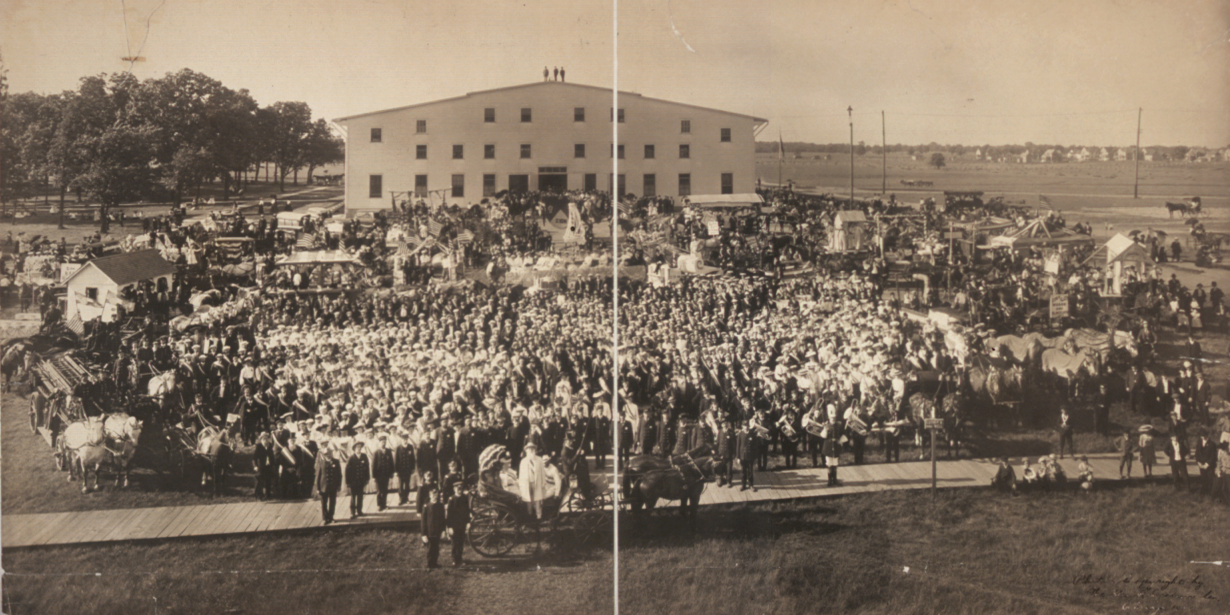
Zion Industries at Shiloh Tabernacle, July 1904, Zion City, Illinois

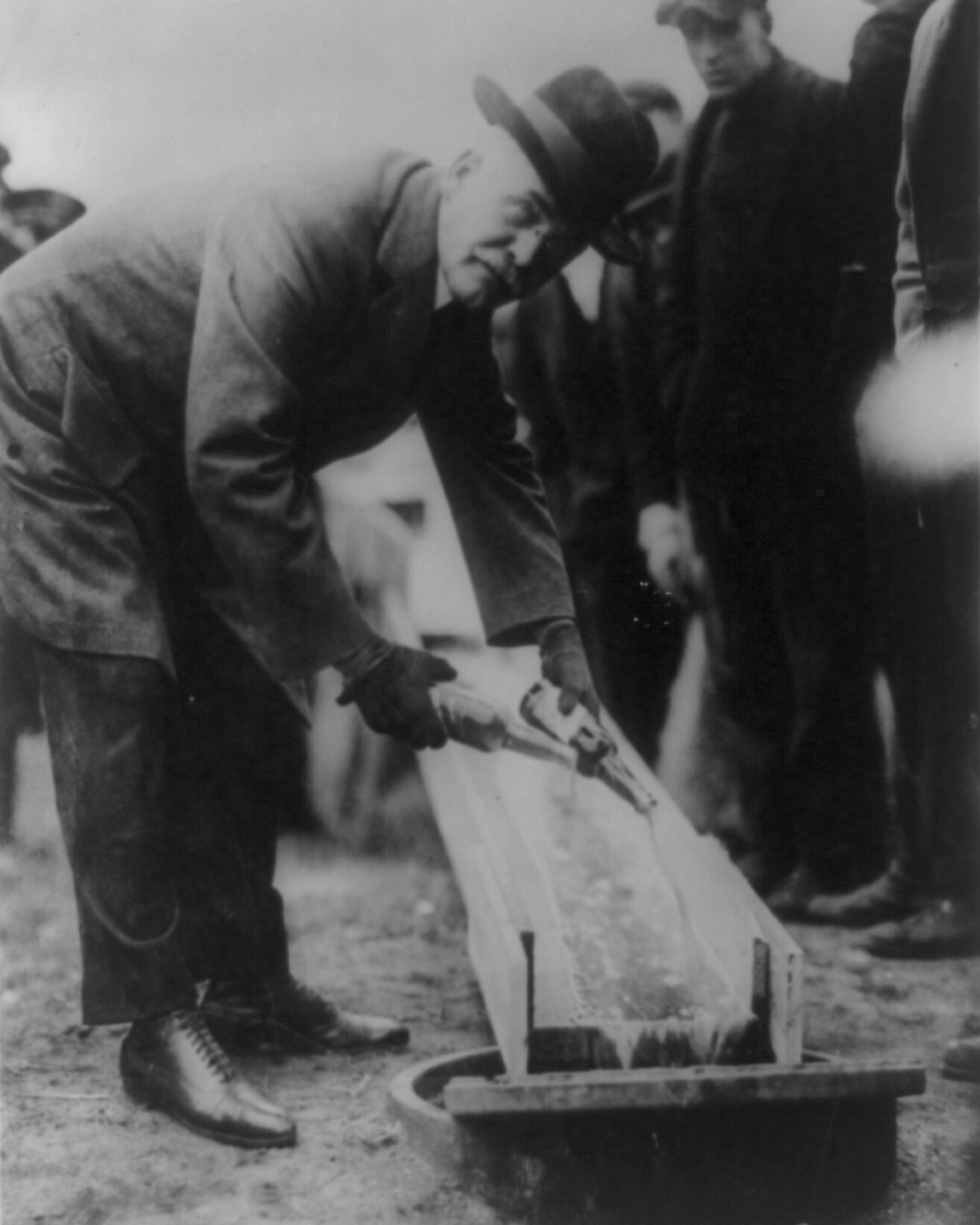
Man pouring two bottles of beer into trough into the sewer system during Prohibition in 1921, detail, from- Zion City, Ill., destroys 80,000 pint bottles of beer

== Parks and recreation ==
=== Illinois Beach State Park ===
Zion is the closest municipality to South Beach within Illinois Beach State Park. The North Beach is in Winthrop Harbor. The beach was originally part of Camp Logan, developed in 1892 as a rifle range by the Illinois National Guard. In World War I and World War II, it served as a rifle range for the Great Lakes Naval Training Station. The range remained in operation until 1973, when it was transferred to the Illinois Department of Conservation.

In 1950, the Illinois Dunes Preservation Society was established to maintain the natural qualities of the beach. With the help of the Illinois Department of Conservation, the area south of Beach Road was established as the state's first natural preserve. The sections of the northern beach, between Beach Road and the Wisconsin state border, were acquired by the state between 1971 and 1982.

The Illinois Beach Resort and Conference Center is located at the south beach. The North Point Marina, one of the largest in the Great Lakes region, is at the north beach. It is Illinois' largest marina.

On May 9, 2000, the area encompassing Illinois Beach State Park and North Point Marina was officially designated as the Cullerton Complex in honor of William J. Cullerton Sr., a war hero, avid environmentalist, and long-time friend of conservation.

== Education ==
Elementary school districts covering sections of Zion include Zion Elementary School District 6 and Beach Park Community Consolidated School District 3, while the section of Zion in Winthrop Harbor School District 1 is parkland. All of Zion is in the Zion-Benton Township High School District 126.

== Media ==
The bi-weekly The Coming City and Dowie's Leaves of Healing were the newspapers published in Zion at the time of its foundation.

== Infrastructure ==
=== Transportation ===
==== Highways ====
- Illinois Route 131
- Illinois Route 137
- Illinois Route 173

County roads:

- A1 (Russell Road)
- A4 (9th Street)
- A6 (21st Street)
- A8 (33rd Street)
- A9 (Wadsworth Road)
- W32 (Kenosha Road)
- W34 (Lewis Avenue)

==== Public Transit ====
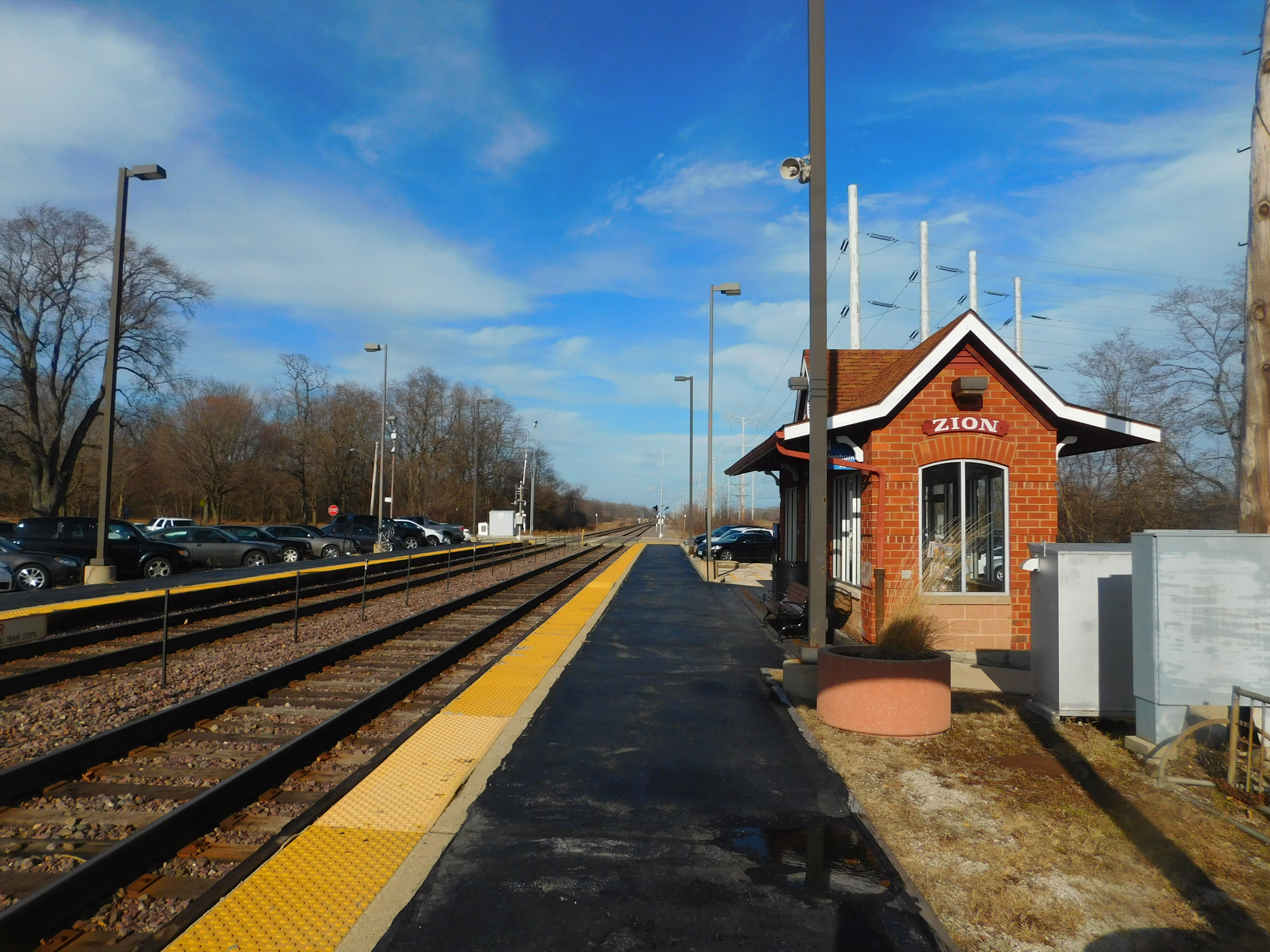
The Zion Metra station in January 2019

Zion is served by:

- Metra's Union Pacific/North Line at the Zion railway station.
- Pace Bus

==== Bikeways and Trails ====
Zion is served by the Robert McClory Bike Path. There is a bike lane on a section of 21st Street that is maintained by the Lake County Division of Transportation and there are several smaller trails maintained by the Zion Park District.

==== Air ====
Zion is located just north-east of the Waukegan National Airport, which provides general aviation service. There nearest airports to Zion that provide commercial air service include Chicago O'Hare International Airport (ORD), Milwaukee Mitchell International Airport (MKE), and Chicago Midway International Airport (MDW).

==== Railway ====
Zion is at the midpoint of the Chicago North Shore and Milwaukee Railroad. Work on the railroad started in 1904 and was completed in 1905.

== Notable people ==
- Jorge Avila-Torrez, serial killer
- Jarvis Brown, member of 1991 World Series champion Minnesota Twins
- Richard Bull, actor, "Nels Olson" on Little House on the Prairie
- Gary Coleman, actor, "Arnold Jackson" on Diff'rent Strokes
- Joe Daniels, drummer for Local H
- John Alexander Dowie, founder of Zion
- Paul Erickson, baseball player, mostly with Chicago Cubs
- John Hammond, senior adviser of the Orlando Magic and former general manager of the Milwaukee Bucks
- Richard H. Harper, first mayor of Zion
- James Gordon Lindsay, pastor and founder of Christ for the Nations Institute
- Scott Lucas, lead singer, bassist and guitarist for Local H
- Billy McKinney, former NBA player; current head scout for the Milwaukee Bucks and mayor of Zion
- Juan Moreno, two-time Olympic silver medalist; assistant coach with the U.S. Olympic Team at the 2008 Olympics
- Russell Nype, star of Broadway's Call Me Madam and Hello, Dolly! and Tony Award winner
- Shoes, power pop band including Gary Klebe, Jeff Murphy, John Murphy
- Lenzelle Smith Jr., basketball player in the Israel Basketball Premier League

== See also ==
- Zion Nuclear Power Station

== Works cited ==
- Cook, Philip (1996). Zion City, Illinois: Twentieth-Century Utopia. Syracuse University Press. ISBN 0815626215.

== Bibliography ==
- Wallace, Irving (1957). Square Pegs: Some Americans Who Dared to Be Different. New York: Knopf. p. 315.
