= Kenosha (disambiguation) =

Kenosha may refer to:

== Events ==
- Kenosha protests, aftermath of the shooting of Jacob Blake in 2020

== Places in the United States ==
=== Colorado ===
- Kenosha Pass, a high mountain route in the Rocky Mountains

=== Nebraska ===
- Kenosha, Nebraska, a former Missouri River crossing on Kenosha Creek, downstream of Rock Bluff in Cass County, Nebraska; now a ghost town

=== Wisconsin ===
- Kenosha, Wisconsin, a city on the southwestern shore of Lake Michigan
  - Kenosha station, a commuter rail station in Kenosha, Wisconsin
- Kenosha County, Wisconsin, a jurisdiction in the southeastern corner of the state
- Kenosha Sand Dunes, a feature on the northern tip of the Chiwaukee Prairie Natural Area

== Organizations ==
- Kenosha Comets, a women's professional baseball team that played from 1943 through 1951
- Kenosha Kingfish, a collegiate summer baseball league

== See also ==
- USS Kenosha
- Konosha, Russia
