= Pleasant Prairie, Wisconsin =

Village in Wisconsin, United States

- Village
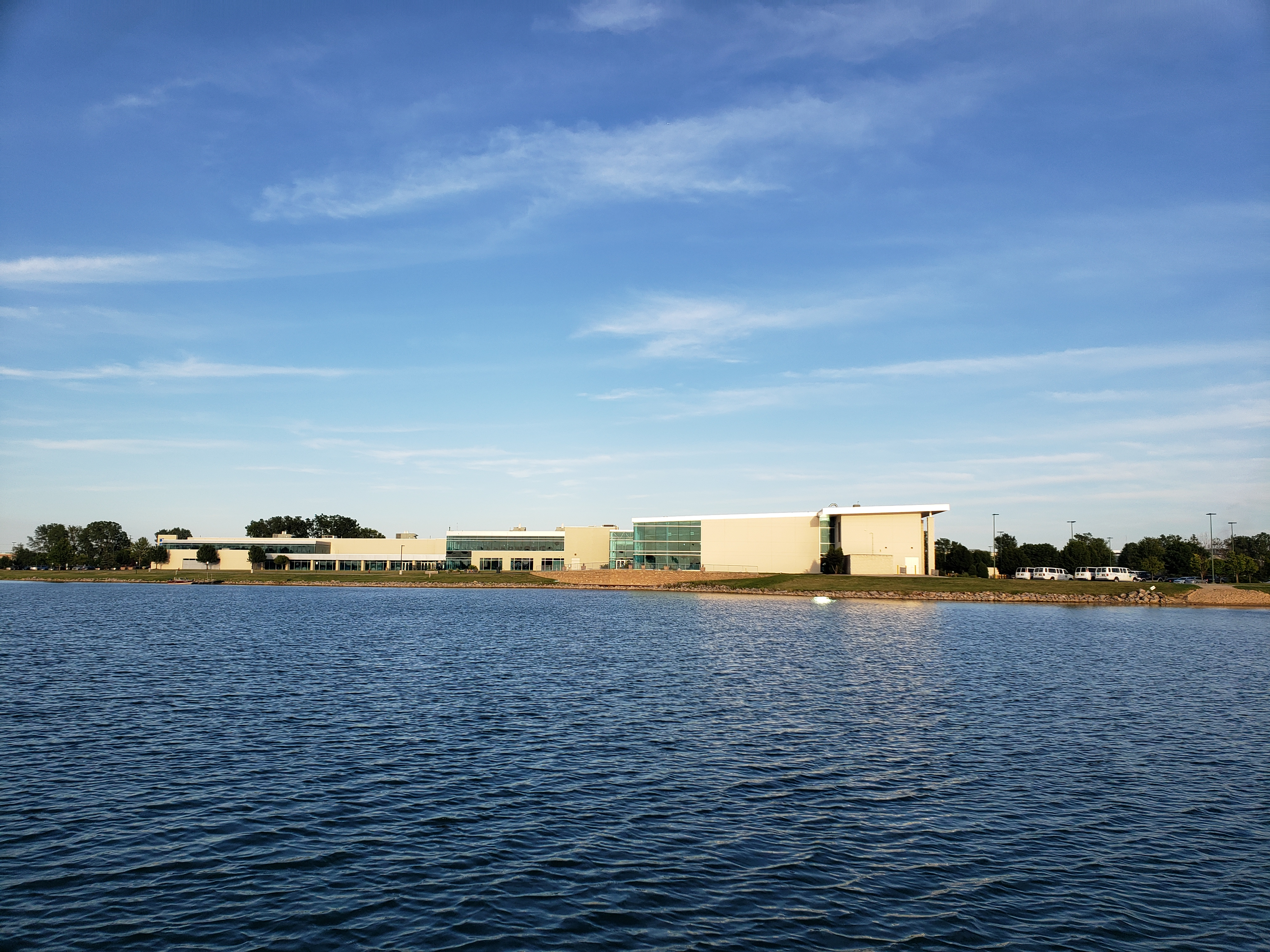
- RecPlex on Lake Andrea

- Location of Pleasant Prairie in Kenosha County, Wisconsin

- Location within Wisconsin Location within the United States
- Coordinates: 42°32′20″N 87°52′13″W
- Country: United States
- State: Wisconsin
- County: Kenosha

Area
  - Total: 33.69 sq mi (87.25 km^{2})
  - Land: 33.38 sq mi (86.45 km^{2})
  - Water: 0.31 sq mi (0.80 km^{2})
- Elevation: 696 ft (212 m)

Population (2020)
  - Total: 21,250
  - Density: 630.2/sq mi (243.31/km^{2})
- Time zone: UTC-6 (Central (CST))
  - Summer (DST): UTC-5 (CDT)
- ZIP Code: 53158
- Area code: 262
- FIPS code: 55-63300
- GNIS feature ID: 1583935
- Website: pleasantprairiewi.gov

Pleasant Prairie is a village in Kenosha County, Wisconsin, United States. Located along the southwestern shoreline of Lake Michigan, the village is south of the city of Kenosha and north of the Wisconsin-Illinois state line. It is part of the Kenosha, WI Metropolitan Statistical Area and the Chicago–Naperville, IL–IN–WI Combined Statistical Area. Among its notable features are the RecPlex and Chiwaukee Prairie. Pleasant Prairie was home to 21,250 people at the 2020 census.

== History ==
The Pleasant Prairie area was the center of Native American activity in pre-pioneer Wisconsin. Some of the earliest traces of Native American life in Wisconsin have been found along State Highway 32 and State Highway 165, Barnes Creek, and in the Carol Beach area.

The early Native American campsites were located along what was once the shoreline of Lake Michigan. Pleasant Prairie also saw pioneers arrive in Wisconsin on the Jambeau Trail, now known as Green Bay Road. In addition, several natural historic sites such as the Chiwaukee Prairie and the Kenosha Sand Dunes lie undisturbed in Pleasant Prairie.

=== Settlement ===
The area's first white settler was Horace Woodbridge, who arrived on June 4, 1833; Henry Miller arrived later that same month. Pleasant Prairie had its beginnings as a political entity in April 1842 when the first town meeting was held and the first election of town officials took place. The early town officials met in the Williams Congregational Church located at 93rd Street and Green Bay Road. Later the old church became the town hall. Pleasant Prairie originally was a town nearly 42 square miles (110 km^{2}) in size.

Over the next 150 years, the city of Kenosha began to annex lands south of 60th Street and west from Lake Michigan. The town of Pleasant Prairie was slowly reduced in size as Kenosha grew. There were nine separate settlement areas in the town that in some cases became the starting point for significant growth. Some no longer exist.

The original unincorporated community of Pleasant Prairie was located at 104th Avenue and Bain Station Road.

=== Gunpowder plant catastrophe ===
In the early 20th century, Pleasant Prairie was the site of a 190-acre DuPont blasting powder plant. The plant, including 40 buildings, had an ongoing record of accidents. In 1909, residents of Kenosha County brought suit against the company on the grounds that the plant was a public menace. The suit was won by the company.

On March 9, 1911, most of the town was destroyed by the explosion of five magazines holding 300 tons of dynamite, 105,000 kegs of black blasting powder, and five nearby rail cars holding dynamite housed at the plant. The explosions rendered most houses within five miles of the blast center uninhabitable. Several hundred people were injured, and three plant employees, E. S. "Old Man" Thompson, Clarence Brady and Joseph Flynt, along with Alice Finch, who dropped dead of fright, were killed. The low death toll was attributed to the plant being closed at the time of the explosion. A crater 100 feet deep was blasted under the former dynamite house. Damage estimates were put at $1,500,000, equivalent to $37,000,000 in 2015. Almost equal damage was done in Bristol, four miles west of Pleasant Prairie.

The force of the explosion was felt more than 130 miles in every direction and was heard as far away as Ohio and Iowa. Many in the Midwest at first believed it was an earthquake. Residents in nearby Lake County, Illinois, saw the fireball and remembering the Peshtigo fire fled their houses, jumping into Lake Michigan. Police in Chicago scoured the streets, looking for the site of a bombing. Windows were shattered as far away as Madison, Wisconsin, a distance of some 85 miles. Concerns about looting and vandalism by curiosity seekers prompted Kenosha County Sheriff Andrew Stahl to impress a hundred deputies and clear the village.

It was believed the first explosion took place in the glaze house where more than 1,100 kegs of powder were dried in steel cylinders. One steel cylinder crashed through the roof of the general store of H. A. and E. A. King, tearing a hole five feet in diameter through the roof, the first and second floor and into the earth. H. A. King, in an adjoining room, was thrown to the floor unconscious by the shock. Phil Hess, a farmer near Truesdell, Wisconsin over two miles from the factory, lost his right ear, severed by a piece of flying glass as he was entering his home. J. H. Beland of Truesdell lost his eye from flying glass, and E. A. Fox, a farmer, bled heavily when a vein in his wrist was cut.

A DuPont spokesman was reported as being perplexed by the coverage of the blast, quoted as saying "explosions occur every day in steel mills, flouring mills and grain elevators with hardly a line in the paper."

The site is the location of residential homes and Pleasant Prairie Park, which is used for softball and soccer.

=== Establishing independence ===
Throughout much of its history, the town of Pleasant Prairie struggled to maintain its independence and identity apart from Kenosha, its larger neighbor to the north.

In 1961, the village hall moved from the former Williams Congregational Church site to rented office space in a small commercial center located on 22nd Avenue and 91st Street.

In 1967, the village government moved into a newly constructed municipal building on Springbrook Road and 39th Avenue that provided office, an auditorium, Fire Department apparatus room, and sleeping quarters.

In 1984, the town and the city of Kenosha agreed upon a plan for the orderly development and fixed boundaries for the town in exchange for an acknowledged right of property owners in various locations along the village/city border to be annexed into the city of Kenosha. A significant provision of this agreement gave Kenosha the ability to annex lands north of State Highway 50 from Green Bay Road to I-94, where the Southport Plaza shopping center, WhiteCaps subdivision, River Crossing subdivision, and Aurora Hospital are located. In exchange, Pleasant Prairie was granted the ability to protect the rest of its area from annexations and to purchase sewer and water from Kenosha.

=== Becoming a village ===
In 1989, the town of Pleasant Prairie was incorporated as a village by a referendum of more than 3,000 citizens in favor and 300 against. The new boundaries were fixed and the new village, along with the WisPark Corporation, began the development of LakeView Corporate Park, a center of employment for more than 8,000 people.

In 1997, eight years after the incorporation of the town into a village, the Municipal Building was updated and increased in size to accommodate village operations.

== Geography ==
Pleasant Prairie is located at 42°32′20″N 87°52′13″W (42.538820, –87.870229).

According to the United States Census Bureau, the village has a total area of 33.64 square miles (87.13 km^{2}), of which 33.33 square miles (86.32 km^{2}) is land and 0.31 square miles (0.80 km^{2}) is water.

=== Neighborhoods ===
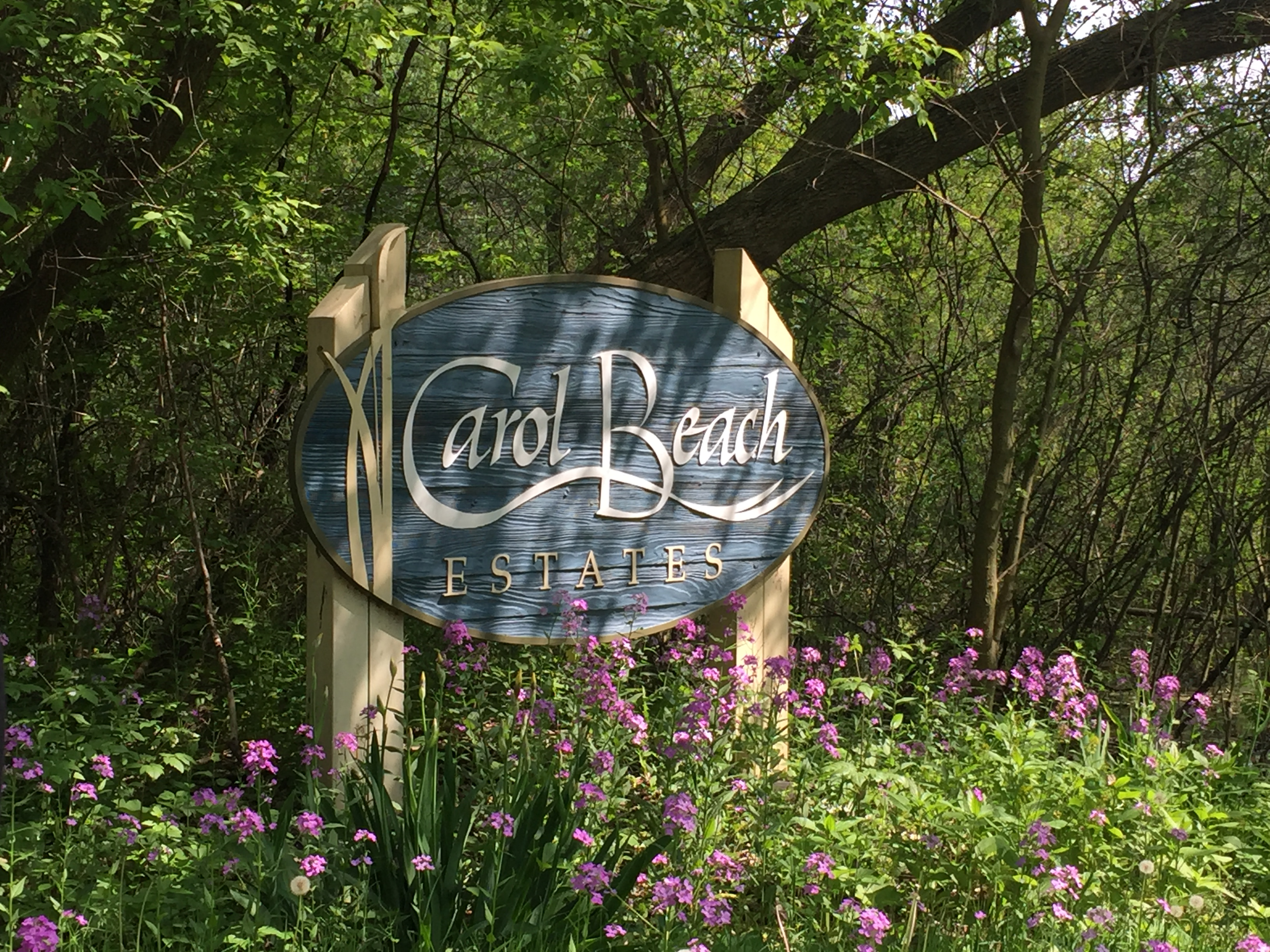
Carol Beach

==== Carol Beach ====
Carol Beach is a residential neighborhood located in Pleasant Prairie. It is generally bordered by Lake Michigan to the east, the Wisconsin-Illinois border to the south, Sheridan Road (Wisconsin State Highway 32) to the west, and the Kenosha Sand Dunes to the north.

Carol Beach traces its roots to 1921, the year that J. H. Penny & Sons purchased land south of 116th Street. Their development was called "Chiwaukee On the Lake," named for being halfway between Chicago and Milwaukee. It included the mansion owned by Fred P. Fischer, which was leased by Joe Louis in 1937 while he trained at the Lakefront Stadium in Kenosha.

In 1924, Edith Rockefeller McCormick of Chicago, the daughter of John D. Rockefeller and daughter-in-law of reaper inventor Cyrus McCormick, purchased a 1,554-acre (6 km^{2}) land parcel to found a new community which soon adopted the name "Chiwaukee" (the area is nearly equidistant between Chicago and Milwaukee, Wisconsin). Chiwaukee was to have its own business district, golf course and playground, and its homes were to be constructed in the Tudor style. Some locals recall a promotional arch constructed over Sheridan Road to inform passersby of the new, planned community. A street network was installed, with Lake Shore Drive as the main thoroughfare.

A national contest was announced to select a permanent name for the new community. Elmer Huge of La Porte, Indiana won a $1,500 prize for his winning submission: "Edithton Beach".

When the Great Depression struck, McCormick's debts mounted and the project collapsed. The curbs and streets leading nowhere were the only visible reminders of the failed project until 1946, when local real-estate investor and developer Joseph Shaffron bought it, renamed it "Carol Beach" for his young daughter, and promoted the community as a "second Evanston, Illinois." Some modest homes began to be built at that time.

The area is one of the most significant wetland areas in the United States and was largely protected through a compromise land use agreement between the Town of Pleasant Prairie, Kenosha County, the State of Wisconsin, and the Army Corps of Engineers. The areas that can be developed have been, and the state of Wisconsin and the Nature conservancy continue to buy remaining properties for prairie land preservation. These undeveloped tracts of land, including the Kenosha Sand Dunes, constitute the Chiwaukee Prairie.

==== Dexter's Corner ====
Dexter's Corner is a residential and agricultural community within the village of Pleasant Prairie. It is located at the intersection of Wisconsin Highway 31 and Springbrook Road. The area is named for the pioneer John Dexter family, the patriarch of which was a veteran of the War of 1812. The red-brick Dexter residence is located to the north of the intersection.

==== Ranney ====
Ranney also known as Rogers Siding is a ghost town in Pleasant Prairie. It is located at the intersection of Bain Station Road and the Canadian Pacific Railroad, originally the Chicago, Milwaukee, St. Paul & Pacific Railroad). The last passenger train stopped at the Ranney Station prior to 1862, but the Ranney post office opened in 1885 and lasted into 1906.

The Bain Station of the KD Line was located just east of Ranney, and remained into the 1940s. Rogers Siding itself was a KD Line team track just west of Green Bay Road for area farmers who would load their produce for rail shipments; the siding itself was removed in the 1980s. The last house in Ranney, the former KD Line yardmaster's house, was demolished in 2003, and the area is now devoid of all traces of community except for continuing railroad activity on the KD Line and the Canadian Pacific. Much of the property there is now owned by We Energies.

==== Tobin ====
Tobin is an area along 116th Street in Pleasant Prairie. The community is named for early settler Patrick Tobin. Tobin's most famous visitors included boxer Joe Louis, who would arrive and depart at the Tobin station on the Chicago North Shore and Milwaukee Railroad interurban in the mid-1930s, to train at the Ham Fisher mansion in nearby Carol Beach, and to supervise the Joe Louis Boxing Camps held at Lakefront Stadium.

== Demographics ==
Historical population
| Census | Pop. | Note | %± |
|---|---|---|---|
| 1990 | 11,961 | | — |
| 2000 | 16,136 | | 34.9% |
| 2010 | 19,719 | | 22.2% |
| 2020 | 21,250 | | 7.8% |
| 2023 (est.) | 21,818 | ▲ | 2.7% |
U.S. Decennial Census

=== Racial and ethnic composition ===
Pleasant Prairie village, Wisconsin – Racial and ethnic composition Note: the US Census treats Hispanic/Latino as an ethnic category. This table excludes Latinos from the racial categories and assigns them to a separate category. Hispanics/Latinos may be of any race.
| Race / Ethnicity (NH = Non-Hispanic) | Pop 2000 | Pop 2010 | Pop 2020 | % 2000 | % 2010 | % 2020 |
|---|---|---|---|---|---|---|
| White alone (NH) | 14,862 | 17,246 | 17,212 | 92.10% | 87.46% | 81.00% |
| Black or African American alone (NH) | 230 | 459 | 565 | 1.43% | 2.33% | 2.66% |
| Native American or Alaska Native alone (NH) | 60 | 52 | 41 | 0.37% | 0.26% | 0.19% |
| Asian alone (NH) | 223 | 329 | 486 | 1.38% | 1.67% | 2.29% |
| Native Hawaiian or Pacific Islander alone (NH) | 4 | 7 | 6 | 0.02% | 0.04% | 0.03% |
| Other race alone (NH) | 8 | 10 | 66 | 0.05% | 0.05% | 0.31% |
| Mixed race or Multiracial (NH) | 205 | 284 | 904 | 1.27% | 1.44% | 4.25% |
| Hispanic or Latino (any race) | 544 | 1,332 | 1,970 | 3.37% | 6.75% | 9.27% |
| Total | 16,136 | 19,719 | 21,250 | 100.00% | 100.00% | 100.00% |

=== 2020 census ===
As of the 2020 census, Pleasant Prairie had a population of 21,250. The median age was 44.5 years. 20.4% of residents were under the age of 18 and 17.6% were 65 years of age or older. For every 100 females there were 96.8 males, and for every 100 females age 18 and over there were 94.3 males age 18 and over.

95.1% of residents lived in urban areas, while 4.9% lived in rural areas.

There were 8,509 households in Pleasant Prairie, of which 28.2% had children under the age of 18 living in them. Of all households, 55.3% were married-couple households, 15.1% were households with a male householder and no spouse or partner present, and 22.8% were households with a female householder and no spouse or partner present. About 25.9% of all households were made up of individuals and 11.5% had someone living alone who was 65 years of age or older.

There were 9,000 housing units, of which 5.5% were vacant. The homeowner vacancy rate was 1.0% and the rental vacancy rate was 8.1%.

=== 2010 census ===
As of the census of 2010, there were 19,719 people, 7,272 households, and 5,372 families living in the village. The population density was 591.6 inhabitants per square mile (228.4/km^{2}). There were 7,753 housing units at an average density of 232.6 per square mile (89.8/km^{2}). The racial makeup of the village was 91.1% White, 2.5% African American, 0.4% Native American, 1.7% Asian, 0.1% Pacific Islander, 2.4% from other races, and 1.9% from two or more races. Hispanic or Latino people of any race were 6.8% of the population.

There were 7,272 households, of which 35.8% had children under the age of 18 living with them, 62.0% were married couples living together, 7.9% had a female householder with no husband present, 4.0% had a male householder with no wife present, and 26.1% were non-families. 21.3% of all households were made up of individuals, and 8.8% had someone living alone who was 65 years of age or older. The average household size was 2.68 and the average family size was 3.14.

The median age in the village was 41.3 years. 25.5% of residents were under the age of 18; 6.8% were between the ages of 18 and 24; 24.3% were from 25 to 44; 30.6% were from 45 to 64; and 12.8% were 65 years of age or older. The gender makeup of the village was 49.1% male and 50.9% female.

=== 2000 census ===
As of the census of 2000, there were 16,136 people, 5,819 households, and 4,393 families living in the village. The population density was 482.3 inhabitants per square mile (186.2/km^{2}). There were 6,050 housing units at an average density of 180.9 per square mile (69.8/km^{2}). The racial makeup of the village was 94.08% White, 1.45% African American, 0.39% Native American, 1.38% Asian, 0.02% Pacific Islander, 1.03% from other races, and 1.64% from two or more races. Hispanic or Latino people of any race were 3.37% of the population.

There were 5,819 households, out of which 37.0% had children under the age of 18 living with them, 65.0% were married couples living together, 6.7% had a female householder with no husband present, and 24.5% were non-families. 19.0% of all households were made up of individuals, and 7.6% had someone living alone who was 65 years of age or older. The average household size was 2.73 and the average family size was 3.15.

In the village, the population was spread out, with 27.2% under the age of 18, 6.6% from 18 to 24, 31.3% from 25 to 44, 24.2% from 45 to 64, and 10.6% who were 65 years of age or older. The median age was 37 years. For every 100 females, there were 98.6 males. For every 100 females age 18 and over, there were 96.7 males.

The median income for a household in the village was $62,856, and the median income for a family was $71,452. Males had a median income of $50,477 versus $30,293 for females. The per capita income for the village was $26,087. About 3.0% of families and 3.2% of the population were below the poverty line, including 2.6% of those under age 18 and 5.1% of those age 65 or over.

== Economy ==
LakeView Corporate Park is a 2,400-acre mixed-use development that houses manufacturing, distribution, office, and service operations in a park-like setting east of I-94. Among the tenants is Jelly Belly, which offered tours of its distribution facility until August 2020.

The village has opened a newer 440-acre development called Prairie Highlands Corporate Park just west of I-94. Among the tenants are Haribo, makers of gummy bears, and Nexus Pharmaceuticals.

Pleasant Prairie Premium Outlets was opened in 1988. The mall is a large, outdoor shopping center just east of I-94 at the Highway 165 exit, and often lures shoppers from the Chicago area. It has over 90 stores, many of which are factory outlets for major national brands.

The Village of Pleasant Prairie has no downtown. Early in 2019, the village enlisted a large group of residents to generate ideas for a downtown on 180 acres near the Village municipal building. Residents highlighted the need for relatively dense residential housing, a public market, restaurants and other civic amenities, all while maintaining green spaces and respecting the village's prairie identity.

In October 2019, the village signed a contract with Rinka, a Milwaukee-based architectural design firm, to develop a master plan for the downtown based on those principles. A draft of the plan was presented to the public in June 2020.

== Parks and recreation ==
One of the best-known features of Pleasant Prairie is the RecPlex. Covering over 300,000 square feet, it is the largest municipal recreational facility in the United States. The complex of buildings includes a 50-meter pool, water park, fitness center, field house, suspended track, and two NHL-sized ice rinks. The RecPlex is located in Prairie Springs Park and is adjacent to Lake Andrea. The 121-acre lake provides visitors with access to a beach, as well as opportunities to swim, boat, and fish.

The Chiwaukee Prairie State Natural Area is one of the largest prairie complexes in Wisconsin. It is an assemblage of 485 acres of coastal wetlands and sand dunes that stretch along Lake Michigan from the Illinois state line to the Kenosha Sand Dunes on its northern boundary. Embedded within these natural areas is the residential neighborhood of Carol Beach. Chiwaukee Prairie is home to many species of plants and animals, some of which are endangered. In 2015, Chiwaukee was designated as a Ramsar wetland of international significance.

Included in the LakeView development is a 425-acre nature conservancy along the Des Plaines River floodplain.

== Education ==
Pleasant Prairie is part of the Kenosha Unified School District.

== Notable people ==
- Walter L. Dexter, farmer and Wisconsin State Representative, born in the town of Pleasant Prairie, served as Pleasant Prairie Town Board chairman
- Mark Jensen, convicted murderer of his wife Julie Jensen
- Joyce Hill Westerman, player in the All-American Girls Professional Baseball League, was born and raised in Pleasant Prairie, on the Clausen-Hill farm.
