= List of Ramsar sites in the United States =

This list of Ramsar sites in the United States are those wetlands that are considered to be of international importance, protected under the Ramsar Convention treaty. The United States as of 2020, has 41 sites designated as "Wetlands of International Importance" with a surface area of 1,884,551 hectares (7,276.29 mi^{2}; 18,845.51 km^{2}). For a full list of all Ramsar sites worldwide, see List of Ramsar wetlands of international importance.

== List of Ramsar sites ==
Name	Location	Area	Designated	Description	Image
Ash Meadows National Wildlife Refuge	Nevada; 36°25′N 116°20′W	36.71 mi^{2}	18 December 1986		
Bolinas Lagoon	California; 37°55′N 122°41′W	1.72 mi^{2}	1 September 1998	A tidal estuary located on the Pacific Flyway, the lagoon provides habitat for migratory birds as well as ducks, geese, and shorebirds.	
Cache-Lower White Rivers	Arkansas; 34°40′N 91°11′W	314.19 mi^{2}	21 November 1989		
Cache River-Cypress Creek Wetlands	Illinois; 37°13′N 89°8′W	93.75 mi^{2}	1 November 1994		
Caddo Lake	Texas, Louisiana; 32°45′N 94°8′W	30.80 mi^{2}	23 October 1993		
Catahoula Lake	Louisiana; 31°30′N 92°6′W	46.9 mi^{2}	18 June 1991		
Chesapeake Bay Estuarine Complex	Maryland, Virginia; 38°0′N 76°20′W	170 mi^{2}	4 June 1987		
Cheyenne Bottoms	Kansas; 38°29′N 98°40′W	42.39 mi^{2}	19 October 1988		
Chiwaukee Illinois Beach Lake Plain	Illinois; Wisconsin; 42°25′02″N 87°48′42″W	6.12 mi^{2}	6 October 2015	Bi-state, lake-coast lands, including Chiwaukee Prairie and Illinois Beach State Park	
Congaree National Park	South Carolina; 33°47′22″N 80°45′34″W	40.69 mi^{2}	2 February 2012		
Connecticut River Estuary and Tidal Wetlands Complex	Connecticut; 41°15′N 72°18′W	25.03 mi^{2}	14 October 1994		
Corkscrew Swamp Sanctuary	Florida; 26°24′N 81°31′W	20.31 mi^{2}	23 March 2009		
Delaware Bay Estuary	Delaware, New Jersey; 39°11′N 75°14′W	197.89 mi^{2}	20 May 1992		
Door Peninsula Coastal Wetlands	Wisconsin; 45°13′20″N 85°00′00″W	17.880 mi^{2}	6 October 2014		
Edwin B. Forsythe National Wildlife Refuge	New Jersey; 39°36′N 74°17′W	50.5 mi^{2}	18 December 1986		
Elkhorn Slough	California; 36.8259°N 121.7569°W	2.80 mi^{2}	25 June 2018		
Everglades National Park	Florida; 25°33′N 80°55′W	2,357.14 mi^{2}	4 June 1987		
Francis Beidler Forest	South Carolina; 33°15′N 80°22′W	24.86 mi^{2}	30 May 2008		
Grassland Ecological Area	California; 37°10′N 120°50′W	250 mi^{2}	2 February 2005		
Horicon Marsh	Wisconsin; 43°30′N 88°38′W	49.85 mi^{2}	4 December 1990		
Humbug Marsh	Michigan; 42°6′N 83°11′W	0.73 mi^{2}	20 January 2010		
Izembek Lagoon National Wildlife Refuge	Alaska; 55°45′N 162°41′W	650.32 mi^{2}	18 December 1986		
Kakagon and Bad River Sloughs	Wisconsin; 46°39′N 90°41′W	16.81 mi^{2}	2 February 2012		
Kawainui and Hamakua Marsh Complex	Hawaii; 21°24′N 157°45′W	1.60 mi^{2}	2 February 2005		
Laguna de Santa Rosa Wetland Complex	California; 38°24′N 122°47′W	6.08 mi^{2}	16 April 2010		
Lower Wisconsin Riverway	Wisconsin; 43°09′N 90°21′W	68 mi^{2}	14 February 2020		
Niagara River Corridor	New York; 43°5′N 79°4′W	20.261 mi^{2}	3 October 2019		
Okefenokee National Wildlife Refuge	Georgia, Florida; 30°48′N 82°20′W	627.94 mi^{2}	18 December 1986		
Palmyra Atoll National Wildlife Refuge	Line Islands; 5°52′N 162°6′W	788.14 mi^{2}	1 April 2011		
Pelican Island National Wildlife Refuge	Florida; 27°48′N 80°25′W	7.37 mi^{2}	14 March 1993		
Quivira National Wildlife Refuge	Kansas; 38°5′N 98°29′W	34.59 mi^{2}	12 February 2002	The refuge has 34 wetlands and includes two shallow lakes, Big Salt Marsh and Little Salt Marsh. More than half of the refuge is Tallgrass and Shortgrass prairies.	
Roswell Artesian Wetlands	New Mexico; 33°27′N 104°23′W	3.54 mi^{2}	7 September 2010		
San Francisco Bay and Estuary	California; 37°52′N 122°23′W	612.79 mi^{2}	2 February 2013		
Sand Lake National Wildlife Refuge	South Dakota; 45°45′N 98°15′W	34 mi^{2}	3 August 1998		
Sue and Wes Dixon Waterfowl Refuge at Hennepin and Hopper Lake	Illinois; 41°13′20″N 89°20′17″W	4.31 mi^{2}	2 February 2012		
The Emiquon Complex	Illinois; 40°21′22″N 90°3′10″W	22.12 mi^{2}	2 February 2012		
Tijuana River National Estuarine Research Reserve	California; 32°33′N 117°7′W	3.94 mi^{2}	2 February 2005		
Tomales Bay	California; 38°9′N 123°23′W	28.5 km^{2} (11.0 mi^{2})	30 September 2002		
Upper Mississippi River Floodplain Wetlands	Minnesota, Wisconsin, Iowa, Illinois; 43°3′N 91°10′W	472.42 mi^{2}	5 January 2010		
Wilma H. Schiermeier Olentangy River Wetland Research Park	Ohio; 40°1′N 83°1′W	0.081 mi^{2}	18 April 2008		

== See also ==
- Ramsar Convention
- List of Ramsar sites worldwide
