= Illinois State Parks =

State park system of Illinois, United States

The Illinois State Parks is the state park system of the U.S. state of Illinois, administered by the Illinois Department of Natural Resources (IDNR). As of 2026, the Illinois State Parks Designation Act (20 ILCS 840) listed 63 legally designated state parks.

The state parks encompass portions of the Lake Michigan shoreline, river bluffs and canyons in northern and western Illinois, central Illinois prairies and streams, and the forests, wetlands and sandstone formations of southern Illinois. They provide facilities for activities including hiking, camping, boating, fishing, hunting, picnicking, and wildlife observation. IDNR does not charge a general entrance fee for state-owned or state-operated land, although fees apply to camping and to beach use at some sites.

In fiscal year 2024, properties classified by IDNR as state parks contained 122,541.887 acres (49,590.942 ha) of state-owned land and water and 3,350.400 acres (1,355.859 ha) of leased property. The department recorded 27,222,436 visits to those properties during the 2024 fiscal year.

== History ==
=== Early parks ===
Illinois acquired 24 acres (9.7 ha) surrounding the site of Fort Massac in 1903, following a preservation campaign led by the Daughters of the American Revolution. The property was officially dedicated on November 5, 1908, as Fort Massac State Park, the first state park in Illinois. The choice reflected the early state park system's emphasis on preserving places associated with Illinois history.

Starved Rock State Park was established in 1911 as the state's second park. By 1917, the state park system contained approximately 416 acres (168 ha). Responsibility for the developing system was placed within the state government's public-works organization before the creation of a specialized conservation agency.

The Illinois Department of Conservation was established in 1925 and brought the state's parks and several other natural-resource functions under a single department. Acquisitions of White Pines Forest State Park, Giant City State Park, and what was then Black Hawk State Park in 1927 broadened the system beyond sites chosen principally for their historical associations. By 1929, the Illinois state park system covered approximately 2,783 acres (1,126 ha).

A 1931 change in state law formally authorized historical, scenic, and recreational types of parks. Eight recreational parks were acquired between 1934 and 1939, including Fox Ridge and Kankakee River state parks and former mined land that later became Kickapoo State Recreation Area.

=== 1930s development ===
The Civilian Conservation Corps (CCC) undertook extensive construction and landscape work in Illinois parks during the 1930s. CCC projects included roads, bridges, trails, shelters, campgrounds, water systems and erosion-control structures. Long-term projects were carried out at White Pines, Pere Marquette, Starved Rock, and Giant City, among other properties.

The Civilian Conservation Corps workers contributed to the construction of lodges and cabins at White Pines, Pere Marquette State Park, Starved Rock and Giant City. Many surviving buildings were constructed with locally available stone and timber and later became recognized as examples of the National Park Service rustic architectural style. The combined acreage of Illinois state parks and monuments increased from approximately 2,800 acres (1,100 ha) in 1930 to 16,500 acres (6,700 ha) in 1940.

=== 1995 creation of IDNR ===
The park system continued to expand during the mid- and late 20th century through state purchases, donations, leases, and cooperative projects involving federal reservoirs and other public land. In 1995, the Illinois Department of Conservation was reorganized as the Illinois Department of Natural Resources (IDNR). The new department also incorporated natural-resource programs transferred from several other state agencies. IDNR assumed responsibility for the state parks and the other public lands formerly managed by the former Illinois Department of Conservation.

== Administration ==
The State Parks Act places state parks under the care, control, supervision, and management of IDNR. Day-to-day management is primarily carried out through the department's land-management program. Other IDNR programs participate in wildlife management, natural-area protection, law enforcement, cultural-resource preservation, land acquisition, engineering, and environmental planning.

Under the State Parks Designation Act, a state park is expected to possess scenic or natural features and terrain of statewide significance and to offer a range of recreational opportunities. Its intended uses combine the protection of plant and animal communities and cultural and historic resources with public recreation.

Public use of state parks and other IDNR properties is regulated under Part 110 of Title 17 of the Illinois Administrative Code. The rules address matters including operating hours, camping, vehicles, pets, fires, alcohol, commercial activities, special events, and the protection of natural and cultural resources. Individual parks may also have site-specific restrictions reflecting their habitats, facilities, and permitted activities.

== Features ==
=== Landscapes ===
Illinois state parks represent several of the state's major geographical regions. In northeastern Illinois, the Illinois Beach State Park extends for approximately 6.5 mi (10.5 km) along Lake Michigan. It preserves the state's remaining beach-ridge shoreline, including dunes, swales, marshes and black-oak woodland.

Northern and western parks include the sandstone canyons of Starved Rock, the bluffs of Mississippi Palisades State Park and the deeply cut terrain of Apple River Canyon State Park. Starved Rock contains 18 canyons eroded into St. Peter Sandstone and more than 13 mi (21 km) of trails.

Parks in central Illinois preserve reservoirs, river corridors, woodland, and remnants of the prairie landscape. Southern Illinois parks include upland hardwood forest, cypress–tupelo swamp and sandstone formations associated with the Shawnee Hills. Giant City, Ferne Clyffe State Park, Dixon Springs State Park, and Cave-in-Rock State Park are among the parks representing this region.

Some state park property is additionally protected under the Illinois Nature Preserves System or as a state land and water reserve. Such dedications can impose conservation requirements beyond the general state park designation. The south unit of Illinois Beach, for example, was dedicated in 1964 as the first Illinois nature preserve.

=== Recreation activities ===
Recreation varies by location and may include hiking, bicycling, horseback riding, camping, fishing, boating, paddling, hunting, swimming, cross-country skiing, and wildlife observation. Water-oriented parks include Illinois Beach and Chain O'Lakes State Park, while parks such as Starved Rock, Giant City, and Ferne Clyffe are known primarily for hiking and geological scenery. Hunting and motorized recreation are limited to sites or areas where they are specifically authorized.

Camping is available at many parks and ranges from primitive campsites to sites with electricity, sanitary facilities and showers. Cabins, group camps, picnic shelters and other facilities may be reserved through IDNR's reservation system. Camping is generally offered throughout the year when weather and utility conditions permit.

Several parks contain lodges or cabin complexes, including Starved Rock, Pere Marquette, Giant City, White Pines and Illinois Beach. Some lodging, food service, boat rental and retail facilities are operated by private concessionaires under agreements with IDNR. Although entry to state-owned or state-operated land is generally free, visitors pay fees for camping, lodging, reservations, and certain concessions. Sites with managed swimming beaches may charge a separate beach-use fee.

== See also ==
- List of protected areas of Illinois
- Illinois State Park Lodges and Cabins Thematic Resources
- Illinois Nature Preserves Commission
- Illinois Department of Natural Resources
