= Illinois Beach State Park =

Park on Lake Michigan in Illinois

- IUCN category III (natural monument or feature)
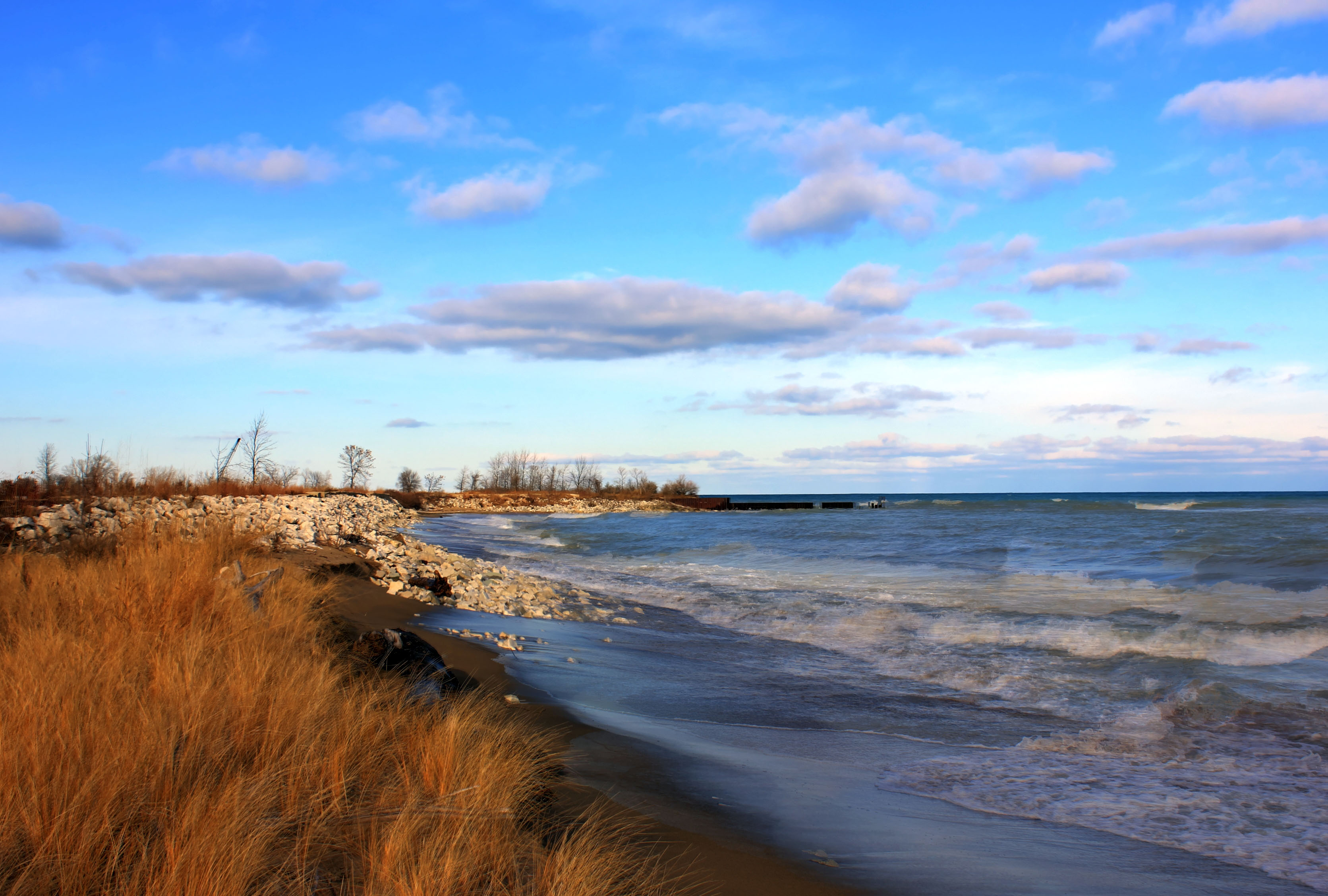

- Location within Illinois
- Location: Lake County, Illinois, United States
- Nearest city: Zion, Illinois
- Coordinates: 42°25′02″N 87°48′42″W
- Area: 4,160 acres (1,683 ha)
- Established: 1948
- Visitors: 1.2 million (in 2015)
- Governing body: Illinois Department of Natural Resources

U.S. National Natural Landmark
- Designated: 1980

Ramsar Wetland
- Official name: Chiwaukee Illinois Beach Lake Plain
- Designated: 25 September 2015
- Reference no.: 2243

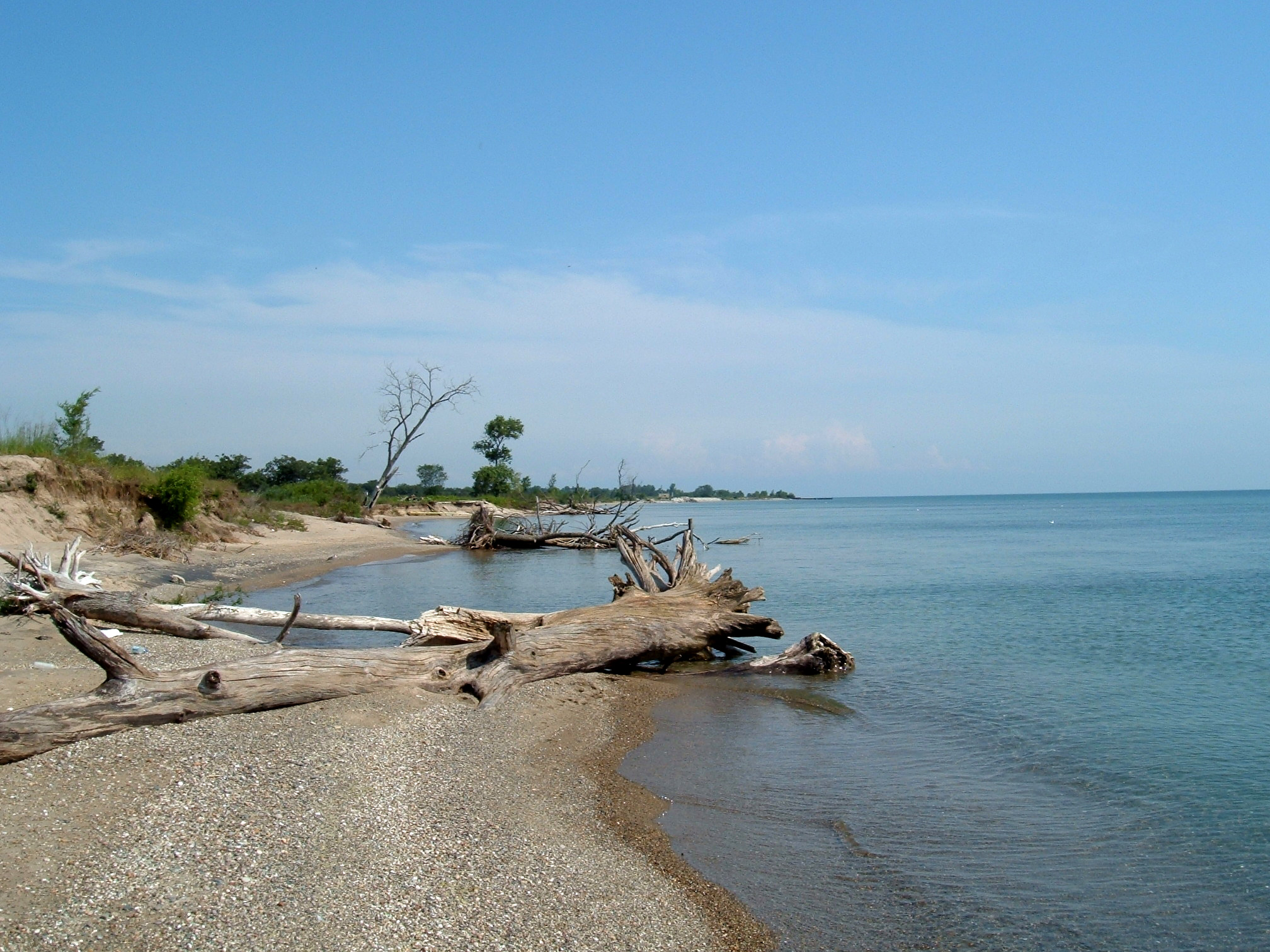
Shoreline along the Northern Unit

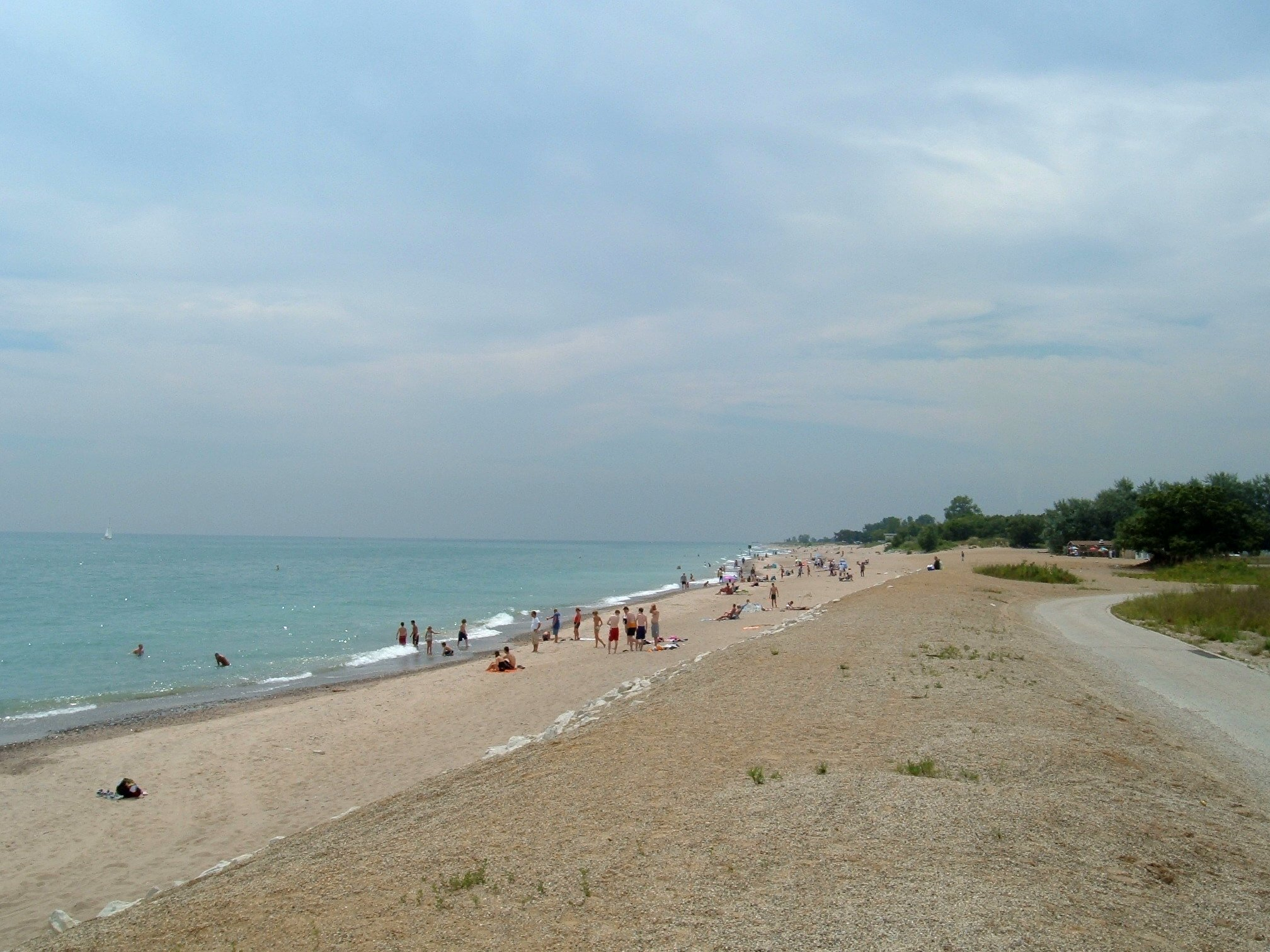
Main public beach in the Southern Unit

The Illinois Beach State Park (officially the Adeline Jay Geo-Karis Illinois Beach State Park) is a state park of Illinois, located along Lake Michigan in northern Lake County in northeast Illinois. Together with lands to the north, including Chiwaukee Prairie, it forms most of the Chiwaukee Prairie Illinois Beach Lake Plain, an internationally recognized wetland of importance under the Ramsar Convention. The park is broken into two units that encompass an area of 4,160 acres (1,683 ha) and contains over six miles of Lake Michigan shoreline. In 2010, it was renamed for former state senator Adeline Geo-Karis. Recreational activities at the park include boating, swimming, hiking, bicycling, camping, bird watching, and picnicking. Known primarily for the beach, the park also includes hiking trails of dune areas, wetlands, prairie, and black oak savanna. Two areas at the northern and southern ends of the park are designated Illinois Nature Preserves, the latter of which was named a National Natural Landmark in 1980.

== History ==
The park was gradually created starting in 1948 when the state acquired the first parcels. The northern unit, acquired between 1971 and 1982, was previously an Illinois National Guard training facility known as Camp Logan, Illinois. During the American Civil War, Camp Logan was a Union prisoner of war camp.

In 1958, the Illinois Beach Hotel was opened within the park.

== Geology ==
The park is located in the 12 mile long Zion Beach Ridge Plain. The Zion Beach Ridge Plain is 3,700 years old and composed of curvilinear ridge-and-swale topography. The beach ridges support black oak savanna habitat, while wetlands dominate the swales. The Zion Beach Ridge Plain has been migrating south throughout the late Holocene: the northern portion of the beach ridge erodes; freed sediment is then transported through the dominantly southward littoral drift and deposited on the southern portion of the beach ridge. This erosion and subsequent accretion process created the characteristically curved ridges and swales of the park as the complex migrates south. To prevent erosion, rubble ridges were erected along the shoreline which also formed habitats for aquatic species. The northern unit of Illinois Beach State Park experiences rapid rates of erosion, which was exacerbated by the construction of North Point Marina in 1989 and reaches highs of 60 ft per year. The southward migration of the beach ridge plain has been disrupted by the construction of Waukegan Harbor. Erosion in the north unit of the park is exacerbated during periods of high lake level. As Lake Michigan has entered a period near record high lake levels since 2014, the park is experiencing rapid transgression of the shoreline. As of 2024, 22 breakwaters have been installed to help prevent the erosion of the coastline. The coastline has built back up slowly through this installment.

== Access ==
The entry to the beach is usually from a parking area on its north side: north of this lot is usually the most crowded area in the summer time. South, the beach is less crowded and a mile of shoreline extends to an inlet into a wetland. Depending on weather conditions this inlet may be blocked by a berm from the lake waters, and again depending on weather conditions the water inside the berm may be significantly warmer than Lake Michigan which is rather cold until August.

The beach also contains ADA accessible ramps, paths, restrooms and picnicking.

== Gallery ==
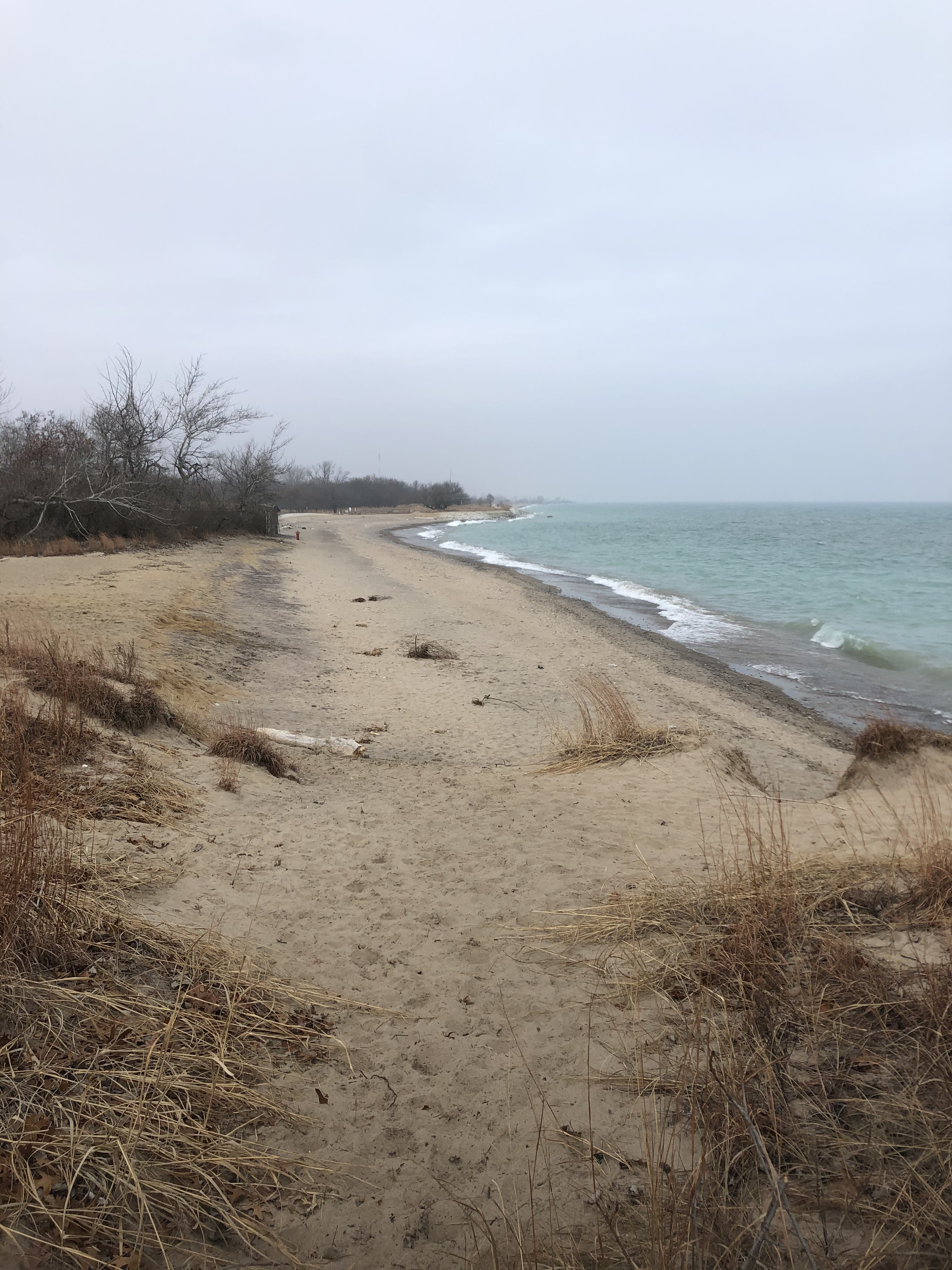
North view of public beach section

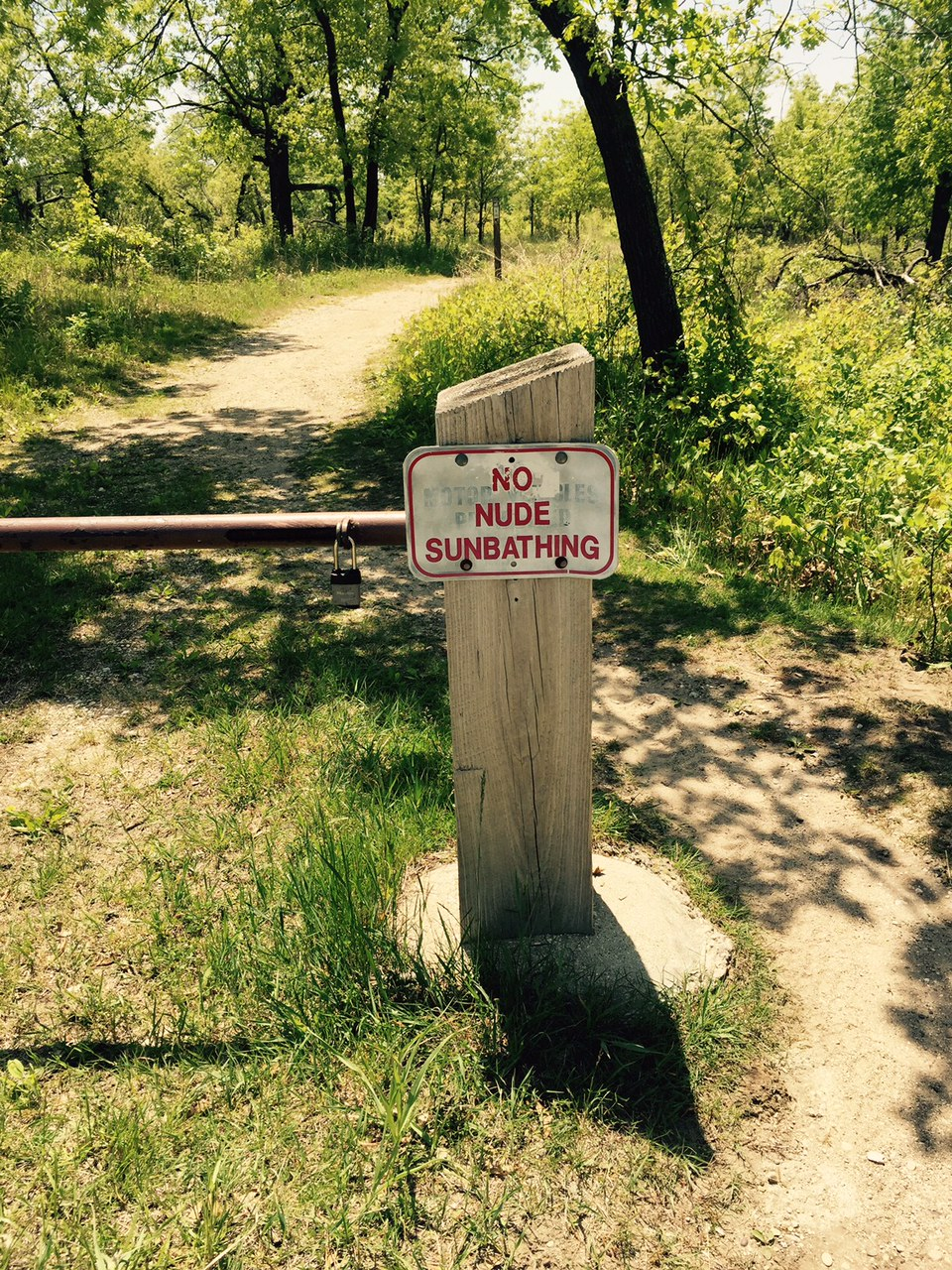
Sign at the start of the beach trail

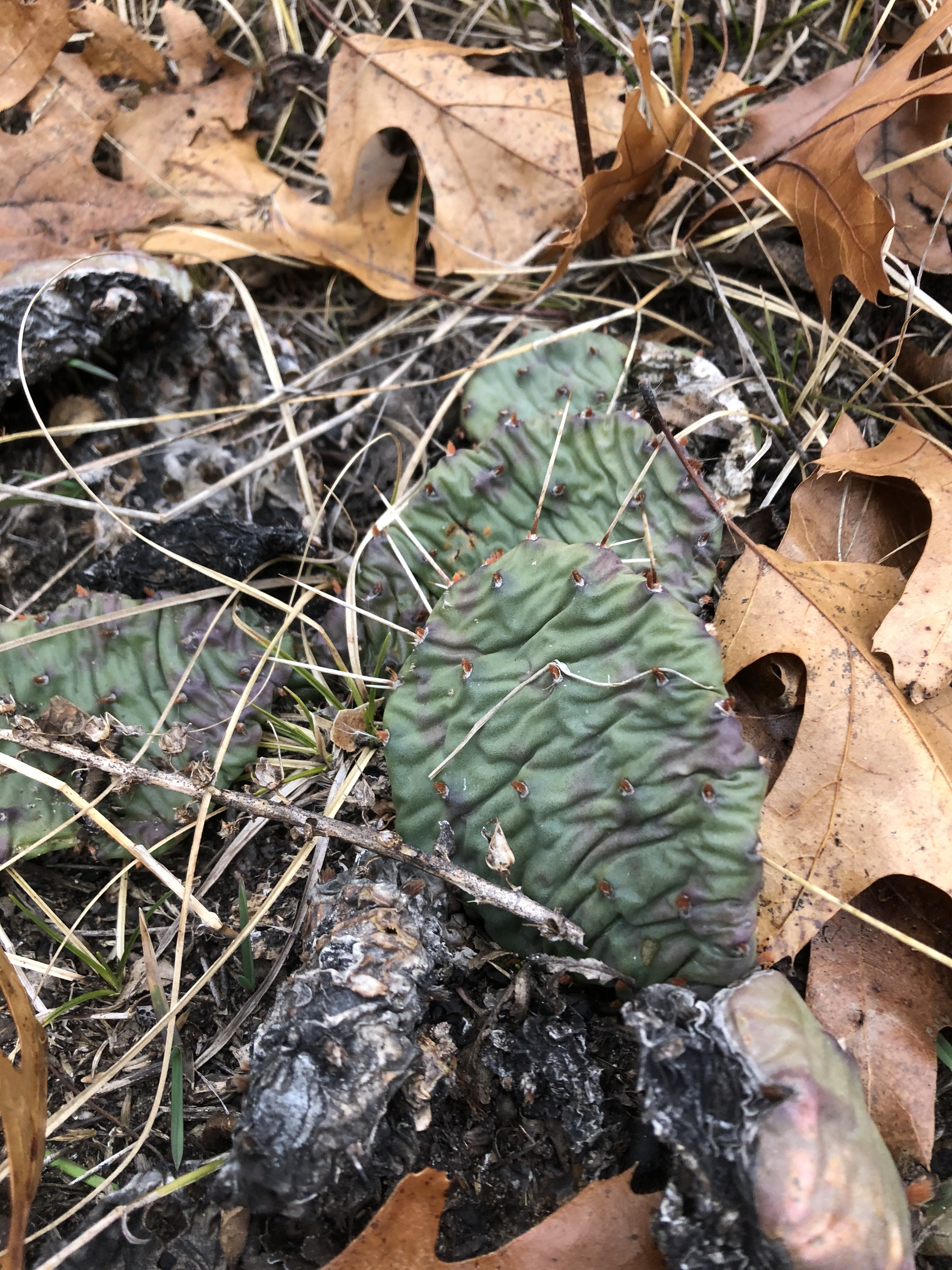
Prickly pear cactus in the dunes of the southern beach, winter 2019

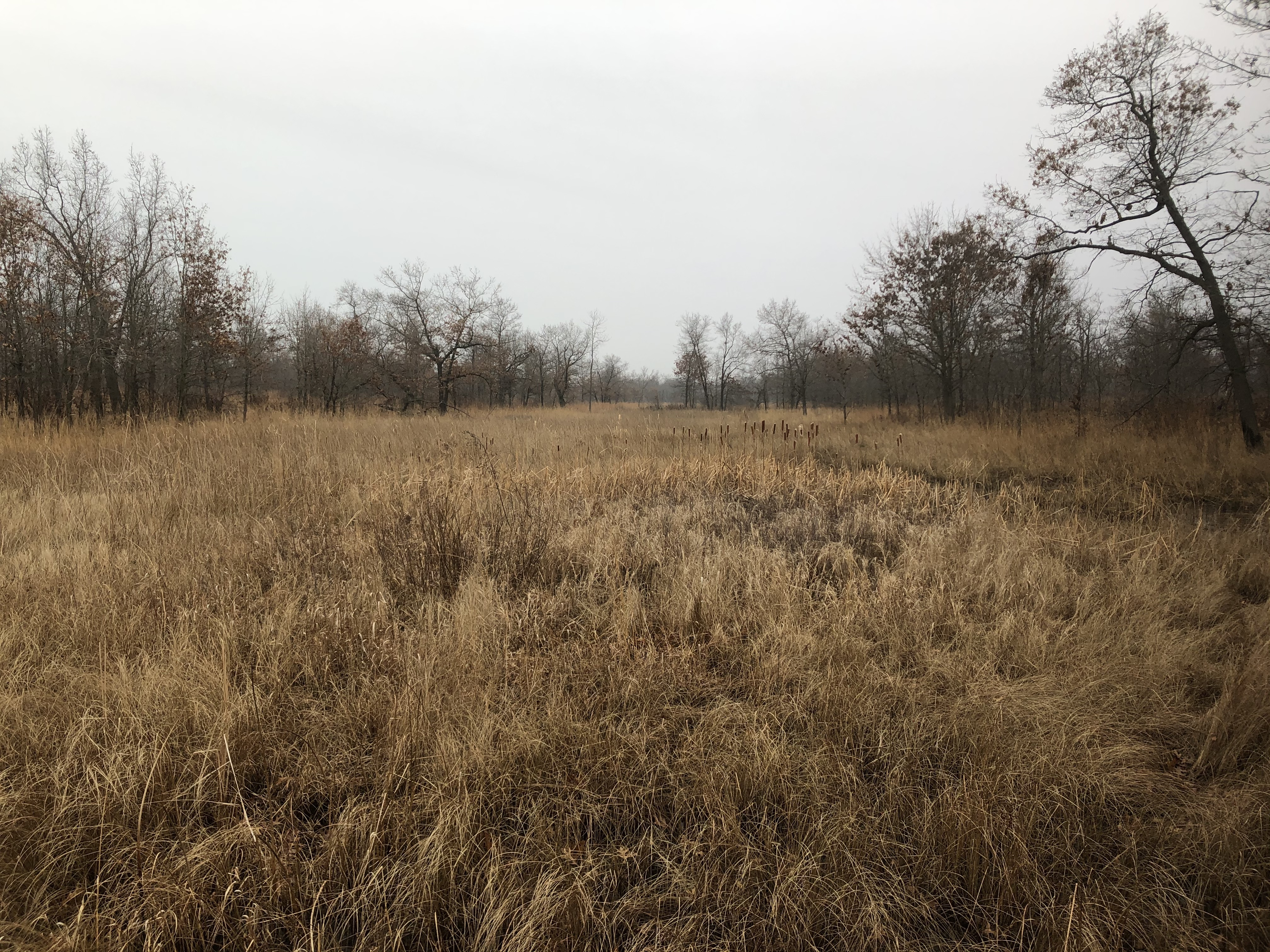
Wetlands in winter near Dead River

== See also ==
- List of Ramsar sites in the United States
