= USS Kenosha =

USS Kenosha may refer to:

- USS Kenosha (1867), was a wooden-hulled screw sloop-of-war laid down in 1867 and renamed Plymouth 15 May 1869
- USS Kenosha (AK-190), was an Alamosa-class cargo ship acquired by the US Navy on 1 August 1945 and decommissioned 16 April 1946
