= Barnes Creek (Wisconsin) =

Coordinates: 42°31′23″N 87°48′41″W

Barnes Creek is a navigable stream located in the village of Pleasant Prairie in southeastern Kenosha County, Wisconsin, United States. It flows near Wisconsin Highway 165 and crosses beneath Wisconsin Highway 32 (Sheridan Road) which flows eastward through Carol Beach into Lake Michigan. The stream's length is 3.7 miles (6.0 km).

== Barnes Creek Site ==
- Barnes Creek Site
- U.S. National Register of Historic Places
- Location within Wisconsin Location within the United States
- Nearest city: Kenosha, Wisconsin
- Area: 6 acres (2.4 ha)
- Built: 0200
- NRHP reference No.: 77000032
- Added to NRHP: July 20, 1977

The Barnes Creek area is of high archaeological interest and is listed on the National Register of Historic Places as the location of prehistoric American Indian settlements dating to the mid-Woodland periods of 200 to 1400 AD.
