= RecPlex =

Recreational facility in Wisconsin

Coordinates: 42.52902°N 87.91656°W

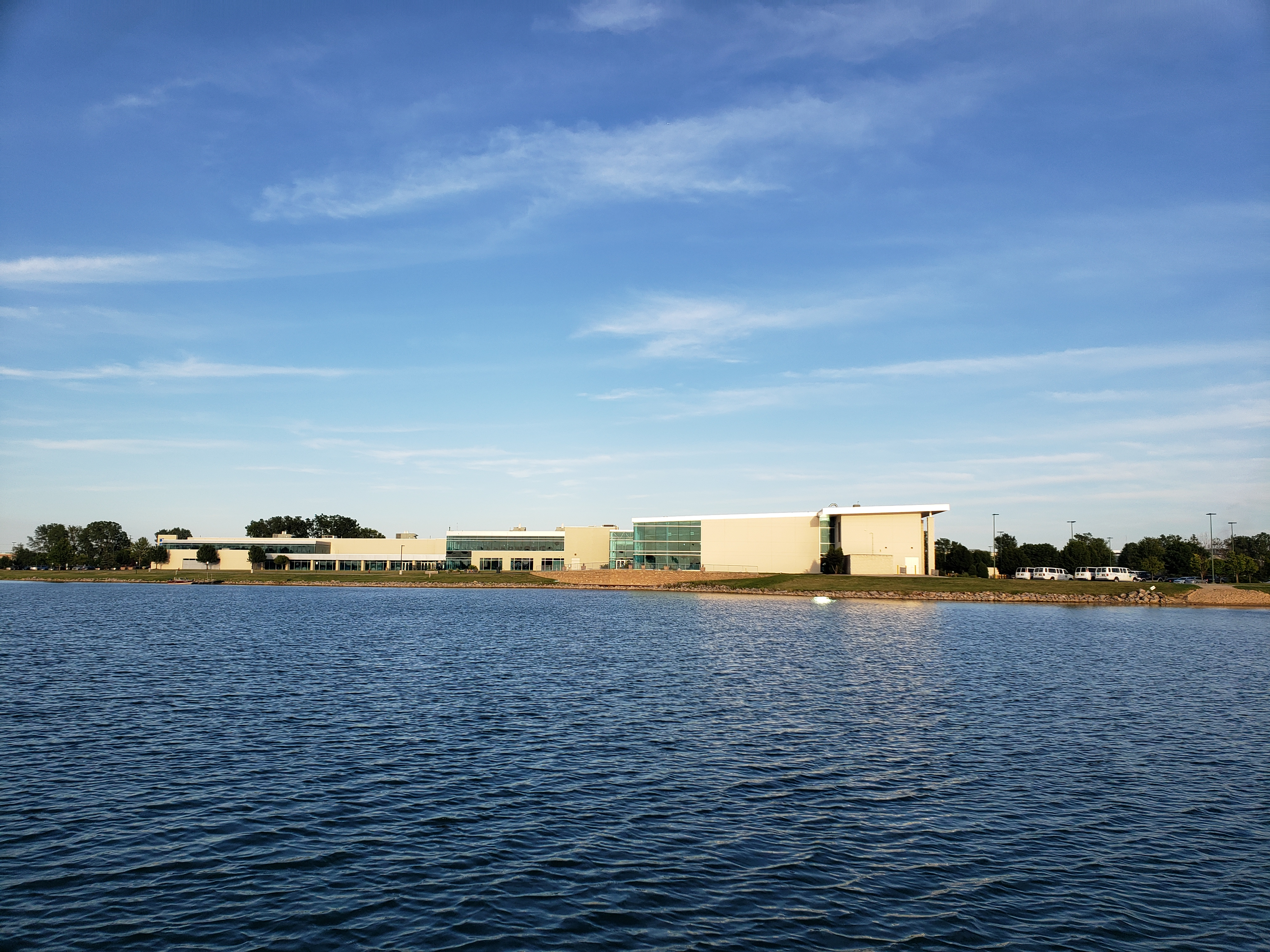
RecPlex from North Side Lake Andrea

The Pleasant Prairie RecPlex is a recreational facility in Kenosha County, Wisconsin. "The Largest Municipal Recreational Facility in America", it consists of 302,000 square feet in Prairie Springs Park on the shores of Lake Andrea.

== History ==
Planning for the RecPlex began in 1998. WisPark donated $4 million for its construction, after previously providing $1.6 million to construct Prairie Springs Park. Construction began with a groundbreaking ceremony on October 12, 1999, and the RecPlex opened almost a year later, on October 1, 2000. The facility included a 17,000 square foot leisure pool, a 60,000 square foot field house, an 8,000 square foot fitness center, a 1/6-mile suspended track, changing rooms, a child-care area and a snack bar.

On January 12, 2004, construction began for an addition to the RecPlex. A new, larger fitness center, more changing rooms, an expanded child-care area, racquetball courts, a multi-purpose studio, and party rooms were all added. In total, the facility's area increased by 42,000 square feet. Separately, a 79,000 square foot ice arena, with two NHL-sized ice rinks and additional amenities, was also constructed.

In late 2008, a second major expansion was announced. An Olympic-sized swimming pool would be built, with $8 million in funding from Uline, which was in the process of moving from Waukegan, Illinois to Pleasant Prairie. The Village broke ground for the pool on June 22, 2009, and completed it almost a year later, on June 10, 2010. The 42,000 square foot expansion also included related amenities, as well as seating for approximately 600 spectators. Water and air in the pool is heated and cooled with geothermal technology placed in the adjacent Lake Andrea. Ultraviolet technology, similar to that installed in the original aquatic center, is used to treat the water.
