= Chiwaukee Prairie =

Prairie in Wisconsin, United States

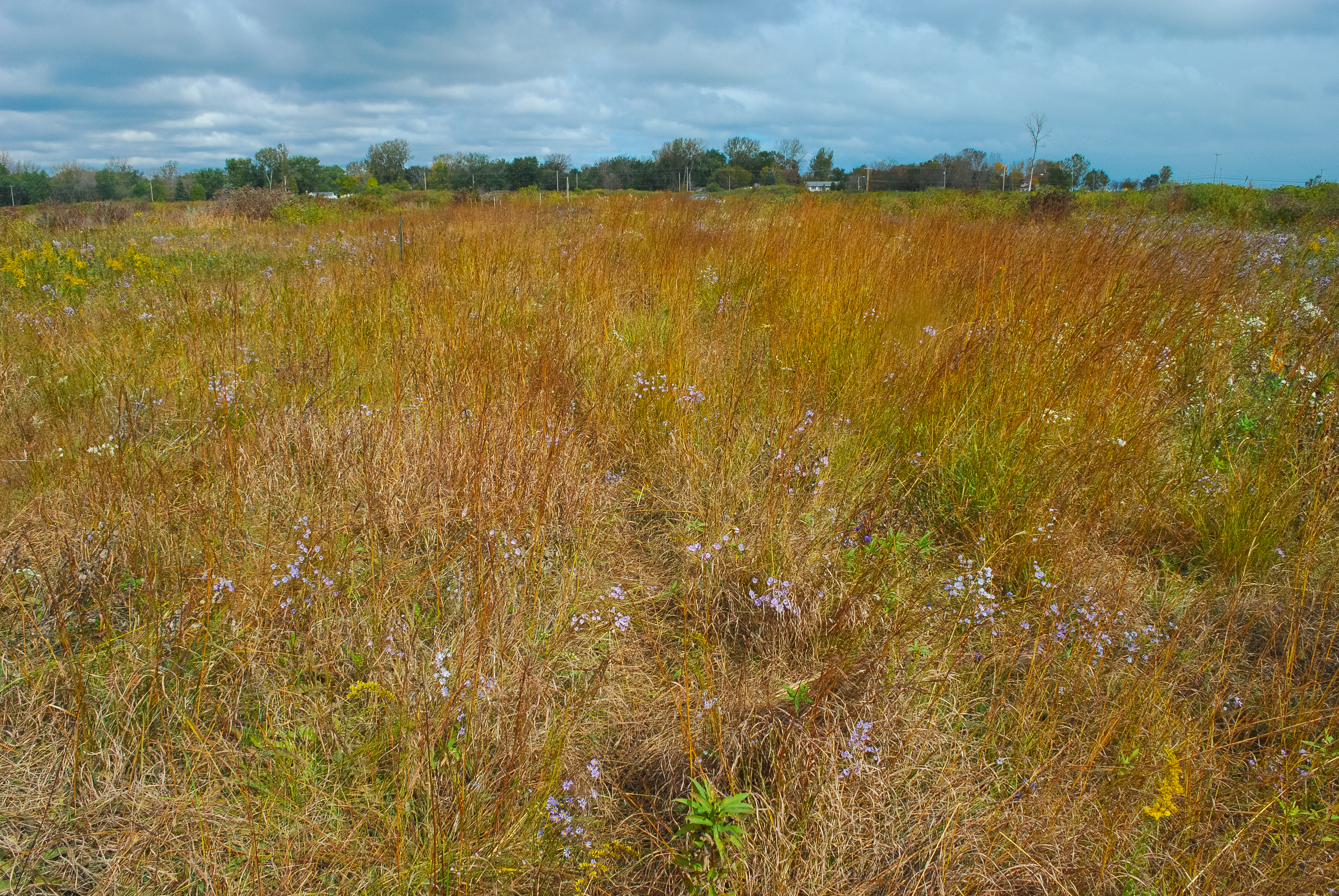
- Chiwaukee Prairie, October 2010

- Location within Wisconsin
- Location: Kenosha County, Wisconsin
- Coordinates: 42.5208°N 87.8185°W
- Area: 485 acres (196 ha)

U.S. National Natural Landmark
- Designated: 1973

Ramsar Wetland
- Official name: Chiwaukee Illinois Beach Lake Plain
- Designated: 25 September 2015
- Reference no.: 2243

Chiwaukee Prairie is a 485-acre (1.96 km^{2}) prairie in Pleasant Prairie, Wisconsin managed by the Wisconsin Department of Natural Resources (about midway between Chicago and Milwaukee). It is located on Lake Michigan at the Illinois state line and includes grassy wetlands, wooded areas, and the Kenosha Sand Dunes at its northern tip. It is home to an abundance of wildlife. It was designated a Wisconsin State Natural Area in 1967 and a National Natural Landmark in 1973.

Together with surrounding areas, and south to Illinois Beach State Park, the prairie is part of an internationally recognized wetland of importance under the Ramsar Convention, called the Chiwaukee Illinois Beach Lake Plain.

== History ==
The Chiwaukee Prairie was formed at the end of the Last Glacial Period, over 10,000 years ago. As lake water receded from the older Toleston Shoreline, wind and wave action accumulated sand along the current Lake Michigan shoreline. This sediment was stabilized by sand-binding grasses. The decaying plant material contributed humus which supported shrubs and native wildflowers. Eventually, larger trees such as oaks, birch and cottonwood took root. Today, the prairie appears as a series of sandy ridges, wet swales and woodland areas. Chiwaukee Prairie and the Illinois Beach to the south are referred to as a Lake Plain.

In 1924, Edith Rockefeller McCormick bought 1800 acres from 80th street south to Tobin Road (116th Street) and west to Sheridan Road. This was to be the site of a model city named Edithton Beach. At about the same time, a second development from 116th Street south to the state line, named Chiwaukee on the Lake, was launched. Surveyors divided the acreage into lots, and a nine-hole golf course was completed. Developers built few large homes along Lake Michigan, but wet soil made building elsewhere difficult. The Great Depression of 1929 brought an end to both developments.

In 1936, the Wisconsin State Planning Commission recommended that the sand dunes and land extending south to the Illinois state line be acquired as a state park. The plan died for lack of funds and sufficient local interest.

In 1947, a group of developers led by Joseph E. Shaffron bought most of the land to build homes for middle-class families. Shaffron named the development Carol Beach, after his daughter. Shaffron built ranch-style houses, but once again drainage problems on many lots made them difficult to develop. Wisconsin Power Company bought another 130 acres of sand dunes just north of Carol Beach for a potential power plant.

In the 1960s, a group of concerned citizens, led by Phil Sander and Al Krampert, organized to save the prairie by acquiring undeveloped tracts of land. The Nature Conservancy supported their efforts. Hundreds of private property owners were tracked down and solicited. Some donated their land. Other properties were purchased as funds became available. In 1967 in Wisconsin deemed Chiwaukee Prairie a State Natural Area. The National Park Service recognized it as a National Natural Landmark in 1973. In 1993, WEC Energy Group donated 62 acres to the Nature Conservancy adding the Kenosha Sand Dunes to Chiwaukee Prairie. Many properties have been deeded to the Wisconsin Department of Natural Resources (WDNR) or the University of Wisconsin-Parkside, and all are managed by the WDNR. In 2015, the entire Lake Plain from Chiwaukee Prairie south was designated a Ramsar wetland of International Significance.

The group of citizens that saved the prairie from development is now constituted as the Chiwaukee Prairie Preservation Fund. They continue to raise money and organize efforts to restore and maintain the land and its wildlife. Since 2014, the Nature Conservancy has acquired another 150 acres just east of Sheridan Road from 116th Street south towards the Illinois border. Dubbed the "Chiwaukee West Restoration Area," the land is being cleared of invasive species and will be seeded with native plant species.

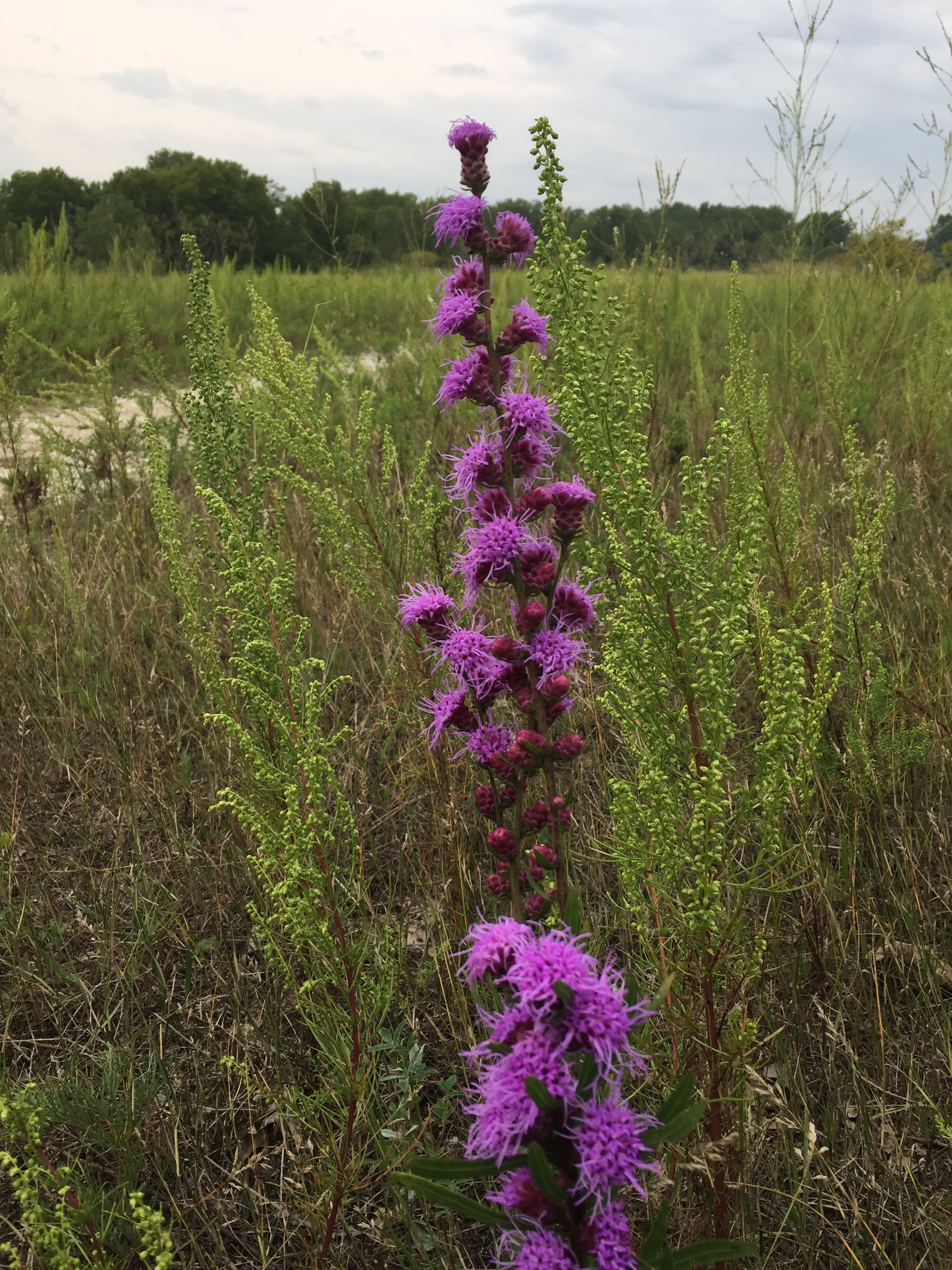

== Flora and fauna ==
The Chiwaukee Prairie is one of the most complete prairie complexes in Wisconsin. It offers a variety of habitats from marshy grasslands, to sand dunes and wooded areas. And it supports a large variety flora and fauna, some of which are rare or endangered.

The prairie has over 400 vascular plant species. There are ferns, lichens, rushes and aquatic plants. There are shrubs such as sumac, red raspberry and an abundance of red-twig dogwood. There are some 80 different kinds of sedges and grasses. And is there is a bewildering assortment of flowers including blazing stars, black-eyed susan, goldenrod, tickseed, milkweed, Queen Anne's-lace, lobelias, asters, thistles, and sunflowers. These bloom at various times throughout the warmer months. In the higher and drier parts of the prairie, there are open woodlands of cottonwood, birch, maples and oaks.

The prairie is home to more than 75 types of birds including gulls, ducks, vireos, swallows, wrens, finches, orioles, woodpeckers, turkey, hawks, kestrels, and bald eagle. Additionally, it is a stop-over site for a succession of migratory birds. The prairie supports an abundance of insects, butterflies, amphibians, and reptiles, including the rare Blanding's turtle (a species of special concern). The prairie is also home to many mammals such as woodchucks, minks, red foxes, coyotes, and the rare Franklin's ground squirrel.
