= USS Kenosha (AK-190) =

Cargo ship of the United States Navy

History

United States
- Name: Kenosha
- Namesake: Kenosha County, Wisconsin
- Ordered: as type (C1-M-AV1) hull, MC hull 2121
- Builder: Walter Butler Shipbuilders, Inc., Superior, Wisconsin
- Yard number: 39
- Laid down: May 1944
- Launched: 25 August 1944
- Sponsored by: Miss Marion Crowley
- Acquired: 1 August 1945
- Commissioned: 7 September 1945
- Decommissioned: 16 April 1946
- Stricken: date unknown
- Identification: Hull symbol: AK-190; Code letters: NENW
- Fate: Sold Norway, 4 March 1947

Norway
- Name: Rio Dale (1947–1958); Torian (1958–1963); Lars Viking (1963–1965); Neptune V (1965–1967); Arabdrill 2 (1967–)
- Acquired: 4 March 1947
- Refit: 1967, converted to an offshore drilling ship
- Identification: IMO number: 5406522
- Fate: Scrapped 24 May 1984

General characteristics
- Class & type: Alamosa-class cargo ship
- Type: C1-M-AV1
- Tonnage: 5,032 long tons deadweight (DWT)
- Displacement: 2,382 long tons (2,420 t) (standard); 7,450 long tons (7,570 t) (full load)
- Length: 388 ft 8 in (118.47 m)
- Beam: 50 ft (15 m)
- Draft: 21 ft 1 in (6.43 m)
- Installed power: 1 × Nordberg, TSM 6 diesel engine; 1,750 shp (1,300 kW)
- Propulsion: 1 × propeller
- Speed: 11.5 kn (21.3 km/h; 13.2 mph)
- Capacity: 3,945 t (3,883 long tons) DWT; 9,830 cu ft (278 m^{3}) (refrigerated); 227,730 cu ft (6,449 m^{3}) (non-refrigerated)
- Complement: 15 Officers; 70 Enlisted
- Armament: 1 × 3 in (76 mm)/50 caliber dual purpose gun (DP); 6 × 20 mm (0.8 in) Oerlikon anti-aircraft (AA) cannons

USS Kenosha (AK-190) was an Alamosa-class cargo ship that served the US Navy during the clean-up phase of World War II. When her service was no longer required in 1946, she was decommissioned and returned to the U.S. Maritime Commission where she was sold to the Kingdom of Norway in 1947.

== Construction ==
Kenosha was launched 25 August 1944, by Walter Butler Shipbuilding Co., Superior, Wisconsin, under a U.S. Maritime Commission contract, MC hull 2121; sponsored by Miss Marion Crowley; acquired by the Navy 1 August 1945; and commissioned 7 September 1945.

== Service history ==
=== World War II-related service ===
After shakedown out of Galveston, Texas, Kenosha arrived Gulfport, Mississippi, 19 October to load cargo for the Mariana Islands. The cargo ship departed Gulfport 25 November, cleared the Panama Canal, and arrived Guam via Pearl Harbor 10 January 1946.

Upon discharging her cargo, she loaded cargo for the US Marines and sailed for the US East Coast, arriving Lynnhaven Roads, Virginia, 7 March.

=== Decommissioning ===
On 3 April Kenosha arrived Baltimore, Maryland, and decommissioned there 16 April 1946.

== Merchant history ==
She was sold to Norway on 4 March 1947, for $693,862, and renamed Rio Dale. She was renamed several times between 1958 and 1967, Torian in 1959, Lars Viking in 1963, Neptune V in 1965, and finally Arabdrill 2 in 1967, when she converted to an offshore drilling ship. She was scrapped on 24 May 1984 at Gadani beach.

== Honors and awards ==
Qualified Kenosha personnel were eligible for the following:

- American Campaign Medal
- Asiatic-Pacific Campaign Medal
- World War II Victory Medal

== Notes ==
Citations

== Bibliography ==
- "Kenosha (AK-190)". Dictionary of American Naval Fighting Ships. Naval History and Heritage Command. 28 July 2015. This article incorporates text from this source, which is in the public domain.
- "C1 Cargo Ships". www.ShipbuildingHistory.com. 28 August 2009.
- "USS Kenosha (AK-190)". NavSource. 8 November 2011.
- "Kenosha". United States Department of Transportation. Archived from the original on November 2, 2016.
