= Kenosha and Rockford Railroad =

American railroad (1861–1939)

The Kenosha and Rockford Railroad, subsequently called the KD Line, is a historic railroad that operated in Southern Wisconsin & Northern Illinois from 1861 until 1939.

== History ==
=== 19th century ===
Construction of the Kenosha, Rockford and Rock Island Railroad was encouraged by the city of Kenosha, Wisconsin. The 72-mile line began as an independent enterprise created by several Kenosha businessmen in 1853 and it was opened on July 21, 1861. Earlier plans had called for the line to be built between Kenosha and Beloit, Wisconsin, but Beloit had shown little interest in being the western terminus of the line. The construction of the railroad encouraged the development of various communities along the line.

Passenger traffic was usually light; the line served several tourist areas along the numerous lake resorts in western Kenosha County.

=== 20th century ===
As many as twelve daily trains operated during the early 20th Century; freight traffic included milk and ice from the numerous dairies and lakes along the route. The line was renamed the Kenosha and Rockford Railroad and it was eventually purchased by the Chicago and North Western Railroad. Under the CNW, it became known as the Kenosha Division, or the KD Line.

Electric refrigeration became widespread in the 1930s and the need for ice diminished. Dairy farmers also turned to trucking during and after World War II, further decreasing traffic levels. By 1938, only two mixed trains still operated, and passenger counts had diminished to one or two riders per day.

The main portion of the KD Line was abandoned by the C&NW on May 31, 1939. A crew of five on Train No. 917 left Kenosha at 9:30 AM with three fare-paying passengers: rail historian Anton E. Klova and Kenosha County Historical Society officials William E. Dickinson and C. Ernest Dewey, plus retired KD Line conductor P. H. Galligan, who rode as far as Salem. En route, the crew of No. 917 made lengthy stops at each station to strip its contents and load them aboard No. 917, which as a result arrived at Harvard, Illinois nearly eight hours late.

At its industrial far west and east ends the KD served a number of industries. The KD's biggest customer was perhaps were the American Motors Company factories in Kenosha until Chrysler, which purchased AMC in 1987, began shutting down operations over the following years. Prior to AMC it was a Nash plant. In Loves Park the KD serviced the Warner-Lambert plant which made chewing gum, Borg-Warner, and Barber-Colman. The former Warner-Lambert plant continues in operation today under Perfetti Van Melle ownership but is no longer rail served though it still maintains a connection to the KD.

Three short segments of the KD Line remain in operation today. Union Pacific services two customers in Loves Park, IL, Rock Valley Oil & Chemical and the Cimco scrapyard, using the KD Line from Rockford north. The Rockford Park District operates a seasonal, self-propelled streetcar over the KD on summer weekends when UP is not operating. From Chemung, IL, east to Harvard, IL, the Chicago-Chemung Railroad operates over 3.5 miles of the former KD Line where it connects a large grain elevator operation in Chemung to the UP Harvard Subdivision. In Wisconsin the KD Line, also called the Farm Line in this section, is in service by UP from Bain Station into downtown Kenosha. It is primarily used by UP to connect its New Line to the Old Line or Kenosha Subdivision but it does have one active, online customer left, the Ocean Spray plant on the west end.

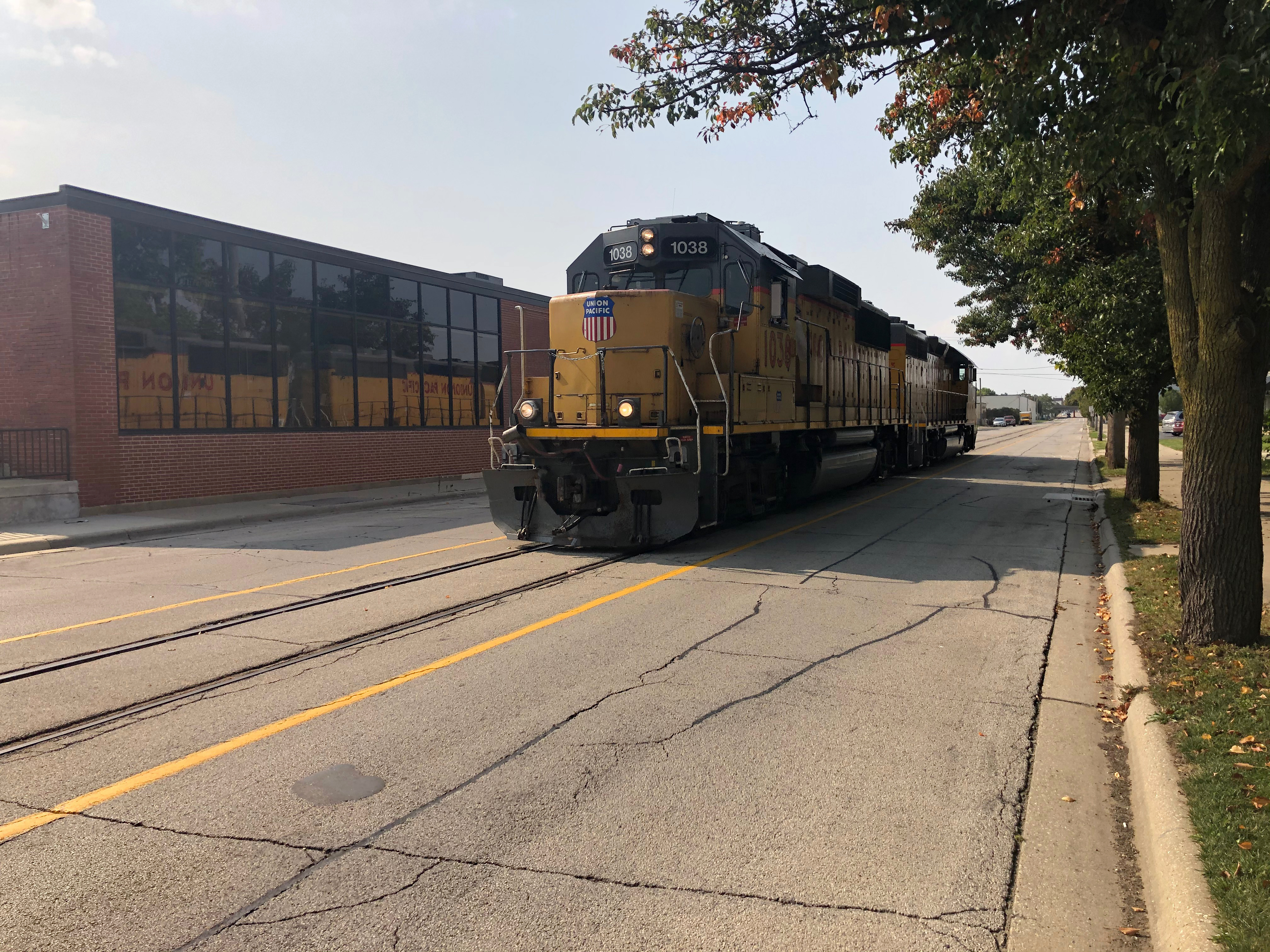
On a sunny fall day, a pair of engines is headed north on the KD Line on street trackage in Rockford.

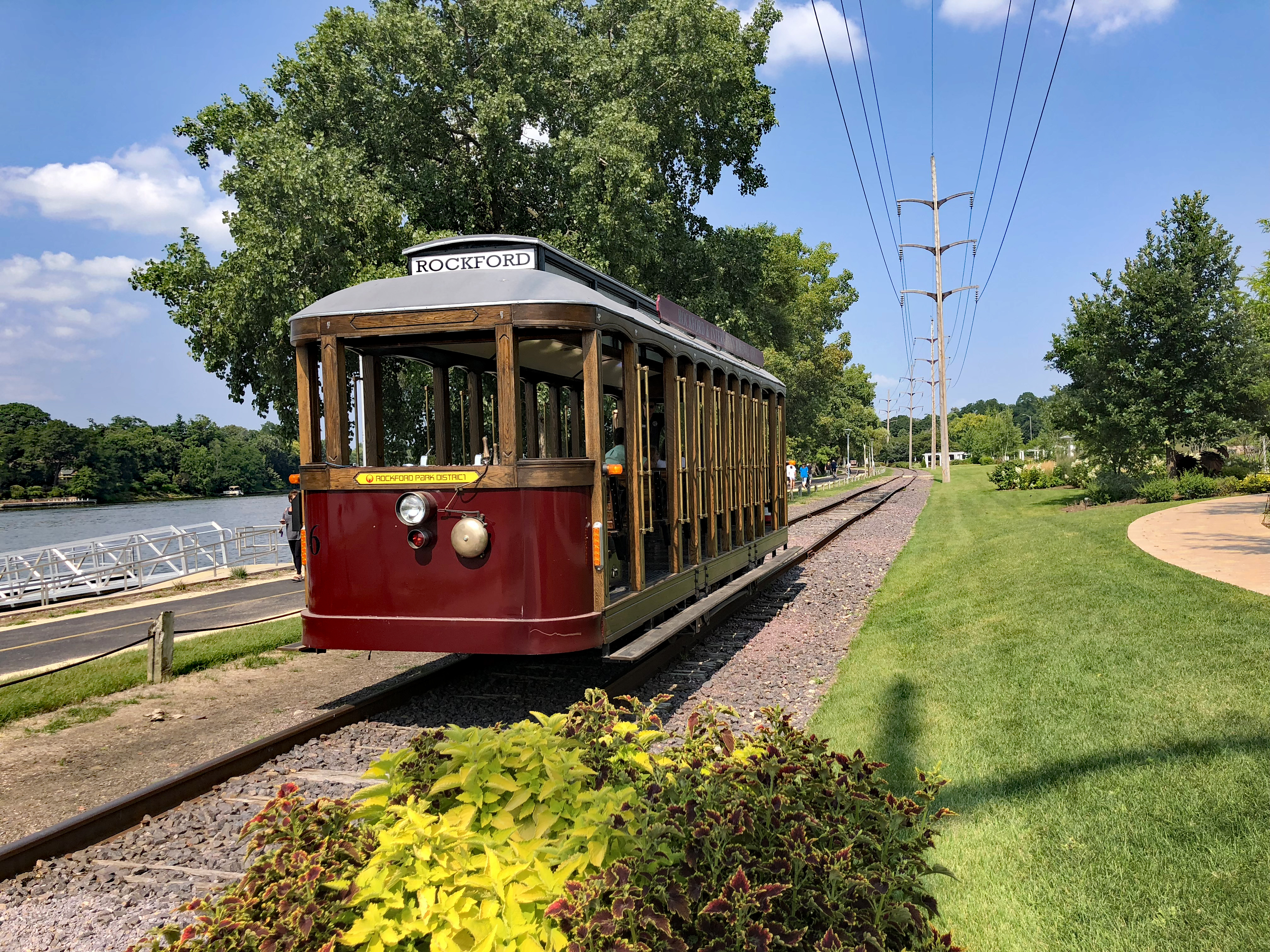
Rockford Park District streetcar heads north along the Rock River and on the KD Line.

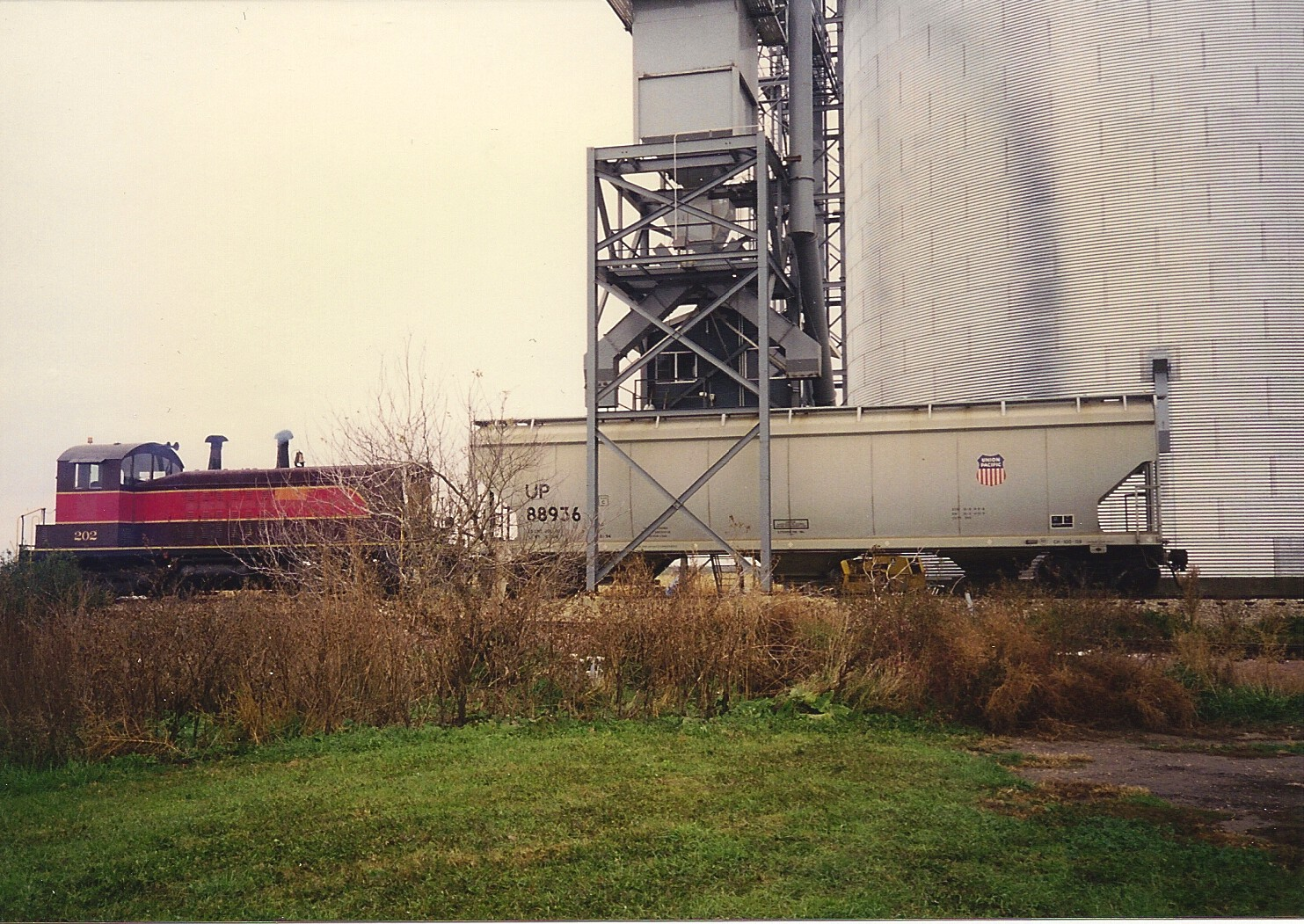
Chicago Chemung Railroad Parked on the KD Line in Chemung, IL

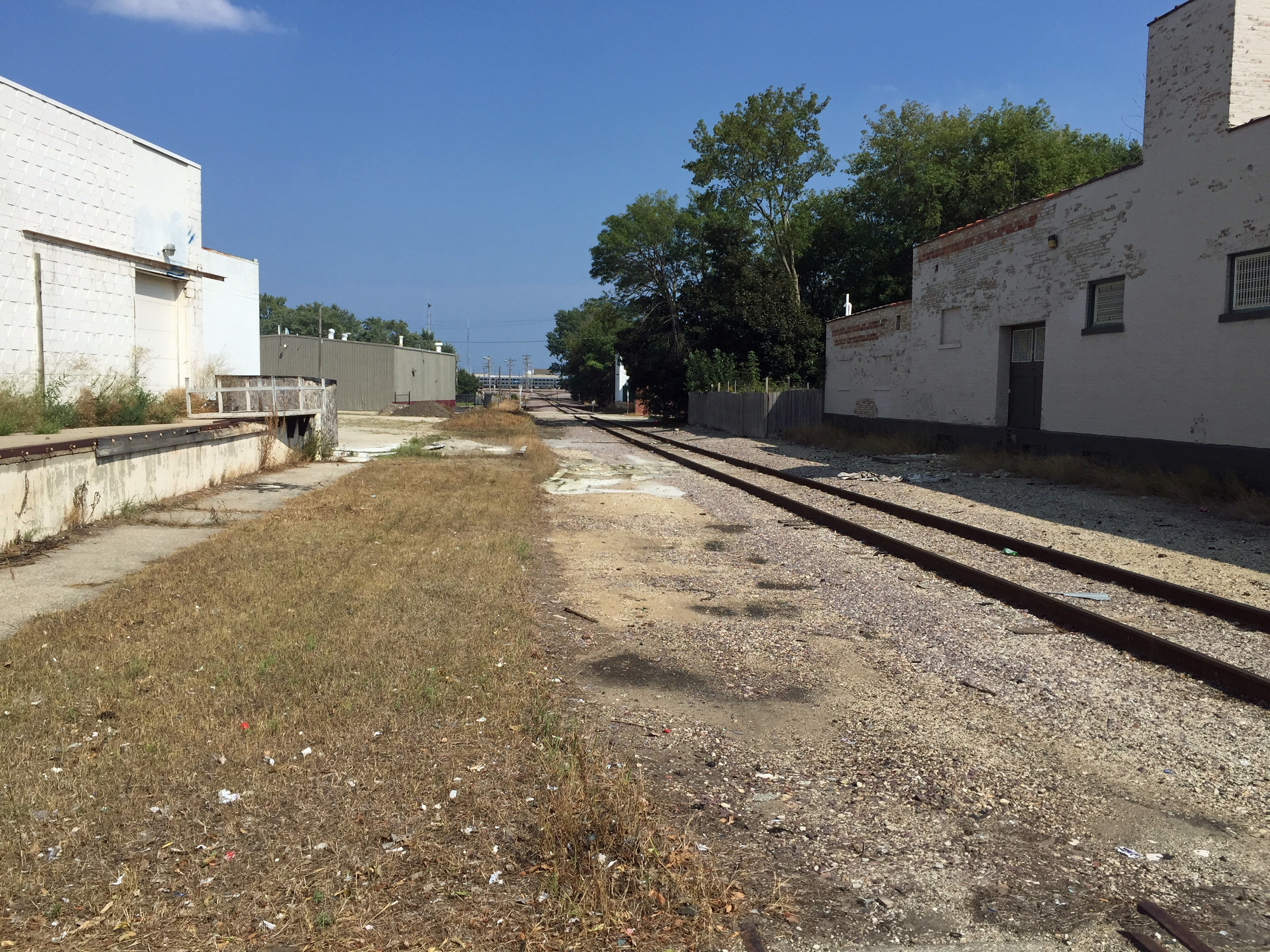
Looking east along the KD Line 19th Avenue Kenosha WI September 6 2015

The CNW was acquired by the Union Pacific Railroad in April 1995.

=== 21st century ===
UP owns and operates two of the KD Line segments: Rockford-Loves Park in Illinois and Bain Station-Kenosha in Wisconsin. DeLong Company, owner of the grain elevators in Chemung, operates the Chicago-Chemung Railroad. The Rockford Park District operates a seasonal, self-propelled streetcar over the KD during summer weekends.

== Bibliography ==
- The KD Line by P. J. Behrens (182 pages), 1986
- 2020 Harlem Township in Winnebago County, Brian Landis Co-Author
