= Kenosha Sand Dunes =

Sand dune system in Southeastern Wisconsin

Coordinates: 42°33′13″N 87°49′1″W

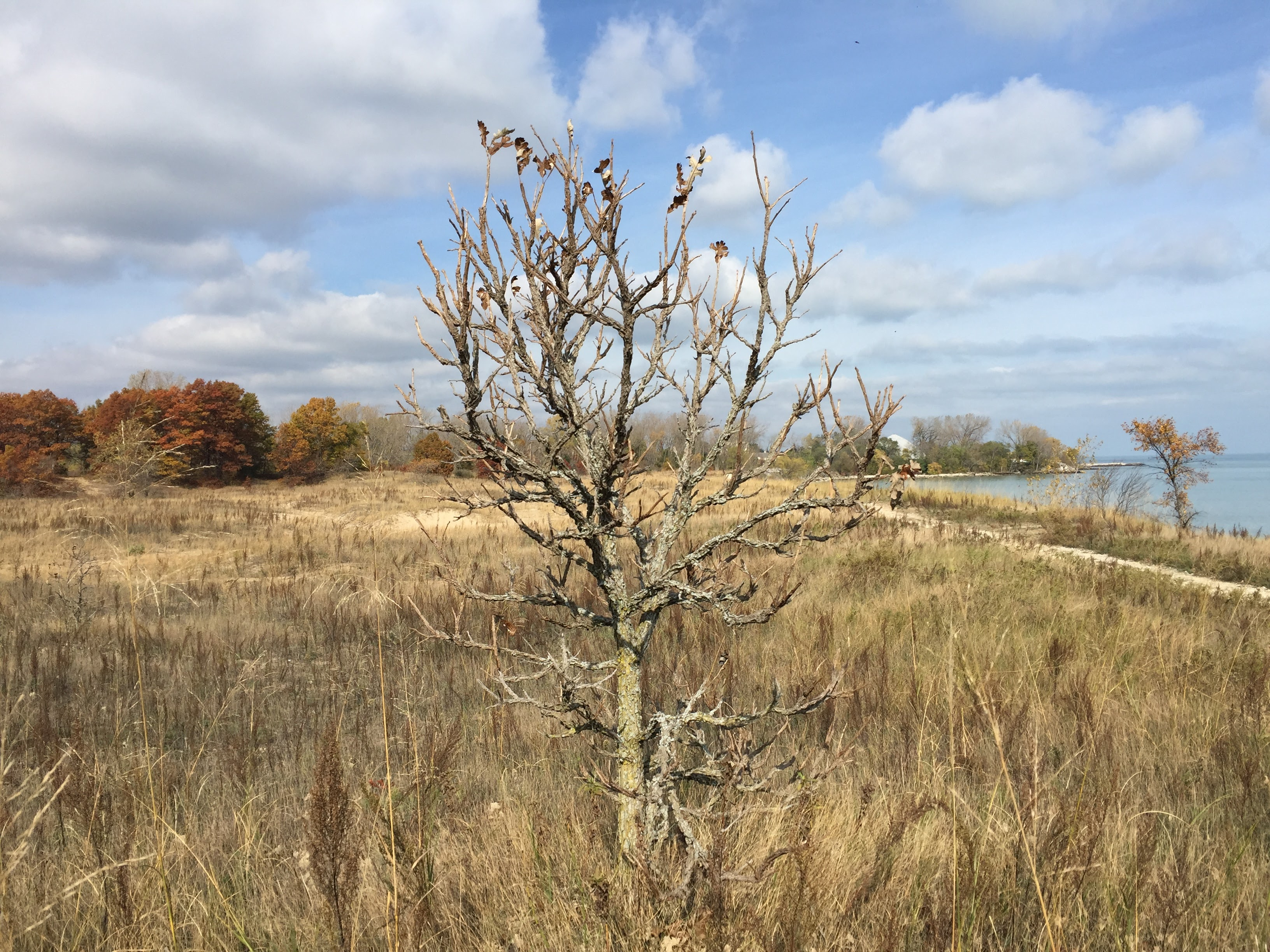
- Kenosha Dunes view to North
- Location: Chiwaukee Prairie Natural Area, Southeastern Wisconsin

The Kenosha Sand Dunes form the northern tip of the Chiwaukee Prairie Natural Area. They are one of the few remaining dune systems in Southeastern Wisconsin. They run for a half mile along Lake Michigan just to the south of Kenosha's Southport Park and are bounded on the west by 7th Avenue. The area near the shoreline has gently rolling sand dunes covered with grasses and sparse vegetation. Further west, the dunes have marshy ponds surrounded by cattails and mature trees.

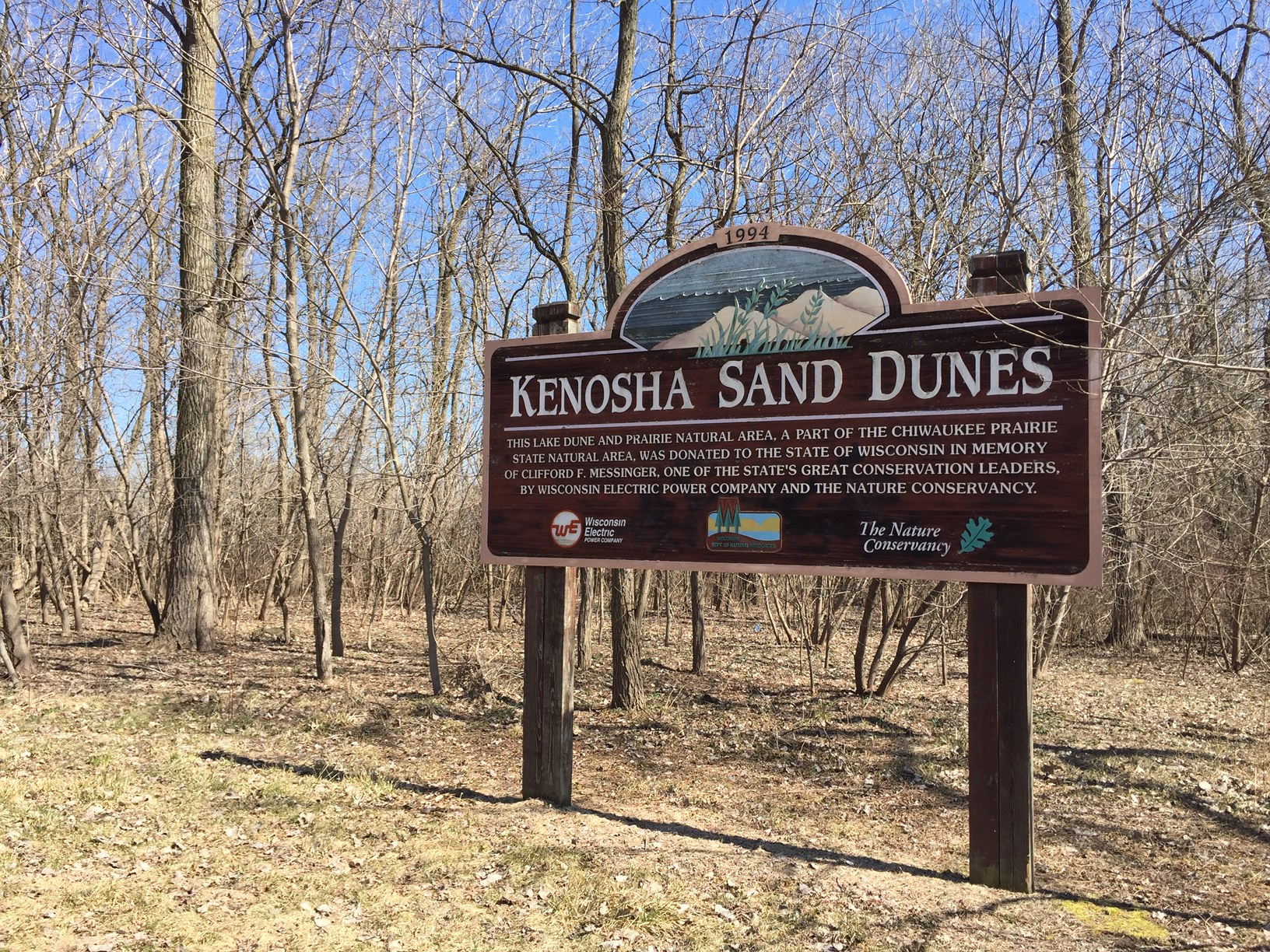

== History ==
The dunes were formed at the end of the Last Glacial Period, over 10,000 years ago. As lake water receded from the older Toleston Shoreline, wave and wind action accumulated sand in the current location of the Kenosha Dunes. The dunes were eventually stabilized by sand-binding grasses such as wild rye and wheatgrass. The decaying plant material contributed humus to the sand, which supported shrubs such as dogwood and willows. Eventually, larger trees such as black oaks, birch and cottonwood grew in the areas set back from the shoreline.

After efforts to develop a model city along the lake fell through, the Wisconsin Electric Power Company bought 130 acres of sand dunes just south of Kenosha. Their plan to put a power plant there never materialized, but they built a pumping station at the southern end of the dunes to support a power plant six miles to the west. The city of Kenosha purchased 27 acres on the north end of the dunes for a water treatment facility. In 1993, Wisconsin Power donated the remaining 62 acres to the Nature Conservancy to create the Kenosha Sand Dunes.

WEC Energy Group retains its building to the south, and the city controls the north end of the dunes. Both entities have protected their shoreline with revetments. The larger central portion of the dunes, which is managed by the Wisconsin Department of Natural Resources as part of the State Natural Area as little shoreline protection.

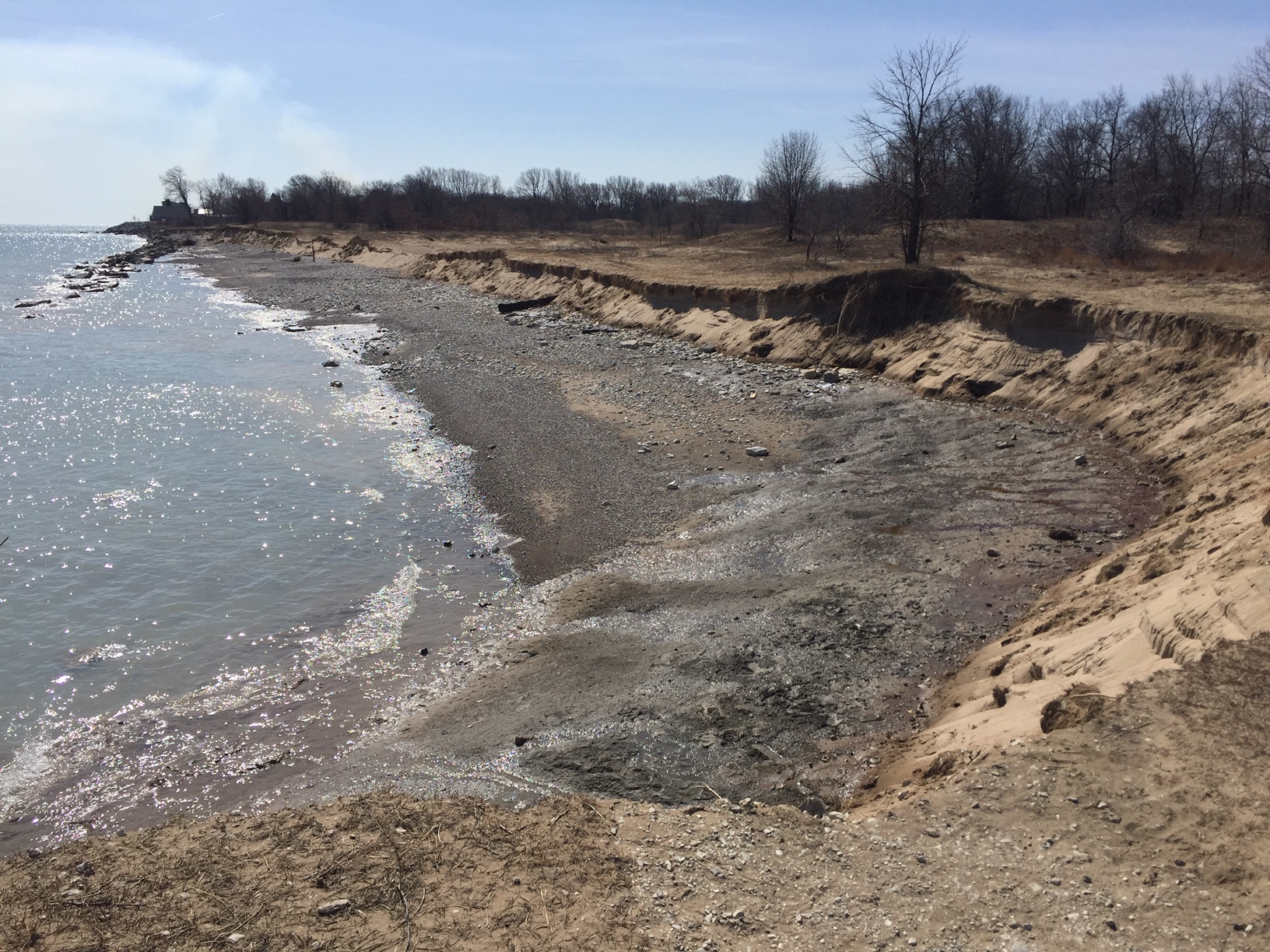
Dune erosion view to South

== Dune erosion ==
Aerial photos dating back to the late 1930s indicate that significant erosion has occurred over the decades. However, the erosion has been uneven. The north and south shorelines, protected with large stone revetments, have remained stable, while the larger central portion of the dunes, which is largely unprotected, has experienced severe erosion.

On October 31, 2014, a massive storm on Lake Michigan, which generated 20-foot waves, took a particularly heavy toll on the unprotected shoreline. Since that time, historically high water levels on the Lake have eroded another 100’ of sand, revealing the clay lake bed. After another damaging storm in early 2020, one expert predicted that if nothing was done to protect the dunes, they could be gone in four to five years. Government officials are considering building a multi-million-dollar reef structure to dampen wave action and limit further erosion.
