= List of killings by law enforcement officers in the United States, October 2020 =

This is a list of people reported killed by non-military law enforcement officers in the United States in October 2020, whether in the line of duty or not, and regardless of reason or method. The listing documents the occurrence of a death, making no implications regarding wrongdoing or justification on the part of the person killed or officer involved. Killings are arranged by date of the incident that caused death. Different death dates, if known, are noted in the description. The table below lists 110 people.

== October 2020 ==
Date	Name (age) of deceased	Race	State (city)	Description
2020-10-31	John Pacheaco Jr. (36)	White	Colorado (Glendale)	Police were called to perform a wellness check on Pacheaco, who was asleep in a pick-up truck that was reported stolen. When officers arrived, the truck move forwards and hit a police vehicle, before moving backwards and hitting several other vehicles, causing police to open fire. No firearms were found in the truck.
2020-10-31	Matthew Daniel Johnston (44)	Unknown race	Maryville, TN	
2020-10-30	Name Withheld (42)	Black	Detroit, MI	
2020-10-30	Frank Murphy (43)	White	El Paso, TX	
2020-10-30	Brandon Keith Davis (27)	Unknown race	Chattanooga, TN	
2020-10-29	Rodolfo "Rudy" Martinez-Cortez (30)	Hispanic	Salem, OR	
2020-10-29	Kevin Peterson Jr. (21)	Black	Washington (Hazel Dell)	A narcotics task force chased Peterson into a bank parking lot after a drug sting involving Xanax. Peterson ran away from the police while armed with a handgun, and it is uncertain if he fired his weapon. The officers fired a total of 34 shots at Peterson, four of which hit and killed him. Protests occurred in the nearby cities of Portland and Vancouver.
2020-10-28	Justin Esqueda (30)	Hispanic	Bakersfield, CA	
2020-10-28	Charles Robert Arviso (35)	Hispanic	Tucson, AZ	
2020-10-28	Bennie Biby (44)	White	Cadiz, KY	
2020-10-27	Clifton Gorman Spencer (35)	Unknown race	Chattanooga, TN	
2020-10-27	Ryan Fallo (20)	White	Lake Worth, FL	
2020-10-27	Isaac Lemoine Christensen (38)	White	Herriman, UT	
2020-10-27	Maurice Parker (34)	Black	Las Vegas, NV	
2020-10-26	Michael K. Nelson (27)	Unknown race	Alexandria, VA	
2020-10-26	Walter Wallace Jr. (27)	Black	Pennsylvania (Philadelphia)	Wallace was shot as he approached officers holding a knife which he refused to drop. Video shows Wallace's mother running over to him after he was shot. Protests were held in response to the shooting, and witnesses say that the police should have used less deadly force.
2020-10-26	Karon Hylton-Brown (20)	Black	Washington, D.C.	Karon Hylton-Brown was riding an electric scooter when police attempted to pull him over for not wearing a helmet. Over the course of the next few minutes they pursued him into an alleyway, where he was hit by a vehicle.
2020-10-26	Bruce Allan Shumaker (64)	Unknown race	Citrus Heights, CA	
2020-10-25	Paul Sarver (53)	White	Phoenix, AZ	
2020-10-24	Brandon Evans (33)	White	Lawrenceburg, IN	
2020-10-24	Name Withheld (36)	Unknown race	Warren, MI	
2020-10-24	Richard "RJ" James Jones (35)	White	Garden City, MO	
2020-10-24	Jakerion Shmond Jackson (19)	Black	Sylvester, GA	
2020-10-23	John Lipski (62)	White	Goodman, WI	
2020-10-23	Marc Nevarez (25)	Hispanic	Chicago, IL	
2020-10-23	Daniel Angel Villalobos-Baldovinos (30)	Hispanic	San Diego, CA	
2020-10-23	Name Withheld	Unknown race	Loma Linda, CA	
2020-10-23	Cody Jay Hadley (32)	White	Huntsville, UT	
2020-10-23	Ennice "Lil Rocc" Ross Jr. (26)	Black	Kansas City, MO	
2020-10-23	Name Withheld	Hispanic	Laredo, TX	
2020-10-22	Michael Nichols (63)	Unknown race	Kettle, WV	
2020-10-22	Name Withheld (35)	White	Barstow, CA	
2020-10-22	Keith Beecroft (43)	Unknown	Alaska (Anchorage)	Beecroft, who was armed with a shotgun, was shot and killed by a SWAT team. Five SWAT officers fired their weapons.
2020-10-22	Mark Bender (35)	Black	California (San Bernardino)	Police responded to a call of a man with a gun jumping on cars. Bender refused to follow verbal commands from the officer, and engaged in a physical confrontation with him. Bender was shot when he pulled a gun from his pocket and turned toward the officer.
2020-10-22	Francisco Danny Flores (30)	Hispanic	Casa Grande, AZ	
2020-10-22	Sook Hee Lee (65)	Asian	Clifton, NJ	
2020-10-21	Gregory Jackson (45)	Black	Moss Point, MS	
2020-10-21	Steven Belville (35)	White	Bradenton, FL	
2020-10-20	Dominique Mulkey (26)	Black	Florida (Tampa)	Mulkey was confronted by two officers on suspicion of armed robbery of a Dollar General store. The officers told Mulkey to drop his gun, at which point he turned toward the officers, leading them to open fire.
2020-10-20	Emmett Cocreham (44)	Hispanic	Phoenix, AZ	
2020-10-20	George Cocreham (43)	Hispanic	Phoenix, AZ	
2020-10-20	James Collins (61)	White	Spring Hill, FL	
2020-10-20	Name Withheld	Unknown race	Perdido Key, FL	
2020-10-20	Marcellis Stinnette (19)	Black	Illinois (Waukegan)	At 11:55 p.m., Waukegan police stopped a car in which the passenger, Marcellis Stinnette, was wanted on a warrant. The driver fled and her vehicle was chased. When the car stopped a second time, the vehicle reversed toward the officers, and one officer fired his pistol in fear for his safety. Both the driver and passenger were struck by gunfire. The driver, a Black woman in her 20s from Waukegan, was taken to a hospital with serious injuries and is expected to recover, police said. The male passenger, Marcellis Stinnette, 19, was taken to an area hospital and died.
2020-10-19	Bryan Selmer (38)	Unknown	Maryland (Emmitsburg)	Selmer was fleeing with another man, who was wanted for attempted murder in Hanover, Pennsylvania. Police attempted to arrest Selmer at a gas station and say they shot him when he turned around in a "shooting stance". Selmer was not armed at the time, although deputies say they believed he could have been due to police being fired upon earlier.
2020-10-19	Ethan Freeman (37)	White	New Hampshire (Thornton)	Freeman had a history of mental illness, and charged at an officer multiple times holding a piece of broken furniture, and threatened to kill the officer. The officer repeatedly yelled at Freeman to back up, and shot him dead on one of his charges.
2020-10-19	Paul Sulkowski (46)	Unknown race	Coram, NY	
2020-10-19	Jose Alfredo Castro-Gutierrez (39)	Hispanic	San Diego, CA	
2020-10-19	Name Withheld (43)	White	South Milwaukee, WI	
2020-10-18	Gregory Putnik (32)	White	Fresno, CA	
2020-10-18	Chistopher John Kitts (43)	White	Lakeview, GA	
2020-10-18	Tutuila Pine Koonwaiyou (37)	Asian	Tooele, UT	
2020-10-18	Name Withheld (56)	Unknown race	Sunrise, FL	
2020-10-17	Bradley Pugh (41)	White	Huntsville, AL	
2020-10-17	Paul Bailey (21)	White	Davisville, WV	
2020-10-17	Darren W. Randolph (53)	White	Greenville, KY	
2020-10-17	Richard Romero	Hispanic	Laguna, NM	
2020-10-16	Fred Williams III (25)	Black	California (Willowbrook)	At about 5:30 p.m., deputies saw a group of about 10 to 15 people in the parking lot, according to a news release from the L.A. County Sheriff's Department. The deputies said one of the people in the group was holding a firearm and when he saw the deputies, he ran out of the parking lot. One of the deputies chased the man, identified as Williams, down a driveway and into a strangers backyard. Authorities said that Williams pointed his gun at a deputy, "at which point a deputy involved shooting occurred." Williams was pronounced dead at the scene. The department said it recovered a semiautomatic handgun from the scene. The bodycam footage appears to show Williams climbing the fence when he was shot, and that he did not have his gun pointed at the officer who shot him.
2020-10-16	Jason Edward Galliart (41)	Unknown race	Albuquerque, NM	
2020-10-16	Justin Dawley	White	Callahan, FL	
2020-10-16	Alberto Rivas (57)	Hispanic	Huntsville, AL	
2020-10-16	George Ludrou Job (19)	White	Sioux Falls, SD	
2020-10-16	Akbar Muhammad Eaddy (27)	Black	Rock Island, IL	
2020-10-15	Christopher Allen Kanouff (48)	White	Clearfield, PA	
2020-10-15	William Earl Lane (46)	White	Riesel, TX	
2020-10-15	Armando Sabat (71)	Unknown race	Los Alamitos, CA	
2020-10-15	Dana Mitchell Young Jr. (47)	Black	Los Angeles, CA	
2020-10-14	Kevin Carr (23)	Black	Los Angeles, CA	
2020-10-14	Jericho Wynos (45)	Native American	Cookson, OK	
2020-10-14	Yoel Arnaldo Mejia Santel (28)	Hispanic	Frostproof, FL	
2020-10-14	Jason Arpad Peters (45)	White	Kingman, AZ	
2020-10-14	Edwin Morales (29)	Hispanic	Hyattsville, MD	
2020-10-14	Steven Vest (30)	White	Chico, CA	
2020-10-13	Miguel A. Nevarez Jr. (36)	Hispanic	Houma, LA	
2020-10-13	Jose Marcos Ramirez (27)	Hispanic	Bakersfield, CA	
2020-10-13	Rodney Ross (30)	White	South Bend, IN	
2020-10-12	Anthony Jones (24)	Black	Bethel Springs, TN	
2020-10-12	Cole F. Stump (29)	Native American	Billings, MT	
2020-10-12	Matthew Montoya (52)	Hispanic	Albuquerque, NM	
2020-10-12	Julie Fandino (58)	White	Vermont (Barre Town)	An on-duty Berlin police officer, Jeffrey Strock, shot and killed his ex-girlfriend, Julie Fandino, before killing himself.
2020-10-10	Shawn Campbell (29)	Unknown race	Kingman, AZ	
2020-10-10	Cesar Vargas (21)	Hispanic	San Francisco, CA	
2020-10-09	Kalun Purucker (29)	White	Salina, KS	
2020-10-09	Sylvia Kirchner (41)	White	Myrtle Beach, SC	
2020-10-09	Anthony Michael Legato (25)	White	Hinkley, MN	
2020-10-09	Ariel Esau Lujan (29)	Hispanic	Houston, TX	
2020-10-08	Shayne Sutherland (29)	White	California (Stockton)	Police responded to a call that Sutherland was threatening people with a bottle at a gas station. Sutherland told officers he was "high on cocaine" and tried to flee. Several officers held Sutherland down, where he fell unconscious, and later died in hospital.
2020-10-08	Stanley Cochran (29)	Black	Philadelphia, PA	
2020-10-08	William Sendelbach (32)	White	Wabash, IN	
2020-10-08	Tyran Dent (24)	Black	Queens, NY	
2020-10-08	Justin Caldwell (47)	Unknown race	Palm City, FL	
2020-10-06	Chester McDonald (44)	Unknown race	Georgetown, KY	
2020-10-06	Douglas Sanchez (54)	Hispanic	Sterling, CO	
2020-10-06	Nick Burgos (34)	Hispanic	Torrance, CA	
2020-10-06	John Hare (62)	White	Fayetteville, NC	
2020-10-06	Crystal Renee Starling Mcclinton (48)	White	Hillard, FL	
2020-10-05	Juan Adrian Garcia (47)	Hispanic	Napa, CA	
2020-10-05	Sofia Gomez Aguilon (20)	Hispanic	New York, NY	
2020-10-04	Andrew A. Williams (41)	Unknown race	Vancouver, WA	
2020-10-04	Christopher Ulmer (30)	Unknown race	Chula Vista, CA	
2020-10-04	Diego Eguino-Alcala (27)	Hispanic	Las Cruces, NM	
2020-10-04	Austin Manzano (24)	Unknown race	Camarillo, CA	
2020-10-03	Jonathan Price (31)	African American	Texas (Wolfe City)	Price was killed by Officer Shaun Lucas after breaking up a fight at a gas station. Lucas tasered Price, before shooting him. Officer Lucas was arrested for the murder on October 5, 2020. Lucas was acquitted of all charges in September 2022.
2020-10-03	John Aycoth (20)	Unknown race	Myrtle Beach, SC	
2020-10-02	Mickel Erich Lewis Sr. (39)	Unknown race	Mojave, CA	
2020-10-02	Jason Rodriguez (46)	Hispanic	Fresno, CA	
2020-10-02	James Edward Baker (38)	White	Tallahassee, FL	
2020-10-02	Justin Lee Tofte (33)	White	Longview, WA	
2020-10-02	Eric Marc-Matthew Allport (43)	White	Madison Heights, MI	
2020-10-01	Name Withheld	Unknown race	Coal City, WV	

== See also ==
- Death in custody § United States
- Henry A. Wallace Police Crime Public Database
- List of cases of police brutality
- List of countries with annual rates and counts for killings by law enforcement officers
- List of law enforcement officers killed in the line of duty in the United States
- List of law enforcement officers convicted for an on-duty killing in the United States
- List of shootings by US immigration agents
- List of police reforms related to the George Floyd protests
- List of unarmed African Americans killed by law enforcement officers in the United States
- Lists of killings by law enforcement officers
- Police brutality in the United States
- Police misconduct § United States
- Police riot § United States
- Police use of deadly force in the United States
