= 1966 United States Senate election in Illinois =

- November 8, 1966
- Turnout: 71.56%
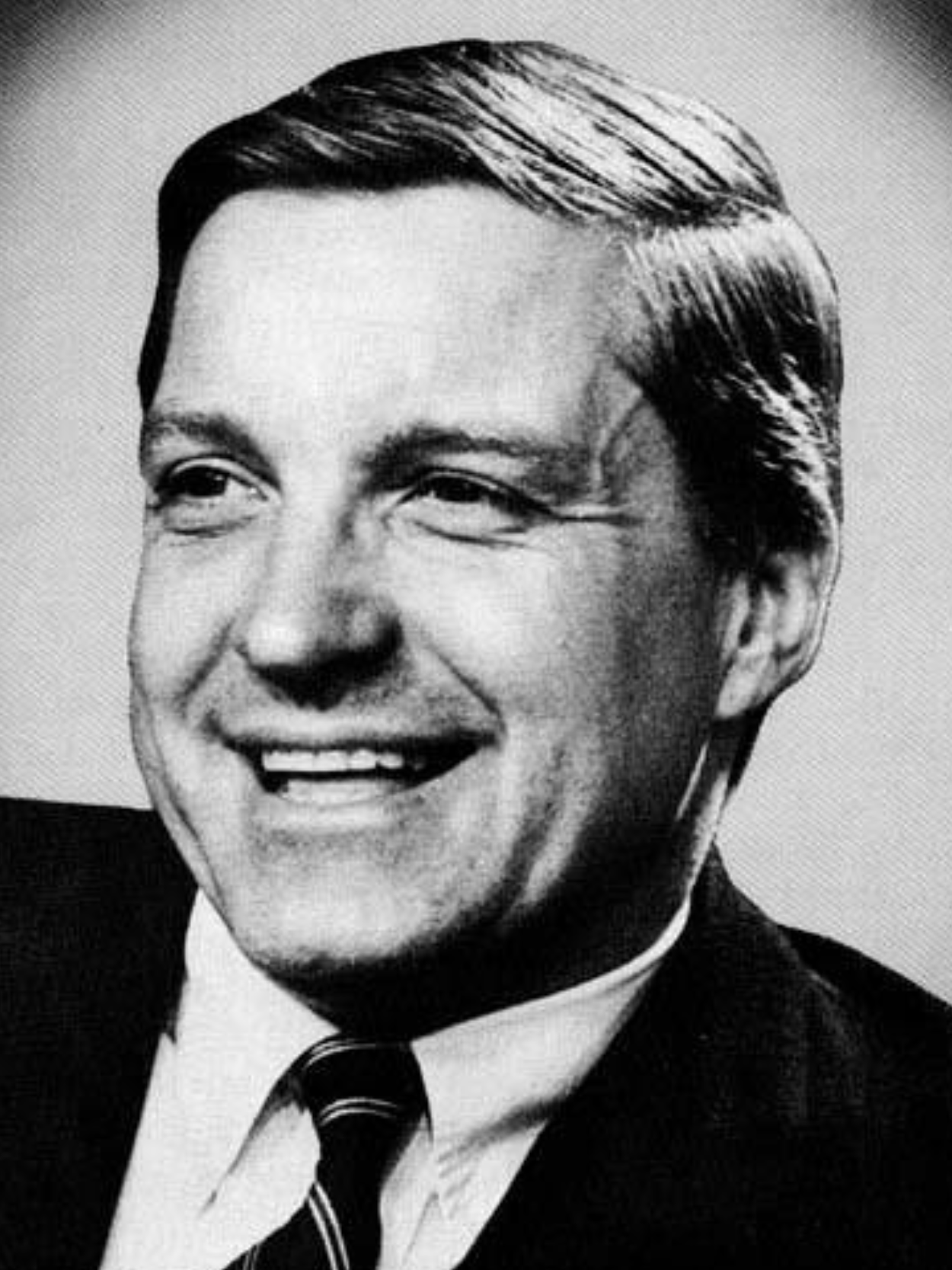

Nominee	Charles Percy	Paul Douglas
Party	Republican	Democratic
Popular vote	2,100,449	1,678,147
Percentage	54.95%	43.90%
- County results Percy: 50–60% 60–70% 70–80% Douglas: 50–60%
U.S. senator before election
Paul Douglas
Democratic
Elected U.S. Senator
Charles H. Percy
Republican

The 1966 United States Senate election in Illinois took place on November 8, 1966. Incumbent Democratic United States Senator Paul Douglas, seeking a fourth term in the United States Senate, faced off against Republican Charles H. Percy, a businessman and the 1964 Republican nominee for Governor of Illinois. A competitive election ensued, featuring campaign appearances by former vice president Richard M. Nixon on behalf of Percy. Ultimately, Percy ended up defeating Senator Douglas by a fairly wide margin, allowing him to win what would be the first of three terms in the Senate.

== Background ==
The primary (held on June 14) and general election coincided with those for House and state elections.

Turnout in the primaries was 27.13%, with 1,509,302 votes cast.

Turnout during the general election was 71.56%, with a total of 3,822,724 votes cast.

== Democratic primary ==
Incumbent Paul Douglas was renominated, running unopposed.

=== Candidates ===
- Paul Douglas, incumbent U.S. Senator

=== Results ===
Democratic primary results
Party	Candidate	Votes	%
Democratic	Paul H. Douglas (incumbent)	840,936	100
Write-in		3	0.00
Total votes		840,939	100

== Republican primary ==
Businessman Charles H. Percy won the Republican primary by a large margin.

=== Candidates ===
- Howard J. Doyle
- Charles H. Percy, businessman and 1964 Illinois gubernatorial nominee
- Lar Daly, perennial candidate

=== Results ===
Republican primary results
Party	Candidate	Votes	%
Republican	Charles H. Percy	605,815	90.64
Republican	Howard J. Doyle	38,636	5.78
Republican	Lar "America First" Daly	23,889	3.57
Write-in		23	0.00
Total votes		668,363	100

== Write-in candidates ==
- Maxwell Primack
- Robert Sabonjian, Mayor of Waukegan

== General election ==
=== Results ===
United States Senate election in Illinois, 1966
Party	Candidate	Votes	%	±%
Republican	Charles H. Percy	2,100,449	54.95%	+9.75%
Democratic	Paul H. Douglas (incumbent)	1,678,147	43.90%	−10.73%
Write-in	Robert Sabonjian	41,965	1.10%	
Write-in	Maxwell Primack	1,693	0.04%	
Write-in	Others	470	0.01%	
Majority		422,302	11.05%	+1.61%
Turnout		3,822,724	71.56	
Republican gain from Democratic		Swing		

== See also ==
- United States Senate elections, 1966
