= Waukegan River =

Physical characteristics
- Source
  - location: Waukegan, Illinois
  - coordinates: 42°20′55″N 87°50′35″W
  - elevation: 623 ft (190 m)
- Mouth
  - location: Confluence with Lake Michigan, Waukegan, Illinois
  - coordinates: 42°21′20″N 87°49′32″W
  - elevation: 577 ft (176 m)
- Length: 3 mi (4.8 km)

Basin features
- Progression: Waukegan River → Lake Michigan → Great Lakes → Saint Lawrence Seaway → Gulf of Saint Lawrence
- GNIS ID: 420651

The Waukegan River, a small river in Lake County, Illinois, is a member of the very small class of Illinois rivers that flow into Lake Michigan. It drains part of the city of Waukegan, Illinois, including the city's historic downtown area. The river's drainage area comprises 7,785.63 acres. The drainage is managed by the city of Waukegan.

Geological features associated with the end of the Wisconsin glaciation ensured that most of that portion of Illinois that drains into the St. Lawrence River is covered in water. Only a thin strip of land on the extreme northeastern coast of Illinois naturally drains into Lake Michigan and from thence to Canada. The Waukegan River, a river of less than three miles in length, drains part of this ribbon-like strip. Only a short distance away, the western neighborhoods of Waukegan drain into the Des Plaines River, which flows in a completely different direction.

The mouth of the river is marked by Waukegan Harbor Light.
