= Killing of Marcellis Stinnette =

2020 police shooting in Waukegan, Illinois, US

- Date: October 20, 2020
- Location: Waukegan, Illinois, United States; 42.34937°N 87.83319°W

Marcellis Stinnette, a 19-year-old Black man, was fatally shot by police officer Dante Salinas in Waukegan, Illinois, United States shortly before midnight on October 20, 2020. He was the passenger in a vehicle that was stopped by police, who were attempting to arrest him on an outstanding warrant. According to police, the officer opened fire when the vehicle moved in reverse towards the officer. The driver, Tafarra Willams, was also wounded but survived. The officer has been fired, and another officer has been placed on administrative leave. Body camera, dashboard camera, and surveillance video of the incident has been publicly released, and the Illinois State Police and Federal Bureau of Investigation have opened investigations. Demonstrations were held in Waukegan in the ensuing days.

== Initial stop ==
On the evening of Tuesday, October 20, 2020, 19-year-old Stinnette and his 20-year-old girlfriend Williams, who had a child together, were in their parked car outside Williams's mother's house in Waukegan, Illinois, a suburb of about 86,000 people 30 miles (48 km) north of Chicago. According to police, a suspicious vehicle was reported shortly before midnight, and when a Waukegan police officer approached the car to investigate, it unexpectedly fled.

In an October 27 statement to reporters from her hospital room, Williams disputed the official police account. According to Williams, while she and Stinnette were sitting in their parked car, an officer pulled up without activating his car's lights or siren. Williams said she opened the window and turned on her car's interior lights. The officer referred to Stinnette by name, saying "I know you from jail", and referred to Williams as Stinnette's "baby mother". According to Williams, when Williams asked the officer if they were free to leave, the officer stepped back from the car, and Williams drove away slowly; the officer did not activate his car's lights or follow Williams.

Body camera footage of the initial stop by the White police officer released on October 28 shows the officer telling Stinnette that he is under arrest three times, the second time stating that Stinnette had an outstanding warrant for his arrest. The officer has his hand on the car and tells Stinnette to exit the vehicle, when the car "speeds off". It is unclear from the footage whether the car made contact with the officer. The officer does not immediately pursue Williams, instead he calls for backup, identifying Williams and Stinnette by name.

== Second stop ==
A short time later, a different police officer stopped the car about a half-mile away. According to police, when Salinas approached the car, it reversed towards Salinas, and Salinas opened fire into the car with his semiautomatic pistol.

In her October 27 statement, Williams disputed the police's account, telling the press, "There was a crash, and I lost control. The officer was shooting at us. The car ended up slamming into a building." According to Williams, she told the officer she was unarmed, but the officer "kept shooting" and told her to get out of the car. Shot and bleeding, she exited the car. According to Williams, the police covered Stinnette with a blanket while he was still breathing.

According to NBC News, dashboard camera footage from the Salinas' vehicle released on October 28 shows Williams's car, with an officer in pursuit, turning in front of the second officer's car, before stopping on a grass embankment about twenty seconds later. According to CNN, Williams passed another police car, failed to stop at a stop sign, drove onto the opposite shoulder, and hit a telephone pole guy wire. The second officer pulled up next to Williams's car. It is unclear whether the officer exited his vehicle before yelling "get out of the fucking", at which point Williams's car begins to reverse. The car cannot be seen in the dash camera footage at this point, but the audio can be heard of an engine roaring and six or seven gunshots, followed by tires squealing and a crash. Two surveillance videos released on October 28 show Williams's car reversing and crashing into a building, but do not show the officer in the frame. Salinas' body camera was not activated at the time of the shooting, and no video released on October 28 shows the shots being fired.

Both Stinnette and Williams were taken to the local hospital. Stinnette died shortly thereafter. Williams survived wounds to her stomach and hand. Police said no weapons were found in the car.

== Investigation ==
Salinas, who had been with the department for five years, was fired on October 23 for "multiple policy and procedure violations", including failing to activate his body camera, according to the police chief. The White officer, who also had been with the department for five years, was placed on administrative leave. Neither officer had been identified as of October 28.

The Illinois State Police and the Federal Bureau of Investigation are investigating the shooting. Lake County State's Attorney Michael Nerheim pledged to release the investigative file to the public if his office decides not to file criminal charges.

Williams is represented by civil rights attorneys Ben Crump and Antonio Romanucci, who also represented the families of George Floyd and Daniel Prude. The attorneys said the officer's firing was "a first step in police accountability" but that they would press ahead with their own investigation.

On September 22, 2022, Salinas was arrested and charged with three counts of second-degree murder and one count of involuntary manslaughter.

== Protests ==
A rally was held on October 22; demonstrators demanded release of the video footage and federal investigations. The mayor of Waukegan, Sam Cunningham, who is African-American and close friends with the family of the victim, asked for calm. Members of the family of Jacob Blake, who was shot by police in Kenosha, Wisconsin, 16 miles (26 km) north of Waukegan, attended the demonstration. The shooting occurred just days after third-degree murder charges for Derek Chauvin, the police officer who murdered George Floyd, were dismissed. Another protest had been planned for October 24.

Clyde McLemore, head of the Lake County chapter of Black Lives Matter, was among those calling for a federal investigation and the release of police video of the shooting. He also said the protest and march were planned to demand a special prosecutor and the release of the name of the officer involved. He also called for the officer to be arrested and prosecuted to face murder and attempted murder charges.
