= Senator Morris =

Senator Morris may refer to:

== Members of the Australian Senate ==
- John Morris (Australian politician) (1936–2013), Australian Senator for New South Wales from 1985 to 1990
- Kenneth Morris (politician) (1903–1978), Australian Senator for Queensland from 1963 to 1968

== Members of the Jamaican Senate ==
- Floyd Morris (born 1969), Jamaican Senator from 1998 to 2016

== Members of the United States Senate ==
- Gouverneur Morris (1752–1816), U.S. Senator from New York from 1800 to 1803
- Robert Morris (financier) (1734–1806), U.S. Senator from Pennsylvania from 1789 to 1795
- Thomas Morris (Ohio politician) (1776–1844), U.S. Senator from Ohio from 1833 to 1839

== United States state senate members ==
- Bill Morris (Illinois politician) (fl. 1970s–1980s), Illinois State Senate
- Calvary Morris (1798–1871), Ohio State Senate
- Earle Morris Jr. (1928–2011), South Carolina State Senate
- Harvey R. Morris (1807–1886), New York State Senate
- Lewis Morris (1726–1798), New York State Senate
- Lorenzo Morris (1817–1903), New York State Senate
- Luzon B. Morris (1827–1895), Connecticut State Senate
- Mathias Morris (1787–1839), Pennsylvania State Senate
- Oscar Morris (1876–1939), Wisconsin State Senate
- Richard Morris (New York judge) (1730–1810), New York State Senate
- Stephen Morris (politician) (born 1946), Kansas State Senate
- Thomas Morris (Wisconsin politician) (1861–1928), Wisconsin State Senate
