= Robert Sabonjian =

American politician (1916–1992)

Robert Vernon Sabonjian (1916–1992) was a politician who served as mayor of Waukegan, Illinois for six terms.

== Early life ==
His father, Lazarus Sabonjian, worked for American Steel and Wire Co., where he eventually became a foreman. Lazarus was born in Diyarbakır, in what was then the Ottoman Empire. He married Zaruhi. The family lived on Waukegan's South Side, the heart of the city's Armenian community. The family name means "son of a soap-maker".

As a boy, Robert—known as Bob—was a boxer and wrestler who earned the nickname "the Rock". He graduated from Waukegan Township High School and served with the Coast Guard during World War II. In 1947, he married Lorene, whom he met at Great Lakes Naval Training Base. Together, they opened a dry-cleaning business known as Dutch Mill Cleaners. They adopted two children, Dana and Robert.

Sabonjian worked for some time as a television announcer for wrestling matches.

== Political career ==
He served as mayor of Waukegan over five terms between 1957 and 1977 and again between 1985 and 1989. During this time, he was often compared to Chicago mayor Richard J. Daley for a style of running the city that relied heavily on personal patronage.

Early on in his career, Sabonjian received the ire of the Democratic party and the title of "maverick" for appointing Republicans to city jobs.

In 1966, he played a controversial role in the city's unrest, during which he dismissed those involved as "junkheads and winos" and moreover blamed the NAACP. He also gave "shoot to kill" orders to police.

He was initially affiliated with the Democratic Party. He ran a write-in campaign for United States Senate in 1966 against Paul Douglas and Charles Percy. His campaign centered on calling for "ultimate victory" in Vietnam, and calling for civil rights protesters to stop complaining and start working. He also called for sending unwed mothers to jail and placing their children in orphanages. Of police tactics in response to riots, he called for "animals" to be treated like animals. He assured voters that they need not spell his name correctly to have their vote count for him.

As a supporter of businesses, Sabonjian attacked any suggestion that industry in Waukegan caused pollution, insisting, for example, that there was "no proof that PCBs were harmful."

In 1969, he changed his affiliation to Republican in 1969 after the Democratic Party refused to endorse him for a fourth term. He subsequently won with 75 percent of the vote.

In 1970, he famously fired striking police officers. He also championed the expansion of Waukegan to the west, which included Lakehurst shopping center. In total, the city expanded by some 20 square miles under Sabonjian's watch.

In 1971, Sabonjian was subject to allegations of corruption, including collusion with gambling and prostitution interests. He was cleared of these charges, but ordered by a grand jury to stop accepting a car free of charge from a local car dealership.

In 1977, he lost the mayoral election to reformer Bill Morris. He left a photo of himself in the office with a note reading, "Good luck, you Irish S.O.B. Bob."

During his political comeback in 1985, Sabonjian boasted of how his supporters "came to the polls like locusts to vote for Bob Sabonjian." After he was returned to the mayoral office, Sabonjian made headlines by firing Waukegan's environmental inspector and finance director, who were hired under Morris's administration. Sabonjian also hired his daughter as an administrative assistant. He claimed during this term that Waukegan was "becoming the French Riviera of the Midwest." Sabonjian was also part of a plan to construct a stadium for the Chicago Bears on Waukegan's west side.

Haig Paravonian took over the office of mayor after Sabonjian retired in 1989.

== Death and legacy ==
Sabonjian died in Milwaukee in August 1992 after a stroke. He was survived by his wife Lorene, his daughter Dana, and his son Robert Jr. City buildings lowered flags to half staff in his memory.

Sabonjian's son, Robert Jr., served as mayor of Waukegan from 2009 to 2013.

A portion of Madison Street was renamed Robert V. Sabonjian Place, and both City Hall and the Police Department are located there.

Sabonjian's name was read in the Congressional Record by US Representative Robert McClory as a shining example of Waukegan's Armenian community and in commemoration of the formation of the Armenian Republic in 1918.
