= Waukegan riot of 1966 =

1966 race riot in the United States

- Part of Ghetto riots
- Date: August 26–29, 1966
- Location: Waukegan, Illinois

Parties
Local African Americans and Puerto Rican residents	Waukegan Police Department

Lead figures
	Mayor Robert Sabonjian

Casualties
- Arrested: 100+

Waukegan riot of 1966 was a period of conflict between police and some residents of the town's predominantly African-American and Puerto Rican neighborhoods on the south side that occurred in the midst of the Civil Rights Movement.

The march coincided with a push toward desegregation at Whittier Elementary School. Almost entirely African-American, Whittier's enrollment stood in contrast to Waukegan's four other elementary schools, two of which were all white and two of which were 99% white. As of early September, the Whittier community protested this segregation by boycotting, with less than a quarter of students showing up for class.

== Background ==
On Friday, August 26, an African-American police officer named Ernest Jones attempted to arrest Roosevelt Saunders, an African-American man. A fight ensued, and Saunders escaped into a crowd, and several days of rioting followed. The fact that the catalyzing encounter involved two African-Americans prompted some to suggest that the unrest was not about race, but the event highlighted a deep sense of disempowerment among the African-American community.

By August 28, 200 police were called to a 2 square mile area bounded by the streets of Genesee, 10th, McAllister, and South Avenue. As a mostly young crowd battled with police, a Puerto Rican family of six got caught in the crossfire, their car being hit by a Molotov cocktail while returning from church. The Waukegan branch of the NAACP later raised money for these victims.

By the night of 29 August, police with riot helmets and shotguns had established a curfew beginning at 7:30 pm for the region enclosed by Belvidere Street, McAlister Street, South Avenue, and Lake Michigan. Over 100 African-Americans were arrested over the course of the weekend.

== Response ==
Waukegan Mayor Robert Sabonjian had harsh words for those involved in the riots, calling them "local hopheads, narcotic addicts, drunkards, and just plain scum" and vowed that anyone involved in public housing would be evicted. He also reportedly issued an order to police of "shoot to kill."

Subsequently, Sabonjian held talks with community leaders and the NAACP, which vowed to open dialogue about segregation, police brutality, and the lack of recreation facilities in African-American and Puerto Rican neighborhoods of the city. Talks fell apart, though, when Sabonjian reiterated charges at the meeting that the NAACP had orchestrated the August unrest. He refused to apologize for the remarks, prompting the NAACP to walk out of talks. The NAACP were also upset by Sabonjian's proposed measure in the city council, which required that all civil rights demonstrations consist of less than 100 people, and that all participants in these demonstrations were required to have their names submitted to the city police department four days beforehand. In response, the NAACP along with other community leaders organized a march of over 200 people on 10 September through downtown Waukegan. The crowd, mostly African-American, carried signs protesting segregated schools and racist housing policies.

In the wake of the march, Sabonjian backpedaled from the limit on crowds to less than 100 people, but he maintained the requirement that names of participants be submitted to the police department beforehand, ostensibly to prevent felons from involvement. Subsequent meetings between Sabonjian and the NAACP proved more productive. By late September, they had agreed to build a recreation center in the area of the August unrest as well as start initiatives aimed at providing jobs for minority groups. Sabonjian's rhetoric, however, did not moderate. In October 1966, he referred to those involved in the riot as "animals."

== See also ==
- List of incidents of civil unrest in the United States
