= Genesee Theatre =

Building in Illinois, United States

Coordinates: 42.362603°N 87.83093°W

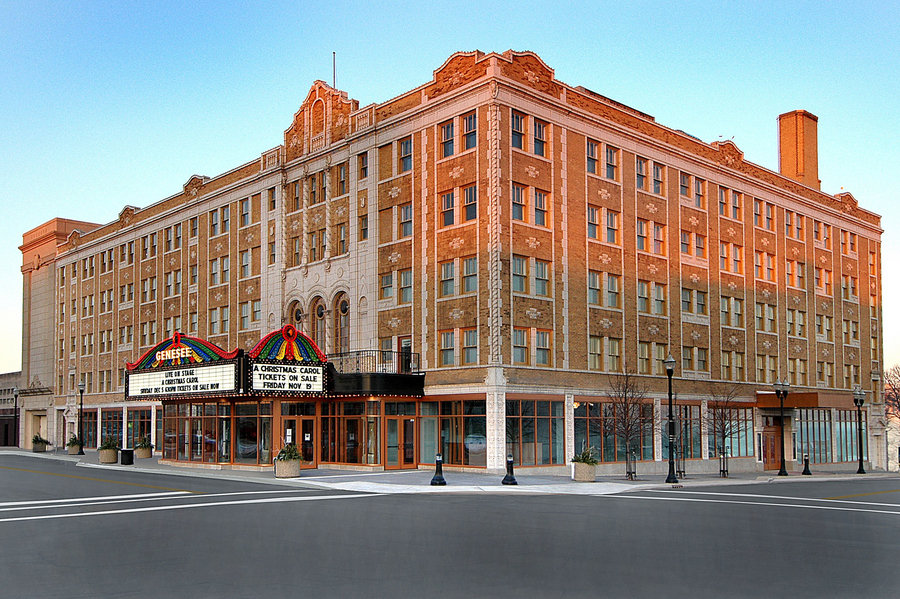
- The Genesee Theatre
- Interactive map of Genesee Theatre
- Location: Waukegan, Illinois
- Capacity: 2,403

Construction
- Opened: December 25, 1927
- Renovated: December 3, 2004
- Architect: Edward P. Steinberg

Website
- https://www.geneseetheatre.com/

Genesee Theatre is a concert hall and movie palace in Waukegan, Illinois. Today, the venue has seats for 2,403 people and opened in 1927. It's both used as a vaudeville theater and cinema and hosts musical artists and shows.

== History ==
In 1926, A.L. Brumund, H.C. Burnett, and D.T. Webb bought land at the corner of Genesee and Clayton Streets for $130,000. Their wish was to create a community center for Waukegan that provided high-quality entertainments as well as commercial and living spaces. After a year and a half and a million dollars later they had created a luxurious movie palace open to the public. Flourishing growth in this city north of Chicago, justified the building of a deluxe and luxurious movie theater that was unparalleled at the time throughout most of the country.

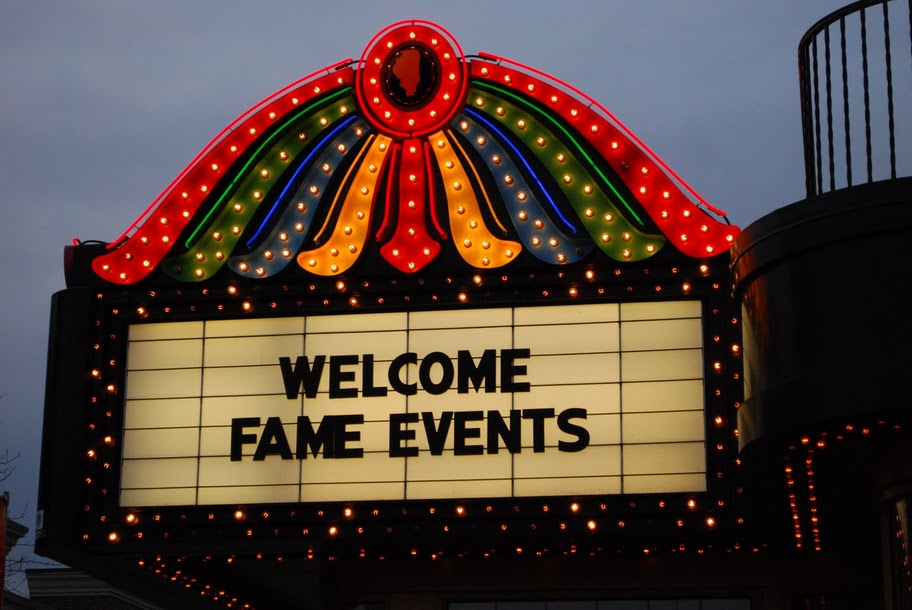
The Genesee Theatre sign today

The construction of the theatre began in September 1927. Waukegan contractor Alva Weeks and Chicago Architect Edward P. Steinberg were hired to construct the theatre. Steinberg had just built the BelPark and State theatres in Chicago, Illinois. No expense was spared in the construction of the theatre. The façade, on Genesee Street, was built from terracotta and pressed brick in ornate design. Inside the lobby hanged a luxurious chandelier. The interior is Spanish Renaissance style using Caen stone. A large dome in the center of the auditorium was made from hammered silver. Over 1200 yards of tapestry fabric, several tons of marble from the Carrera quarries in Italy, and lighting throughout the Theatre combine to make it the most lavish building in Waukegan.

It originally closed in 1989 but re-opened in 2004 following a $23 million renovation.

Soulja Boy shot part of his music video for "Donk", during a performance in the theatre.

Morrissey shot part of the video for his single "I'm Throwing My Arms Around Paris" during a 2007 performance at the theater.

Ringo Starr recorded a PBS special in this theater.
