= Waukegan Community Unit School District 60 =

School district in Illinois, United States

Address
- 1201 N Sheridan Rd Waukegan, Lake, Illinois, 60085; United States

District information
- Type: Public School District
- Motto: A New Day...A New Way in Waukegan Schools...students first!
- Grades: Pre-K–12th
- Established: 1856
- Superintendent: Theresa Plascencia
- Schools: 22
- Budget: US$ 100 (2016-2017)

Students and staff
- Students: 16,478 (2016-17)
- Teachers: 1,072 (2016-17)
- Student–teacher ratio: 23.3 (2016-17)

Other information
- Website: www.wps60.org

Waukegan Community Unit School District 60 (also known as Waukegan Public Schools or District 60, WCUSD) is in Waukegan, Illinois, and serves Waukegan, Park City, and parts of Beach Park. Total enrollment is approximately 16,000 in kindergarten through grade twelve. District 60 also provides pre-school and alternative education services.

Waukegan Public Schools is led by Superintendent Theresa Plascencia. Administrative offices are at the Lincoln Center for Education.

== History ==
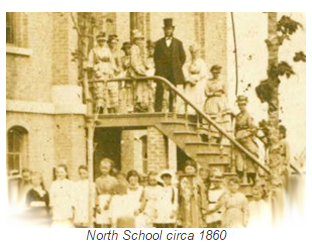
North School, the first school to be opened in 1860.

During the mid-1800s, the residents of Waukegan created a citywide school system. By 1856, North School opened, becoming the first and now oldest building in the District.

== Schools ==
District 60 operates 15 elementary schools, 5 middle schools, a high school (divided between two buildings), a kindergarten center, 1 pre-kindergarten site, and an alternative education center.

=== Elementary (K-5 and 1-5) ===
- Carman-Buckner Elementary School
- John S. Clark Elementary School
- Clearview Elementary School
- Andrew Cooke Magnet School
- Glen Flora Elementary School
- Glenwood Elementary School
- Greenwood Elementary School
- Hyde Park Elementary School
- Little Fort Elementary School
- Lyon Magnet School
- H. R. McCall Elementary School
- North Elementary School
- Oakdale Elementary School
- Washington Elementary School
- Whittier Elementary School

=== Middle Schools (6-8) ===
- Robert Abbott Middle School
- Jack Benny Middle School - named for comedian Jack Benny (1894-1974)
- John R Lewis Middle School-formerly ****Thomas Jefferson Middle School***
- Miguel Juarez Middle School - formerly East Middle School
- Edith M. Smith Middle School - formerly Daniel Webster Middle School

=== High School (9-12) ===
- Waukegan High School

=== Other Schools ===
- Alternative Optional Education Center
- EPIC Academy Preschool
- North Shore Preschool
- Shiloh Preschool

== 2014 Teachers Strike ==
On October 2, 2014, after months of negotiating between the WCUSD Teachers union and the School board, the teachers authorized a strike. At midnight October 2, the teachers were now on strike after failing to reach a deal. Schools were closed during the strike, which lasted one month; classes resumed on Monday, November 3.

== See also ==
- List of school districts in Illinois
