= John H. Conolly =

American politician (1935-1988)

Member of the Illinois House of Representatives

Personal details
- Born: June 4, 1935 Waukegan, Illinois
- Died: January 18, 1988 (aged 52)
- Party: Republican

John Hamilton Conolly (June 4, 1935 – January 18, 1988) was an American businessman and politician.

Born in Waukegan, Illinois, Conolly served in the United States Army. He went to the Lake Forest Academy and then received his bachelor's degree in economics from Michigan State University and worked for his family investment company. From 1963 to 1973, Conolly served in the Illinois House of Representatives and was a Republican. He then served in the Illinois Senate from 1973 to 1975. Conolly died while in an ambulance while going to a hospital in Chicago, Illinois.
