= William F. Durkin =

American politician (1929–2025)

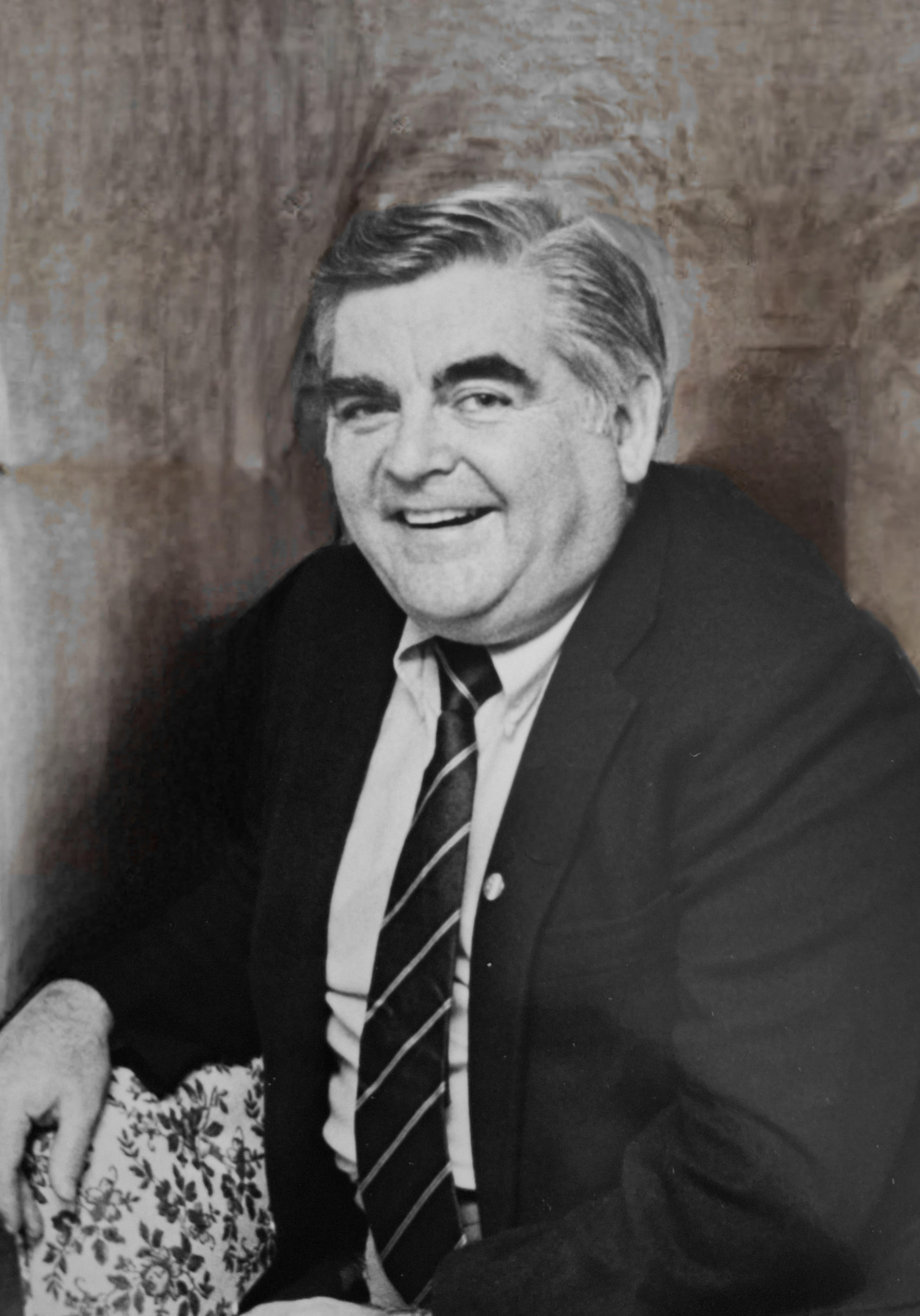
- Durkin in 1994
- Born: April 25, 1929; Waukegan, Illinois, U.S.
- Died: March 13, 2025 (aged 95); Zion, Illinois, U.S.
- Occupations: Politician, businessman
- Spouse: Virginia Kelly (m. 1952–2022, her death)
- Children: 4

William F. Durkin (April 25, 1929 – March 13, 2025) was an American politician and businessman who served as the mayor of Waukegan, Illinois, from 1993 to 2001 and as the city's clerk from 1980 to 1993. Known for his deep commitment to public service and community engagement, Durkin was remembered for his "deeply inspired vision of what Waukegan could be."

== Early life and education ==
Durkin was born on April 25, 1929, in Waukegan, Illinois. He attended Immaculate Conception School and graduated from Waukegan Township High School. He later studied at the University of Notre Dame. During the Korean War, Durkin served in the U.S. Army's 2nd Division Artillery before returning to his hometown.

== Career ==
After his military service, Durkin joined his father and brother in running Durkin & Durkin, a family-owned men's clothing store with locations in Waukegan, Fox Lake, and Wisconsin. The business operated for 75 years until its closure in 1980, when Durkin transitioned into public service.

In 1980, Durkin was elected Waukegan city clerk on a ticket with mayoral candidate Bill Morris, serving three terms until 1993. He then ran for and won the office of mayor in 1993, serving two terms until 2001. As mayor, Durkin was noted for his ability to build coalitions and work collaboratively, even with those he disagreed with. Former Waukegan Mayor Wayne Motley praised Durkin’s political skill, stating, "He never took criticism personally. He was able to work well with people he had disagreements with."

Durkin’s tenure as mayor included efforts to improve the city, drawing on his people skills honed as a businessman. His daughter, Mary Ellen Vanderventer, recalled how he gave his phone number to everyone he met and returned every call, reflecting his approachable and dedicated nature.

== Personal life and death ==
On November 8, 1952, Durkin married Virginia Kelly at St. Anastasia Catholic Church in Waukegan. The couple remained married for 70 years until her death in 2022. They had four children: Mary Ellen Vanderventer, Bill Durkin, Carol Wolf, and Joan Westphal. Two of his children followed in his footsteps with political careers—Vanderventer served as Lake County recorder from 1996 to 2022, and Bill Durkin was a Lake County Board member from 2010 to 2022.

Durkin was also known for his community involvement, including dressing as Santa Claus each Christmas to deliver gifts to neighborhood children. He remained a lifelong resident of Waukegan.

Durkin died at Allure Nursing Home in Zion, Illinois, on March 13, 2025, at the age of 95. His funeral was held on March 18, 2025, at St. Anastasia Catholic Church in Waukegan.

== Legacy ==
Durkin was remembered as a gentle and trustworthy leader who prioritized service to others. David Motley, Waukegan’s director of public relations, credited Durkin with giving him his start in city government, noting his thoughtful and personable demeanor. Since his second term as mayor ended in 2001, no Waukegan mayor has been reelected, underscoring his unique impact on the city.

== See also ==
- List of mayors of Waukegan, Illinois
