= Waukegan High School =

Location
- 2325 Brookside Avenue; Waukegan, Illinois 60085; United States; 42.3638°N 87.8651°W (Brookside); 42.35855°N 87.844148°W (Washington)

Information
- School type: Public
- Opened: 1870
- School district: Waukegan Community Unit School District 60
- Superintendent: Theresa Plascencia
- Principal: Timothy Bryner
- Teaching staff: 304.00 (FTE)
- Grades: 9–12
- Gender: coed
- Enrollment: 4,325 (2023–2024)
- Average class size: 20.4
- Student to teacher ratio: 14.23
- Campus: Suburban
- Colors: Purple, Kelly green and gold
- Song: The Purple, Green And Gold
- Fight song: The Purple, Green And Gold
- Athletics conference: North Suburban Conference
- Mascot: Bulldog
- Nickname: Bulldogs
- Team name: Waukegan Bulldogs
- Accreditation: AdvancED
- Newspaper: The Dog Times
- Website: whs.wps60.org/o/whs

Waukegan High School, or WHS, is a public four-year high school located in Waukegan, Illinois, United States, a city to the north of Chicago, Illinois. It is part of Waukegan Community Unit School District 60. Students attend classes at the Washington Campus (EAST Campus), located at 1011 Washington Street, and also at the Brookside Campus (WEST Campus), at 2325 Brookside Avenue.

== History ==
Waukegan High School has been in operation for over 150 years, though the name and buildings used have changed as the town grew.

=== Early years ===
WHS was established in 1870, with classes held inside the pre-existing 1868 Waukegan Central School; the first high school class graduated in 1874. That building and all teaching materials inside were destroyed by a fire one evening in early January 1889; a new building soon replaced it with the same name.

=== WTHS era ===
Due to continuing population growth and the mid-1905 mission change from a city school to one serving the entire civil township, additional space was soon needed. A building that would become known as the 'Senior School' was constructed between 1908 and 1910; the complementary 'Junior School' was opened at the corner of Washington and Jackson in 1921. These buildings were the initial elements of the aforementioned Washington Campus.

From July 1905 until the construction of the Brookside Campus, it was known as the Waukegan Township High School (WTHS).

=== Post-war changes ===
The Brookside Campus was built to accommodate the baby boomer generation after WWII and opened in 1974. Brookside Campus originally held the Freshmen and Sophomore classes, while Washington Campus housed the Junior and Senior classes. Between the 1975–76 school year and the 1989–90 school year, Waukegan High School split into two completely separate campuses. The East (Washington) campus is considered to be one and the same as the current and previous Waukegan High School. The West (Brookside) Campus was, during those years, a separate high school known as Waukegan West. After 1990, the two campuses combined, with Washington Campus becoming a 9th grade center, while Brookside Campus became a 10th–12th grade center. One small development of the two schools combining was the new mascot, a bulldog with an eye patch. The eye patch is an homage to Waukegan West's mascot: a raider.

=== 21st Century ===
After the 2009 school year, a new program called "Houses" was created, with the goals of creating smaller learning environments for the student body and allowing for those students to learn with like-minded people. All even-numbered houses up to eight were located at Washington Campus, while all odd-numbered houses up to seven were located at Brookside Campus. Each house had its own principal, dean, secretary, and several counselors. The program ended by the 2017–2018 school year, and instead, a change was opted where Brookside Campus became a 9th–10th grade learning center, while Washington Campus became an 11th–12th grade learning center.

Today, it is one of the largest high schools in the United States.

== Demographics ==
According to the Illinois School Report Card for 2018, the demographics are as follow: 79.2% Hispanic, 13% Black, 3.5% White, 1.6% Asian, 1.7% Two or More Races, 0.8% American Indian, and 0.2% Pacific Islander.

== Feeder Schools ==
=== Public schools ===
Name of feeder school	Name of feeder school's school district
Edith M. Smith Middle School	Waukegan Community Unit School District 60
Jack Benny Middle School	Waukegan Community Unit School District 60
Miguel Juarez Middle School	Waukegan Community Unit School District 60
Robert E. Abbott Middle School	Waukegan Community Unit School District 60
John Lewis Middle School	Waukegan Community Unit School District 60

== Athletics ==
The Waukegan Bulldogs are members of the North Suburban Conference. They also compete as a part of the Illinois High School Association (IHSA), which sponsors the state tournaments for most of the sports and activities in the state.

During the time when Waukegan High School was split into Waukegan East and Waukegan West High Schools, East retained the "Bulldog" nickname that had been in use, while the West school took the name "Raiders". When the schools merged again, the traditional Bulldog name was retained. However, a pirate's eye patch was added to depictions of the bulldog to honor the "Raiders" legacy of the West campus.

Waukegan sponsors the following interscholastic athletic teams for men and women:

- Badminton
- Baseball
- Basketball
- Bowling
- Cheerleading
- Cross Country
- Football
- Golf
- Soccer
- Softball
- Swimming
- Tennis
- Track and Field
- Volleyball
- Wrestling

While not sponsored by the IHSA, the school also sponsors teams in pom poms for women, and coed teams in drill team and rifle team.

The following teams have finished in the top four of their respective state championship tournaments, sponsored by the IHSA:

- Baseball: 2nd place (1959–60); State Champions (1970–71, 1982–83)
- Basketball (boys): 4th place (1958–59); 2nd place (2008–09); 3rd place (2009–10)
- Cross Country (boys): 3rd place (1993–94)
- Golf (boys): 4th place (1939–40); 3rd place (1957–58); 2nd place (1953–54, 1962–63, 1963–64, 1969–70)
- Golf (girls): 4th place (1976–77, 1977–78, 1983–84); 3rd place (1992–93); 2nd place (1981–82); State Champions (1975–76, 1980–81, 1991–92)
- Track & Field (boys): 4th place (1926–27); 3rd place (1982–83, 1989–90); 2nd place (1953–54); State Champions (1979–80)
- Track & Field (girls): 3rd place (1994–95); 2nd place (1995–96)
- Wrestling: 4th place (1953–54, 1960–61, 1991–92, 1993–94, 2000–01); 3rd place (1956–57, 1958–59, 1959–60, 1964–65, 1969–70, 1971–72, 1981–82); 2nd place (1950–51, 1951–52, 1961–62, 1990–91); State Champions (1957–58, 1962–63, 1963–64, 1965–66)

The 1982–83 baseball state title, the 1983–84 4th-place finish in girls golf, and the 1989–90 3rd-place finish in boys track & field were won by Waukegan West High School. The IHSA recognizes the current Waukegan High School as the caretaker of these victories.

== The Purple, The Green, The Gold (Fight Song) ==
Also known as the School Song, or Purple, Green, and Gold, it was originally composed by Otto E. Graham in 1959.

== Notable alumni ==
- Paul Adams was an Illinois Fighting Illini football player and long-time coach at Deerfield High School.
- Robert Barnett was a lawyer whose clients have included Bill Clinton, Hillary Clinton, and Barack Obama.
- Gary Bennett (class of 1990) was a Major League Baseball catcher (1995–2008). He was a member of the 2006 World Series Champion St. Louis Cardinals.
- Jack Benny (did not graduate) was a vaudevillian, comedian, and star of radio, film, and television from the 1920s through the 1960s.
- Jim Bittermann has been a news reporter based in Europe since 1980 for NBC, ABC, and most recently CNN.
- Nick Browder was a quarterback in the Arena Football League.
- Corky Calhoun was a professional basketball player (1972–80), member of 1977 NBA Champion Portland Trail Blazers.
- Sam Cunningham, mayor of Waukegan (2017–2021)
- Betty Currie was the personal secretary for President Bill Clinton, best known for her testimony in the Monica Lewinsky affair.
- Johnny Dickshot was a Major League Baseball player (Pittsburgh Pirates, New York Giants, Chicago White Sox).
- William F. Durkin, mayor of Waukegan (1993–2001)
- Neil Flynn is an actor who starred in Scrubs and The Middle
- Otto Graham was a professional football player (1946–55), playing his entire career as quarterback for the Cleveland Browns; he is a member of the Pro Football Hall of Fame.
- Charles Kupperman (class of 1968), Deputy U.S. National Security Advisor.
- Jermaine Lewis was a professional football player in the Arena Football League.
- Rashaan Melvin (class of 2008) is a former cornerback for the NFL's Carolina Panthers
- Bob O'Farrell was a Major League Baseball catcher (1915–35), voted the National League's 1926 Most Valuable Player and played for the 1926 World Series champion St. Louis Cardinals.
- David Ogrin is a professional golfer.
- Jerry Orbach was an actor noted for roles on stage, television, and film; won a Tony Award for his work on Broadway and starred in the NBC television series Law & Order.
- Adam Pearce (class of 1996) was a World Champion and Hall of Fame professional wrestler, currently serving as WWE's resident on-screen official.
- Jereme Richmond (class of 2010), basketball player for University of Illinois, declared for NBA draft in 2011.
- Brian Traxler is a former MLB player (Los Angeles Dodgers).
- Jerome Whitehead was a professional basketball player in the NBA (1978–89); member of the national champion 1976-77 Marquette Warriors men's basketball team.
