= Bill Morris (Illinois politician) =

American politician

Mayor of Waukegan, Illinois
- In office May 1977 – May 1985
- Preceded by: Robert Sabonjian
- Succeeded by: Robert Sabonjian

Member of the Illinois Senate from the 31st district
- In office January 1975 – May 1977
- Preceded by: John H. Conolly
- Succeeded by: Larry Leonard

Personal details
- Party: Democratic
- Spouse: Sue
- Children: 2
- Education: Northern Illinois University

Bill Morris is a politician from Illinois who served as a Democratic member of the Illinois Senate and as Mayor of Waukegan, Illinois. He is a graduate of Marmion Academy and Northern Illinois University. In 1974, he defeated incumbent Republican John H. Conolly that saw the Democratic Party win a majority of seats in the Illinois Senate for the first time in over a decade. While in the Senate, he was a member of the "Crazy 8," a group of reform-minded Democrats, and an opponent of the Regional Transportation Authority.

In 1977, he ran for Mayor of Waukegan, defeating incumbent Robert Sabonjian, who would defeat his efforts for a third term in 1985. Larry Leonard, a fellow newscaster and Democratic precinct committeeman, was appointed to succeed Morris. Leonard lost his election bid to Adeline Geo-Karis. After leaving the Mayor's office, he has served as a member of the Illinois State Toll Highway Authority and the Illinois Liquor Control Commission.

== See also ==
- List of mayors of Waukegan, Illinois
