= Waukegan Harbor Light =

Lighthouse in Illinois, United States

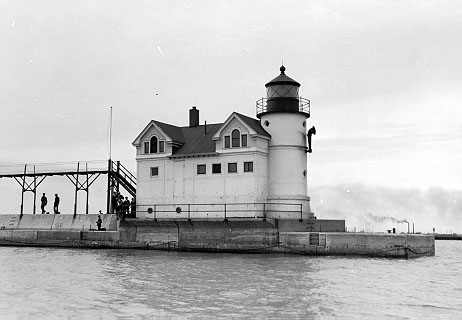
- After the pier extension and before the fire
- Location: Waukegan, Illinois
- Coordinates: 42°21′38.5″N 87°48′48.3″W

Tower
- Constructed: 1889
- Foundation: Breakwater
- Construction: Iron
- Height: 35 feet (11 m)
- Shape: Cylindrical
- Markings: White with green band, no lantern
- Fog signal: Horn: 2 every 30s

Light
- First lit: relocated 1905
- Focal height: 36 feet (11 m)
- Range: 14 nautical miles (26 km; 16 mi)
- Characteristic: Occulting green, 4s

Waukegan Harbor Light is a lighthouse at the end of Government Pier at the foot of Madison Street in Waukegan, Illinois. It was first built in 1889 and moved when the pier was extended in the early twentieth century. At that time a fog signal building was added to the tower.

There was a serious fire in 1967. While the cast iron tower was undamaged, the rest of the structure, the light, and the fog signal were destroyed. The lantern and the remains of the fog signal house were removed so that it now looks the same as it did before the pier was extended. It remains an active light, owned and maintained by the US Coast Guard.
