= Sam Cunningham (mayor) =

American politician

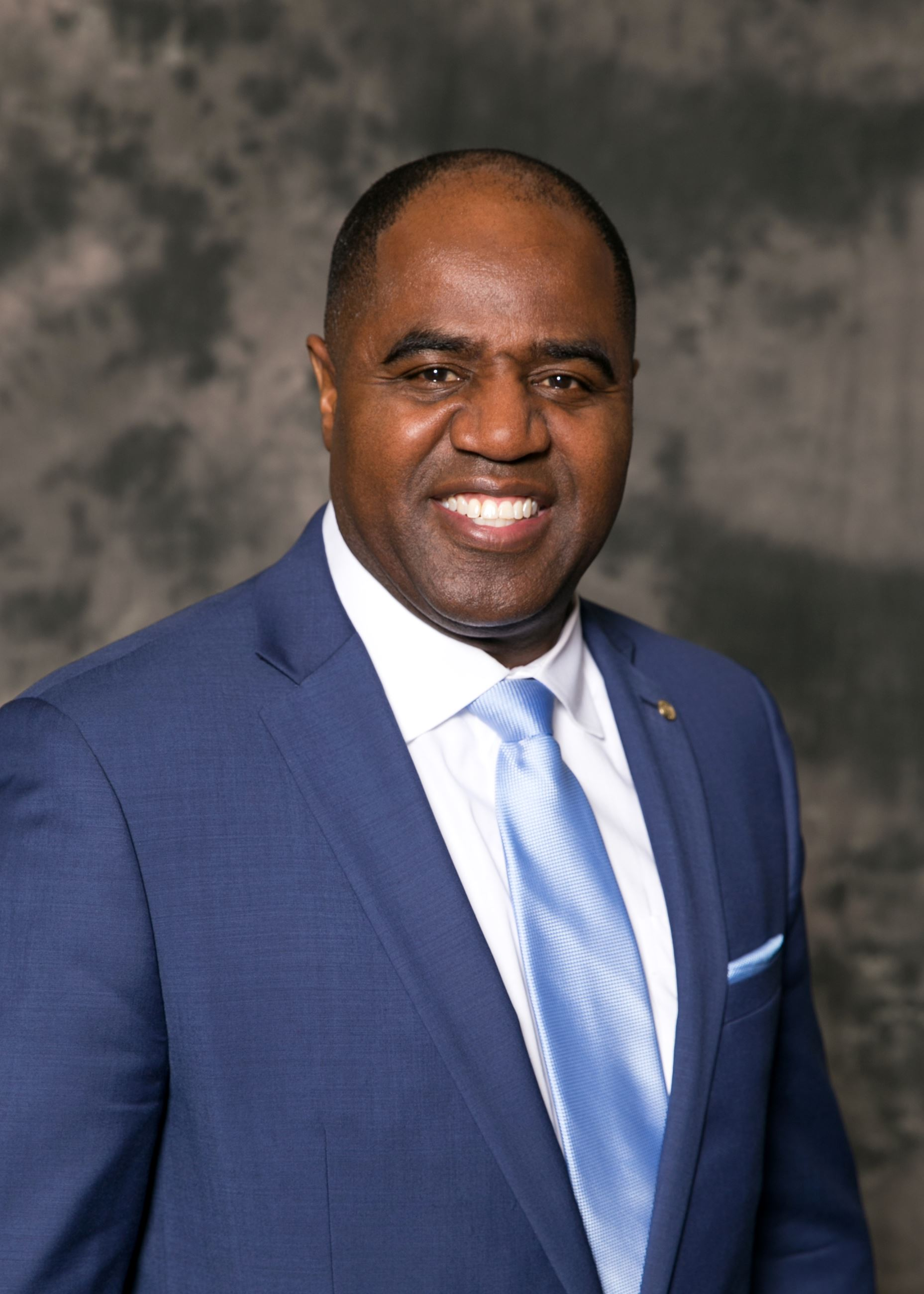
- Official Photo of the Mayor

40th Mayor of Waukegan
- In office May 1, 2017 – May 3, 2021
- Preceded by: Wayne Motley
- Succeeded by: Ann B. Taylor

Waukegan City Council
- In office May 3, 1999 – May 1, 2017

Personal details
- Born: Waukegan, Illinois
- Party: Democratic
- Education: B.S. Central State University

Sam Cunningham is an American politician who was elected as the first African-American mayor of Waukegan, Illinois, the largest city and county seat of Lake County, Illinois in 2017. After a 2021 loss to Ann B. Taylor, Cunningham was reelected to serve a second, nonconsecutive term in 2025.

== Biography ==
Cunningham was born and raised in Waukegan and lived in public housing. He is a graduate of Waukegan East High School and Central State University where he earned a B.S. in Business Administration and Marketing. After college, he established his own business as an insurance agent. In 1975, he joined the Waukegan Police Department as an officer. In 1999, he was elected as alderman for the 1st Ward in Waukegan. In 2017, he defeated independent Lisa May, who at the time would have been the city's first female mayor. He was the first African American to serve as mayor in Waukegan.

== Tenure as mayor ==
Early in Cunningham's first term, he began large scale development projects that would be impeded by the ensuing COVID-19 emergency of 2020. He updated Waukegan's master development plan after nearly 40 years, created a capital improvement plan and proposed the development of a casino on the former location of Lakehurst Mall. In 2019, with the signing of the Rebuild Illinois Act by governor J. B. Pritzker, six new casinos were to be constructed, including one in Waukegan. Although legal challenges prevented the awarding of a casino contract during Cunningham's first term, in January 2025 the Illinois Supreme Court struck down the challenge, allowing his initial plan to move forward, with the permanent casino slated for completion by 2027.

Another vision he had for the city was the transformation of the lakefront harbor into the "northern Navy Pier" of Lake County. Lakefront development has been attempted with mixed success by many administrations, with the primary barriers to progress being a railroad that held legal right-of-way and the difficulties of intensive environmental cleanup after decades of industrial use. Cunningham's version included the establishment of the harbor and iconic "Government Pier" as an entertainment center and public open-space supported by surrounding housing developments. The development of the low-lying lakefront would be physically connected to the downtown area higher up on the bluff, which would also be further developed with commercial space, housing and cultural districts. Critics of this objected to it, as they claimed the city did not have sufficient funds to accomplish this goal.

In April 2019, Sam Cunningham and his mother, Lake County Board vice-chair Mary Ross Cunningham, were sued for allegedly violating the First Amendment rights of a Waukegan resident. The mayor allegedly threatened to revoke the resident's public housing voucher and potentially arrest the resident if he did not remove an altered image that depicted the two as devils. The lawsuit settled for $17,000, with the county paying $12,000 and the city paying $5,000.

== Personal life ==
Cunningham has two daughters, Syerra and Samantha. Cunningham is a 2017 Jim Edgar Fellow, the U.S. Minority Contractors Association 2017 Municipal Administrator of the Year, and the recipient of the Illinois Black Chamber of Commerce Parren J. Mitchell Outstanding Service Award. He is a member of Kappa Alpha Psi.

== See also ==
- List of mayors of Waukegan, Illinois
- List of first African-American mayors
