= Waukegan, Illinois =

- City
- City of Waukegan
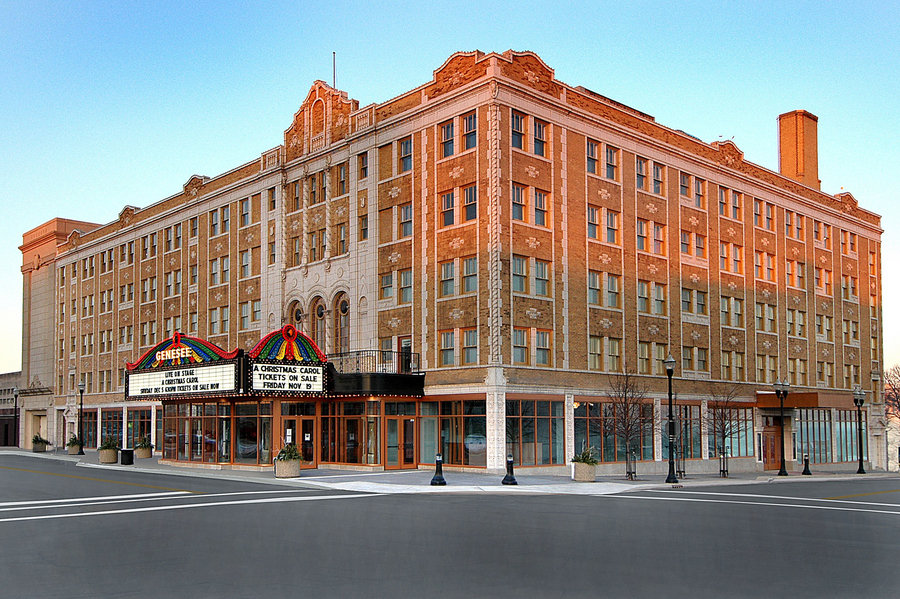
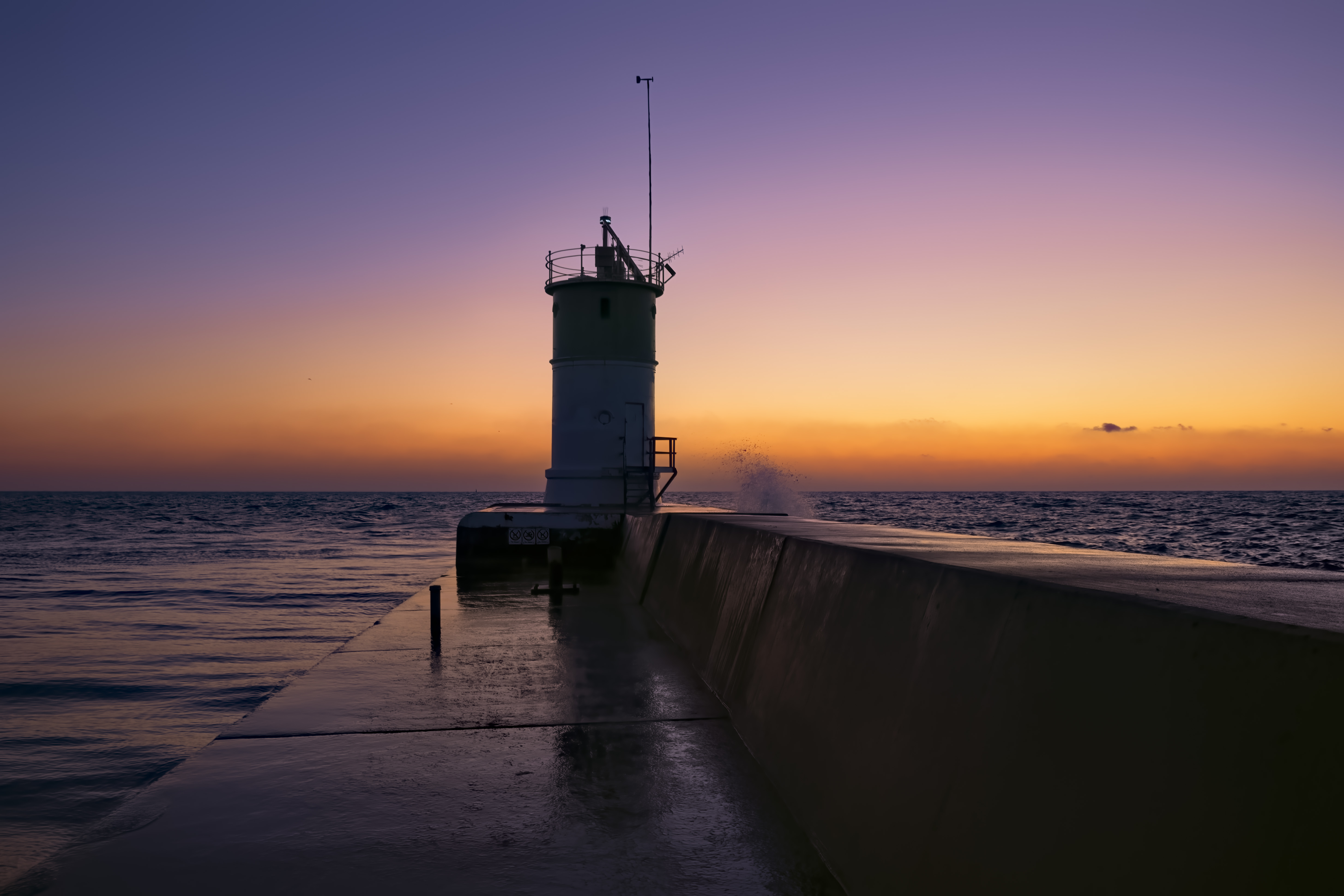
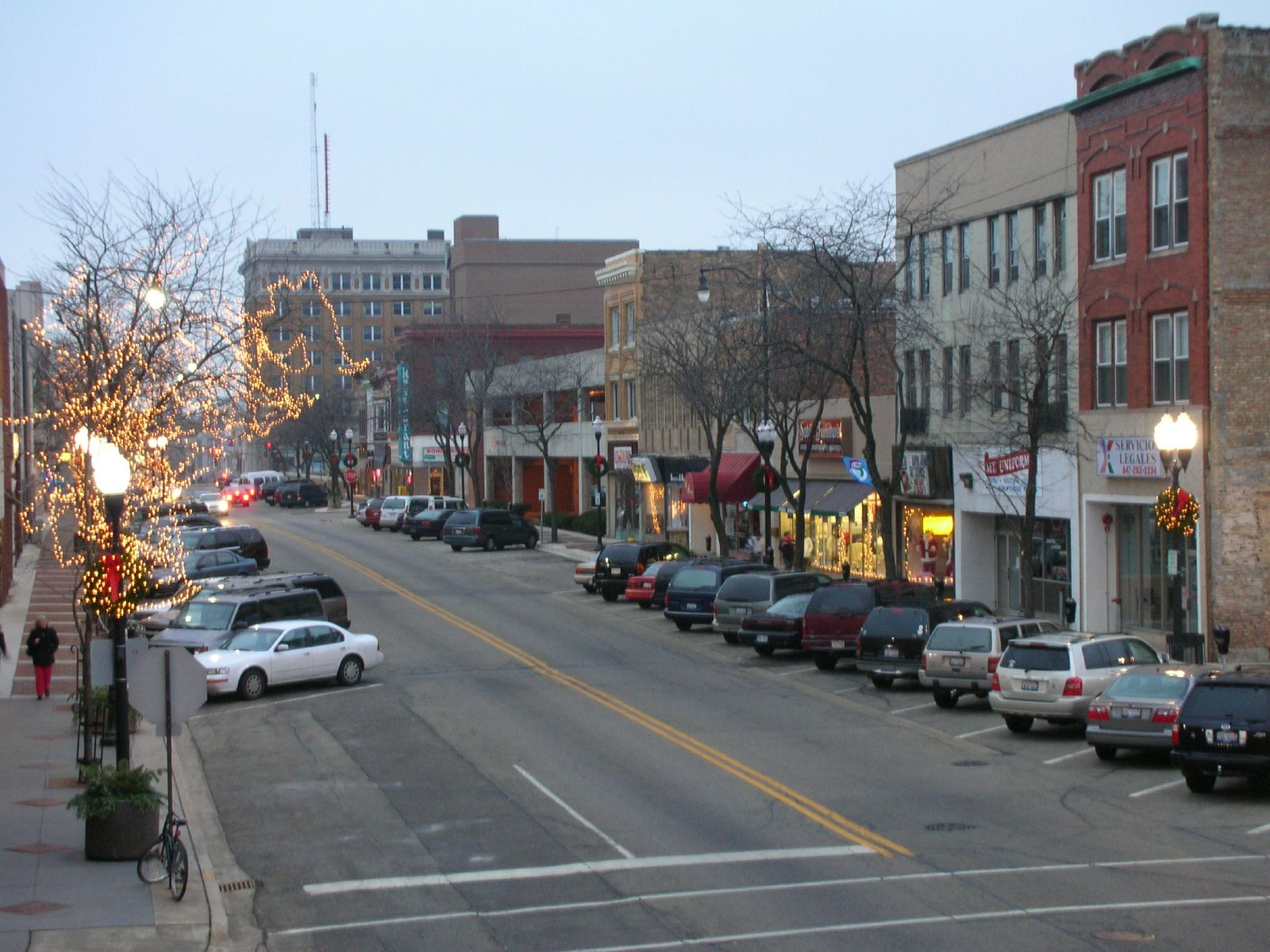
- Genesee Theatre Waukegan Harbor Lighthouse Genesee Street

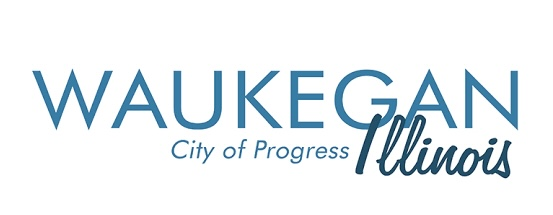
- Flag Seal Wordmark
- Nicknames: WaukTown, Green Town
- Motto: An Illinois Arts-Friendly Community
- Interactive map of Waukegan, Illinois
- Location within Illinois Location within the United States
- Coordinates: 42°22′13″N 87°52′16″W
- Country: United States
- State: Illinois
- Counties: Lake
- Townships: Waukegan, Warren, Libertyville, Benton, Newport, Shields
- Founded: 1829
- Incorporated (town): March 31, 1849
- Incorporated (city): February 23, 1859
- Named for: Potawatomi: Wakaigin (Fortress or Trading Post)

Government
  - Type: Mayor–council
  - Mayor: Samuel D. Cunningham, Jr (D)

Area
  - City: 24.47 sq mi (63.38 km^{2})
  - Land: 24.22 sq mi (62.72 km^{2})
  - Water: 0.25 sq mi (0.66 km^{2})
- Elevation: 715 ft (218 m)

Population (2020)
  - City: 89,321
  - Estimate (2024): 88,570 ▼
  - Rank: 10th largest in Illinois; 390th largest in U.S.
  - Density: 3,688.3/sq mi (1,424.06/km^{2})
  - Metro: 9,472,676
- Demonym: Waukeganite
- Time zone: UTC−6 (CST)
  - Summer (DST): UTC−5 (CDT)
- ZIP Codes: 60079, 60085, 60087
- Area codes: 847 & 224
- FIPS code: 17-79293
- GNIS feature ID: 2397222
- Waterways: Waukegan River
- Airports: Waukegan National Airport
- Website: www.waukeganil.gov

Waukegan (/wəˈkiːɡən/ wə-KEE-ghən) is a city in Lake County, Illinois, United States, and its county seat. Located 36 miles (58 km) north of Chicago, Waukegan is a satellite city within the greater Chicago metropolitan area. Its population was 89,321 at the 2020 census.

Waukegan is the most populous city in Lake County, the seventh-most populous city within the Chicago metropolitan area, and the 10th-most populous city in Illinois. Waukegan has historically been more industrial in comparison to neighboring wealthy North Shore suburbs; it has long been classified by the Illinois state government as "socioeconomically distressed" despite having some middle class inhabitants.

== History ==
=== Founding and 19th century ===
The site of present-day Waukegan was recorded as Rivière du Vieux Fort ("Old Fort River") and Wakaygagh on a 1778 map by Thomas Hutchins. By the 1820s, the French name had become "Small Fort River" in English, and the settlement was known as "Little Fort". The name "Waukegance" and then "Waukegan" (meaning "little fort"; cf. Potawatomi wakaigin "fort" or "fortress") was created by John H. Kinzie and Solomon Juneau, and the new name was adopted on March 31, 1849.

Waukegan had an abolitionist community dating to these early days. In 1853, residents commemorated the anniversary of emancipation of slaves in the British Empire with a meeting. Waukegan arguably has the distinction of being the only place where Abraham Lincoln failed to finish a speech. When he was campaigning in the town in 1860, he was interrupted by a ringing fire alarm.

During the middle of the 19th century, Waukegan was becoming an important industrial hub. Industries included ship and wagon building, flour milling, sheep raising, pork packing, and dairying. William Besley's Waukegan Brewing Company was one of the most successful of these businesses, being able to sell beyond America. The construction of the Chicago and Milwaukee Railway through Waukegan by 1855 stimulated the growth and rapid transformation and development of the city's industry, so much that nearly 1000 ships were visiting Waukegan harbor every year. During the 1860s, a substantial German population began to grow inside the city.

Waukegan's development began in many ways with the arrival of industries such as United States Sugar Refinery, which opened in 1890, Washburn & Moen. This barbed-wire manufacturer prompted both labor migration and land speculation beginning in 1891, U.S. Starch Works, and Thomas Brass and Iron Works. Immigrants followed, mostly from southeastern Europe and Scandinavia, with large groups from Sweden, Finland, and Lithuania. The town also became home to a considerable Armenian population. One member of this community, Monoog Curezhin, even became embroiled in an aborted plot to assassinate Sultan Abdul Hamid II, reviled for his involvement in massacres of Armenians in the Ottoman Empire. Curezhin lost two fingers on his right hand while testing explosives for this purpose in Waukegan in 1904.

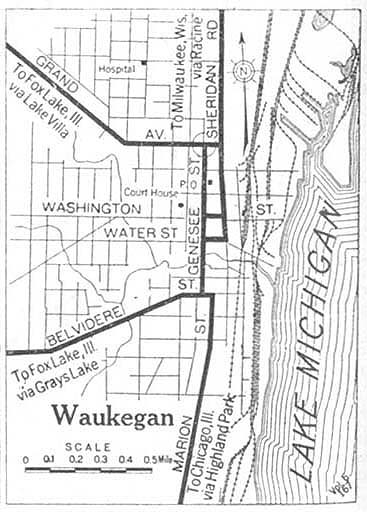
A map of Waukegan in 1920

=== 20th century ===
By the 1920s and 1930s, blacks began to migrate to the city, mostly from the South. The town was afflicted with racial strife. In June 1920, a black boy allegedly hit the car of an off-duty sailor from nearby Great Lakes Naval Base with a rock, and hundreds of white sailors gathered at Sherman House, a hotel reserved for blacks. Although newspaper reports and rumors suggested that the officer's wife was hit with glass from the broken windshield, subsequent reports revealed that the officer was not married. The sailors called for lynchings, but were kept back by the intervention of the police.

Marines and sailors renewed their attack on the hotel several days later. The Sherman House residents fled for their lives as the military members carried torches, gasoline, and the American flag. The Waukegan police once again turned them away, but not before firing and wounding two members of the crowd. The police were not always so willing to protect Waukegan's citizens. The chief of police and the state's attorney in the 1920s, for example, were avowed members of the Ku Klux Klan, facts that came to light when a wrongfully convicted black war veteran was released from prison on appeal after 25 years. Labor unrest also occurred regularly. In 1919, a strike at the US Steel and Wire Company – which had acquired Washburn & Moen – led to a call for intervention from the state militia.

Noted organized crime boss Johnny Torrio served time in Waukegan's Lake County jail in 1925. He installed bulletproof covers on the windows of his cell at his own expense for fear of assassination attempts.

The Johns-Manville Corporation in 1923 opened a large asbestos plant, which was in operation until 1998.

The Waukegan urban area developed independently of Chicago before being officially incorporated into the Chicago metropolitan area during the 2000 census. This inclusion took place as a result of suburban sprawl, effectively dissolving the region's identity as self-standing. Despite this, Waukegan has retained a distinct industrial character in contrast to many of the residential suburbs along Chicago's North Shore. The financial disparity created by the disappearance of manufacturing from the city in part contributed to the Waukegan riot of 1966. Central to this event and the remainder of Waukegan's 20th-century history was Robert Sabonjian, who served as mayor for 24 years, and earned the nickname the "Mayor Daley of Waukegan" for his personal and sometimes controversial style of politics.

=== 21st century ===
On Sunday, May 31, 2020, a peaceful protest against the murder of George Floyd by police in Minneapolis turned violent when a portion of the protesters looted and damaged local businesses along Lewis Avenue from Glen Flora Street north into the Village of Beach Park. According to local activist Ralph Peterson, who organized the earlier peaceful march moving east along Grand Avenue into the downtown area, two intoxicated locals and about five "professional provocateurs" not recognized by attendees attempted to incite to violence 50-75 protesters gathered at the corner of Glen Flora and North Lewis Avenue. Following the arrival of police, Peterson and Clyde McLemore, founder of the Lake County chapter of Black Lives Matter, attempted to disperse the crowd and diffuse police confrontations. Many in the dispersed and agitated crowd then began damaging and looting local businesses near Waukegan Plaza, as well as confronting arriving police with displays of violence and damage to police vehicles. The crowd size was then estimated to have grown to several hundred.

Businesses from Glen Flora Avenue north to Yorkhouse Road in Beach Park suffered looting of merchandise, property damage, and vandalism. In addition to the Waukegan Police Department, about 100 officers from neighboring departments and several dozen sheriff's deputies were dispatched to the area. Mayor Sam Cunningham issued a city-wide curfew. Five county squad cars were damaged during the confrontations, and over twenty people were arrested with no injuries reported. Upon finding that the vast majority of rioters were Waukegan residents, Cunningham stated, "That really hurts, that you would hurt your own block, your own store, your own business, your own neighborhood, city." The next day, local business owners and volunteers gathered to clean up the damage. Later on Monday, another protest was held at Waukegan Plaza, which was peaceful and caused no damage. On Tuesday, local faith leaders organized a vigil to denounce looting as counterproductive while demanding justice for the murder of George Floyd. At least one attendee and long-time resident was also present at the 1966 Waukegan Riot and expressed regret that it had occurred again.

== Geography ==
Waukegan is on the shore of Lake Michigan, about 11 miles (18 km) south of the border with Wisconsin and 37 miles (60 km) north of downtown Chicago at an elevation around 650 feet (200 m) above sea level. Chicago has two major streets that venture north to Waukegan, one being Sheridan Road, which extends north from Diversey Parkway in Lincoln Park. The second street is Milwaukee Avenue, which starts at the intersection of Desplaines Street and Kinzie Street in downtown Chicago.

According to the 2021 census gazetteer files, Waukegan has a total area of 24.48 square miles (63.40 km^{2}), of which 24.23 square miles (62.76 km^{2}) (or 98.99%) is land and 0.25 square miles (0.65 km^{2}) (or 1.01%) is water.

=== Climate ===
Waukegan is located within the humid continental climate zone (Köppen: Dfa) with warm to hot (and often humid) summers and cold and snowy winters. The record high temperature is 108 °F (42 °C), which was set in July 1934, while the record low is −27 °F (−33 °C), set in January 1985. Waukegan's proximity to Lake Michigan moderates the climate, cooling it in the summer and warming it in the winter.

Climate data for Waukegan, IL (1981–2010 normals)
| Month | Jan | Feb | Mar | Apr | May | Jun | Jul | Aug | Sep | Oct | Nov | Dec | Year |
|---|---|---|---|---|---|---|---|---|---|---|---|---|---|
| Record high °F (°C) | 64 (18) | 71 (22) | 83 (28) | 92 (33) | 95 (35) | 105 (41) | 108 (42) | 102 (39) | 103 (39) | 90 (32) | 80 (27) | 69 (21) | 108 (42) |
| Mean maximum °F (°C) | 48 (9) | 51 (11) | 67 (19) | 80 (27) | 86 (30) | 92 (33) | 95 (35) | 93 (34) | 90 (32) | 81 (27) | 67 (19) | 53 (12) | 96 (36) |
| Mean daily maximum °F (°C) | 29.9 (−1.2) | 34.1 (1.2) | 44.0 (6.7) | 55.9 (13.3) | 66.5 (19.2) | 77.0 (25.0) | 81.4 (27.4) | 80.0 (26.7) | 73.0 (22.8) | 61.0 (16.1) | 47.5 (8.6) | 34.2 (1.2) | 57.0 (13.9) |
| Daily mean °F (°C) | 22.5 (−5.3) | 26.5 (−3.1) | 35.9 (2.2) | 46.9 (8.3) | 56.8 (13.8) | 67.0 (19.4) | 72.3 (22.4) | 71.3 (21.8) | 63.4 (17.4) | 51.6 (10.9) | 39.8 (4.3) | 27.3 (−2.6) | 48.4 (9.1) |
| Mean daily minimum °F (°C) | 15.1 (−9.4) | 18.9 (−7.3) | 27.8 (−2.3) | 37.8 (3.2) | 47.0 (8.3) | 57.1 (13.9) | 63.2 (17.3) | 62.7 (17.1) | 53.8 (12.1) | 42.3 (5.7) | 32.1 (0.1) | 20.4 (−6.4) | 39.9 (4.4) |
| Mean minimum °F (°C) | −9 (−23) | −3 (−19) | 8 (−13) | 23 (−5) | 32 (0) | 42 (6) | 49 (9) | 49 (9) | 38 (3) | 27 (−3) | 13 (−11) | −2 (−19) | −12 (−24) |
| Record low °F (°C) | −27 (−33) | −24 (−31) | −12 (−24) | 8 (−13) | 24 (−4) | 32 (0) | 41 (5) | 40 (4) | 27 (−3) | 11 (−12) | −5 (−21) | −23 (−31) | −27 (−33) |
| Average precipitation inches (mm) | 1.69 (43) | 1.31 (33) | 2.25 (57) | 3.37 (86) | 3.37 (86) | 3.79 (96) | 3.29 (84) | 3.51 (89) | 3.43 (87) | 2.51 (64) | 2.43 (62) | 1.82 (46) | 32.31 (821) |
| Average snowfall inches (cm) | 10.8 (27) | 8.4 (21) | 6.4 (16) | 1.4 (3.6) | 0.0 (0.0) | 0.0 (0.0) | 0.0 (0.0) | 0.0 (0.0) | 0.0 (0.0) | 0.1 (0.25) | 2.0 (5.1) | 8.4 (21) | 36.4 (92) |

=== Superfund sites ===
Waukegan Harbor, with OMC (purple), WCP (red), and Johns-Manville (yellow) Superfund sites

Waukegan contains three Superfund sites of hazardous substances that are on the National Priorities List.

In 1975, PCBs were discovered in Waukegan Harbor sediments. Investigation revealed that during manufacturing activities at Outboard Marine Corporation (OMC), hydraulic fluids containing PCBs had been discharged through floor drains at the OMC plant, directly to Waukegan Harbor and into ditches discharging into Lake Michigan. The OMC plants were subsequently added to the National Priorities List, and was designated as one of 43 Great Lakes Areas of Concern. Cleanup of the site began in 1990, with OMC providing $20–25 million in funding. During the OMC cleanup, additional soil contaminants were found at the location of the former Waukegan Manufactured Gas and Coke Company. Soil removal was completed at the coke site in 2005, and cleanup of that soil will continue for several years.

In the early 1920s, Johns Manville built a large asbestos manufacturing plant. The site is located 1 mi (1.6 km) north of the OMC site. In 1988, asbestos contamination found in groundwater and air prompted listing on the National Priorities List and subsequent cleanup. In 1991, the soil cover of the asbestos was completed. However, additional asbestos contamination was found outside the Johns-Manville property, which will require further cleanup.

The Yeoman Creek Landfill is a Superfund site located 1.5 miles (2.4 km) west of the Johns Manville site. The site operated as a landfill from 1959 to 1969. In 1970, it was discovered that the lack of a bottom liner in the landfill had allowed leachate to enter groundwater, contaminating the water with volatile organic compounds and PCBs, and releasing gases that presented an explosion hazard. All major cleanup construction activities were completed in 2005, and monitoring of local water and air continues. The book Lake Effect by Nancy Nichols gives an account of the effects of PCBs on Waukegan residents. The Johns Manville site was cited due to its high concentration of PCBs and asbestos.

== Demographics ==
Historical population
| Census | Pop. | Note | %± |
|---|---|---|---|
| 1860 | 3,433 | | — |
| 1870 | 4,507 | | 31.3% |
| 1880 | 4,012 | | −11.0% |
| 1890 | 4,915 | | 22.5% |
| 1900 | 9,426 | | 91.8% |
| 1910 | 16,069 | | 70.5% |
| 1920 | 19,226 | | 19.6% |
| 1930 | 33,499 | | 74.2% |
| 1940 | 34,241 | | 2.2% |
| 1950 | 46,698 | | 36.4% |
| 1960 | 61,784 | | 32.3% |
| 1970 | 65,134 | | 5.4% |
| 1980 | 67,653 | | 3.9% |
| 1990 | 69,392 | | 2.6% |
| 2000 | 89,426 | | 28.9% |
| 2010 | 89,078 | | −0.4% |
| 2020 | 89,321 | | 0.3% |
U.S. Decennial Census

=== Racial and ethnic composition ===
Waukegan city, Illinois – Racial and ethnic composition Note: the US Census treats Hispanic/Latino as an ethnic category. This table excludes Latinos from the racial categories and assigns them to a separate category. Hispanics/Latinos may be of any race.
| Race / Ethnicity (NH = Non-Hispanic) | Pop 2000 | Pop 2010 | Pop 2020 | % 2000 | % 2010 | % 2020 |
|---|---|---|---|---|---|---|
| White alone (NH) | 27,186 | 19,370 | 14,003 | 30.93% | 21.74% | 15.68% |
| Black alone (NH) | 16,354 | 16,240 | 14,647 | 18.61% | 18.23% | 16.40% |
| Native American or Alaska Native alone (NH) | 168 | 173 | 129 | 0.19% | 0.19% | 0.14% |
| Asian alone (NH) | 3,092 | 3,722 | 4,576 | 3.52% | 4.18% | 5.12% |
| Native Hawaiian or Pacific Islander alone (NH) | 37 | 26 | 35 | 0.04% | 0.03% | 0.04% |
| Other race alone (NH) | 398 | 577 | 817 | 0.45% | 0.65% | 0.91% |
| Mixed or Multiracial (NH) | 1,270 | 1,358 | 2,011 | 1.44% | 1.52% | 2.25% |
| Hispanic or Latino (any race) | 39,396 | 47,612 | 53,103 | 44.82% | 53.45% | 59.45% |
| Total | 87,901 | 89,078 | 89,321 | 100.00% | 100.00% | 100.00% |

=== 2020 census ===
As of the 2020 census, there were 89,321 people, 29,981 households, and 20,264 families residing in the city. The population density was 3,649.48 inhabitants per square mile (1,409.07/km^{2}).

The median age was 33.7 years. 26.3% of residents were under the age of 18 and 10.4% were 65 years of age or older. For every 100 females there were 100.6 males, and for every 100 females age 18 and over there were 99.4 males age 18 and over.

99.8% of residents lived in urban areas, while 0.2% lived in rural areas.

There were 31,756 housing units at an average density of 1,297.49 per square mile (500.96/km^{2}), of which 5.6% were vacant. The homeowner vacancy rate was 1.4% and the rental vacancy rate was 5.8%.

Of the 29,981 households, 39.5% had children under the age of 18 living in them. 41.1% were married-couple households, 21.2% were households with a male householder and no spouse or partner present, and 29.6% were households with a female householder and no spouse or partner present. About 25.6% of all households were made up of individuals and 7.9% had someone living alone who was 65 years of age or older.

Racial composition as of the 2020 census
| Race | Number | Percent |
|---|---|---|
| White | 20,640 | 23.1% |
| Black or African American | 15,175 | 17.0% |
| American Indian and Alaska Native | 2,409 | 2.7% |
| Asian | 4,674 | 5.2% |
| Native Hawaiian and Other Pacific Islander | 61 | 0.1% |
| Some other race | 31,302 | 35.0% |
| Two or more races | 15,060 | 16.9% |
| Hispanic or Latino (of any race) | 53,103 | 59.5% |

=== Income ===
The median income for a household in the city was $53,778, and the median income for a family was $63,401. Males had a median income of $34,308 versus $26,367 for females. The per capita income for the city was $24,827. About 12.6% of families and 15.5% of the population were below the poverty line, including 24.1% of those under age 18 and 10.1% of those age 65 or over.

=== 2023 American Community Survey 1-Year Estimates ===
| Racial Makeup of Waukegan (2023): 1. White alone (29.5%); 2. Black alone (12.6%); 3. Native American alone (3.32%); 4. Asian alone (4.28%); 5. Pacific Islander alone (0.00%); 6. Some other race (29.0%); 7. Two or more races (21.3%) | Racial Makeup of Waukegan treating Hispanics as a Racial Category (2023); NH=Non-Hispanic: 1. White NH (17.1%); 2. Black NH (12.4%); 3. Native American NH (0.00%); 4. Asian NH (4.21%); 5. Pacific Islander NH (0.00%); 6. Other race NH (0.12%); 7. Two or more races NH (3.57%); 8. Hispanic Any Race (62.6%) | Racial Makeup of Hispanics in Waukegan (2023): 1. White alone (19.9%); 2. Black alone (0.17%); 3. Native American alone (5.31%); 4. Asian alone (0.11%); 5. Pacific Islander alone (0.00%); 6. Other race alone (46.1%); 7. Two or more races (28.4%) |

=== Religion ===
Over half (54.4%) of the population identified as members of a religious group. The largest group were Roman Catholics, who comprised 31.0% of city residents. Other Christian groups included Lutherans (3.2%), Baptists (1.9%), Presbyterians (1.6%), and Methodists (1.5%); about 11% adhered to other Christian denominations. Other faiths practiced include Judaism (2.7%) and Islam (1.4%).

Christ Episcopal Church on the corner of Grand Avenue and West Street is a historic church, one of the first in Waukegan.

The Roman Catholic Archdiocese of Chicago operates Catholic churches. On July 1, 2020, St. Anastasia Parish and St. Dismas Parish merged, with the former having the parish school and the latter having the parish church.

== Economy ==
According to Waukegan's 2023 Comprehensive Annual Financial Report, the top employers in the city were:

| # | Employer | # of Employees |
|---|---|---|
| 1 | Lake County | 2,400 |
| 2 | Southwire Co., LLC | 1,500 |
| 3 | Vista Medical Center East | 840 |
| 4 | Lake Behavioral Hospital | 700 |
| 5 | Medline Industries Inc. | 650 |
| 6 | Jewel-Osco | 515 |
| 7 | Waukegan Community Unit School District 60 | 500 |
| 8 | City of Waukegan | 483 |
| 9 | Bel Resources | 450 |
| 10 | Kiley Developmental Center | 425 |

=== Revitalization ===
The city has plans for the redevelopment of the lakefront. The lakefront and harbor plan calls for most industrial activity to be removed, except for the Midwest Generation power plant and North Shore wastewater treatment facilities. The existing industry would be replaced by residential and recreational space. The city also set up several tax increment financing zones, which have been successful in attracting new developers. The first step in the revitalization effort, the opening of the Genesee Theatre, has been completed, many new restaurants have opened, buildings have been renovated, and the City of Waukegan has made substantial investments in the pedestrian areas and other infrastructure.

The city has had an annual "Scoop the Loop" summer festival of cruising since 1998, which, since 2010, has become a monthly event during the summer. The current incarnation is known as "Scoop Unplugged".

== Arts and culture ==
ArtWauk is an art event that happens every third Saturday of the month in downtown Waukegan. It features paintings, sculptures, films, dance, theater, comedy, music, performance art, food, and pedicabs all in the Waukegan Arts District. Other events include the Chicago Latino Film Festival and HolidayWauk. The Fiestas Patrias Parade and Festival in downtown Waukegan highlights and celebrates the independence of the many Hispanic countries that are represented in Waukegan.

=== Historical sites ===
- Bowen Park
- Genesee Theatre
- Jack Benny Center for the Arts
- Naval Station Great Lakes
- Waukegan Building
- Waukegan Harbor Light
- Waukegan Public Library

== Government ==
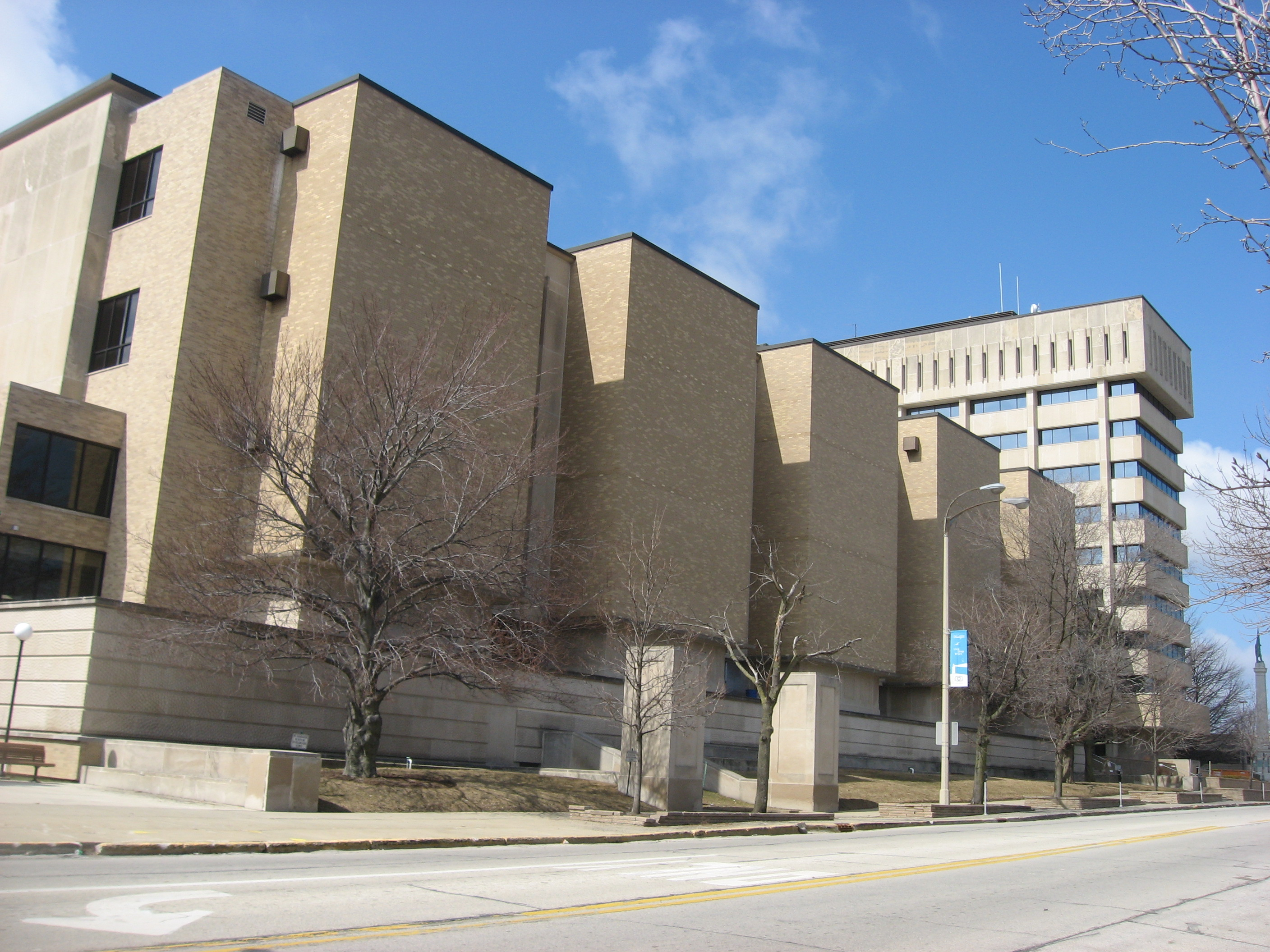
Lake County Courthouse

Waukegan is run on a mayor–council government. The city government consists of a single elected mayor and city clerk, with a city council composed of nine alderpersons, who are elected to represent the nine wards of the city. Any new members are sworn in on the first Monday in May of their respective election year, as it coincides with the first city council meeting of the month.

The mayor of Waukegan is Sam Cunningham. He was elected in April 2025, defeating incumbent Ann B. Taylor. He had previously been mayor from 2017–2021. Early mayors (1849–1909) served one-year terms.

| Image | Name | Term start | Term end | Notes |
|---|---|---|---|---|
| | Theodore H. Durst | 1923 | | |
| | ? | | | |
| | Robert E. Coulson | 1949 | | |
| | ? | | | |
| | Robert V. Sabonjian (1st term) | 1957 | 1977 | Served five terms (non-consecutive with interruption); returned for a sixth term later |
| | Bill Morris | 1977 | 1985 | Defeated Sabonjian in 1977; served two terms. |
| | Robert V. Sabonjian (2nd term) | 1985 | 1989 | Returned for a sixth term after Morris's tenure. |
| | Haig Paravonian | 1989 | 1993 | Succeeded Sabonjian upon his retirement. |
| | William F. Durkin | 1993 | 2001 | Served two terms; last mayor to be reelected until 2025. |
| | Robert Sabonjian Jr. | 2009 | 2013 | Son of Robert V. Sabonjian; served one term. |
| | Sam Cunningham | 2017 | 2021 | First black mayor of Waukegan; served his first, non-consecutive term. |
| | Ann B. Taylor | 2021 | 2025 | First female mayor. |
| | Sam Cunningham | 2025 | Incumbent | Re-elected for his second, non-consecutive term during the April 1st election. |

== Education ==
The majority of Waukegan is within Waukegan Public School District 60. It serves about 17,000 students in preschool through grade 12. Waukegan has three early childhood schools, 13 elementary schools, five middle schools, and three high schools. The multicampus Waukegan High School serves local high school students in two different campuses: Brookside and Washington. Brookside Campus serves as a 9th–10th grade learning center, while Washington Campus serves as an 11th–12th grade learning center.

Parts of Waukegan extend into other school districts. One portion is within Gurnee School District 56 and Warren Township High School District 121, and a small section is in Beach Park Community Consolidated School District 3 and Zion-Benton Township High School District 126.

A network of private schools exists within the city. Cristo Rey St. Martin College Prep is a private Catholic high school, located within a former Kmart in Waukegan. Immanuel Lutheran School is a prekindergarten - grade 8 school of the Wisconsin Evangelical Lutheran Synod in Waukegan.

== Transportation ==
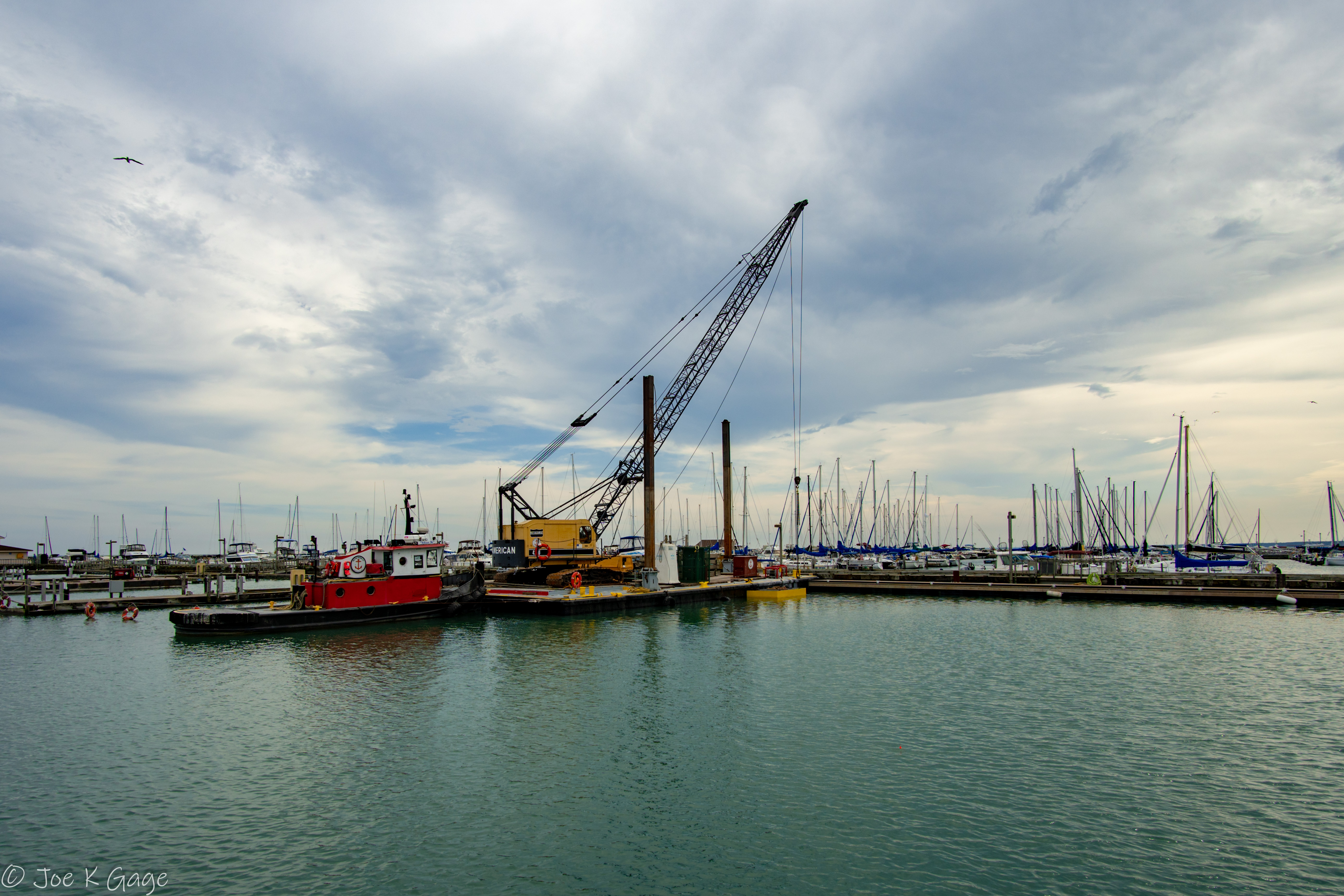
Waukegan Harbor

=== Air ===
Waukegan National Airport is certified for general aviation traffic and has a U.S. Customs facility, allowing for direct international flights. Commercial air service is available at other nearby airports such as Chicago-O'Hare International Airport, Chicago-Midway International Airport, and Milwaukee Mitchell International Airport.

=== Marine ===
The Waukegan Port District operates the city harbor and regional airport. Waukegan Harbor has a recreational marina and an industrial port, which provides access for 90–100 large shipping vessels yearly. Companies with cargo facilities at the port include Gold Bond Building Products (capacity for 100,000 tons of gypsum), LaFarge Corp (12 cement silos), and St Mary's Cement Co (two cement silos).

=== Roads ===
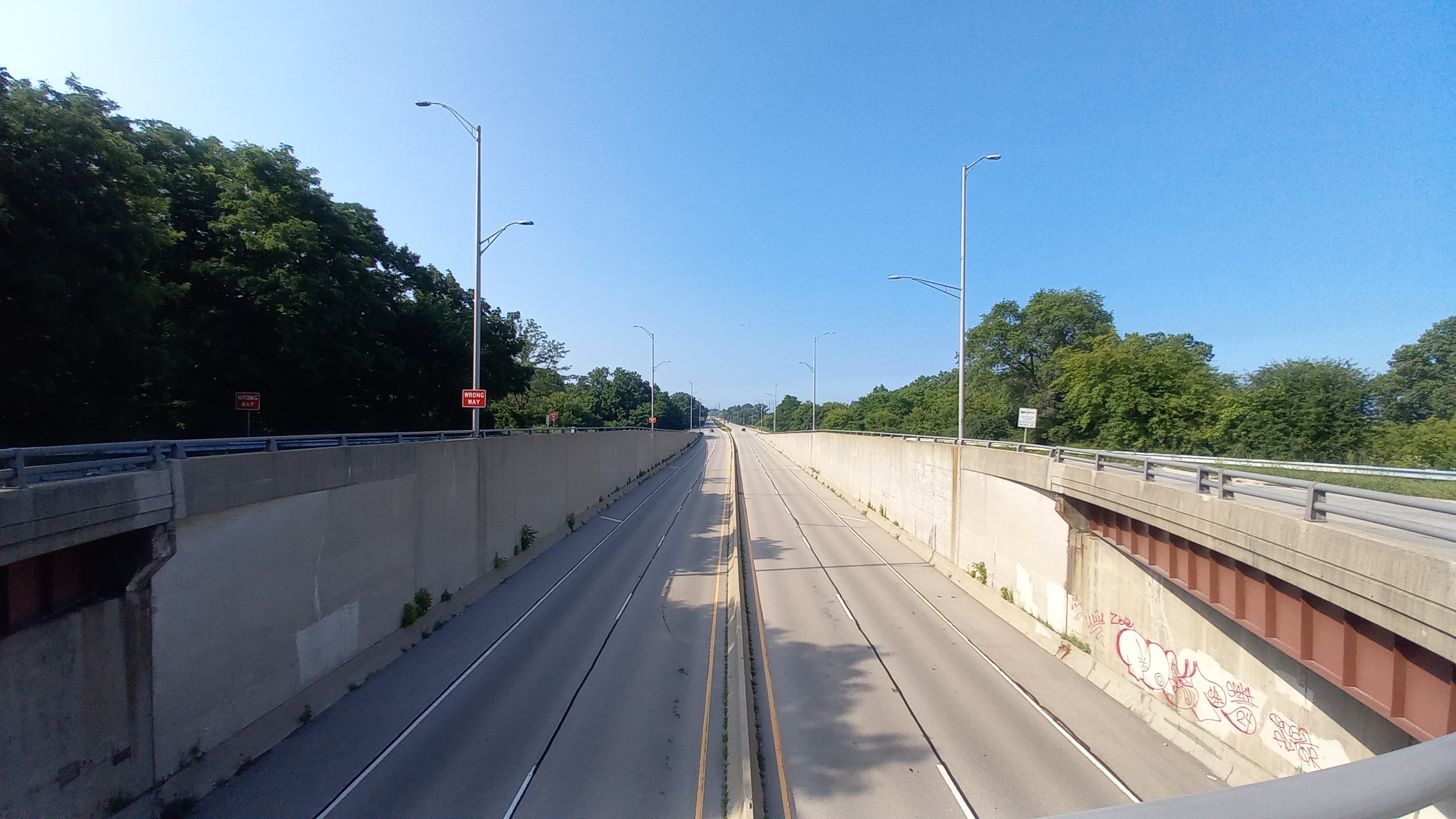
The Amstutz Expressway at Grand Avenue near downtown Waukegan

==== Interstates ====
- Tri-State Tollway

==== U.S. Routes ====
- Skokie Highway

==== Illinois State Routes ====
- Waukegan Road
- Belvidere Road
- Green Bay Road
- Grand Avenue
- Amstutz Expressway and Sheridan Road

==== Other Major Roads ====
- Lewis Avenue
- Washington Street
- Genesse Street
- Sunset Avenue
- Delany Road

=== Trails ===
The Robert McClory Bike Path passes through Waukegan. It provides a non-motor route spanning from Kenosha, Wisconsin, to the North Shore, along the right of way of the former Chicago North Shore and Milwaukee Railroad.

=== Transit ===
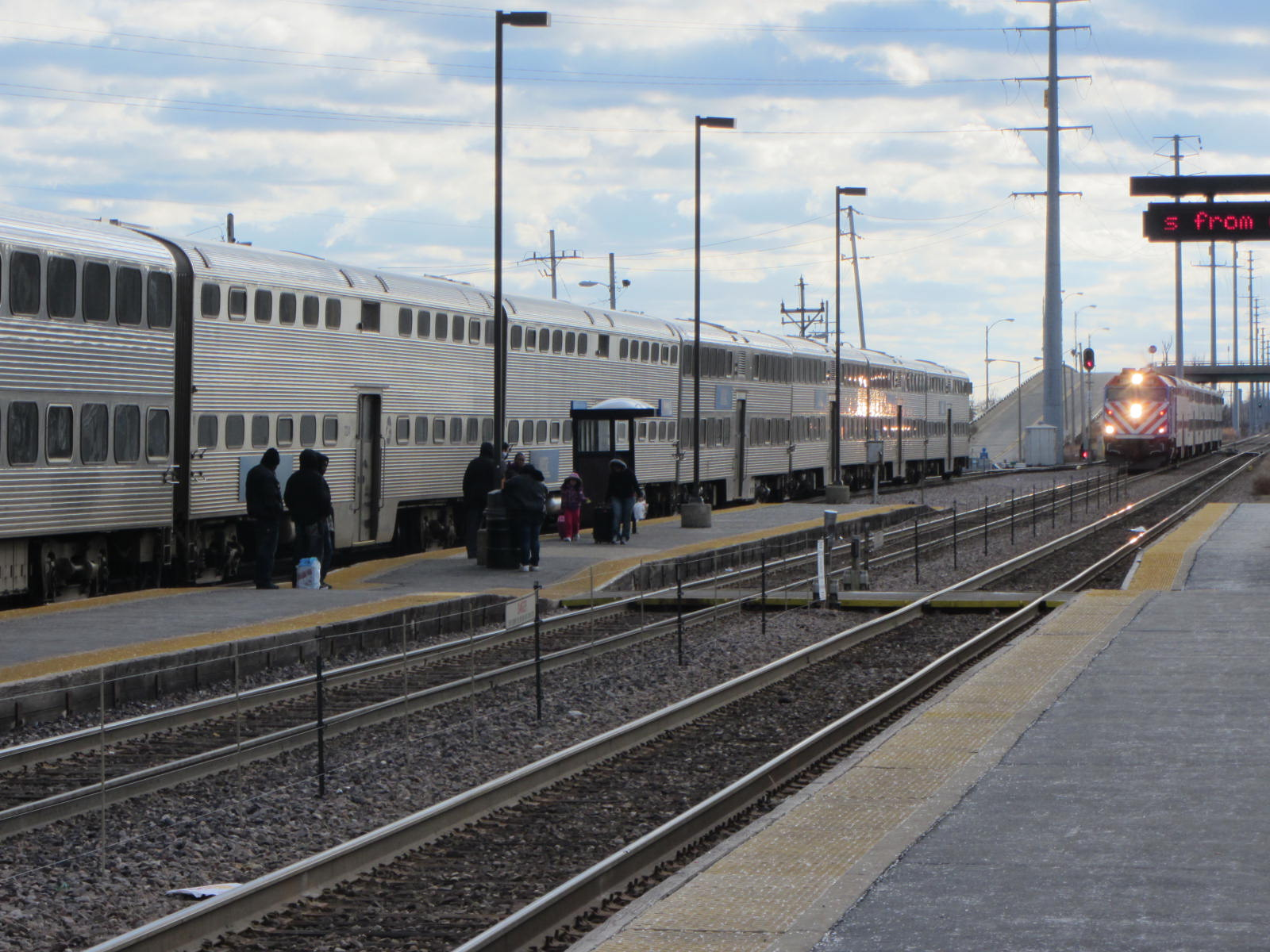
A Metra train arriving into the Waukegan station.

==== Bus ====
Pace provides bus service on numerous routes throughout the city with a hub in downtown at the intersection of Sheridan Road and Washington Street.

==== Rail ====
Waukegan's rail station is served by Metra's Union Pacific/North Line (UP-N), which provides daily commuter rail service south to Ogilvie Transportation Center in downtown Chicago and north to Kenosha, Wisconsin. It is located between downtown and Waukegan Harbor, adjacent to the Amstutz Expressway. A majority of UP-N trains terminate in Waukegan and do not continue on to Kenosha. A coach yard is located next to the Waukegan station.

Union Pacific Railroad has a rail yard in Waukegan just north of the Metra station that serves its Kenosha Subdivision line. UP also operates its Milwaukee Subdivision line on the City's west side. Canadian National operates its Waukegan Subdivision line through the City, which was formally part of the Elgin, Joliet, and Eastern Railway. CPKC operates its C&M Subdivision on the City's west side and hosts Amtrak trains, although none stop in the City.

The City of Waukegan is exploring the idea of building a second train station on the City's west side as part of a project called Next Stop Waukegan. It would potentially be a stop on Amtrak's Hiawatha Service (which goes to Milwaukee, Wisconsin) and Borealis (which goes to St. Paul, Minnesota). Currently, there is no Amtrak service that directly serves Waukegan.

== Sister cities ==
Waukegan has one sister city:

Miyazaki, Japan

Although the city has no official sister city relationship, Waukegan is home to about 6,000 people from Tonatico, Mexico, according to a February 2017 article in The Washington Post. This has created ongoing ties between the two cities.
