= Palm Beach, Illinois =

- Unincorporated community
- Location within Illinois Location within the United States
- Coordinates: 42°22′36″N 88°11′50″W
- Country: United States
- State: Illinois
- County: Lake McHenry
- Townships: Grant, McHenry
- Elevation: 751 ft (229 m)
- Time zone: UTC-6 (Central (CST))
  - Summer (DST): UTC-5 (CDT)
- Area codes: 815 & 779
- GNIS feature ID: 415309

Palm Beach is an unincorporated community in northern Illinois, United States. It lies in Lake and McHenry counties at the southern end of Pistakee Lake.
