= Monaville =

Monaville may refer to:

- Monaville, Illinois, an unincorporated community in Lake Villa Township, Lake County, Illinois, United States
- Monaville, Texas, an unincorporated community in Waller County, Texas, United States
- Monaville, West Virginia, a census-designated place in Logan County, West Virginia, United States
