= Lake County, Illinois =

County in Illinois, United States

- County
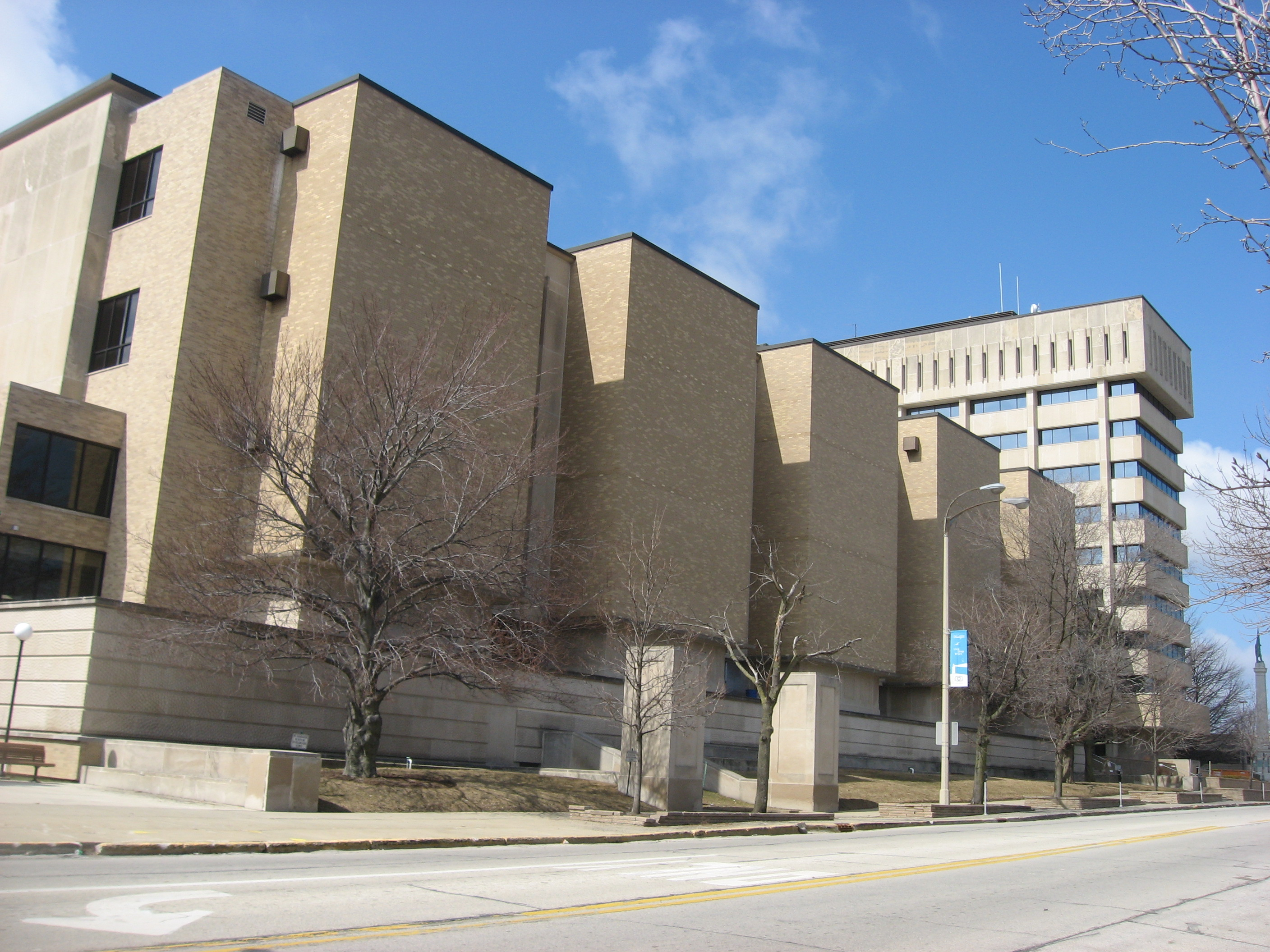
- Lake County Courthouse in Waukegan

- Flag Seal Logo
- Nickname: L.C.
- Location within the U.S. state of Illinois
- Coordinates: 42°26′N 87°47′W
- Country: United States
- State: Illinois
- Founded: March 1, 1839
- Named for: Lake Michigan
- Seat: Waukegan
- Largest city: Waukegan

Area
  - Total: 1,368 sq mi (3,540 km^{2})
  - Land: 444 sq mi (1,150 km^{2})
  - Water: 925 sq mi (2,400 km^{2}) 67.6%

Population (2020)
  - Total: 714,342
  - Estimate (2025): 719,339 ▲
  - Density: 1,610/sq mi (621/km^{2})
- Time zone: UTC−6 (Central)
  - Summer (DST): UTC−5 (CDT)
- Congressional districts: 5th, 9th, 10th, 11th
- Website: www.lakecountyil.gov

Lake County is a county located in the northeastern corner of the U.S. state of Illinois, along the shores of Lake Michigan. As of the 2020 census, it has a population of 714,342, making it the third-most populous county in Illinois. Its county seat is Waukegan, the tenth-largest city in Illinois. The county is a mixture of suburban areas, urban areas, and some rural areas. Located to the north of Cook County, Lake County is one of the collar counties of the Chicago metropolitan area. Its northern boundary is the Wisconsin state line.

According to the 2010 census, Lake County is the second wealthiest county in the state by per capita income, after DuPage County. Additionally, Lake County ranks as the 27th wealthiest county in the nation. The county includes the affluent North Shore communities of Lake Forest, Lake Bluff, and Highland Park, and much of the county's wealth is concentrated in this area, as well as in communities bordering Cook County to the south and McHenry County to the west. The north and northwest areas of the county, though historically rural and exurban, have experienced rapid suburbanization in the past three decades, while the lakefront communities of Waukegan, North Chicago, and Zion are postindustrial areas that have majority-minority populations. The Hispanic population has seen significant increases in nearly all areas of the county and comprise 24% of the county's population in 2020.

The expansive Naval Station Great Lakes is located in the city of North Chicago. It is the United States Navy's Headquarters Command for training, and the Navy's only recruit training center. One Wetland of International Importance is primarily located in the county, Chiwaukee Prairie Illinois Beach Lake Plain, which encompasses Illinois Beach State Park and some of the lakeside lands of the Lake County Forest Preserve District.

== History ==
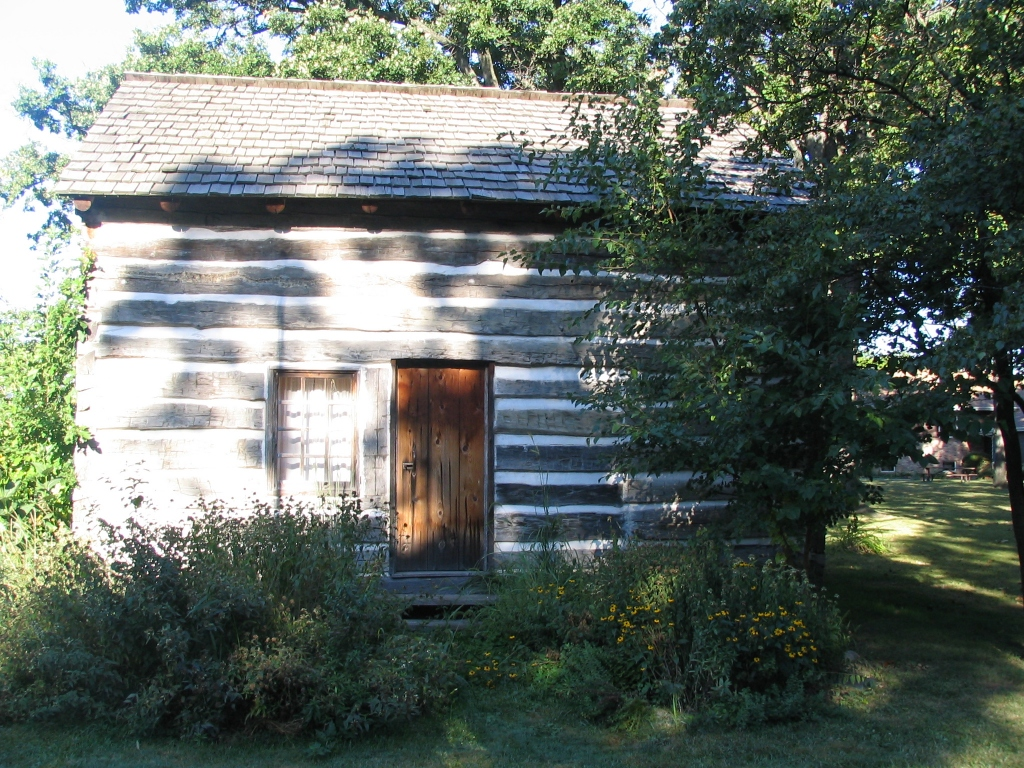
The Caspar Ott Cabin, built in 1837, is the oldest structure in Lake County.

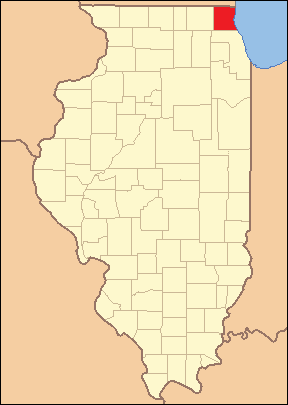
Lake County at the time of its creation in 1839

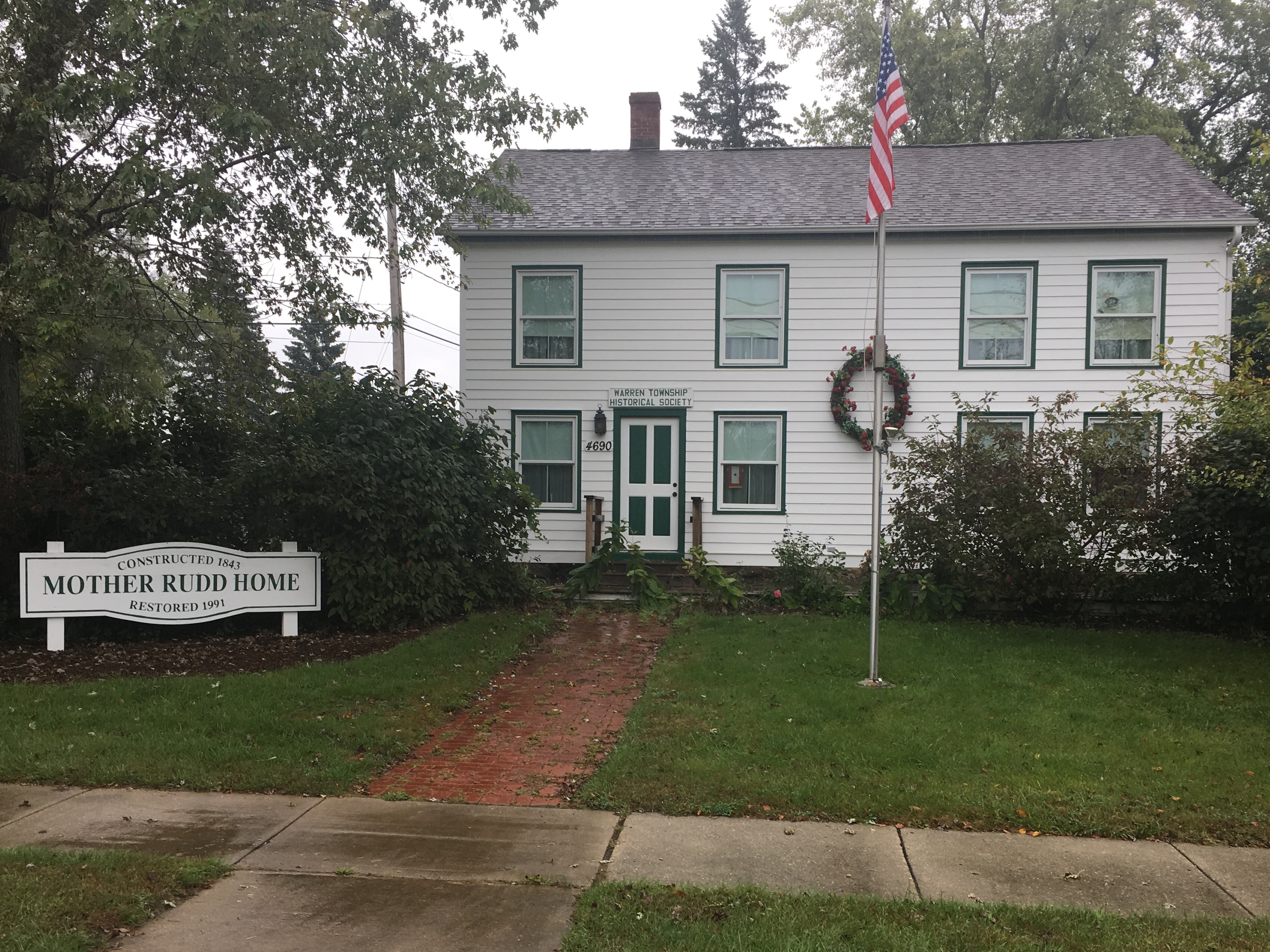
The Mother Rudd House and Inn, built from 1841 to 1843, is the oldest structure in Warren Township.

The county was created by the Illinois State Legislature in 1839. At that time, the county was mostly unsettled; Libertyville, then known as Independence Grove, was the first county seat. In 1841, however, the county's residents voted to move the county government to Little Fort, now Waukegan, where the commissioners had purchased a section of land from the state. Lake County's first courthouse was built on part of that land in 1844 and the remainder was sold to pay for the $4,000 construction cost.

The county's first courthouse was used solely for court sessions and the jail, but in 1853, commissioners constructed a building to accommodate county administration offices and house records. When fire damaged the courthouse on October 19, 1875, the county records were saved because they were in the adjacent building.

After the fire, proposals were made to move the county seat to Highland Park, Libertyville or another site in central Lake County. The county commissioners, however, decided to rebuild in Waukegan. The east half of the building was reconstructed at a cost of $45,000. In 1895, the first jail building was added to the government complex and a west addition was added to the courthouse in 1922. By 1938, county commissioners saw a need for additional space and approved the addition of a 5th Floor. This courthouse, however, was demolished in 1967 to make room for a new high-rise administration building, which was completed with the addition of the jail in 1969 and courts in 1970.

Shortly thereafter, the Lake County Board commissioned the construction of a multi-faceted justice facility and ground was broken in 1986 for the Robert H. Babcox Justice Center, named in memory of Sheriff Babcox, who served as Lake County Sheriff from 1982 to 1988. The justice center, which houses the county jail, work release program, sheriff's administration offices and three courtrooms, was finished in 1989 at a cost of $29.6 million.

Additional county government facilities have been built or expanded throughout Lake County, including the Coroner's Office, Health Department/Community Health Center facilities, Division of Transportation, Public Works and Winchester House. Lake County government services extend throughout the county's 470 square miles (1,200 km^{2}).

The historic Half Day Inn, a tavern/restaurant, was constructed in 1843. This structure, once located at the corner of Milwaukee Avenue and Rte. 45/Old Half Day Road, was one of the oldest structures in Lake County until it was demolished in 2007 to make way for retail space, condominiums, and a retention pond.

== Geography ==
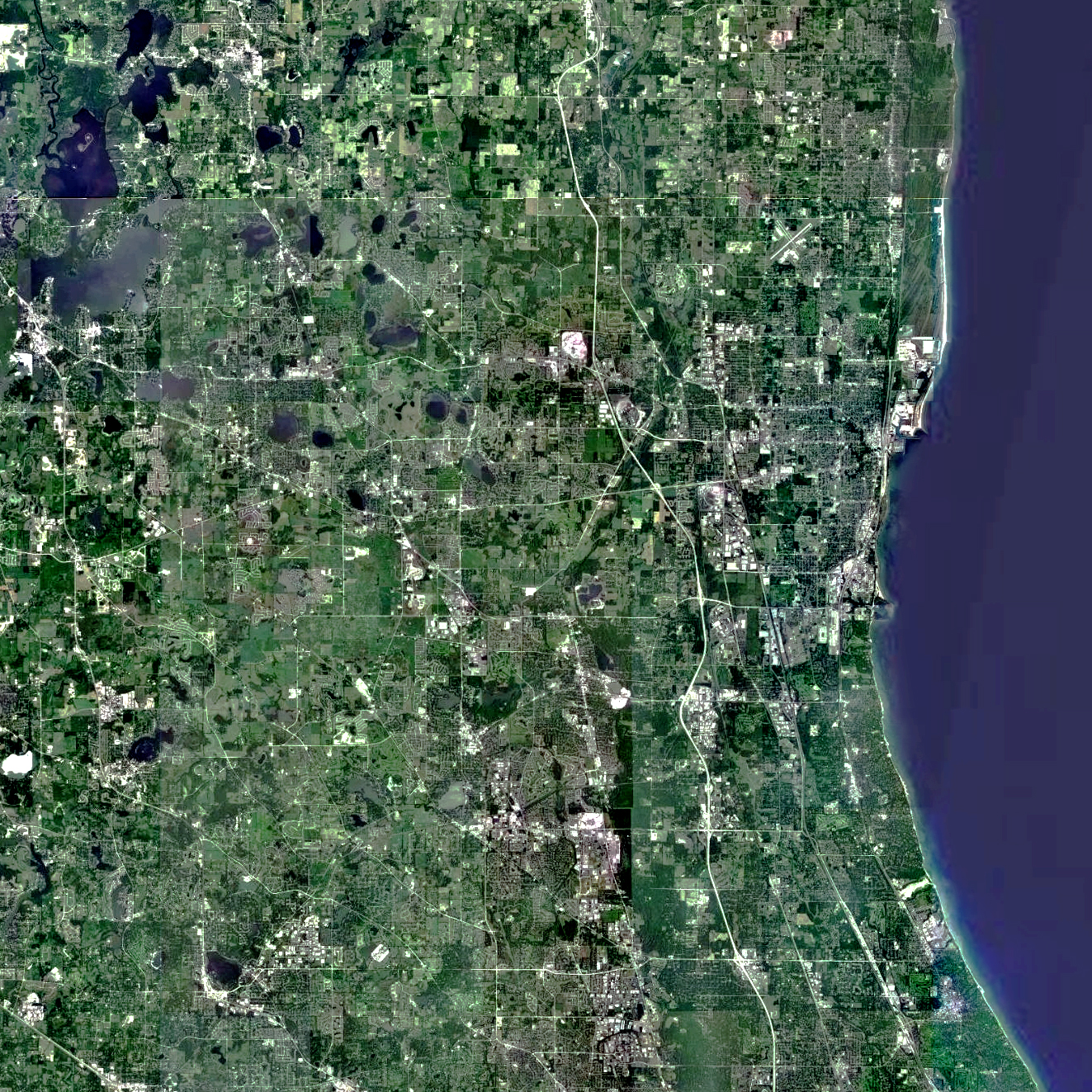
Satellite view of the Lake County district

According to the U.S. Census Bureau, the county has a total area of 1,368 square miles (3,540 km^{2}), of which 444 square miles (1,150 km^{2}) is land and 935 square miles (2,420 km^{2}) (67.6%) is water. It is the second-largest county in Illinois by total area and the only one that has more water area than land area. Most of the water is in Lake Michigan.

=== State parks ===
- Illinois Beach State Park
- North Point Marina
- Volo Bog State Natural Area
- Chain O'Lakes State Park

=== Lakes ===
Besides Lake Michigan, lakes in the county include:

- Bangs Lake
- Channel Lake
- Countryside Lake
- Diamond Lake
- Druce Lake
- East Loon Lake
- Fox Lake
- Gages Lake
- Grays Lake
- Highland Lake
- Island Lake
- Loon Lake
- Wooster Lake

=== Natural areas ===
Lake County's forest preserves and natural areas are administered by the Lake County Forest Preserves district. These facilities include traditional nature preserves, such as the Ryerson Conservation Area, as well as golf courses and historic homes, such as the Adlai Stevenson historic home. A long north–south string of the preserves in Lake County, including Half Day Woods, Old School Forest Preserve, Independence Grove, and Van Patten Woods, form the Des Plaines River Greenway, which contains the Des Plaines River Trail, a popular place for walking, running, and biking. Lake County is also home to Illinois Beach State Park, featuring over six miles of Lake Michigan shoreline, as well as dune areas, wetlands, prairie, and black oak savanna. Several local environmental groups operate in Lake County, such as Conserve Lake County and Citizens for Conservation, working to improve habitat. Volunteer opportunities also exist with the Lake County Forest Preserve District.

=== Adjacent counties ===
- Kenosha County, Wisconsin – north
- Cook County – south
- McHenry County – west
- Van Buren County, Michigan – east

=== Transit ===
- Metra
- Milwaukee District North Line
- North Central Service
- Union Pacific North Line
- Union Pacific Northwest Line
- Pace

=== Major highways ===
- Interstate 41
- Interstate 94
- U.S. Route 12
- U.S. Route 14
- U.S. Route 41
- U.S. Route 45
- Illinois Route 21
- Illinois Route 22
- Illinois Route 43
- Illinois Route 53
- Illinois Route 59
- Illinois Route 60
- Illinois Route 83
- Illinois Route 120
- Illinois Route 131
- Illinois Route 132
- Illinois Route 134
- Illinois Route 137
- Illinois Route 173
- Illinois Route 176

=== County routes and county highways ===
Lake County's county road system currently covers 300 miles of road. The county also employs two different numbering systems, a county route system and a county highway system. While both systems' can be seen on official road maps, only the County Route designations have been indicated with highway markers on traffic signals or dedicated poles.

The county route system in use today by Lake County was purportedly intended to be the dominant system for all of Illinois's counties and was proposed by the National Association of Counties (NACo), however their system was not chosen and instead each county was given the freedom to number their own county routes as well as choose whether or not to produce and display highway markers. Currently, only Lake County, Boone County, McHenry County and Cook County use NACo's proposed numbering system, and of the four only Lake and McHenry counties chose to fully display the county route designations on highway markers. Cook County began to roll out the production of highway markers near the beginning of 2009, but the seemingly arbitrary numbering system as well as the cost to produce the markers resulted in a lot of confusion and backlash, and ultimately only some of the markers were produced and mounted.

For Lake County, all East–West-bound County Routes begin with an "A", while North—South-bound County Routes on the western half of the county begin with a "V", and those located on the eastern half begin with a "W".

== Demographics ==
Historical population
Census	Pop.	Note	%±
1840	2,634		—
1850	14,226		440.1%
1860	18,257		28.3%
1870	21,014		15.1%
1880	21,296		1.3%
1890	24,235		13.8%
1900	34,504		42.4%
1910	55,058		59.6%
1920	74,285		34.9%
1930	104,387		40.5%
1940	121,094		16.0%
1950	179,097		47.9%
1960	293,656		64.0%
1970	382,638		30.3%
1980	440,372		15.1%
1990	516,418		17.3%
2000	644,356		24.8%
2010	703,462		9.2%
2020	714,342		1.5%
2025 (est.)	719,339	▲	0.7%
U.S. Decennial Census; 1790-1960 1900-1990; 1990-2000 2010-2020

=== 2020 census ===
As of the 2020 census, the county had a population of 714,342. The median age was 39.3 years. 23.8% of residents were under the age of 18, and 15.0% of residents were 65 years of age or older. For every 100 females there were 98.8 males, and for every 100 females age 18 and over there were 97.0 males age 18 and over.

The racial makeup of the county was 61.0% White, 6.9% Black or African American, 1.0% American Indian and Alaska Native, 8.3% Asian, 0.1% Native Hawaiian and Pacific Islander, 12.1% from some other race, and 10.7% from two or more races. Hispanic or Latino residents of any race comprised 24.1% of the population.

The 2020 census reported that 98.6% of residents lived in urban areas, while 1.4% lived in rural areas.

There were 253,386 households in the county, of which 35.8% had children under the age of 18 living in them. Of all households, 56.0% were married-couple households, 15.0% were households with a male householder and no spouse or partner present, and 23.4% were households with a female householder and no spouse or partner present. About 22.8% of all households were made up of individuals, and 9.9% had someone living alone who was 65 years of age or older.

There were 269,378 housing units, of which 5.9% were vacant. Among occupied housing units, 72.9% were owner-occupied, and 27.1% were renter-occupied. The homeowner vacancy rate was 1.6%, and the rental vacancy rate was 6.6%.

=== Racial and ethnic composition ===
Lake County, Illinois – Racial and Ethnic Composition Note: the US Census treats Hispanic/Latino as an ethnic category. This table excludes Latinos from the racial categories and assigns them to a separate category. Hispanics/Latinos may be of any race.
Race / Ethnicity (NH = Non-Hispanic)	Pop 1980	Pop 1990	Pop 2000	Pop 2010	Pop 2020	% 1980	% 1990	% 2000	% 2010	2020
White alone (NH)	383,370	431,976	472,968	458,701	408,349	87.06%	83.65%	73.40%	65.21%	57.16%
Black or African American alone (NH)	27,842	34,080	43,580	46,989	47,240	6.32%	6.60%	6.76%	6.68%	6.61%
Native American or Alaska Native alone (NH)	860	1,241	1,048	1,058	909	0.20%	0.24%	0.16%	0.15%	0.13%
Asian alone (NH)	5,898	12,038	24,866	43,954	58,901	1.34%	2.33%	3.86%	6.25%	8.25%
Native Hawaiian or Pacific Islander alone (NH)	122	225	224	228	312	0.03%	0.04%	0.03%	0.03%	0.04%
Other race alone (NH)	1,216	348	1,085	1,547	3,264	0.28%	0.07%	0.17%	0.22%	0.46%
Mixed race or Multiracial (NH)	x	x	7,869	10,998	23,405	x	x	1.22%	1.56%	3.28%
Hispanic or Latino (any race)	21,064	36,735	92,716	139,987	171,962	4.78%	7.11%	14.39%	19.90%	24.07%
Total	440,372	516,418	644,356	703,462	714,342	100.00%	100.00%	100.00%	100.00%	100.00%

==== Racial / Ethnic Profile of places in Lake County, Illinois (2020 census) ====
Racial / Ethnic Profile of places in Lake County, Illinois (2020 Census)
Following is a table of towns and census designated places in Lake County, Illinois. Data for the United States (with and without Puerto Rico), the state of Illinois, and Lake County itself have been included for comparison purposes.
The majority racial/ethnic group is coded per the key below. Communities that extend into and adjacent county or counties are delineated with a ‡ followed by an accompanying explanatory note. The full population of each community has been tabulated including the population in adjacent counties.

Majority minority with no dominant group
Majority White
Majority Black
Majority Hispanic
Majority Asian

Racial and ethnic composition of places in Lake County, Illinois (2020 Census) (NH = Non-Hispanic) Note: the US Census treats Hispanic/Latino as an ethnic category. This table excludes Latinos from the racial categories and assigns them to a separate category. Hispanics/Latinos may be of any race.
Place	Designation	Total Population	White alone (NH)	%	Black or African American alone (NH)	%	Native American or Alaska Native alone (NH)	%	Asian alone (NH)	%	Pacific Islander alone (NH)	%	Other race alone (NH)	%	Mixed race or Multiracial (NH)	%	Hispanic or Latino (any race)	%
United States of America (50 states and D.C.)	x	331,449,281	191,697,647	57.84%	39,940,338	12.05%	2,251,699	0.68%	19,618,719	5.92%	622,018	0.19%	1,689,833	0.51%	13,548,983	4.09%	62,080,044	18.73%
United States of America (50 states, D.C., and Puerto Rico)	x	334,735,155	191,722,195	57.28%	39,944,624	11.93%	2,252,011	0.67%	19,621,465	5.86%	622,109	0.19%	1,692,341	0.51%	13,551,323	4.05%	65,329,087	19.52%
Illinois	State	12,812,508	7,472,751	58.32%	1,775,612	13.86%	16,561	0.13%	747,280	5.83%	2,959	0.02%	45,080	0.35%	414,855	3.24%	2,337,410	18.24%
Lake County	County	714,342	408,349	57.16%	47,240	6.61%	909	0.13%	58,901	8.25%	312	0.04%	3,264	0.46%	23,405	3.28%	171,962	24.07%
Highland Park	City	30,176	24,825	82.27%	462	1.53%	25	0.08%	1,094	3.63%	0	0.00%	134	0.44%	948	3.14%	2,688	8.91%
Highwood	City	5,074	2,071	40.82%	110	2.17%	8	0.16%	137	2.70%	0	0.00%	23	0.45%	127	2.50%	2,598	51.20%
Lake Forest	City	19,367	16,380	84.58%	232	1.20%	17	0.09%	1,114	5.75%	3	0.02%	62	0.32%	645	3.33%	914	4.72%
McHenry	City	27,135	21,144	77.92%	280	1.03%	20	0.07%	493	1.82%	4	0.01%	40	0.15%	954	3.52%	4,200	15.48%
North Chicago	City	30,759	8,149	26.49%	8,274	26.90%	94	0.31%	1,710	5.56%	104	0.34%	239	0.78%	1,042	3.39%	11,147	36.24%
Park City	City	7,885	887	11.25%	710	9.00%	2	0.03%	498	6.32%	2	0.03%	42	0.53%	141	1.79%	5,603	71.06%
Waukegan	City	89,321	14,003	15.68%	14,647	16.40%	129	0.14%	4,576	5.12%	35	0.04%	817	0.91%	2,011	2.25%	53,103	59.45%
Zion	City	24,655	5,808	23.56%	7,484	30.35%	55	0.22%	534	2.17%	15	0.06%	177	0.72%	1,100	4.46%	9,482	38.46%
Antioch	Village	14,622	11,328	77.47%	426	2.91%	31	0.21%	485	3.32%	4	0.03%	38	0.26%	689	4.71%	1,621	11.09%
Bannockburn	Village	1,013	667	65.84%	82	8.09%	3	0.30%	168	16.58%	0	0.00%	6	0.59%	42	4.15%	45	4.44%
Barrington ‡	Village	10,722	8,926	83.25%	117	1.09%	8	0.07%	643	6.00%	0	0.00%	12	0.11%	365	3.40%	651	6.07%
Barrington Hills ‡	Village	4,114	3,369	81.89%	39	0.95%	4	0.10%	348	8.46%	0	0.00%	18	0.44%	124	3.01%	212	5.15%
Beach Park	Village	14,249	5,456	38.29%	1,605	11.26%	23	0.16%	798	5.60%	5	0.04%	78	0.55%	472	3.31%	5,812	40.79%
Buffalo Grove ‡	Village	43,212	26,762	61.93%	517	1.20%	36	0.08%	11,865	27.46%	6	0.01%	115	0.27%	1,057	2.45%	2,854	6.60%
Deerfield ‡	Village	19,196	16,649	86.73%	131	0.68%	7	0.04%	1,015	5.29%	1	0.01%	47	0.24%	552	2.88%	794	4.14%
Deer Park ‡	Village	3,681	3,119	84.73%	23	0.62%	6	0.16%	288	7.82%	0	0.00%	5	0.14%	118	3.21%	122	3.31%
Fox Lake ‡	Village	10,978	8,748	79.69%	219	1.99%	15	0.14%	134	1.22%	4	0.04%	16	0.15%	456	4.15%	1,386	12.63%
Fox River Grove ‡	Village	4,702	3,866	82.22%	36	0.77%	3	0.06%	188	4.00%	0	0.00%	18	0.38%	202	4.30%	389	8.27%
Grayslake	Village	21,248	15,180	71.44%	920	4.33%	21	0.10%	1,381	6.50%	4	0.02%	86	0.40%	805	3.79%	2,851	13.42%
Green Oaks	Village	4,128	3,253	78.80%	41	0.99%	2	0.05%	401	9.71%	2	0.05%	11	0.27%	189	4.58%	229	5.55%
Gurnee	Village	30,706	17,463	56.87%	2,643	8.61%	40	0.13%	3,743	12.19%	22	0.07%	189	0.62%	1,166	3.80%	5,440	17.72%
Hainesville	Village	3,546	1,976	55.72%	193	5.44%	6	0.17%	364	10.27%	2	0.06%	18	0.51%	129	3.64%	858	24.20%
Hawthorn Woods	Village	9,062	6,795	74.98%	121	1.34%	10	0.11%	1,349	14.89%	5	0.06%	18	0.20%	316	3.49%	448	4.94%
Indian Creek	Village	536	319	59.51%	23	4.29%	5	0.93%	140	26.12%	0	0.00%	3	0.56%	19	3.54%	27	5.04%
Island Lake ‡	Village	8,051	6,137	76.23%	96	1.19%	10	0.12%	159	1.97%	1	0.01%	21	0.26%	299	3.71%	1,328	16.49%
Kildeer	Village	4,091	3,073	75.12%	19	0.46%	4	0.10%	673	16.45%	2	0.05%	7	0.17%	133	3.25%	180	4.40%
Lake Barrington	Village	5,100	4,473	87.71%	31	0.61%	4	0.08%	234	4.59%	0	0.00%	14	0.27%	161	3.16%	183	3.59%
Lake Bluff	Village	5,616	4,841	86.20%	29	0.52%	2	0.04%	314	5.59%	1	0.02%	29	0.52%	206	3.67%	194	3.45%
Lake Villa	Village	8,741	6,404	73.26%	408	4.67%	4	0.05%	534	6.11%	3	0.03%	37	0.42%	362	4.14%	989	11.31%
Lake Zurich	Village	19,759	15,552	78.71%	174	0.88%	8	0.04%	1,781	9.01%	2	0.01%	31	0.16%	573	2.90%	1,638	8.29%
Lakemoor ‡	Village	6,182	4,568	73.89%	149	2.41%	6	0.10%	166	2.69%	0	0.00%	20	0.32%	241	3.90%	1,032	16.69%
Libertyville	Village	20,579	17,061	82.90%	262	1.27%	14	0.07%	1,238	6.02%	4	0.02%	55	0.27%	759	3.69%	1,186	5.76%
Lincolnshire	Village	7,940	5,815	73.24%	83	1.05%	4	0.05%	1,457	18.35%	2	0.03%	12	0.15%	259	3.26%	308	3.88%
Lindenhurst	Village	14,406	11,044	76.66%	391	2.71%	20	0.14%	733	5.09%	2	0.01%	46	0.32%	516	3.58%	1,654	11.48%
Long Grove	Village	8,366	5,867	70.13%	134	1.60%	6	0.07%	1,641	19.62%	3	0.04%	21	0.25%	265	3.17%	429	5.13%
Mettawa	Village	533	409	76.74%	4	0.75%	1	0.19%	55	10.32%	0	0.00%	1	0.19%	6	1.13%	57	10.69%
Mundelein	Village	31,560	16,431	52.06%	601	1.90%	21	0.07%	3,492	11.06%	7	0.02%	80	0.25%	836	2.65%	10,092	31.98%
North Barrington	Village	3,171	2,703	85.24%	28	0.88%	5	0.16%	199	6.28%	0	0.00%	14	0.44%	109	3.44%	113	3.56%
Old Mill Creek	Village	162	131	80.86%	1	0.62%	1	0.62%	1	0.62%	0	0.00%	0	0.00%	10	6.17%	18	11.11%
Port Barrington ‡	Village	1,584	1,257	79.36%	17	1.07%	2	0.13%	99	6.25%	1	0.06%	5	0.32%	44	2.78%	159	10.04%
Riverwoods	Village	3,790	3,142	82.90%	20	0.53%	2	0.05%	351	9.26%	0	0.00%	10	0.26%	128	3.38%	137	3.61%
Round Lake	Village	18,721	8,909	47.59%	1,142	6.10%	20	0.11%	1,925	10.28%	10	0.05%	62	0.33%	755	4.03%	5,898	31.50%
Round Lake Beach	Village	27,252	9,111	33.43%	1,238	4.54%	23	0.08%	806	2.96%	18	0.07%	96	0.35%	802	2.94%	15,158	55.62%
Round Lake Heights	Village	2,622	1,055	40.24%	133	5.07%	2	0.08%	118	4.50%	4	0.15%	9	0.34%	802	30.59%	1,185	45.19%
Round Lake Park	Village	7,680	3,607	46.97%	196	2.55%	6	0.08%	69	0.90%	5	0.07%	24	0.31%	147	1.91%	3,626	47.21%
Third Lake	Village	1,111	938	84.43%	17	1.53%	3	0.27%	21	1.89%	0	0.00%	2	0.18%	32	2.88%	98	8.82%
Tower Lakes	Village	1,226	1,050	85.64%	15	1.22%	3	0.24%	32	2.61%	0	0.00%	8	0.65%	59	4.81%	59	4.81%
Vernon Hills	Village	26,850	15,039	56.01%	635	2.36%	36	0.13%	6,931	25.81%	10	0.04%	120	0.45%	810	3.02%	3,269	12.18%
Volo	Village	6,122	4,153	67.84%	214	3.50%	5	0.08%	524	8.56%	0	0.00%	15	0.25%	279	4.56%	932	15.22%
Wadsworth	Village	3,517	2,581	73.39%	137	3.90%	1	0.03%	70	1.99%	0	0.00%	17	0.48%	141	4.01%	570	16.21%
Wauconda	Village	14,084	9,981	70.87%	155	1.10%	6	0.04%	480	3.41%	0	0.00%	36	0.26%	459	3.26%	2,967	21.07%
Wheeling ‡	Village	39,137	17,805	45.49%	885	2.26%	22	0.06%	6,506	16.62%	6	0.02%	172	0.44%	694	1.77%	13,047	33.34%
Winthrop Harbor	Village	6,705	4,824	71.95%	349	5.21%	19	0.28%	155	2.31%	2	0.03%	43	0.64%	340	5.07%	973	14.51%
Channel Lake	CDP	1,581	1,387	87.73%	6	0.38%	3	0.19%	3	0.19%	0	0.00%	1	0.06%	60	3.80%	121	7.65%
Forest Lake	CDP	1,784	1,468	82.29%	12	0.67%	2	0.11%	79	4.43%	3	0.17%	4	0.22%	80	4.48%	136	7.62%
Fox Lake Hills	CDP	2,684	2,169	80.81%	33	1.23%	0	0.00%	27	1.01%	0	0.00%	6	0.22%	78	2.91%	371	13.82%
Gages Lake	CDP	10,637	7,231	67.98%	505	4.75%	27	0.25%	818	7.69%	6	0.06%	46	0.43%	500	4.70%	1,504	14.14%
Grandwood Park	CDP	5,297	3,196	60.34%	366	6.91%	3	0.06%	635	11.99%	0	0.00%	40	0.76%	233	4.40%	824	15.56%
Knollwood	CDP	2,121	1,339	63.13%	87	4.10%	2	0.09%	109	5.14%	0	0.00%	7	0.33%	61	2.88%	516	24.33%
Lake Catherine	CDP	1,279	1,124	87.88%	12	0.94%	5	0.39%	9	0.70%	0	0.00%	0	0.00%	44	3.44%	85	6.65%
Long Lake	CDP	3,663	2,125	58.01%	59	1.61%	9	0.25%	21	0.57%	0	0.00%	25	0.68%	152	4.15%	1,272	34.73%
Venetian Village	CDP	2,761	2,128	77.07%	52	1.88%	2	0.07%	31	1.12%	0	0.00%	8	0.29%	107	3.88%	433	15.68%

=== 2010 Census ===
Employment by occupation in Lake County

As of the 2010 Census, there were 703,462 people, 241,712 households, and 179,428 families residing in the county. The population density was 1,585.6 inhabitants per square mile (612.2/km^{2}). There were 260,310 housing units at an average density of 586.7 per square mile (226.5/km^{2}). The racial makeup of the county was 75.1% white, 7.0% black or African American, 6.3% Asian, 0.5% American Indian, 8.5% from other races, and 2.6% from two or more races. Those of Hispanic or Latino origin made up 19.9% of the population. In terms of ancestry, 20.5% were German, 12.9% were Irish, 9.4% were Polish, 6.9% were Italian, 6.5% were English, and 4.0% were American.

Of the 241,712 households, 40.8% had children under the age of 18 living with them, 59.6% were married couples living together, 10.4% had a female householder with no husband present, 25.8% were non-families, and 21.5% of all households were made up of individuals. The average household size was 2.82 and the average family size was 3.31. The median age was 36.7 years. The median income for a household in the county was $78,948 and the median income for a family was $91,693. Males had a median income of $62,042 versus $44,200 for females. The per capita income for the county was $38,120. About 4.8% of families and 7.0% of the population were below the poverty line, including 9.6% of those under age 18 and 5.6% of those age 65 or over.

=== 2024 American Community Survey one-year estimates ===
Racial Makeup of Lake County (2024): 1. White alone (61.1%); 2. Black alone (7.17%); 3. Native American alone (0.94%); 4. Asian alone (8.90%); 5. Pacific Islander alone (0.08%); 6. Some other race alone (10.8%); 7. Multiracial (11.0%)	Racial Makeup of Lake County excluding Hispanics from Racial Categories (2024); NH=Non-Hispanic: 1. White NH (54.9%); 2. Black NH (6.43%); 3. Native American NH (0.09%); 4. Asian NH (8.84%); 5. Pacific Islander NH (0.06%); 6. Other race NH (0.34%); 7. Multiracial NH (3.66%); 8. Hispanic Any Race (25.7%)	Racial Makeup of Hispanics in Lake County (2024): 1. White alone (24.1%); 2. Black alone (2.86%); 3. Native American alone (3.29%); 4. Asian alone (0.20%); 5. Pacific Islander alone (0.09%); 6. Other race alone (40.8%); 7. Multiracial (28.6%)

According to 2024 US Census Bureau American Community Survey one-year estimates (which is conducted annually for cities over 65,000 via sampling), the racial population of Lake County (where Latinos are allocated amongst the various racial groupings), Illinois was 61.1% White or European, 7.2% Black or African American, 8.9% Asian, 0.9% Native American and Alaskan Native, 0.1% Pacific Islander, 10.81% Other Race, and 11.0% Multiracial.

If we treat Hispanics as a separate racial category, the 2024 one-year estimates indicate that the racial and ethnic population of Lake County, Illinois was 54.9% Non-Hispanic White, 6.4% Non-Hispanic Black, 8.9% Non-Hispanic Asian, 0.9% Non-Hispanic Native American, 0.1% Non-Hispanic Pacific Islander, 0.3% Non-Hispanic Other Race, 3.7% Non-Hispanic Multiracial, and 25.7% Hispanic.

The White population continued to remain the largest racial category and included 24.1% of Hispanics in Lake County who identify as White. A plurality of Hispanics identified as Some Other Race (40.8%) with others continuing to identify as Multiracial (28.6%) and smaller amounts identifying as Black (2.9%), American Indian and Alaskan Native (3.3%), Asian (0.2%), and Hawaiian and Pacific Islander (0.1%). By ethnicity, 25.7% of the total population was Hispanic-Latino (of any race) and 74.3% is Non-Hispanic (of any race). If treated as a separate category, Hispanics are the largest minority group in Lake County, Illinois surpassing the Black population from the 1990 Census onward. The majority of Hispanic/ Latino residents in Lake County, Illinois are of Mexican descent (18.0% of the county population in 2021). There are also communities of Puerto Rican, Cuban, Central American, and South American ancestry in the county.

== Sports ==
The following sports teams play in Lake County:

- Lake County Fielders baseball (defunct)
- Lake County Coyotes baseball
- Lake County Legacy (The Basketball League) at Waukegan High School

== Sites of interest ==
=== Amusement parks ===
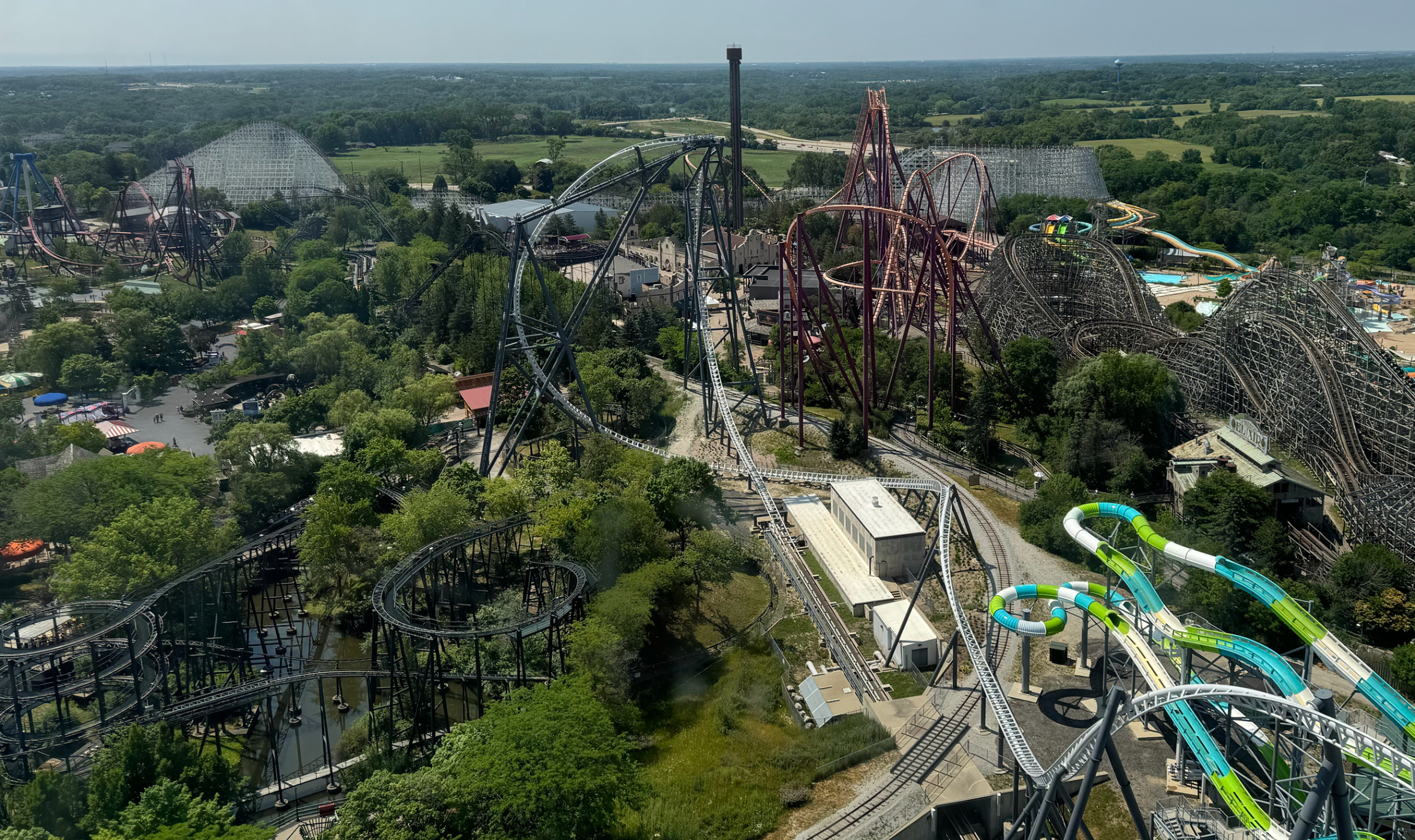
Six Flags Great America

- Six Flags Great America in Gurnee
- Six Flags Hurricane Harbor Chicago in Gurnee
- Lambs Farm in Libertyville

=== Museums ===
- Volo Auto Museum in Volo
- Bess Bower Dunn Museum in Libertyville
- Warbird Heritage Foundation in Waukegan
- Waukegan History Museum in Waukegan
- Raupp Museum in Buffalo Grove
- Shiloh House in Zion
- Fort Hill Memorial Museum in Mundelein
- Dunn Museum in Libertyville

=== Performing arts ===
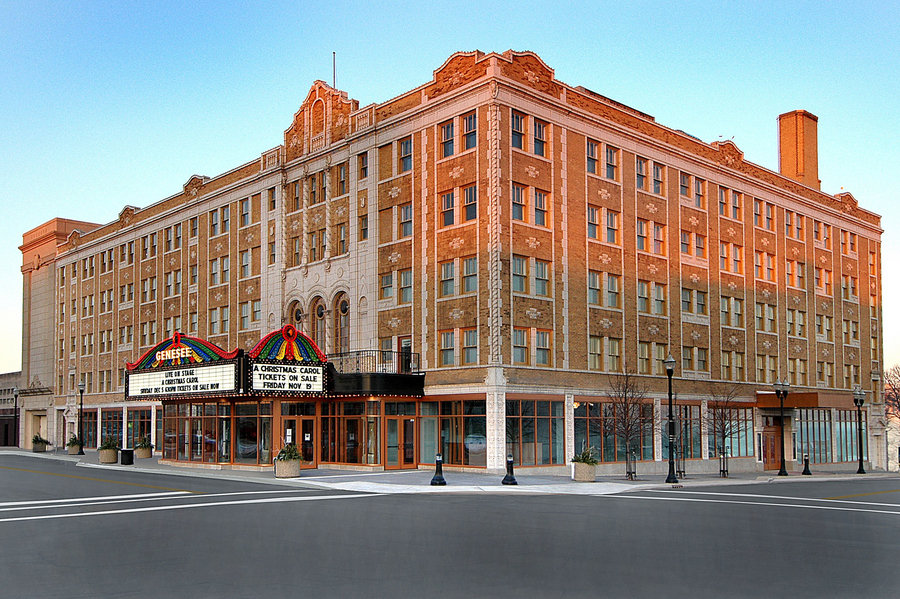
Genesee Theatre

- Adler Arts Center in Libertyville
- ArtWauk in Waukegan
- Clockwise Theatre in Waukegan
- Genesee Theatre in Waukegan
- James Lumber Center for Performing Arts in Grayslake
- Marriott Theatre in Lincolnshire
- Ravinia Festival in Highland Park

=== Other ===
- Naval Station Great Lakes
- Gurnee Mills shopping mall
- Lake Michigan

== Communities ==
=== Cities ===
- Highland Park
- Highwood
- Lake Forest
- North Chicago
- Park City
- Waukegan (county seat)
- Zion

=== Villages ===
- Antioch
- Bannockburn
- Barrington (part)
- Barrington Hills (part)
- Beach Park
- Buffalo Grove (mostly)
- Deerfield (mostly)
- Deer Park (part)
- Fox Lake (part)
- Fox River Grove (part)
- Grayslake
- Green Oaks
- Gurnee
- Hainesville
- Hawthorn Woods
- Indian Creek
- Island Lake (part)
- Kildeer
- Lake Barrington
- Lake Bluff
- Lake Villa
- Lake Zurich
- Lakemoor (mostly)
- Libertyville
- Lincolnshire
- Lindenhurst
- Long Grove
- Mettawa
- Mundelein
- North Barrington
- Old Mill Creek
- Port Barrington (part)
- Riverwoods
- Round Lake
- Round Lake Beach
- Round Lake Heights
- Round Lake Park
- Third Lake
- Tower Lakes
- Vernon Hills
- Volo
- Wadsworth
- Wauconda
- Wheeling (part)
- Winthrop Harbor

=== Census-designated places ===
- Channel Lake
- Forest Lake
- Fox Lake Hills
- Gages Lake
- Grandwood Park
- Knollwood
- Lake Catherine
- Long Lake
- Venetian Village

=== Unincorporated communities ===
- Aptakisic
- Diamond Lake
- Fort Sheridan
- Fremont Center
- Gilmer
- Grange Hall
- Grass Lake
- Half Day
- Ingleside
- Ivanhoe
- Kennedy
- Loon Lake
- Millburn
- Monaville
- Palm Beach
- Prairie View
- Rondout (Part of Lake Bluff)
- Rosecrans
- Russell
- Sylvan Lake
- Wilson

=== Townships ===
The county is divided into eighteen townships.

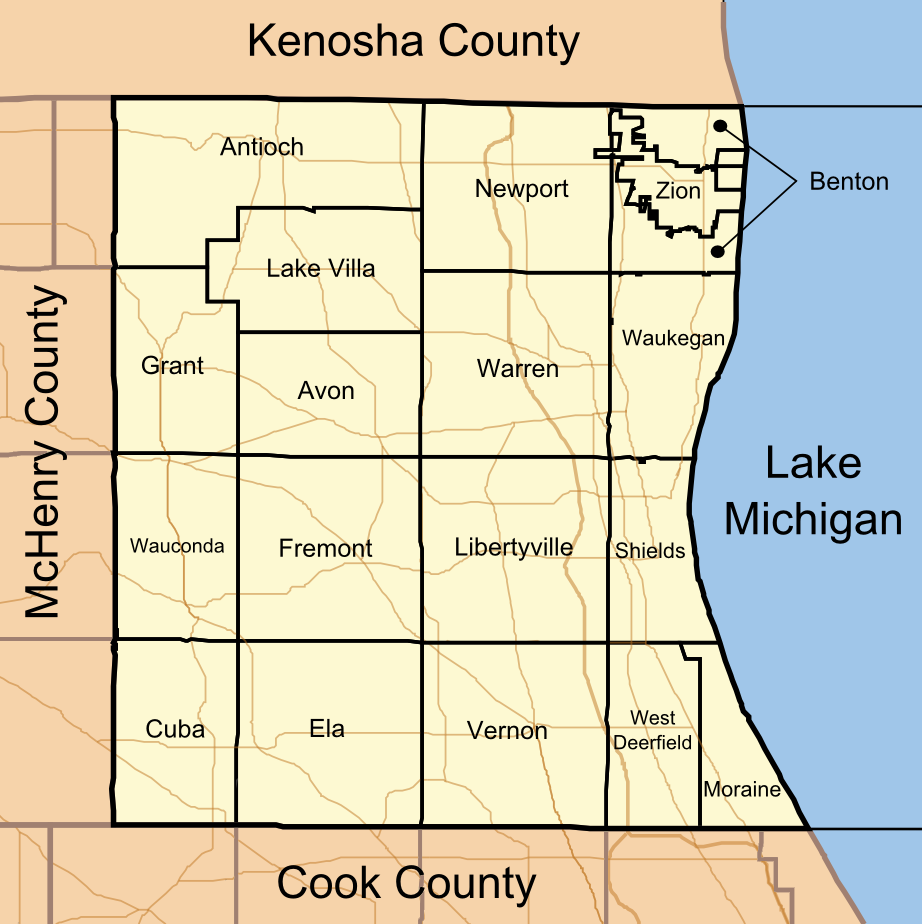
Lake County townships (clickable)

- Antioch
- Avon
- Benton
- Cuba
- Ela
- Fremont
- Grant
- Lake Villa
- Libertyville
- Moraine
- Newport
- Shields
- Vernon
- Warren
- Wauconda
- Waukegan
- West Deerfield
- Zion

== Government ==
Lake County Board
District	Board Member	Party
1	Linda Pedersen	Republican
2	Adam Schlick	Republican
3	Ann B. Maine	Republican
4	Gina Roberts	Democratic
5	J. Kevin Hunter	Republican
6	John Wasik	Democratic
7	Carissa Casbon	Democratic
8	Diane Hewitt	Democratic
9	Mary Ross Cunningham	Democratic
10	Jessica Vealitzek	Democratic
11	Paul Frank	Democratic
12	Paras Parekh	Democratic
13	Sandy Hart, Board Chair	Democratic
14	Angelo D. Kyle	Democratic
15	Jennifer Clark	Democratic
16	Esiah Campos	Democratic
17	Michael Danforth	Republican
18	Sara Knizhnik	Democratic
19	Marah Altenberg	Democratic

County Officials: The county has several other elected offices, including sheriff, coroner, clerk, treasurer, State's attorney, regional superintendent, and circuit court clerk. Each of these elected officers serves a term of four years and oversees a different part of county government.

Office	Officeholder	Party
Circuit Court Clerk	Erin Cartwright Weinstein	Democratic
Coroner	Jennifer Banek	Democratic
County Clerk	Anthony Vega	Democratic
Regional Superintendent of Schools	Michael L Karner	Democratic
Sheriff	John Idleburg	Democratic
State's Attorney	Eric Rinehart	Democratic
Treasurer	Holly Kim	Democratic

== Politics ==
As a historic Yankee settlement, Lake County was initially a stronghold of the Free Soil Party. In 1848, it was Free Soil nominee and former president Martin van Buren's strongest county, giving him over 58 percent of the vote.

Consequently, Lake County would turn rock-solid Republican for most of the next century and a half. After narrowly supporting Democrat Franklin Pierce in 1852, it voted Republican in all but one presidential election from 1856 to 1960. The sole exception was 1912, when the GOP was mortally divided and Lake County voted for Progressive Party nominee and former president Theodore Roosevelt over conservative incumbent William Howard Taft.

In 1964, the Republican Party nominated Barry Goldwater, whose hostility to the Yankee establishment and strongly conservative platform were sufficient to leave many traditional Republicans to stay home or even to vote for Lyndon B. Johnson. As a result, Johnson narrowly became the first Democrat to win an absolute majority in the county since James K. Polk in 1844, and the first to win it at all since Pierce in 1852. Between 1968 and 1988, however, Lake County became powerfully Republican once more, with no Democrat cracking forty percent of the vote.

However, as in the other collar counties, the Republican edge narrowed considerably in the 1990s. Bill Clinton actually won Lake with a 166-vote plurality in 1996, the only time that Clinton won any of the collar counties besides Will during his two campaigns for president. After narrowly voting for George W. Bush twice, Lake swung over dramatically in 2008 to support Democrat Barack Obama, who carried it by almost 20 points. Obama won it again during his reelection bid in 2012, albeit by a slimmer margin. Hillary Clinton won it handily in 2016, tallying her second-best margin in the state. At 36%, Donald Trump's performance in the county was the worst of any Republican presidential nominee since 1912. In 2020, Joe Biden won 61% of the vote, the highest percentage of the vote for any candidate since 1988 and the highest ever attained by a Democrat. In 2024, amidst a red wave, Kamala Harris won 59% of the vote, making Lake one of only two collar counties where Harris posted a better performance than Clinton, the other being McHenry.

Lake County has the highest payout for wrongful conviction in the United States. Juan Rivera was awarded $20 million, the largest wrongful conviction settlement in United States history, including $2 million from John E. Reid & Associates, who were known for the Reid technique of questioning suspects. This technique has been widely criticized for its history of eliciting confessions that were later determined to be false. Rivera was questioned twice at Reid headquarters by an employee of the company during his interrogation, which lasted for several days. Another payout was made to Jerry Hobbs. Kathleen Zellner settled Jerry Hobbs's civil rights case for $7.75 million. Hobbs was incarcerated for 66 months. This was the largest pre-trial detainee settlement in the United States.

United States presidential election results for Lake County, Illinois
Year	Republican		Democratic		Third party(ies)	
Year	No.	%	No.	%	No.	%
1892	2,932	57.17%	1,964	38.29%	233	4.54%
1896	5,027	72.47%	1,777	25.62%	133	1.92%
1900	5,136	67.69%	2,235	29.45%	217	2.86%
1904	6,635	77.11%	1,592	18.50%	378	4.39%
1908	6,392	68.15%	2,264	24.14%	723	7.71%
1912	2,183	21.59%	2,436	24.09%	5,494	54.33%
1916	12,905	66.95%	5,447	28.26%	924	4.79%
1920	15,712	82.28%	2,321	12.15%	1,063	5.57%
1924	18,229	75.48%	2,008	8.31%	3,913	16.20%
1928	26,814	67.73%	12,252	30.95%	521	1.32%
1932	23,994	50.92%	21,139	44.86%	1,989	4.22%
1936	27,548	51.32%	24,524	45.69%	1,603	2.99%
1940	38,242	60.26%	24,965	39.34%	254	0.40%
1944	35,674	58.19%	25,453	41.52%	183	0.30%
1948	39,456	63.26%	22,192	35.58%	720	1.15%
1952	54,929	62.83%	32,353	37.01%	145	0.17%
1956	66,781	67.33%	32,279	32.54%	129	0.13%
1960	67,809	59.02%	46,941	40.85%	149	0.13%
1964	58,840	48.36%	62,785	51.60%	42	0.03%
1968	68,999	56.60%	43,409	35.61%	9,495	7.79%
1972	92,052	65.84%	47,416	33.91%	344	0.25%
1976	92,231	60.32%	57,741	37.77%	2,922	1.91%
1980	96,350	58.45%	48,287	29.29%	20,216	12.26%
1984	118,401	68.35%	53,947	31.14%	876	0.51%
1988	114,115	63.53%	64,327	35.81%	1,191	0.66%
1992	99,000	44.20%	81,693	36.47%	43,294	19.33%
1996	93,149	45.49%	93,315	45.57%	18,300	8.94%
2000	120,988	49.96%	115,058	47.51%	6,118	2.53%
2004	139,081	50.52%	134,352	48.80%	1,862	0.68%
2008	118,545	39.53%	177,242	59.10%	4,113	1.37%
2012	129,764	45.14%	153,757	53.48%	3,972	1.38%
2016	109,767	36.16%	171,095	56.37%	22,658	7.47%
2020	123,594	36.82%	204,032	60.78%	8,049	2.40%
2024	120,402	38.40%	184,642	58.89%	8,514	2.72%

== Media ==
Lake County is covered by the Chicago and Milwaukee media market and the county relies on Chicago and Milwaukee television stations, radio stations, and newspapers for the source of its news and information.

The county has multiple radio stations, including 102.3 FM XLC and 98.3 FM WRLR.

The Lake County News-Sun, owned by Tribune Publishing, is the county's main print newspaper. It is printed and published in Gurnee.

Lake and McHenry County Scanner, launched in 2012 by Sam Borcia, is the county's biggest digital newspaper which covers Lake County as well as nearby McHenry County. The publication's work has been quoted in top news outlets such as Fox News and Yahoo! News.

The county is also covered by the Chicago Sun-Times and The Daily Herald.

== Education ==
The following is a list of school districts with any territory in Lake County, no matter how slight, even if the school districts' administrative headquarters and/or schools are outside of the county:

K-12:

- Barrington Community Unit School District 220
- Lake Zurich Community Unit School District 95
- North Chicago School District 187
- Round Lake Community Unit School District 116
- Wauconda Community Unit School District 118
- Waukegan Community Unit School District 60

Secondary:

- Antioch Community High School District 117
- Community High School District 155
- Grant Community High School District 124
- Grayslake Community High School District 127
- Lake Forest Community High School District 115
- Libertyville Community High School District 128
- Mundelein Consolidated High School District 120
- Richmond-Burton Community High School District 157
- Adlai E. Stevenson High School District 125
- Township High School District 113
- Warren Township High School District 121
- Zion-Benton Township High School District 126

Elementary:

- Antioch Community Consolidated School District 34
- Aptakisic-Tripp Community Consolidated School District 102
- Bannockburn School District 106
- Beach Park Community Consolidated School District 3
- Big Hollow School District 38
- Cary Community Consolidated School District 26
- Deerfield School District 109
- Diamond Lake School District 76
- Emmons School District 33
- Fox Lake Grade School District 114
- Fremont School District 79
- Gavin School District 37
- Grass Lake School District 36
- Grayslake Consolidated Community School District 46
- Gurnee School District 56
- Hawthorn Community Consolidated School District 73
- Kildeer Countryside Community Consolidated School District 96
- Lake Bluff Elementary School District 65
- Lake Forest School District 67
- Lake Villa Community Consolidated School District 41
- Libertyville School District 70
- Lincolnshire-Prairie View School District 103
- McHenry Community Consolidated School District 15
- Millburn Community Consolidated School District 24
- Mundelein Elementary School District 75
- North Shore School District 112
- Nippersink School District 2
- Oak Grove School District 68
- Rondout School District 72
- Winthrop Harbor School District 1
- Woodland Community Consolidated School District 50
- Zion Elementary School District 6

== Notable people ==
- Jack Benny (February 14, 1894 – December 26, 1974) – entertainer, comedian, actor and musician, Benny was one of America's greatest stars of radio and television, and also appeared in many films; he was raised in Waukegan, Illinois.
- Charles Boyce (September 21, 1949) – cartoonist, creator of syndicated comic panel Compu-toon and the telecommunication public affairs image The KeyPad Kid.
- Ray Bradbury (August 22, 1920 – June 5, 2012) – fantasy, horror, science fiction, and mystery writer. Best known for his dystopian novel Fahrenheit 451 and The Martian Chronicles, Bradbury is widely considered one of the greatest and most popular American writers of speculative fiction of the twentieth century. Bradbury was born in Waukegan.
- Marlon Brando (April 3, 1924 – July 1, 2004) actor; as a young sex symbol, he is best known for his roles in A Streetcar Named Desire, On the Waterfront and Guys and Dolls. Brando and his family moved to Libertyville, Illinois where he lived from 1937 until 1942.
- Gary Coleman (February 8, 1968 – May 28, 2010) – actor, known for his role as Arnold Jackson in the American sitcom Diff'rent Strokes (1978–1986). Coleman was born in Zion, Illinois.
- Ron Goldman (July 2, 1968 – June 12, 1994), who was killed along with Nicole Brown Simpson grew up in Buffalo Grove.
- Michael Jordan (born February 17, 1963) – retired professional basketball player and active businessman, widely considered one of the greatest players of all time; as of 2015, Jordan had a residence in Highland Park, Illinois.
- Vince Vaughn (born March 28, 1970) – actor, known for his roles in Swingers and Wedding Crashers; grew up in Buffalo Grove, Illinois, then moved to Lake Forest, Illinois, where he graduated from Lake Forest High School in 1988.
- Pete Wilson (born August 23, 1933), mayor of San Diego (1971–1983); United States Senator from California (1983–1991); and Governor of California (1991–1999), born in Lake Forest.
- Thomas E. Wilson (1868–1958), businessman and founder of 'Wilson Sporting Goods', resident and buried in Lake County.

== See also ==
- IL-53 extension issue
- List of school districts in Lake County, Illinois
- National Register of Historic Places listings in Lake County, Illinois
