= Long Lake, Illinois =

- Census-designated place
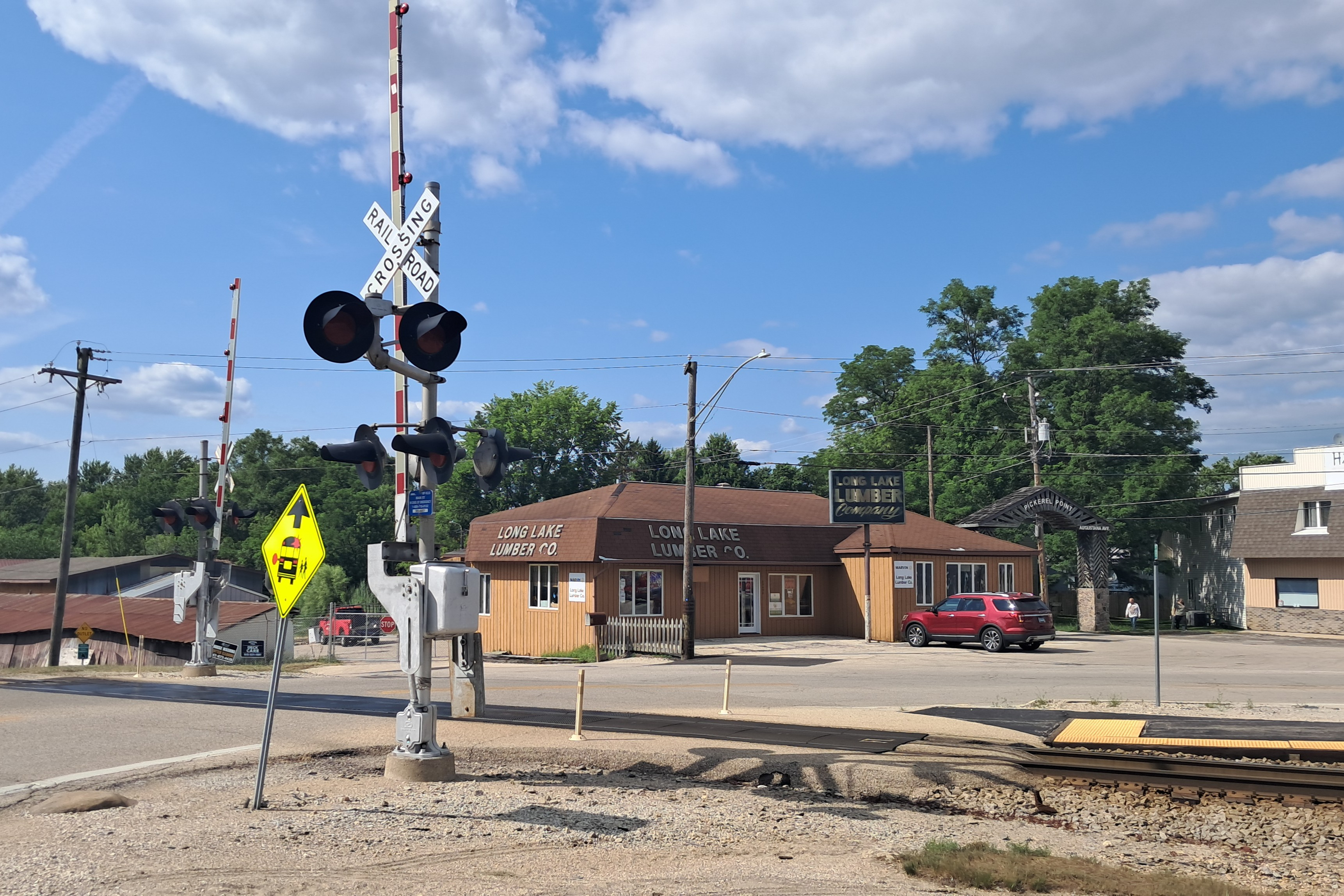

- Location in Illinois Location in the United States
- Coordinates: 42°22′28″N 88°07′40″W
- Country: United States
- State: Illinois
- County: Lake
- Townships: Grant, Avon, Lake Villa

Area
  - Total: 1.78 sq mi (4.61 km^{2})
  - Land: 1.18 sq mi (3.06 km^{2})
  - Water: 0.60 sq mi (1.55 km^{2})
- Elevation: 738 ft (225 m)

Population (2020)
  - Total: 3,663
  - Density: 3,104.1/sq mi (1,198.51/km^{2})
- Time zone: UTC-6 (CST)
  - Summer (DST): UTC-5 (CDT)
- ZIP code: 60041
- Area code(s): 847, 224
- FIPS code: 17-44550
- GNIS feature ID: 2393107

Long Lake is an unincorporated community and census-designated place (CDP) in Lake County, Illinois, United States. Per the 2020 census, the population was 3,663.

== Geography ==
The community is in western Lake County and nearly surrounds Long Lake, which drains northwest via Manitou Creek to Fox Lake, part of the Chain O'Lakes of northern Illinois. The CDP is bordered to the northeast by the village of Round Lake Heights and to the east and south by the village of Round Lake Beach. The CDP is primarily in the eastern part of Grant Township, with a smaller portion in the northwest corner of Avon Township, and an area of about one city block in the southwest corner of Lake Villa Township.

Illinois Route 134 runs along the southern edge of the CDP, leading west 2 miles (3 km) to U.S. Route 12 in the southern part of Fox Lake and southeast through Round Lake Beach 3.5 miles (5.6 km) to Hainesville. Long Lake is 46 miles (74 km) northwest of downtown Chicago.

According to the 2021 census gazetteer files, Long Lake has a total area of 1.78 square miles (4.61 km^{2}), of which 1.18 square miles (3.06 km^{2}) (or 66.29%) is land and 0.60 square miles (1.55 km^{2}) (or 33.71%) is water.

== Demographics ==
Historical population
Census	Pop.	Note	%±
2000	3,356		—
2010	3,515		4.7%
2020	3,663		4.2%
U.S. Decennial Census; 2010 2020

=== Racial and ethnic composition ===
Long Lake CDP, Illinois – Racial and ethnic composition Note: the US Census treats Hispanic/Latino as an ethnic category. This table excludes Latinos from the racial categories and assigns them to a separate category. Hispanics/Latinos may be of any race.
Race / Ethnicity (NH = Non-Hispanic)	Pop 2000	Pop 2010	Pop 2020	% 2000	% 2010	% 2020
White alone (NH)	2,893	2,391	2,125	86.20%	68.02%	58.01%
Black or African American alone (NH)	11	42	59	0.33%	1.19%	1.61%
Native American or Alaska Native alone (NH)	11	9	9	0.33%	0.26%	0.25%
Asian alone (NH)	24	20	21	0.72%	0.57%	0.57%
Native Hawaiian or Pacific Islander alone (NH)	0	3	0	0.00%	0.09%	0.00%
Other race alone (NH)	3	1	25	0.09%	0.03%	0.68%
Mixed race or Multiracial (NH)	27	61	152	0.80%	1.74%	4.15%
Hispanic or Latino (any race)	387	988	1,272	11.53%	28.11%	34.73%
Total	3,356	3,515	3,663	100.00%	100.00%	100.00%

=== 2020 census ===
As of the 2020 census, Long Lake had a population of 3,663. The median age was 37.7 years. 23.0% of residents were under the age of 18 and 12.3% were 65 years of age or older. For every 100 females there were 109.9 males, and for every 100 females age 18 and over there were 105.8 males age 18 and over.

100.0% of residents lived in urban areas, while 0.0% lived in rural areas.

There were 1,288 households in Long Lake, of which 33.2% had children under the age of 18 living in them. Of all households, 50.6% were married-couple households, 19.2% were households with a male householder and no spouse or partner present, and 20.1% were households with a female householder and no spouse or partner present. About 23.9% of all households were made up of individuals, and 9.8% had someone living alone who was 65 years of age or older.

There were 1,429 housing units, of which 9.9% were vacant. The homeowner vacancy rate was 2.3% and the rental vacancy rate was 6.5%. The average household size was 3.59 and the average family size was 3.17. The population density was 2,057.87 inhabitants per square mile (794.55/km^{2}). Housing units were at an average density of 802.81 per square mile (309.97/km^{2}).

=== Income and poverty ===
The median income for a household in the CDP was $95,764, and the median income for a family was $96,944. Males had a median income of $30,042 versus $44,912 for females. The per capita income for the CDP was $28,627. About 5.8% of families and 5.8% of the population were below the poverty line, including 8.9% of those under age 18 and 0.0% of those age 65 or over.

== Transportation ==
The Long Lake station provides Metra commuter rail service along the Milwaukee District North Line. Trains connect Long Lake to Chicago Union Station, Fox Lake station and points in between.

Pace provides bus service on Route 570 connecting Long Lake to Fox Lake, Grayslake, and other destinations.
