= Chain O'Lakes State Park =

Chain O'Lakes State Park can refer to either of two state parks in the United States:

- Chain O'Lakes State Park (Illinois)
- Chain O'Lakes State Park (Indiana)
