= Ingleside, Illinois =

- Unincorporated community
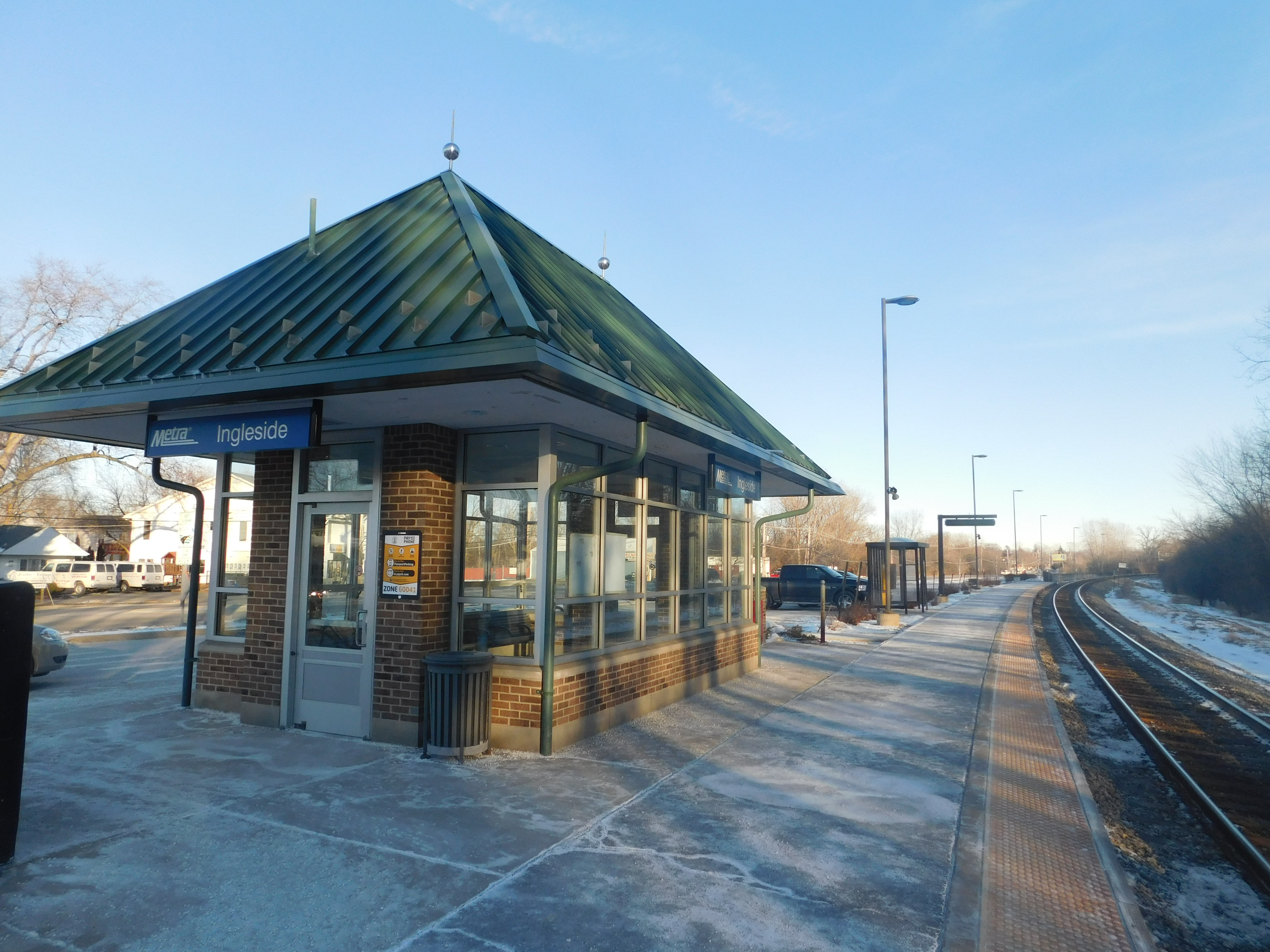
- Ingleside Metra station

- Location in Illinois Location in the United States
- Coordinates: 42°22′51″N 88°08′19″W
- Country: United States
- State: Illinois
- County: Lake
- Township: Grant

Area
  - Total: 11.98 sq mi (31.0 km^{2})
  - Land: 11.44 sq mi (29.6 km^{2})
  - Water: 0.54 sq mi (1.4 km^{2})

Population (2000)
  - Total: 9,286
  - Density: 811.7/sq mi (313.4/km^{2})
- Time zone: UTC-6 (CST)
  - Summer (DST): UTC-5 (CDT)
- ZIP Code: 60041
- Area code: 847/224
- GNIS feature ID: 410897

Ingleside is an unincorporated community in Lake County, Illinois, United States. Ingleside is between Fox Lake, Round Lake Heights, and Lake Villa.

== Geography ==
Ingleside is on Manitou Creek between Long Lake, Duck Lake, and Fox Lake.

Ingleside lies below the Long Lake Dam and above Fox Lake. Duck Lake and most of the Long Lake area are part of Ingleside. Ingleside also goes northeast to Lake Villa.

Notable locations include the Old Grant Township Hall (home of the Grant Township Museum), the Long Lake Dam and the Fox Lake bike trail.

The primary elementary school districts are Gavin School District 37 and Big Hollow School District 38.

In the 1960s, mammoth bones were found in Ingleside. They are on display at the Lakes Region Historical Society Museum, in Antioch.

In 2008, the Long Lake Dam was rebuilt and modernized. The dam was built in 1930 and reinforced in 1968 and 2008. The Long Lake Dam allows the control of water flowing from Long Lake to Fox Lake and allows pleasure boat traffic from Long Lake to the rest of the Chain O'Lakes.

== Transportation ==
Ingleside is served by Metra commuter train's Milwaukee District North Line connecting to downtown Chicago.

== Demographics ==
As of the 2000 United States census, there were 9,286 people living in the village. The population density was 811.89 inhabitants per square mile (313.47/km^{2}). There were 3,660 housing units. The racial makeup of the village was 75.1% White, 12.3% African American, 0.9% Native American, 3.6% Asian, 0.1% Pacific Islander, 5.5% from other races, and 2.4% from two or more races. Hispanic or Latino of any race were 4.2% of the population.

== Notable people ==
- Daniel Dennis, Olympic wrestler (2016)
- William J. Stratton (1886–1938), Illinois Secretary of State
- William Stratton (1914–2001), 32nd governor of Illinois (1953–1961)
