= Fox Lake Hills, Illinois =

Fox Lake Hills
- Census-designated place
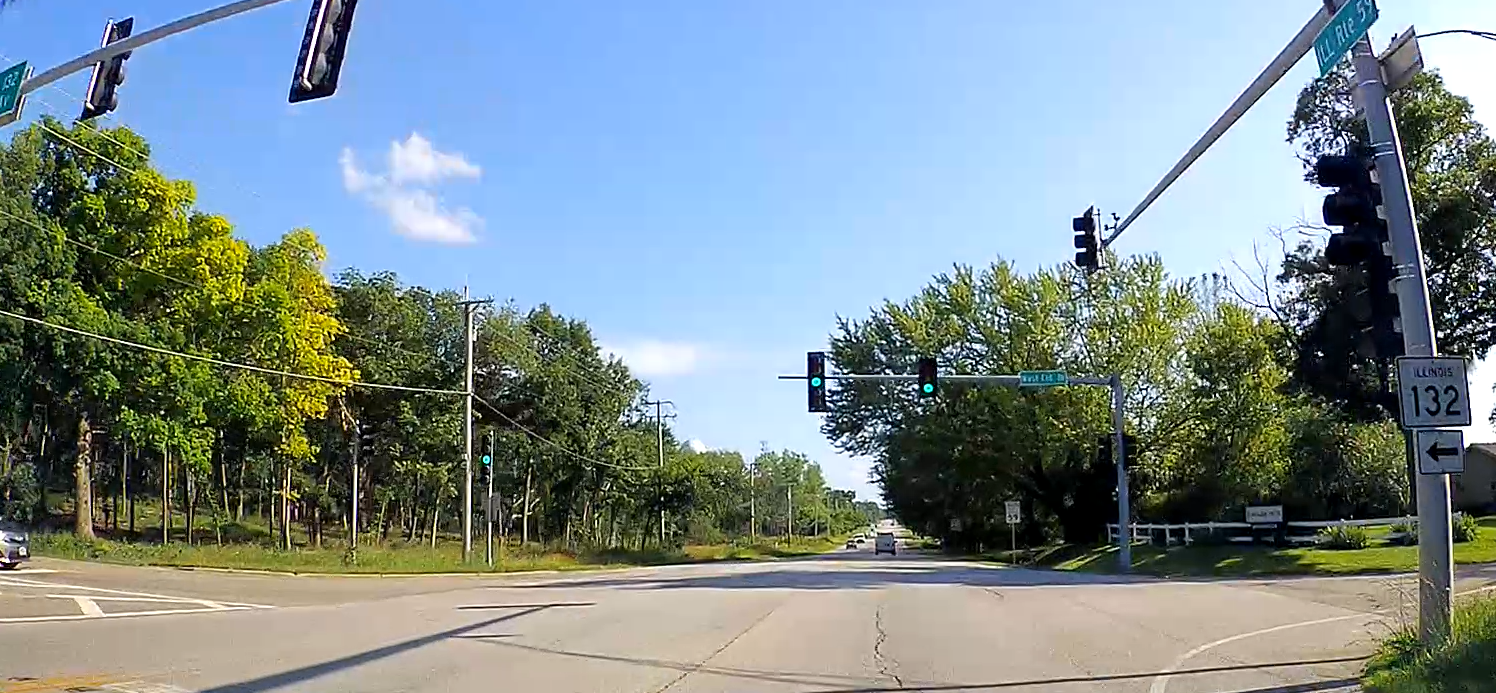
- Illinois Route 59 at Illinois Route 132

- Location in Illinois Location in the United States
- Coordinates: 42°24′47″N 88°07′25″W
- Country: United States
- State: Illinois
- County: Lake
- Township: Lake Villa

Area
  - Total: 1.81 sq mi (4.68 km^{2})
  - Land: 1.27 sq mi (3.28 km^{2})
  - Water: 0.54 sq mi (1.40 km^{2})
- Elevation: 748 ft (228 m)

Population (2020)
  - Total: 2,684
  - Density: 2,116/sq mi (817.1/km^{2})
- Time zone: UTC-6 (CST)
  - Summer (DST): UTC-5 (CDT)
- ZIP code: 60046
- Area code(s): 847, 224
- FIPS code: 17-27455
- GNIS feature ID: 2393009

Fox Lake Hills is an unincorporated community and census-designated place (CDP) in Lake Villa Township, Lake County, Illinois, United States. Per the 2020 census, the population was 2,684.

== Geography ==
Fox Lake Hills is located in northwestern Lake County. It is in the western part of Lake Villa Township and is bordered to the southwest by Grant Township and to the northwest by Antioch Township. The community is on the eastern shore of Fox Lake, including parts of Columbia Bay and Stanton Bay.

According to the 2021 census gazetteer files, Fox Lake Hills has a total area of 1.81 square miles (4.69 km^{2}), of which 1.27 square miles (3.29 km^{2}) (or 70.13%) is land and 0.54 square miles (1.40 km^{2}) (or 29.87%) is water.

== Demographics ==
Historical population
Census	Pop.	Note	%±
2000	2,561		—
2010	2,591		1.2%
2020	2,684		3.6%
U.S. Decennial Census; 2010 2020

=== Racial and ethnic composition ===
Fox Lake Hills CDP, Illinois – Racial and ethnic composition Note: the US Census treats Hispanic/Latino as an ethnic category. This table excludes Latinos from the racial categories and assigns them to a separate category. Hispanics/Latinos may be of any race.
Race / Ethnicity (NH = Non-Hispanic)	Pop 2000	Pop 2010	Pop 2020	% 2000	% 2010	% 2020
White alone (NH)	2,407	2,328	2,169	93.99%	89.85%	80.81%
Black or African American alone (NH)	25	51	33	0.98%	1.97%	1.23%
Native American or Alaska Native alone (NH)	3	3	0	0.12%	0.12%	0.00%
Asian alone (NH)	15	18	27	0.59%	0.69%	1.01%
Native Hawaiian or Pacific Islander alone (NH)	0	0	0	0.00%	0.00%	0.00%
Other race alone (NH)	0	0	6	0.00%	0.00%	0.22%
Mixed race or Multiracial (NH)	36	24	78	1.41%	0.93%	2.91%
Hispanic or Latino (any race)	75	167	371	2.93%	6.45%	13.82%
Total	2,561	2,591	2,684	100.00%	100.00%	100.00%

=== 2020 census ===
As of the 2020 census, Fox Lake Hills had a population of 2,684. There were 716 families residing in the CDP. The population density was 1,484.51 inhabitants per square mile (573.17/km^{2}), and there were 1,085 housing units at an average density of 600.11 per square mile (231.70/km^{2}).

The median age was 41.5 years. 21.9% of residents were under the age of 18 and 16.4% were 65 years of age or older. For every 100 females, there were 101.5 males, and for every 100 females age 18 and over, there were 100.1 males age 18 and over.

There were 1,016 households, of which 31.0% had children under the age of 18 living in them. Of all households, 54.4% were married-couple households, 17.2% were households with a male householder and no spouse or partner present, and 20.9% were households with a female householder and no spouse or partner present. About 21.3% of all households were made up of individuals, and 8.3% had someone living alone who was 65 years of age or older. The average household size was 2.68 and the average family size was 2.38.

100.0% of residents lived in urban areas, while 0.0% lived in rural areas.

Of the 1,085 housing units, 6.4% were vacant. The homeowner vacancy rate was 1.4% and the rental vacancy rate was 6.4%.

=== Income and poverty ===
The median income for a household in the CDP was $82,548, and the median income for a family was $91,250. Males had a median income of $65,391 versus $35,313 for females. The per capita income for the CDP was $38,741. About 4.5% of families and 10.0% of the population were below the poverty line, including 26.5% of those under age 18 and 0.0% of those age 65 or over.
