= Big Hollow School District 38 =

School district in Illinois, United States

Location
- 26051 W. Nippersink Rd. Ingleside IL 60041 (Grant Township, Lake County, Illinois) ROE 34 United States
- Coordinates: 42.349°N 88.1425°W

District information
- Type: Public
- Motto: Believing in higher standards
- Grades: PreK–8
- Established: 1836; 190 years ago
- Superintendent: Bob Gold
- Schools: 3 schools on 1 campus
- Budget: $23,414,636
- NCES District ID: 1706270

Students and staff
- Students: 1754 (as of 2018)
- Teachers: 117 (FTE as of 2019)
- Student–teacher ratio: 18.4 (as of 2018)

Other information
- Website: www.bighollow.us

Big Hollow School District 38 is a school district in Grant Township, Lake County, Illinois. The district includes parts of the villages of Fox Lake, Lakemoor, Round Lake, and Volo. Since 2007, it has had a single 62-acre (25 ha) campus, at the corner of Fish Lake and Nippersink roads in Ingleside, with three schools: Big Hollow Primary School, Big Hollow Elementary School, and Big Hollow Middle School.

== History ==
According to the district's website, the school district has been in operation since 1836.

Around 1850 a 4th of an acre on the corner of what now is U.S. Route 12 and Illinois Route 134 in Ingleside near the village of Fox Lake was donated by Mr. William B. D for a school in the big geographical hollow. They put up a log cabin with the desks fastened to the wall, with the teachers desk in the middle of the room. The building was heated by a wood stove and had few books. Teachers were originally paid with meat and then would sell the meat to someone for money.

Then in 1873 the building was replaced with a frame building and the district bought more land. on the new building there was a blackboard and a bench around the stove in the middle of the room to keep the kids warm.

In 1917 the building was once again remolded with new windows, desks and stove.

In the 1940s, a new Big Hollow School was built on the southeast corner of the intersection. Additions were made in the 1950s and 1960s. Taverne Middle School was built to the south of Big Hollow School in 1972.

The district experienced a population boom in the 1990s and 2000s. Ron Pazanin, who had served as school superintendent since 1990, retired in June 2012; in the 22 years that he was superintendent, the school system grew from 305 students to 1780, and from 18 teachers to 150 members of faculty and staff.

The newest campus, on Nippersink Road, began operation in 2000 with only Big Hollow Primary School for kindergarten through second grade. Big Hollow Elementary School, for third through fifth grade, opened on the campus in August 2006. Big Hollow Middle School, for sixth through eighth grades, opened in January 2007, Taverine Middle School having closed in December 2006.

In January 2011, the district had the two school buildings on the U.S. 12/Illinois 134 site torn down and, in May 2012, arranged to sell the property to Interstate Partners for $2.8 million.

== Fine Arts Program ==
Big Hollow has many different fine art programs including plays, musicals, choirs, bands, set crew, art club, and speech & acting team. The Choirs and Bands have a total of 8 unique concerts. The fall 6-8th grade band and choir concert, the 5th grade band and choir concert, the holiday choir concert, the winter band concert, the 5th & 6th grade spring concert, the 7-12th grade MIOSM concert hosted by Grant Community High School, the 5-8th grade band theme concert. and the 5-8th grade choir pops concert. There is also a variety show in the fall and 3 speech and acting showcases throughout the school year.

The Musicals and plays performed at Big Hollow Middle School as of February 13.
Year	Musical	Play
2010/2011	Alice in Wonderland Jr.	Law & Order Fairy Tale Unit
2011/2012	The Wiz Jr.	Romeo & Winifred
2012/2013	Honk Jr.	The Emperor's Birthday Suit
2013/2014	Guys and Dolls Jr.	Captain Bree: Scourge of the Sea
2014/2015	Shrek Jr. The Musical	The Aliens are Coming! The Aliens are Coming!
2015/2016	Peter Pan Jr. The Musical	The Fearsome Pirate Frank
2016/2017	Captain Louie Jr.	The Snow White Variety Show
2017/2018	Bye Bye Birdie	Unwrapped
2018/2019	The Lion King Jr.	A Super Groovy Night's Dream
2019/2020	Into The Woods Jr.	
2020/2021	Left To Our Own Devices	Objection! Disorder in the Court!
2021/2022	Matilda Jr.	Haphazardly Ever After
2022/2023	Frozen Jr.	It's A Madhouse!
2023/2024	High School Musical Jr.	Channeling Grimm
2024/2025	The Little Mermaid Jr.	Night at the Wax Museum
2025/2026	Beauty and the Beast Jr.	The Day the Internet Died
2026/2027	Charlie and the Chocolate Factory Jr.	

== Big Hollow Athletics ==
Big hollow middle school has many different athletic programs there is volleyball, soccer, cheer-leading, cross country, basketball, wrestling, track & field, and POMS dance team.
