= Venetian Village, Illinois =

- Census-designated place
- Location in Illinois Location in the United States
- Coordinates: 42°24′04″N 88°02′48″W
- Country: United States
- State: Illinois
- County: Lake
- Township: Lake Villa

Area
  - Total: 2.38 sq mi (6.17 km^{2})
  - Land: 1.77 sq mi (4.59 km^{2})
  - Water: 0.61 sq mi (1.58 km^{2})
- Elevation: 778 ft (237 m)

Population (2020)
  - Total: 2,761
  - Density: 1,560/sq mi (601/km^{2})
- Time zone: UTC-6 (CST)
  - Summer (DST): UTC-5 (CDT)
- FIPS code: 17-77460
- GNIS feature ID: 2393831

Venetian Village is a census-designated place (CDP) in Lake County, Illinois, United States. Per the 2020 census, the population was 2,761.

== Geography ==
Venetian Village is located in northwestern Lake County in the southeast part of Lake Villa Township. It consists of several neighborhoods adjacent to four lakes: Sand Lake, Slough Lake, Miltmore Lake, and Fourth Lake. The neighborhood of Venetian Village is in the eastern part of the CDP, while West Miltmore is in the west.

Illinois Route 83 runs along the western edge of the CDP, leading north 1 mile (1.6 km) to the center of Lake Villa and south 4 miles (6 km) to Grayslake. Illinois Route 132 passes the northern edge of Venetian Village, leading west into Lake Villa and southeast 8 miles (13 km) to Gurnee.

According to the 2021 census gazetteer files, Venetian Village has a total area of 2.38 square miles (6.16 km^{2}), of which 1.77 square miles (4.58 km^{2}) (or 74.41%) is land and 0.61 square miles (1.58 km^{2}) (or 25.59%) is water.

== Demographics ==
Historical population
Census	Pop.	Note	%±
2000	3,082		—
2010	2,826		−8.3%
2020	2,761		−2.3%
U.S. Decennial Census; 2010 2020

=== Racial and ethnic composition ===
Venetian Village CDP, Illinois – Racial and ethnic composition Note: the US Census treats Hispanic/Latino as an ethnic category. This table excludes Latinos from the racial categories and assigns them to a separate category. Hispanics/Latinos may be of any race.
Race / Ethnicity (NH = Non-Hispanic)	Pop 2000	Pop 2010	Pop 2020	% 2000	% 2010	% 2020
White alone (NH)	2,837	2,569	2,128	92.05%	90.91%	77.07%
Black or African American alone (NH)	35	21	52	1.14%	0.74%	1.88%
Native American or Alaska Native alone (NH)	2	1	2	0.06%	0.04%	0.07%
Asian alone (NH)	24	34	31	0.78%	1.20%	1.12%
Native Hawaiian or Pacific Islander alone (NH)	0	0	0	0.00%	0.00%	0.00%
Other race alone (NH)	15	5	8	0.49%	0.18%	0.29%
Mixed race or Multiracial (NH)	45	26	107	1.46%	0.92%	3.88%
Hispanic or Latino (any race)	124	170	433	4.02%	6.02%	15.68%
Total	3,082	2,826	2,761	100.00%	100.00%	100.00%

=== 2020 census ===
As of the 2020 census, Venetian Village had a population of 2,761. The median age was 40.2 years. 21.9% of residents were under the age of 18 and 15.3% of residents were 65 years of age or older. For every 100 females there were 106.7 males, and for every 100 females age 18 and over there were 108.2 males age 18 and over.

100.0% of residents lived in urban areas, while 0.0% lived in rural areas.

There were 1,083 households in Venetian Village, of which 29.2% had children under the age of 18 living in them. Of all households, 52.3% were married-couple households, 19.9% were households with a male householder and no spouse or partner present, and 19.0% were households with a female householder and no spouse or partner present. About 24.5% of all households were made up of individuals and 9.5% had someone living alone who was 65 years of age or older. The average household size was 3.29 and the average family size was 2.73.

The age distribution included 8.2% aged 18 to 24, 27.9% aged 25 to 44, and 29.4% aged 45 to 64.

The population density was 1,158.14 inhabitants per square mile (447.16/km^{2}). There were 1,149 housing units at an average density of 481.96 per square mile (186.09/km^{2}), of which 5.7% were vacant. The homeowner vacancy rate was 0.8% and the rental vacancy rate was 4.3%.

=== Income and poverty ===
The median income for a household in the CDP was $82,631, and the median income for a family was $86,406. Males had a median income of $52,361 versus $29,231 for females. The per capita income for the CDP was $32,825. About 2.2% of families and 1.8% of the population were below the poverty line, including 0.0% of those under age 18 and 4.0% of those age 65 or over.
