= Chain O'Lakes =

Waterway system in northeast Illinois, US

Coordinates: 42°24′N 88°8′W

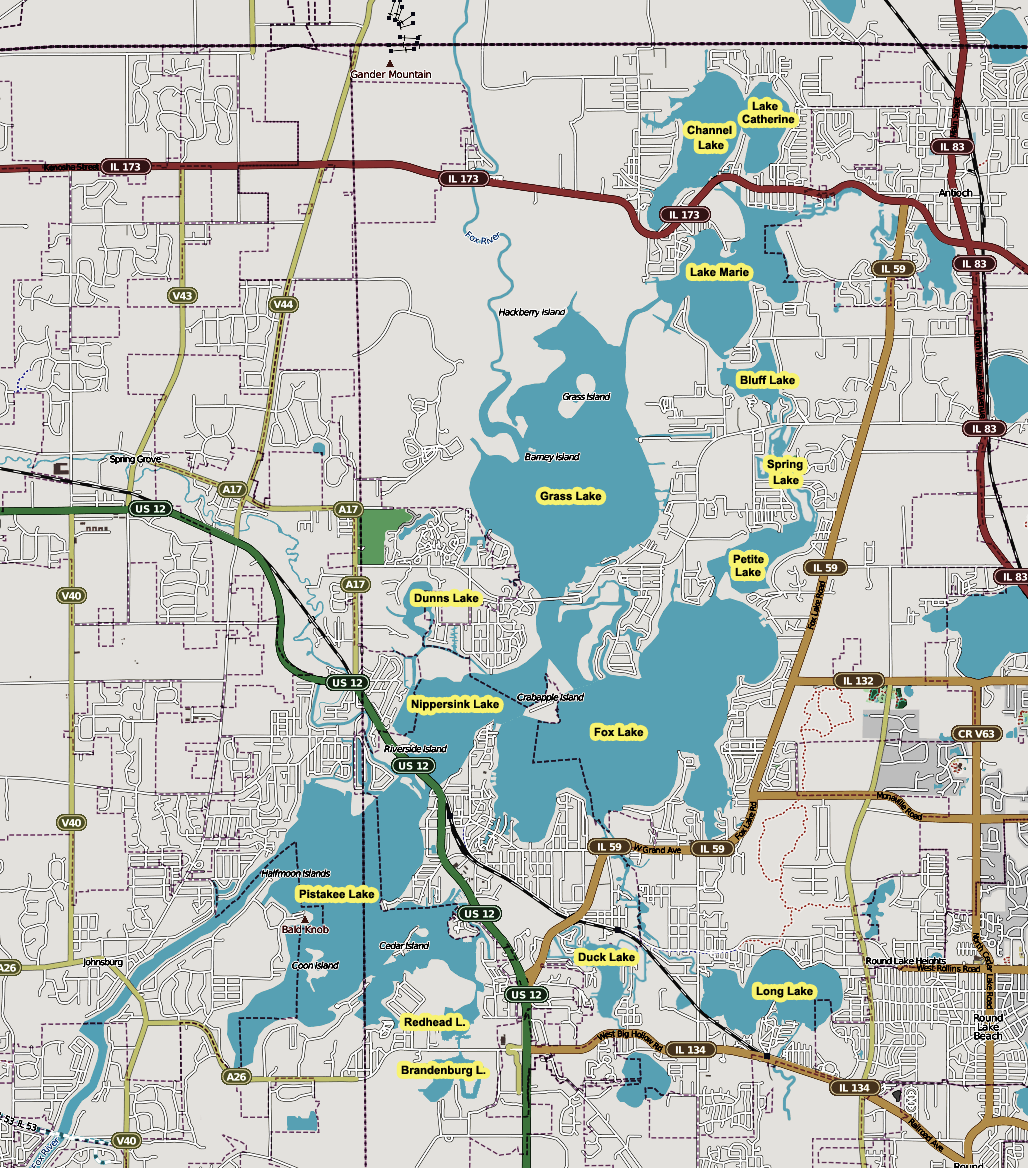
Chain O'Lakes map

The Chain O'Lakes, or simply "The Chain", is a waterway system in northeast Illinois composed of 15 lakes connected by the Fox River and man-made channels. Encompassing more than 7,100 acres (29 km^{2}) of water, 488 miles (785 km) of shoreline and 45 miles (72 km) of river, the Chain is the busiest inland recreational waterway per acre in the United States.

Located in Lake County and McHenry County, and being a popular outdoor recreation area for the Chicago and Milwaukee metro areas, the lakes have drawn weekend crowds of 30,000 and holiday crowds of more than 100,000 people. Chain O'Lakes State Park borders three lakes at the northwest corner of the system. The Fox Waterway Agency, a special local governing body, is responsible for oversight of the Chain O'Lakes.

== Geography ==
The Chain O'Lakes is composed of ten lakes connected by the Fox River and another five lakes by small canals and channels (with limited access). Of the ten lakes connected by the Fox River, three of the lakes are natural water bodies: Grass Lake, Lake Marie and Nippersink Lake. The other seven lakes connected by the Fox River are Bluff Lake, Fox Lake, Pistakee Lake, Channel Lake, Petite Lake, Lake Catherine and Redhead Lake. The remaining five lakes of the system are Duck Lake, Long Lake, Spring Lake, Dunns Lake and Brandenburg Lake.

The Chain O'Lakes system begins at the Illinois/Wisconsin border. The Fox River travels down near the border between McHenry County and Lake County in Illinois as it flows from the state border to Grass Lake, the first lake in the Chain. Grass Lake is the shallowest lake on the Chain, with an average depth of 3 feet (0.91 m) but is the third largest lake on the Chain, with an approximate area of 1,360 acres (5.5 km^{2}). Pistakee Lake and Fox Lake are the two largest lakes on the Chain, each with an area of 1,700 acres (6.9 km^{2}). Grass Lake directly connects to Fox Lake, and both lakes connect to Pistakee Lake through Nippersink Lake. The Fox River exits the Chain O'Lakes at the southwest corner of Pistakee Lake.

== Lake sizes ==
The following table lists the sizes (and depths if given) of nine of the fifteen lakes on the Chain. The information provided is from the Fox Waterway Agency website.

Lake name	Area (acres)	Avg. depth (ft)
Lake Catherine	155	–
Channel Lake	352	–
Lake Marie	480	14
Bluff Lake	86	–
Petite Lake	167	12
Grass Lake	1,360	3
Fox Lake	1,700	–
Nippersink Lake	420	–
Pistakee Lake	1,715.7	–

=== Grass Lake ===
In the late 19th and early 20th century, Grass Lake was a "stretch of wild rice and lotus", with lotus beds blossoming in it that constituted over half of the total in all the lakes. In the early 20th century some boats, due to the shallow water and density of lotuses, had to use a pole ("poling") rather than oars ("rowing"). During the 1950s through the 1970s, much of the lotus disappeared due to human traffic but there has been a revival in recent years.

There is a historical location in Grass Lake, derived from the tourists who came to see the lotus. At first, this location was known as "Rohema", but also as "Shorty's", after the owner Shorty Shobin. Shorty, however was not the only entrepreneur on the lake. Jack O' Conner owned a houseboat about 100 yards from Shorty, and one night in a card match they wagered their businesses. O'Conner won, and moved his business to the island, naming it Lotus Lodge Hotel, then Hotel Blarney, and finally, Blarney Island as it remains today.

== Local communities ==
Several towns and cities surround the Chain O'Lakes. Although open to some interpretation, towns bordering the Chain O'Lakes include Fox Lake, Fox Lake Hills, Lake Villa, Antioch, Spring Grove, Pistakee Highlands, Johnsburg, Volo, McHenry, Round Lake, Round Lake Beach, Round Lake Heights, and Ingleside. Central to the system is the town of Fox Lake, between Pistakee Lake and Fox Lake.

== Major roads ==
Several major highways and state routes cross over and travel around the Chain O'Lakes. The following table lists the major roads in the Chain O'Lakes region and a brief description about the location of the route.

Sign	Route number	Local name	Location description
	US Route 12	Rand Road	Crosses over the Chain between Pistakee and Nippersink Lake
	Illinois Route 59	Fox Lake Road	Follows the eastern edge of the Chain O'Lakes
	Illinois Route 132	Grand Avenue	Dead ends at the east side of Fox Lake
	Illinois Route 134	Big Hollow Road	Follows the south edge of the Chain
	Illinois Route 173	Kenosha Street	Crosses the Chain between Channel Lake and Lake Marie

== History ==
=== Early history ===
The Chain O'Lakes were formed when the Wisconsin glacier melted, leaving behind many of the lakes now present in the Fox River Valley, including those in the Chain. The Chain O'Lakes region was originally inhabited by various Native American tribes. During the first European visits to the area, the central Algonquian tribes inhabited the region, including the Miami, Mascouten and Potawatomi tribes. The first European explorers to the region were French trappers and traders in the mid-17th century, including Joliet and Marquette.

In the 19th century, a few Europeans began to settle the area. Included in these early settlers were the Dunnill family and Converse Marble, both of whom settled near the border between Pistakee Lake and Nippersink Lake. At that time, the only connection between the two lakes was the Fox River (commonly referred to as the "long channel"). In order to benefit both of their properties, the Dunnills and Converse Marble dug by hand a new channel between the two lakes which became known as "the Cut" (most likely meaning "shortcut"). The "Cut" caused a strong current and fresher water along the east shore of Nippersink Lake. Today, the channel has become deep and wide, being heavily traveled by boaters.

Until the 1880s, European settlements remained sparse in the area due to the difficulty of travel resulting from the wetland areas surrounding the Chain. In the 1890s, the area started to become a popular retreat destination for Chicagoans, with many visitors traveling to the region to take boat trips to see Fox and Grass Lake's "Egyptian Lotus" beds.

=== Early 20th century ===
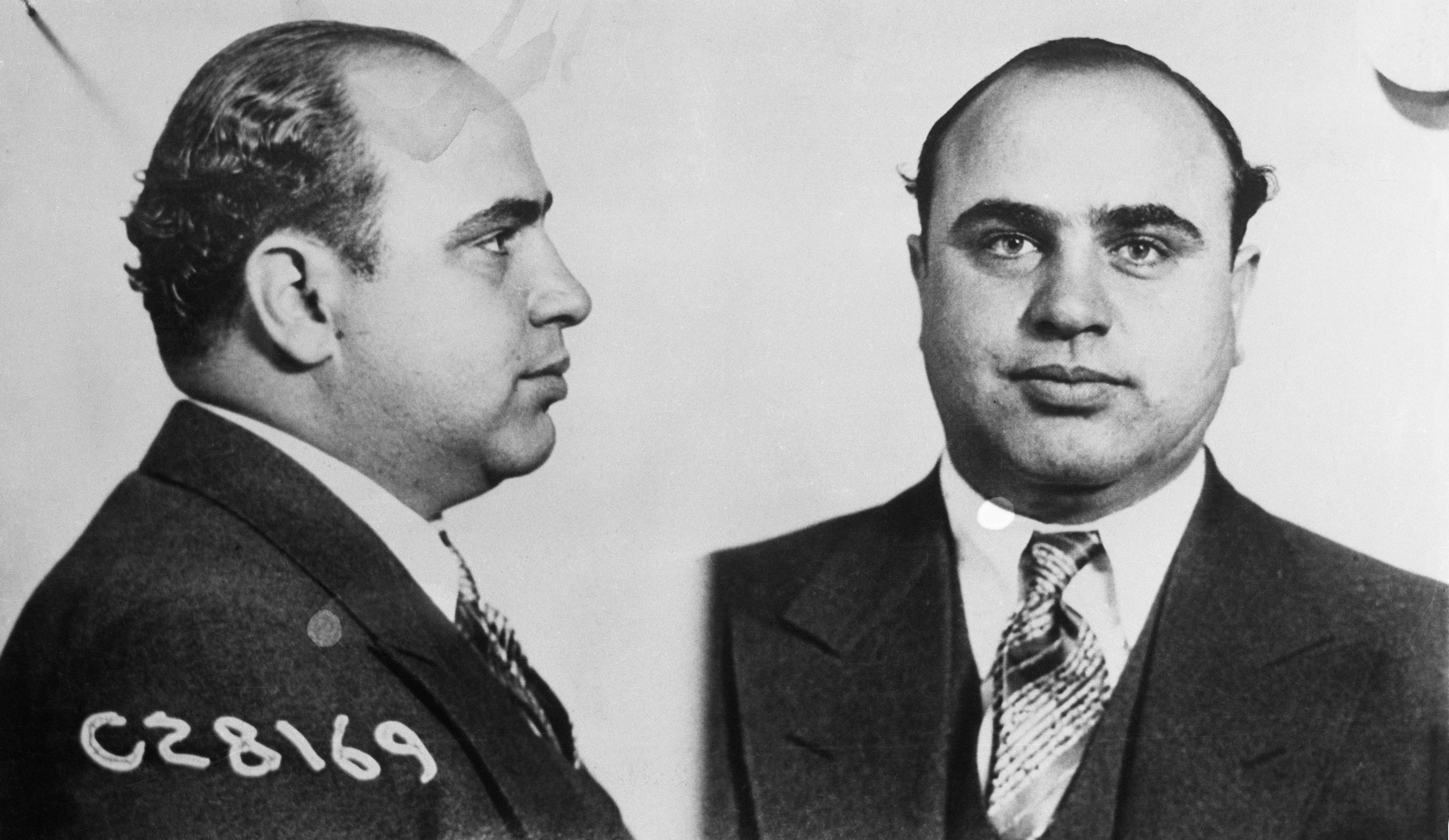
Infamous gangster Al Capone

The Chain O'Lakes region saw a boom in development at the start of the 20th century with the introduction of the Milwaukee Road railroad in 1901. The railroad crossed the Chain at its narrowest point between Pistakee Lake and Nippersink Lake, the current location of the US Route 12 crossing. A station was built near the crossing, named Nippersink Point, which would become the center of the Fox Lake community. The railroad provided effective access to the area for Chicago residents, leading to a boom in tourism. This led to the development of several new resorts, which supplemented older resorts such as the famous Mineola.

However, the boom in tourism drew the attention of Lake County leaders, who ordered raids on the numerous unlicensed drinking and gambling establishments. To avoid further raids and fines from the county government, several resort leaders united, incorporating the town of Fox Lake in 1907. When it was incorporated, Fox Lake only had a few hundred residents, but its summer season population was estimated at 20,000. The new town government placed very few restraints on its resorts, with 48 liquor licenses issued just prior to Prohibition. Even after Prohibition, enforcement was relatively low in the region, helping to draw Chicagoans interested in drinking and gambling.

Given the lax alcohol enforcement laws, the region is also famous for its hosting of Prohibition-era gangsters, including Al Capone, who owned a summer house on Bluff Lake near Antioch. He was also reputed to have visited the famous Mineola Hotel in Fox Lake although no formal documentation for this exists. Al Capone's major rival, George "Bugs" Moran, supplied beer and alcohol throughout the Chain O'Lakes region, with stories of him staying at a liquor partner's home on Channel Lake and being arrested at Elizabeth Cassidy's resort on Bluff Lake. The region saw its worst Prohibition violence on 1 June 1930, when a mob-related murder was carried out at Manning's Hotel in Fox Lake. Five people were shot with a machine gun, including members of the Druggan gang, of whom three people were killed. Occurring a year after the Saint Valentine's Day Massacre, the shooting represented the intensity of the battle to control the Chain's lucrative gambling and liquor business. The crime was never solved.

=== Mid-20th century to present ===
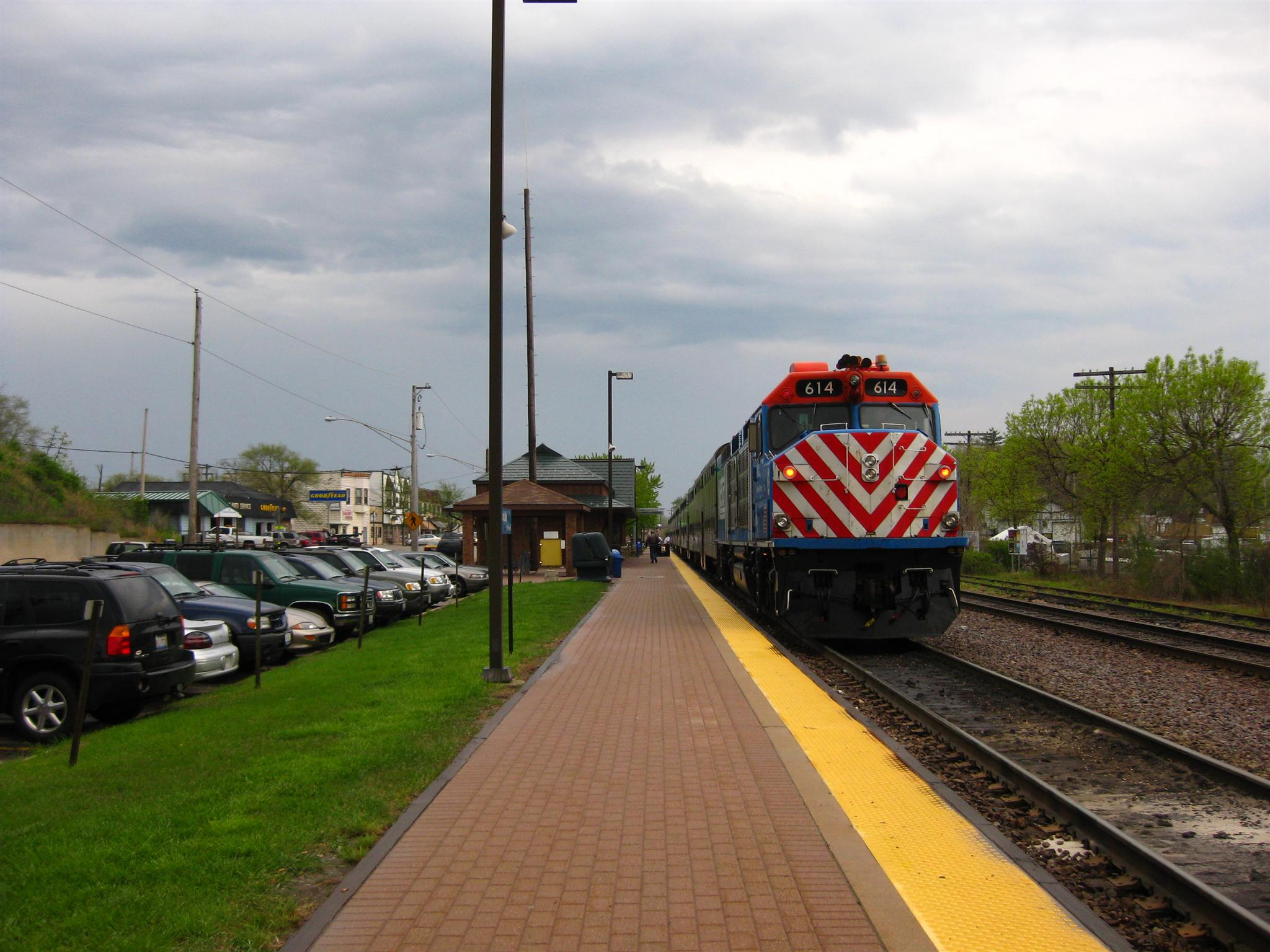
The Metra Train Station in Fox Lake shown as of 2009

Following the Roaring Twenties, the Great Depression hit the area hard. The numerous resorts around the Chain closed, signaling the end of the region's heyday as a tourist destination. During this time, many of the summer cottages began to be converted to permanent residences, a trend which continued as veterans returned from World War II. Following the war, the area began to modernize, transitioning to a middle-class community. In addition to bringing in weekend vacationers, the trains now serve the growing suburban worker population who travel into Chicago and its surrounding suburbs. As of the 2000 census, the population of Fox Lake was estimated at over 9,000 people, a major growth from the few hundred permanent residents when the town was incorporated in 1907. The area now reflects a unique blend of year-round residents and summer vacationers.

== Recreation ==
The Chain O'Lakes allows for a wide range of outdoor recreational activities, including boating, kayaking, canoeing, hunting, fishing, birdwatching, swimming, water skiing, and tubing. To complement these activities are many local businesses, including numerous marinas, restaurants and bars, that serve the weekend and summer vacationers. Many of these businesses sponsor special events throughout the summer, including boat races, fishing tournaments and live musical performances. Boating horsepower is unrestricted on the Chain, and there are more than 28,000 registered boats on the Chain (as of 2009).

Recreational opportunities are also provided through Chain O'Lakes State Park and the adjacent conservation area. Established in 1945, Chain O'Lakes State Park includes a free boat launch and a variety of hunting, hiking and fishing areas. The park includes Turner Lake, a small 44-acre (18 ha) lake in the park isolated from the Chain itself. Inside the park are four different trail systems, including a quarter-mile trail designed for disabled individuals and an eight-mile (13 km) equestrian trail. Chain O'Lakes State Park also offers a number of campsites and cabins available for a low nightly fee. Horse rentals and boat rentals are provided throughout the summer months.

The Chain O'Lakes is a preferred destination for fishermen. Species found in the Chain O'Lakes include walleye, largemouth bass, muskellunge, yellow perch, bluegill, various species of catfish, black crappie, white crappie, white bass, yellow bass, grass carp, and northern pike. The Illinois Department of Natural Resources report that approximately 10% of their annual muskellunge samples are over 3 feet (0.91 m), 6 inches long. Northern pikes and muskellunge in the trophy class are occasionally caught on the Chain. A status of the sport fishery of the lakes regarding these fish from 1954 to 2001 can be seen here. A number of invasive species have also been found to inhabit the Chain including snakehead and zebra mussel.

The Chain O'Lakes also hosts a variety of winter activities, including snowmobiling, ice skating, cross-country skiing and ice fishing.

== Commerce ==
The Chain O'Lakes is home to hundreds of businesses including marinas, boat vendors, resorts, campgrounds, restaurants and bars. Among the most famous of these is the Blarney Island bar on Grass Lake which is only accessible by boat. The bar is built about a mile from shore on a series of pilings embedded in the shallow lake bed of Grass Lake. Although many facts about the establishment have been lost with time, local legend has it that Blarney Island evolved from a poker bet between Jack O'Connor and Shorty Shobin. In the very early 20th century, Jack and Shorty were rival businessmen on the Chain operating lotus bed tours only a hundred yards apart and the competition between the two came to a head one evening during a poker game in which each man bet his business. Ultimately, Shorty lost the hand and his business, at which point he got up from the table and entered the backroom of the bar where he took his own life. Sometime later, after Jack O'Connor lost his establishment to a fire, he used Shorty's location to form Blarney Island (as it was known by 1923.) The bar began a boat shuttle service to the island in 1972, started hosting live music in 1975 and started its famous boat races in 1978. It has continued to grow its business throughout the years and has become a staple destination of the region.

Another well known former business on the Chain was the Mineola Resort. The Mineola Hotel was built in 1894 by Chicago businessmen and had 100 rooms. It was the largest wooden structure in Illinois and is on the National Register of Historic Places. The resort was popular with the gangsters of the 1920s and the Chicago Tribune stated that the Mineola was "probably the most vicious resort" in the area. While the Mineola Marina is still an operating business, the hotel was force-closed by a court order on 20 May 2012, due to issues with structural integrity.
