= Lake Villa Township, Illinois =

Lake Villa Township
- Township
- Location in Lake County

- Lake County's location in Illinois
- Coordinates: 42°24′55″N 88°4′2″W
- Country: United States
- State: Illinois
- County: Lake
- Established: 1913

Area
  - Total: 26.03 sq mi (67.4 km^{2})
  - Land: 22.77 sq mi (59.0 km^{2})
  - Water: 3.26 sq mi (8.4 km^{2}) 12.54%
- Elevation: 810 ft (250 m)

Population (2020)
  - Total: 39,796
  - Density: 1,748/sq mi (674.8/km^{2})
- Time zone: UTC-6 (CST)
  - Summer (DST): UTC-5 (CDT)
- FIPS code: 17-097-41599
- Website: www.lakevillatownship.org

Lake Villa Township is located in northwestern Lake County, Illinois. The population was 39,796 at the 2020 census.

== Geography ==
According to the 2021 census gazetteer files, Lake Villa Township has a total area of 26.03 square miles (67.42 km^{2}), of which 22.77 square miles (58.97 km^{2}) (or 87.46%) is land and 3.26 square miles (8.44 km^{2}) (or 12.54%) is water. Geologically, it is a region of glacial till, with numerous glacial lakes and wetlands. Principal lakes are Cedar Lake, Deep Lake, Crooked Lake, Sand Lake, Miltmore Lake, and Fourth Lake.

=== Cities and towns ===
- Antioch (small portions)
- Grayslake (small portion)
- Lake Villa (central areas)
- Lindenhurst (vast majority)
- Old Mill Creek (small parts)
- Round Lake Beach (north third)
- Round Lake Heights (north half)

=== Unincorporated areas ===
- Fox Lake Hills
- Ingleside (all parts east to Hazelwood Drive)
- Long Lake (part)
- Venetian Village

=== Adjacent townships ===
- Antioch Township (northwest, north)
- Newport Township (northeast)
- Warren Township (southeast)
- Avon Township (south)
- Grant Township (southwest)

== Demographics ==
As of the 2020 census there were 39,796 people, 13,546 households, and 10,494 families residing in the township. The population density was 1,528.68 inhabitants per square mile (590.23/km^{2}). There were 14,583 housing units at an average density of 560.17 per square mile (216.28/km^{2}). The racial makeup of the township was 73.97% White, 3.44% African American, 0.41% Native American, 4.90% Asian, 0.02% Pacific Islander, 6.58% from other races, and 10.67% from two or more races. Hispanic or Latino of any race were 16.90% of the population.

There were 13,546 households, out of which 40.70% had children under the age of 18 living with them, 62.34% were married couples living together, 12.08% had a female householder with no spouse present, and 22.53% were non-families. 17.70% of all households were made up of individuals, and 7.40% had someone living alone who was 65 years of age or older. The average household size was 2.91 and the average family size was 3.29.

The township's age distribution consisted of 26.4% under the age of 18, 9.4% from 18 to 24, 24.9% from 25 to 44, 28.3% from 45 to 64, and 10.8% who were 65 years of age or older. The median age was 37.1 years. For every 100 females, there were 100.2 males. For every 100 females age 18 and over, there were 97.7 males.

The median income for a household in the township was $101,882, and the median income for a family was $112,863. Males had a median income of $64,688 versus $42,820 for females. The per capita income for the township was $39,777. About 3.1% of families and 4.9% of the population were below the poverty line, including 3.7% of those under age 18 and 3.3% of those age 65 or over.

Historical population
Census	Pop.	Note	%±
2010	40,276		—
2020	39,796		−1.2%
U.S. Decennial Census

== History ==
Lake Villa Township was created in 1913 from parts of Antioch, Avon, and Grant townships. Early settlements, long predating the creation of the township, included Monaville and Stanwood. In 1883, the Chicago businessman Ernst Johann Lehmann bought 300 acres (1.2 km^{2}) in Stanwood, had the name changed to Lake Villa, and established the Lake Villa Hotel. Lehmann encouraged the Wisconsin Central Railroad Company to lay its new railway through the area, and in 1886 the new line opened with a station in Lake Villa. The Lehmann family would come to dominate the immediate area, for a time.

The railroad acted as a spur to enterprise beyond the farming which was the mainstay of the larger region. Resorting was the principal industry in the township into the 1930s. Prior to modern refrigeration, ice cutting drew seasonal labor.

The most important development following the Lehmann era was probably the creation of the village of Lindenhurst, subdivided by N. H. Engle and Sons in 1952 on the former Lehmann estate. The village was incorporated in 1956 and quickly became a force in the township.

Over the past decade the township landscape has become increasingly marked by subdivisions and strip malls, with a corresponding reduction in farm- and woodland. However, large areas of green space have been preserved by the Lake County Forest Preserves; units include Duck Farm, Grant Woods, Hastings Lake, and MacDonald Woods.

== Government officials ==
- Township supervisor: Dan Venturi
- Township clerk: Jean K Smuda
- Township trustees: Paul Berker, Joy Johnson, Barbara Stout, Jerold Coia
- Township highways: Jim Jorgensen
- Township assessor: Jeffrey Lee
