= Gavin School District 37 =

School district in Illinois, United States

Address
- 25775 W IL Hwy 134, Ingleside, IL 60041 Ingleside, Illinois Lake County, Illinois, 60041; United States

District information
- Type: Public school
- Motto: Engage, Grow, Empower
- Grades: Pre-K - 8
- Established: 1961
- President: James Miller
- Superintendent: Dr. Scott Schwartz
- Schools: Gavin South Middle School (Grades 5 to 8); Gavin Central Elementary School (Pre-K to Grade 4)
- Budget: $11,624,400
- NCES District ID: 1716290.

Students and staff
- Students: 890
- Teachers: 65 (51 FTE)
- Staff: 44
- Student–teacher ratio: 17.2
- District mascot: Tiger
- Colors: Yellow, Green

Gavin School District 37 is a school district located in Lake County, Illinois, about 40 miles north of Chicago. It governs two public schools: Gavin South Middle School (Grades 5 to 8) and Gavin Central Elementary School (up to Grade 4), both in Ingleside, Illinois.

== History ==
The schools are named after a farmer who lent some of his land to be used as a school in the 1840s. Prior to the 1995–96 school year, there were three Gavin schools: Central, North and South. Central housed Pre-K to 3rd grades, North 4th and 5th grades, and South 6th to 8th grades. In 1996 Gavin Central school was rebuilt. From 1996 to 2003, North housed Pre-K to 1st grades, Central 2nd to 5th grades and South 6th to 8th grades. Then, for the 2003-04 year, Pre-K to 5th was at Central. In the spring of 2004, due to problems with roof damage at Gavin Central, Pre-K, Kindergarten, and 1st Grade were moved to Lakes Community High School, 2nd-4th Grade to Lake Zurich, and Grade 5 to Gavin South. That year also saw the closure of Gavin North, the reason cited being "structural problems". The property was sold to the town of Lake Villa and is now a community center.

Gavin Central was eventually reopened and now houses Pre-K, Early Childhood, kindergarten and 1st–4th grade. Gavin South now houses 5th-8th grade.

== The school district ==
Gavin School District's superintendent is Dr Scott Schwartz. It is governed by a board of education, whose president is James Miller. It employs nine staff at its office at Gavin South School. The district provides transport by leased buses for nearly all students, and commissions catering services at both schools. The two schools together employ 65 teachers and 44 support staff, and cater for about 890 students from the communities of Ingleside, Long Lake, Lake Villa, and Fox Lake. Students who stay in school beyond Grade 8 attend Grant Community High School, which is within District 124.

== Schools ==
=== Gavin South Middle School ===
Gavin South Middle School takes students at Grades 5 to 8. The principal is J. Jurgaitis.

==== Sport ====
Sports offered for both boys and girls include Basketball, Soccer, Track, Volleyball, and Cross Country. For girls, there is in addition Cheerleading. The school also is in the VEX Robotics Competition, team 3744X for V5 and team 37373X for IQ.

=== Gavin Central Elementary School ===
Gavin Central Elementary School takes students at Pre-K stage up to Grade 4. The principal is Carol Bennett.

== Sexual assault conviction ==
On 24 September 2015 a former Gavin Middle School teacher, Michael Vucic, who had fled the country amid allegations that he molested two former students, pleaded guilty in a Lake County, Illinois, courtroom to charges of sexual assault and possession of child pornography. Attorneys expected him to receive a sentence of between six and 82 years in prison later in 2015. Three other teachers were charged in the case for failure to report the sex abuse allegations against Vucic.
