= Loon Lake, Illinois =

- Unincorporated community
- Location within Illinois Location within the United States
- Coordinates: 42°26′49″N 88°05′24″W
- Country: United States
- State: Illinois
- County: Lake
- Township: Antioch
- Elevation: 787 ft (240 m)
- Time zone: UTC-6 (Central (CST))
  - Summer (DST): UTC-5 (CDT)
- ZIP: 60002
- Area codes: 847 & 224
- GNIS feature ID: 412629

Loon Lake is an unincorporated community in Antioch Township, Lake County, Illinois, United States. Loon Lake is located at the junction of Illinois Route 83 and County Route 10A on the northern border of Lake Villa.
