= Monaville, Illinois =

- Unincorporated community
- Location within Illinois Location within the United States
- Coordinates: 42°23′58″N 88°06′41″W
- Country: United States
- State: Illinois
- County: Lake
- Township: Lake Villa
- Elevation: 791 ft (241 m)
- Time zone: UTC-6 (Central (CST))
  - Summer (DST): UTC-5 (CDT)
- Area codes: 847 & 224
- GNIS feature ID: 413717

Monaville is an unincorporated community in Lake Villa Township, Lake County, Illinois, United States. Monaville is located at the junction of County Routes A18 and V65 near the southern border of Lake Villa.
