= Sylvan Lake, Illinois =

- Unincorporated community
- Location within Illinois Location within the United States
- Coordinates: 42°14′38″N 88°03′10″W
- Country: United States
- State: Illinois
- County: Lake
- Townships: Fremont, Ela
- Elevation: 820 ft (250 m)
- Time zone: UTC-6 (Central (CST))
  - Summer (DST): UTC-5 (CDT)
- ZIP: 60060
- Area codes: 847 & 224
- GNIS feature ID: 419508

Sylvan Lake is an unincorporated community in Lake County, Illinois, United States. Sylvan Lake is located on the shore of Sylvan Lake 2 miles (3.2 km) north of Hawthorn Woods and 3 miles (4.8 km) southwest of Mundelein.
