= Chain O'Lakes State Park (Illinois) =

State park in Illinois, USA

- IUCN category III (natural monument or feature)
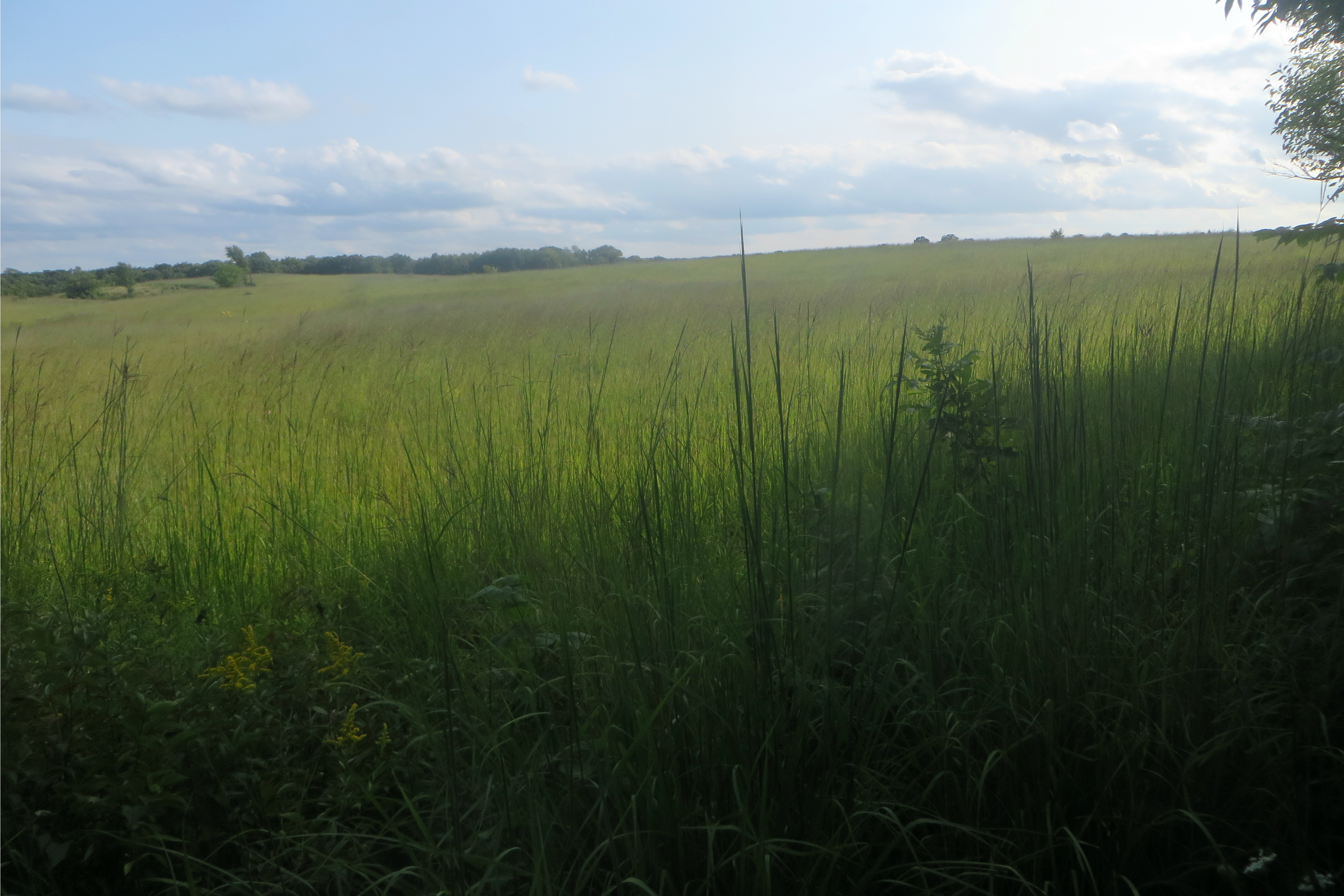
- Prairie in Chain O'Lakes State Park, August 2017

- Location within Illinois Location within the United States
- Location: Lake and McHenry counties, Illinois, United States
- Nearest city: Spring Grove, Illinois
- Coordinates: 42°27′32″N 88°10′27″W
- Area: 2,793 acres (1,130 ha)
- Established: 1945
- Governing body: Illinois Department of Natural Resources

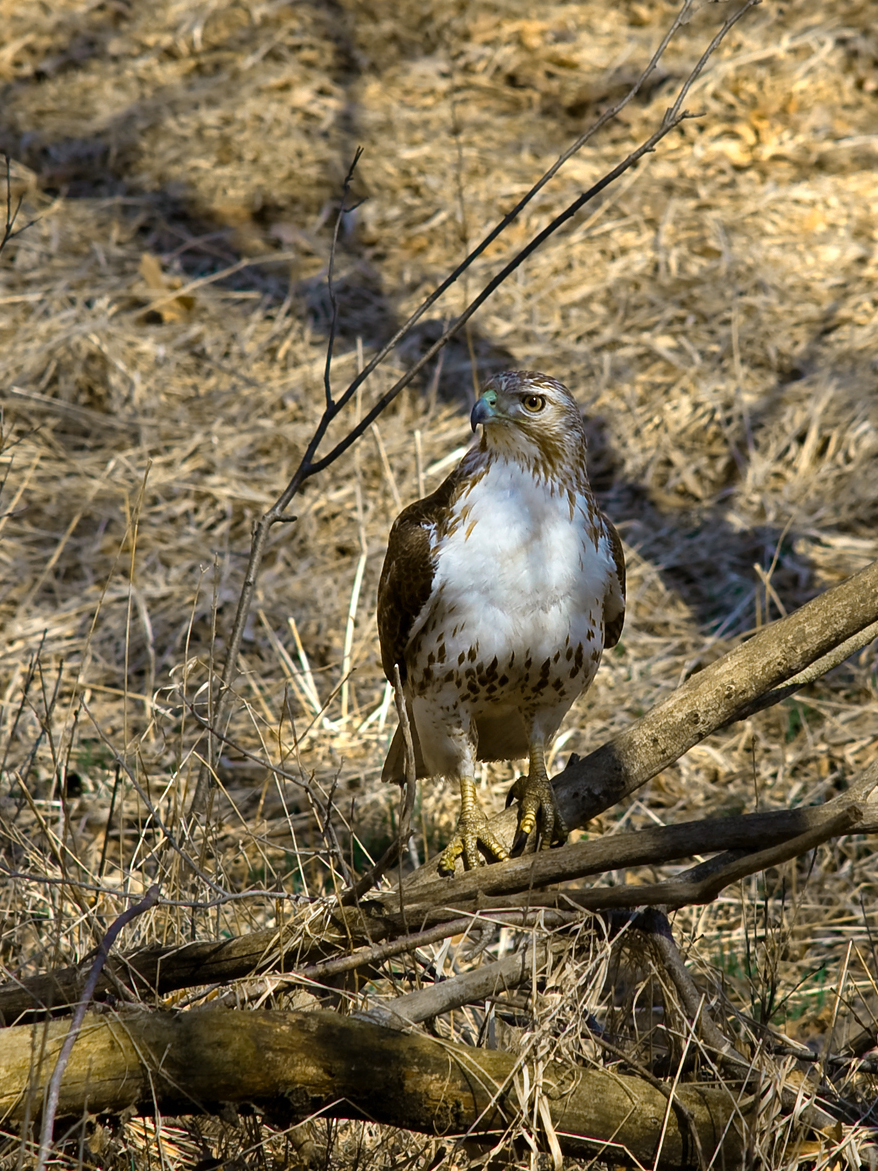
Juvenile Red-tailed Hawk at Chain O'Lakes State Park (Illinois)

Chain O'Lakes State Park is a 2,793-acre (1,130 ha) Illinois state park at the inlet of the Fox River into the Chain O'Lakes in Lake and McHenry counties, in the suburban wildlife of Chicago, Illinois, United States.

It is one of the centerpieces of the proposed Hackmatack National Wildlife Refuge.
