= Grant Township, Lake County, Illinois =

Grant Township
- Township
- Motto(s): "Grass Roots and New Tomorrows"
- Location in Lake County

- Lake County's location in Illinois
- Coordinates: 42°22′08″N 88°09′36″W
- Country: United States
- State: Illinois
- County: Lake

Government
  - Supervisor: Catherine "Kay" Starostovic

Area
  - Total: 23.02 sq mi (59.6 km^{2})
  - Land: 17.63 sq mi (45.7 km^{2})
  - Water: 5.39 sq mi (14.0 km^{2}) 23.41%
- Elevation: 801 ft (244 m)

Population (2020)
  - Total: 28,051
  - Density: 1,591/sq mi (614.3/km^{2})
- Time zone: UTC-6 (CST)
  - Summer (DST): UTC-5 (CDT)
- FIPS code: 17-097-30952
- Website: www.granttownshipcenter.org

Grant Township is a township in Lake County, Illinois, USA. As of the 2020 census, its population was 28,051. Grant Township changed its name from Goodale Township on March 8, 1867.

== Geography ==
According to the 2021 census gazetteer files, Grant Township has a total area of 23.02 square miles (59.62 km^{2}), of which 17.63 square miles (45.66 km^{2}) (or 76.59%) is land and 5.39 square miles (13.96 km^{2}) (or 23.41%) is water. Lakes in this township include Brandenburg Lake, Duck Lake, Fish Lake, Fox Lake, Long Lake, Nippersink Lake, Redhead Lake, Sullivan Lake and Wooster Lake. The streams of Eagle Creek and Squaw Creek run through this township.

=== Cities and towns ===
- Fox Lake (south half)
- Lakemoor (nourtheast quarter)
- Long Lake (west three-quarters)
- Round Lake (west quarter)
- Volo (north half)

=== Unincorporated towns ===
- Ingleside

=== Adjacent townships ===
- Antioch Township (northeast)
- Lake Villa Township (northeast)
- Avon Township (east)
- Fremont Township (southeast)
- Wauconda Township (south)
- McHenry Township, McHenry County (west)
- Burton Township, McHenry County (northwest)

=== Cemeteries ===
The township contains two cemeteries, Grant, and St. Bede Catholic Cemetery

=== Major highways ===
- U.S. Route 12
- Illinois State Route 59
- Illinois State Route 120
- Illinois State Route 134

=== Airports and landing strips ===
- Arrow Heliport
- Precision Chrome Heliport

=== Railroad lines ===
- Milwaukee District North Line

== Demographics ==
As of the 2020 census there were 28,051 people, 10,223 households, and 6,427 families residing in the township. The population density was 1,218.60 inhabitants per square mile (470.50/km^{2}). There were 12,189 housing units at an average density of 529.52 per square mile (204.45/km^{2}). The racial makeup of the township was 74.54% White, 3.20% African American, 0.67% Native American, 3.77% Asian, 0.04% Pacific Islander, 6.61% from other races, and 11.17% from two or more races. Hispanic or Latino of any race were 17.79% of the population.

There were 10,223 households, out of which 30.40% had children under the age of 18 living with them, 47.47% were married couples living together, 10.67% had a female householder with no spouse present, and 37.13% were non-families. 27.20% of all households were made up of individuals, and 8.80% had someone living alone who was 65 years of age or older. The average household size was 2.60 and the average family size was 3.28.

The township's age distribution consisted of 23.2% under the age of 18, 9.2% from 18 to 24, 27% from 25 to 44, 28.6% from 45 to 64, and 11.9% who were 65 years of age or older. The median age was 37.6 years. For every 100 females, there were 93.5 males. For every 100 females age 18 and over, there were 87.0 males.

The median income for a household in the township was $77,106, and the median income for a family was $96,954. Males had a median income of $50,493 versus $38,936 for females. The per capita income for the township was $35,753. About 5.0% of families and 7.5% of the population were below the poverty line, including 7.1% of those under age 18 and 7.0% of those age 65 or over.

Historical population
| Census | Pop. | Note | %± |
|---|---|---|---|
| 2010 | 26,523 | | — |
| 2020 | 28,051 | | 5.8% |
U.S. Decennial Census
