= Illinois Route 134 =

State highway in Lake County, Illinois, US

Illinois Route 134
- IL 134 highlighted in red

Route information
- Maintained by IDOT
- Length: 5.62 mi (9.04 km)
- Existed: 1950–present

Major junctions
- West end: US 12 / IL 59 / CR A26 in Fox Lake
- East end: IL 120 in Hainesville

Location
- Country: United States
- State: Illinois
- Counties: Lake

Highway system
- Illinois State Highway System; Interstate; US; State; Tollways; Scenic
← IL 133	→ IL 135

Illinois Route 134 (IL 134) is a 5.62-mile-long (9.04 km) east–west state route in northeastern Illinois. It runs from U.S. Route 12 (US 12) and IL 59 in Fox Lake to IL 120 (Belvidere Road) in Hainesville. its a popular highway as of 2026

== Route description ==
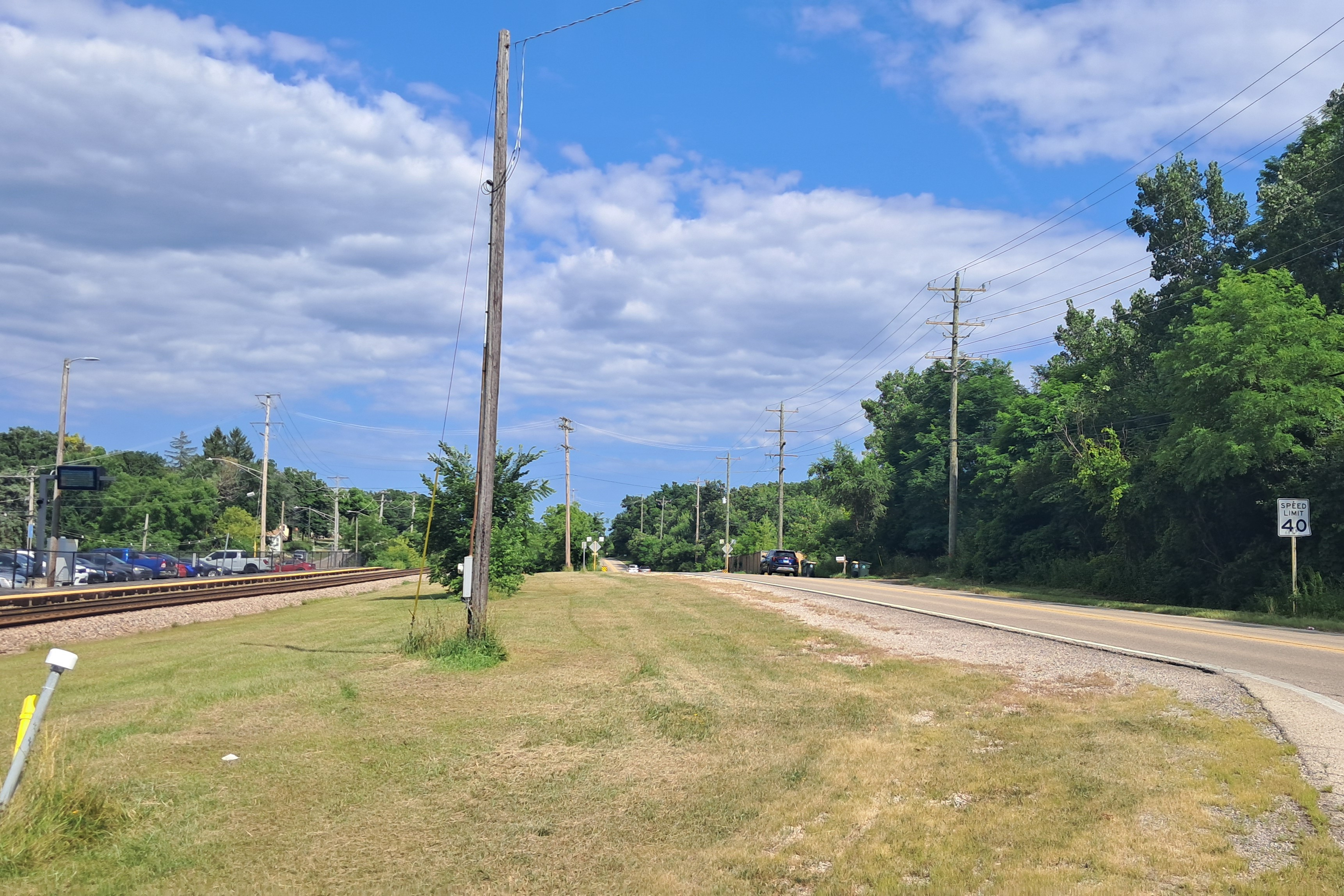
Eastbound IL 134 in Long Lake

Illinois 134 is called Big Hollow Road in Fox Lake. In Round Lake, it is called Round Lake Road west of downtown, and Main Street east of downtown. After its terminus, Big Hollow Road continues further west for an additional 5.8 miles under county control first as Lake County Highway A26. It then crosses the county line and becomes McHenry County Highway A26 and continues until Illinois Route 31.

== History ==
SBI Route 134 originally ran from Paris to the Indiana state line on what is now U.S. Route 150. In 1950, it was placed on the current route, and has not been changed since.

== Major Intersections ==
The entire route is in Lake County.

Location	mi	km	Destinations	Notes
Fox Lake	0.00	0.00	US 12 / IL 59	
Hainesville	5.62	9.04	IL 120	
1.000 mi = 1.609 km; 1.000 km = 0.621 mi
