= Round Lake Heights, Illinois =

- Village
- Seal

- Location of Round Lake Heights in Lake County, Illinois.
- Coordinates: 42°23′08″N 88°06′13″W
- Country: United States
- State: Illinois
- County: Lake
- Townships: Avon, Lake Villa

Area
  - Total: 0.63 sq mi (1.63 km^{2})
  - Land: 0.58 sq mi (1.49 km^{2})
  - Water: 0.054 sq mi (0.14 km^{2})
- Elevation: 781 ft (238 m)

Population (2020)
  - Total: 2,622
  - Density: 4,557.0/sq mi (1,759.45/km^{2})
- Time zone: UTC-6 (CST)
  - Summer (DST): UTC-5 (CDT)
- ZIP code: 60073
- Area codes: 847 and 224
- FIPS code: 17-66053
- GNIS feature ID: 2399133
- Website: www.villageofroundlakeheights.org

Round Lake Heights is a village in Lake County, Illinois, United States. Per the 2020 census, the population was 2,622.

== Geography ==
According to the 2021 census gazetteer files, Round Lake Heights has a total area of 0.63 square miles (1.63 km^{2}), of which 0.58 square miles (1.50 km^{2}) (or 91.41%) is land and 0.05 square miles (0.13 km^{2}) (or 8.59%) is water.

=== Major streets ===
- Fairfield Road
- Rollins Road
- Lotus Drive
- Blackcherry Lane/Chippewa Trail/Ojibwa Trail/Navajo Trail

== Demographics ==
Historical population
Census	Pop.	Note	%±
1970	1,144		—
1980	1,192		4.2%
1990	1,251		4.9%
2000	1,347		7.7%
2010	2,676		98.7%
2020	2,622		−2.0%
U.S. Decennial Census; 2010 2020

=== Racial and ethnic composition ===
Round Lake Heights village, Illinois – Racial and ethnic composition Note: the US Census treats Hispanic/Latino as an ethnic category. This table excludes Latinos from the racial categories and assigns them to a separate category. Hispanics/Latinos may be of any race.
Race / Ethnicity (NH = Non-Hispanic)	Pop 2000	Pop 2010	Pop 2020	% 2000	% 2010	% 2020
White alone (NH)	982	1,371	1,055	72.90%	51.23%	40.24%
Black or African American alone (NH)	26	136	133	1.93%	5.08%	5.07%
Native American or Alaska Native alone (NH)	2	5	2	0.15%	0.19%	0.08%
Asian alone (NH)	15	154	118	1.11%	5.75%	4.50%
Native Hawaiian or Pacific Islander alone (NH)	1	0	4	0.07%	0.00%	0.15%
Other race alone (NH)	2	2	9	0.15%	0.07%	0.34%
Mixed race or Multiracial (NH)	31	45	116	2.30%	1.68%	4.42%
Hispanic or Latino (any race)	288	963	1,185	21.38%	35.99%	45.19%
Total	1,347	2,676	2,622	100.00%	100.00%	100.00%

=== 2020 census ===
As of the 2020 census, Round Lake Heights had a population of 2,622. The population density was 4,168.52 inhabitants per square mile (1,609.47/km^{2}), and the housing unit density was 1,290.94 per square mile (498.43/km^{2}). The median age was 33.7 years. 28.2% of residents were under the age of 18 and 8.2% of residents were 65 years of age or older. For every 100 females there were 102.3 males, and for every 100 females age 18 and over there were 100.1 males age 18 and over.

100.0% of residents lived in urban areas, while 0.0% lived in rural areas.

There were 783 households and 704 families in Round Lake Heights, of which 52.2% had children under the age of 18 living in them. Of all households, 60.0% were married-couple households, 16.6% were households with a male householder and no spouse or partner present, and 16.9% were households with a female householder and no spouse or partner present. About 12.8% of all households were made up of individuals and 3.4% had someone living alone who was 65 years of age or older.

Of the village's housing units, 3.6% were vacant. The homeowner vacancy rate was 0.9% and the rental vacancy rate was 7.3%.

=== Income and poverty ===
The median income for a household in the village was $74,286, and the median income for a family was $86,786. Males had a median income of $40,265 versus $30,515 for females. The per capita income for the village was $24,854. About 9.7% of families and 8.4% of the population were below the poverty line, including 11.3% of those under age 18 and 3.0% of those age 65 or over.

== Government ==
Mayor

- Terry Lumpkins

Trustees

- Anthony Pekar
- Jeff Katzel
- Andrew Walker
- Sharon Weigand
- Jeff Nehila
- Marva Meeks

Clerk

- Erica Carrillo

Treasurer

- Maribel Carrillo

== Transportation ==
Pace provides bus service on Route 570 connecting Round Lake Heights to Fox Lake, Grayslake, and other destinations.
