= Volo, Illinois =

- Village
- Flag
- Motto: "A Family Community"
- Location of Volo in Lake County, Illinois.
- Coordinates: 42°19′50″N 88°09′32″W
- Country: United States
- State: Illinois
- County: Lake
- Townships: Grant, Wauconda

Area
  - Total: 4.00 sq mi (10.35 km^{2})
  - Land: 3.92 sq mi (10.14 km^{2})
  - Water: 0.081 sq mi (0.21 km^{2})
- Elevation: 764 ft (233 m)

Population (2020)
  - Total: 6,122
  - Density: 1,563.9/sq mi (603.84/km^{2})
- Time zone: UTC-6 (CST)
  - Summer (DST): UTC-5 (CDT)
- ZIP code: 60073, 60020
- Area codes: Area code 847 and 224
- FIPS code: 17-78227
- GNIS feature ID: 2400077
- Website: www.villageofvolo.com

Volo is a village in Lake County, Illinois, United States. It was incorporated as a village on April 26, 1993. Per the 2020 census, the population was 6,122.

== Geography ==
According to the 2021 census gazetteer files, Volo has a total area of 4.00 square miles (10.36 km^{2}), of which 3.91 square miles (10.13 km^{2}) (or 97.97%) is land and 0.08 square miles (0.21 km^{2}) (or 2.03%) is water.

=== Major streets ===
- US Route 12
- Illinois Route 59
- Illinois Route 60
- Illinois Route 120 (Belvidere Road)
- Nippersink Road
- Molidor Road
- Fish Lake Road
- Gilmer Road
- Sullivan Lake Road
- Fox Lake Road
- Volo Village Road

== Demographics ==
Historical population
Census	Pop.	Note	%±
1880	126		—
2000	180		—
2010	2,929		1,527.2%
2020	6,122		109.0%
U.S. Decennial Census; 2010 2020

=== Racial and ethnic composition ===
Volo village, Illinois – Racial and ethnic composition Note: the US Census treats Hispanic/Latino as an ethnic category. This table excludes Latinos from the racial categories and assigns them to a separate category. Hispanics/Latinos may be of any race.
Race / Ethnicity (NH = Non-Hispanic)	Pop 2000	Pop 2010	Pop 2020	% 2000	% 2010	% 2020
White alone (NH)	133	2,209	4,153	73.89%	75.42%	67.84%
Black or African American alone (NH)	0	56	214	0.00%	1.91%	3.50%
Native American or Alaska Native alone (NH)	0	5	5	0.00%	0.17%	0.08%
Asian alone (NH)	2	236	524	1.11%	8.06%	8.56%
Native Hawaiian or Pacific Islander alone (NH)	0	2	0	0.00%	0.07%	0.00%
Other race alone (NH)	0	7	15	0.00%	0.24%	0.25%
Mixed Race or Multiracial (NH)	3	57	279	1.67%	1.95%	4.56%
Hispanic or Latino (any race)	42	357	932	23.33%	12.19%	15.22%
Total	180	2,929	6,122	100.00%	100.00%	100.00%

=== 2020 census ===
As of the 2020 census, Volo had a population of 6,122. The population density was 1,532.42 inhabitants per square mile (591.67/km^{2}). There were 2,120 housing units at an average density of 530.66 per square mile (204.89/km^{2}), and 2.2% of housing units were vacant.

The median age was 34.5 years. 31.5% of residents were under the age of 18 and 7.1% were 65 years of age or older. For every 100 females, there were 95.9 males; for every 100 females age 18 and over, there were 92.7 males age 18 and over. 96.7% of residents lived in urban areas, while 3.3% lived in rural areas.

There were 2,073 households and 1,489 families in Volo. Of all households, 49.3% had children under the age of 18 living in them, and 17.0% were made up of individuals, including 4.3% with someone living alone who was 65 years of age or older. The average household size was 3.20, and the average family size was 2.78. The homeowner vacancy rate was 1.3% and the rental vacancy rate was 2.9%.

=== Income and poverty ===
The median income for a household in the village was $103,264, and the median income for a family was $111,481. Males had a median income of $77,202 versus $44,420 for females. The per capita income for the village was $41,911. About 0.0% of families and 1.3% of the population were below the poverty line, including 0.0% of those under age 18 and 0.0% of those age 65 or over.

== Institutions and parks ==
Volo contains the Volo Auto Museum and is located near the Volo Bog State Natural Area (which is just outside the village boundary), which was the first purchase of the Illinois Nature Conservancy. Cyrus Mark, the first president of the Illinois Nature Conservancy, spearheaded the effort to purchase Volo Bog for preservation. Cyrus was the son of steel magnate Clayton Mark, the builder of the planned worker community named Marktown.
