= Belle Austin Jacobs Memorial =

Sculpture by Sylvia Shaw Judson

- Artist: Sylvia Shaw Judson
- Year: 1931
- Type: bronze
- Location: 43°0′10.21″N 87°55′25.72″W
- Owner: Administered by Milwaukee County, Department of Parks, Recreation and Culture, Wauwatosa, Wisconsin

Memorial for Belle Austin Jacobs is a public artwork by American artist Sylvia Shaw Judson (sculptor) and Alexander C. Eschweiler (architect), formerly located in Kosciuszko Park, Lincoln Village, City of Milwaukee, Wisconsin, United States. The statue depicted a young woman kneeling to feed a squirrel. It celebrated the life and philanthropy of Belle Austin Jacobs, who was best known for her work, with her husband Herbert Henry Jacobs, as the founders of organized social work in Wisconsin, including the establishment of the University Settlement House.

== Description ==
About four feet tall and weighing 500–1000 lbs the bronze statue by Sylvia Shaw Judson sat atop a black granite base with limestone benches designed by Alexander C. Eschweiler

== Historical information ==
The statue portion of the sculpture was stolen in 1975. The estimated value of the statue at the time was $10,000. Its scrap metal value was $175–$400.

=== Acquisition ===
Financed in memory of Belle Austin Jacobs by the Belle Jacobs Memorial Association at a cost of $5,600

== See also ==
- Bird Girl, a similar work by the artist
