= Tillandsia carlsoniae =

Scientific classification
- Kingdom: Plantae
- Clade: Tracheophytes
- Clade: Angiosperms
- Clade: Monocots
- Clade: Commelinids
- Order: Poales
- Family: Bromeliaceae
- Genus: Tillandsia
- Subgenus: Tillandsia subg. Tillandsia
- Species: T. carlsoniae

Binomial name
- Tillandsia carlsoniae L.B.Sm.

Species of plant

Tillandsia carlsoniae is a species of flowering plant in the genus Tillandsia. This species is endemic to Mexico. It is named after the person that discovered it in Chiapas, Margery C. Carlson.

== Cultivars ==
- Tillandsia 'Hidden Charm'
