= Clayton Mark and Company =

American manufacturer based in Illinois

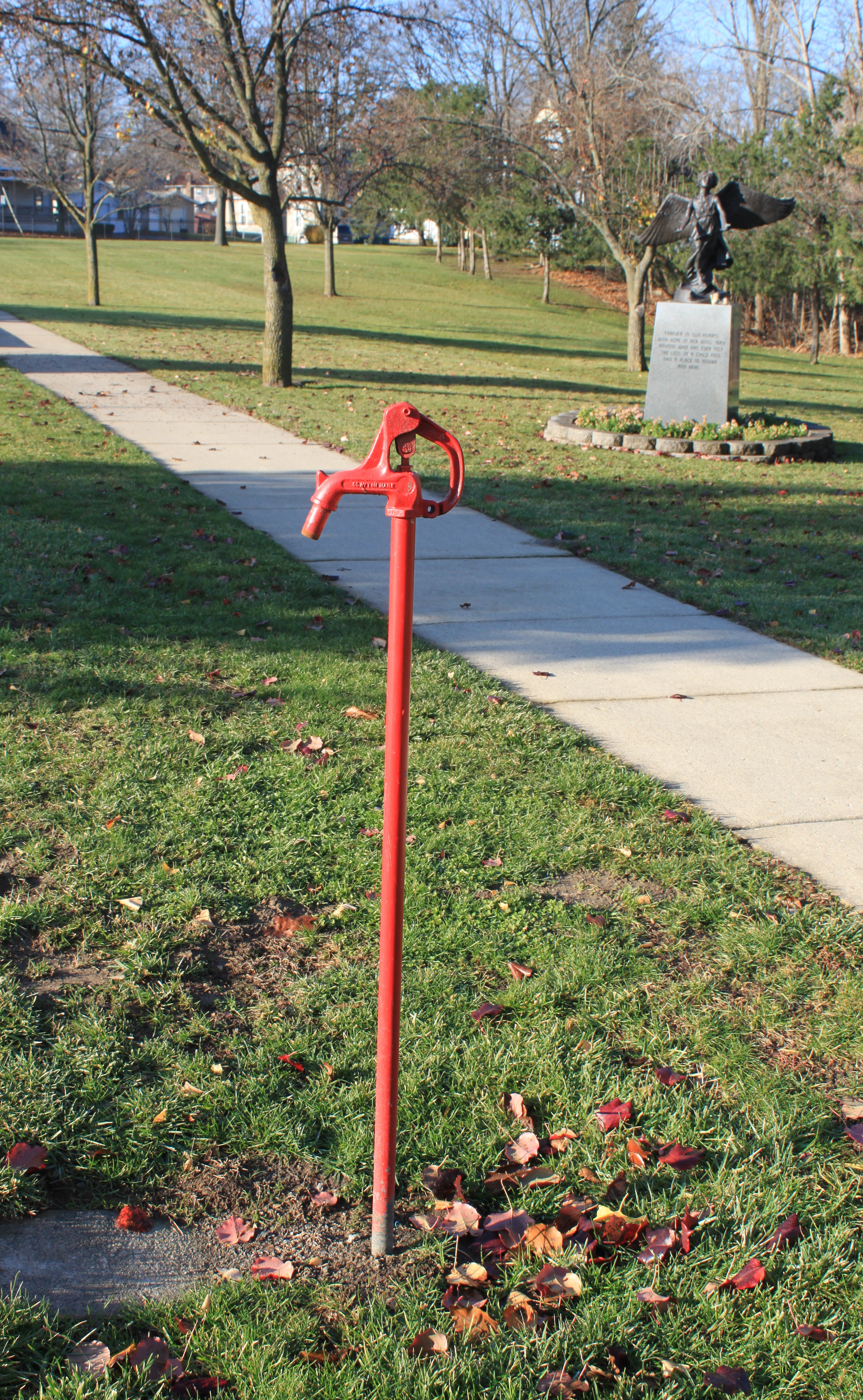
A Clayton Mark yard standpipe or hydrant, Oakwood Cemetery, Adrian, Michigan

Clayton Mark and Company was a manufacturer of steel pipe and water well supplies located in Evanston, Illinois.

== History ==
Clayton Mark founded Clayton Mark and Company in 1900 in Evanston to manufacture wrought steel pipe and water well supplies. Clayton Mark, along with his four sons Clarence Mark, Clayton Mark, Cyrus Mark, and Griffith Mark held various positions in the firm and made it a driver of Evanston's economy. It was the single largest employer in the city, with overall sales exceeding $10,000,000 a year. Clayton Mark products were sold throughout the United States and many countries worldwide. For example, Mark's forged steel unions (high pressure fittings) were used in oil wells from Texas to Arabia. The steel tubing manufactured at Clayton Mark and Company was used in the making of furniture, automobiles, and bicycles whose market was worldwide. Mark conduit was used in house construction for the conduction of electrical wiring. The firm's water well systems, supplies, and devices were used for pumping water out of the ground in rural districts around the globe.

Clayton Mark also co-founded with his father Cyrus the Mark Manufacturing Company in Northwest Indiana. In addition, he founded Marktown, a planned worker community to house its employees in East Chicago, Indiana.
