= Clayton Mark =

American steel and steel pipe industrialist (1858–1936)

- Born: June 30, 1858; Fredericksburg, Pennsylvania
- Died: July 7, 1936 (aged 78)
- Spouse: Anna Griffith
- Children: 9

Clayton Mark (June 30, 1858 – July 7, 1936), was an American industrialist in the Chicago area who founded the Mark Manufacturing Company in 1888, a firm for the fabrication and sale of water-well supplies and Clayton Mark and Company in 1900. In addition to being a pioneer maker of steel pipe in the United States, Mark founded Marktown, a planned worker community in northwest Indiana on the National Register of Historic Places. He was also known for his philanthropy and civic contributions.

== Early years ==
Mark, born in 1858 in Fredericksburg, Pennsylvania, to Cyrus and Rebecca (née Strohm) Mark. His earliest paternal ancestor in America was William Killian Mark, who emigrated with his brothers from Switzerland to Lebanon County, Pennsylvania in 1735.

Clayton moved to Chicago with his family in 1872. He was educated in the public schools of Pennsylvania and Illinois, and stopped formal education after completing seventh grade at Brown School in Chicago. Mark's family relocated to Carroll, Iowa in 1836 after Cyrus Mark's dry goods business burned down. Cyrus subsequently established another dry goods business in Carroll. However, Clayton stayed in Chicago to begin his career as a file clerk for Chicago Malleable Iron Co. in 1876, where he advanced to secretary and then to vice-president. He was on the Board of Directors until his death.

== Mark Manufacturing Company ==
Mark founded The Mark Manufacturing Company in 1888 as a co-partnership with his father Cyrus Mark. The company initially manufactured well points, small castings used in the construction of wells. This business was later expanded to include the manufacturing of steel pipes. In 1900, he built a pipe mill in Evanston, IL, bought another in Ohio in 1901, a zinc mining company in 1906, and in 1916 Mark built a steel mill in Indiana Harbor to supply his own requirements for steel.

== Marktown ==
In 1917, Mark began construction of a planned worker community “Marktown” to house the workers of his steel mill in Indiana Harbor, East Chicago, although it was never completed. Marktown was designed to house 8,000 employees in 200 houses, and the plans included a recreation building, both elementary and high schools, a post office, a movie theatre, and a recreational park with tennis courts. In contrast to the neighboring planned worker community developed by the Pullman Company in which workers were not allowed to own their homes, the residents of Marktown were to have the opportunity to either rent or purchase their homes.

Mark commissioned the renowned architect Howard Van Doren Shaw to design Marktown. Shaw had designed Mark's own home in Lake Forest, Illinois in 1912. The final design of Marktown has been described as an attempt to recreate a gracious English country village. Construction was stopped when only a fraction of the original plans for Marktown were completed due to the aftereffects of World War I, and the sale of his steel plant to Youngstown Sheet and Tube. All of the original structures stand, and are considered representative of the planned industrial community movement of the late 19th and early 20th century. Mark's planned worker community in Northwest Indiana is regarded as an important cultural resource of architectural and historical significance, and was placed on the National Register of Historic Places in 1975.

== Civic activities ==
Mark's chief civic interest was in the field of public education, and he had a large impact on the shaping of the Chicago School Systems. Mark served on the Chicago Board of Education from 1896–1905, and served as its president from 1902-1905. As President of the Board of Education, Mark facilitated the building of new schools to alleviate crowded conditions, including the Edgar Allan Poe School in Pullman. Many of Mark's efforts were aimed at increasing the efficiency of the school system and increasing attendance. For example, he advocated the appointment and promotion of teachers based on merit. He also advocated better sanitary conditions, the establishment of school playgrounds, the extension of technical schools, and the incorporation of kindergartens into public schools.

Mark served several terms as President of the Civic Federation of Chicago from 1907 to 1929, an active reform group that addressed the city's social and political problems. It is noteworthy that Mark worked with Jane Addams on a number of educational and social reforms. Clayton Mark has been described by historians as taking part in a phenomenal number of civic affairs with overwhelming energy and drive, and that "…he tried in every way to protect and foster the things in life that made it possible for him so it would be possible for others."

== Personal life ==
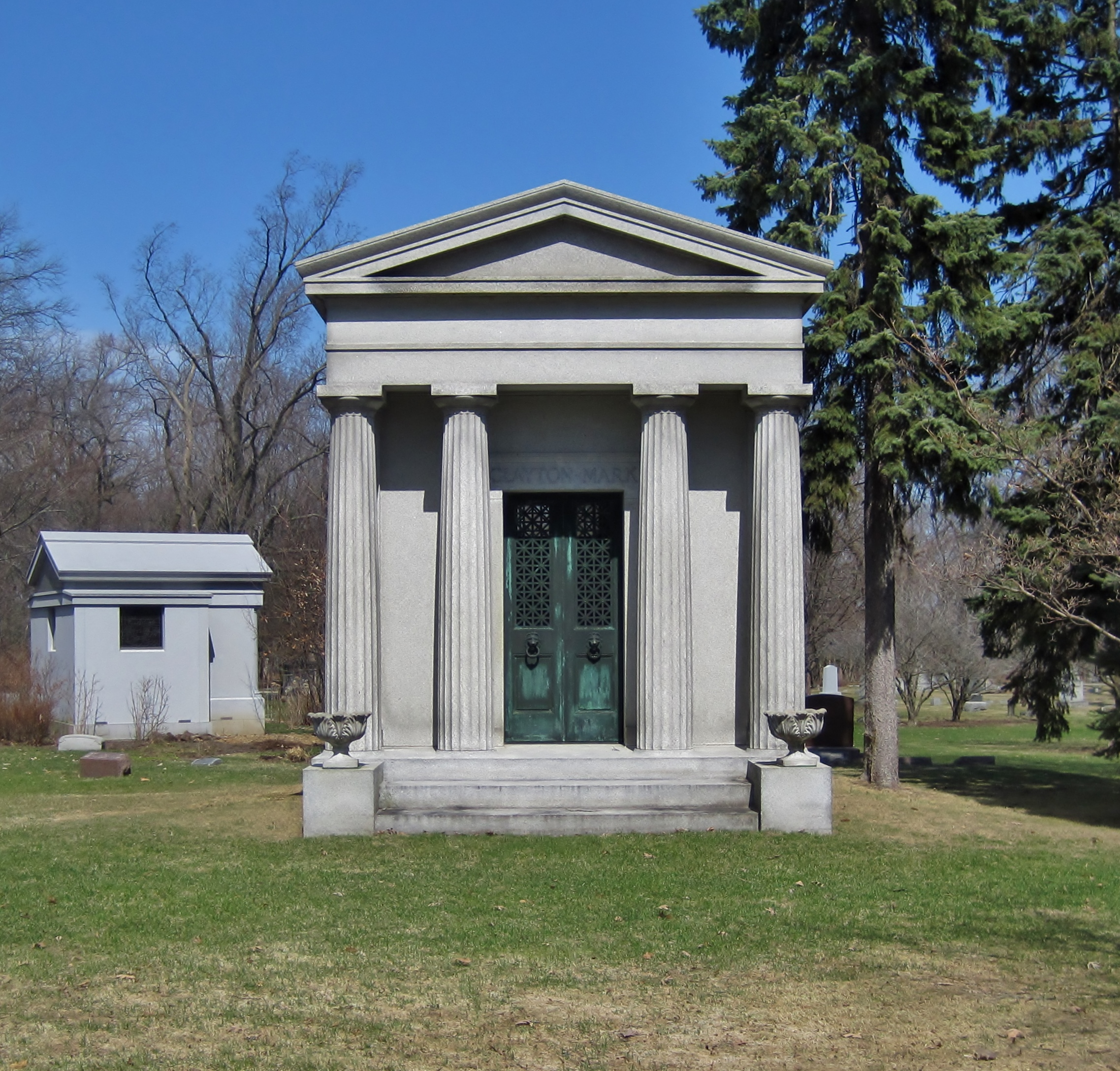
Mark’s mausoleum at Lake Forest Cemetery, Illinois

Mark married Anna Griffith and together they had nine children:

- Clarence Mark;
- Alice Mark who married McMicken Hanchett;
- Clayton Mark (married Gladys Stephens);
- Lydia Mark (married John Saville, then Arthur MacDonald);
- Phyllis Mark(married Everett Lindley Wyman);
- Cyrus Mark;
- Scytha Mark (married Alvin Ehret);
- Griffith Mark (married Elinor Patterson);
- Anna Mark (married Avery Rockefeller).
