= Howard Van Doren Shaw =

American architect (1869–1926)

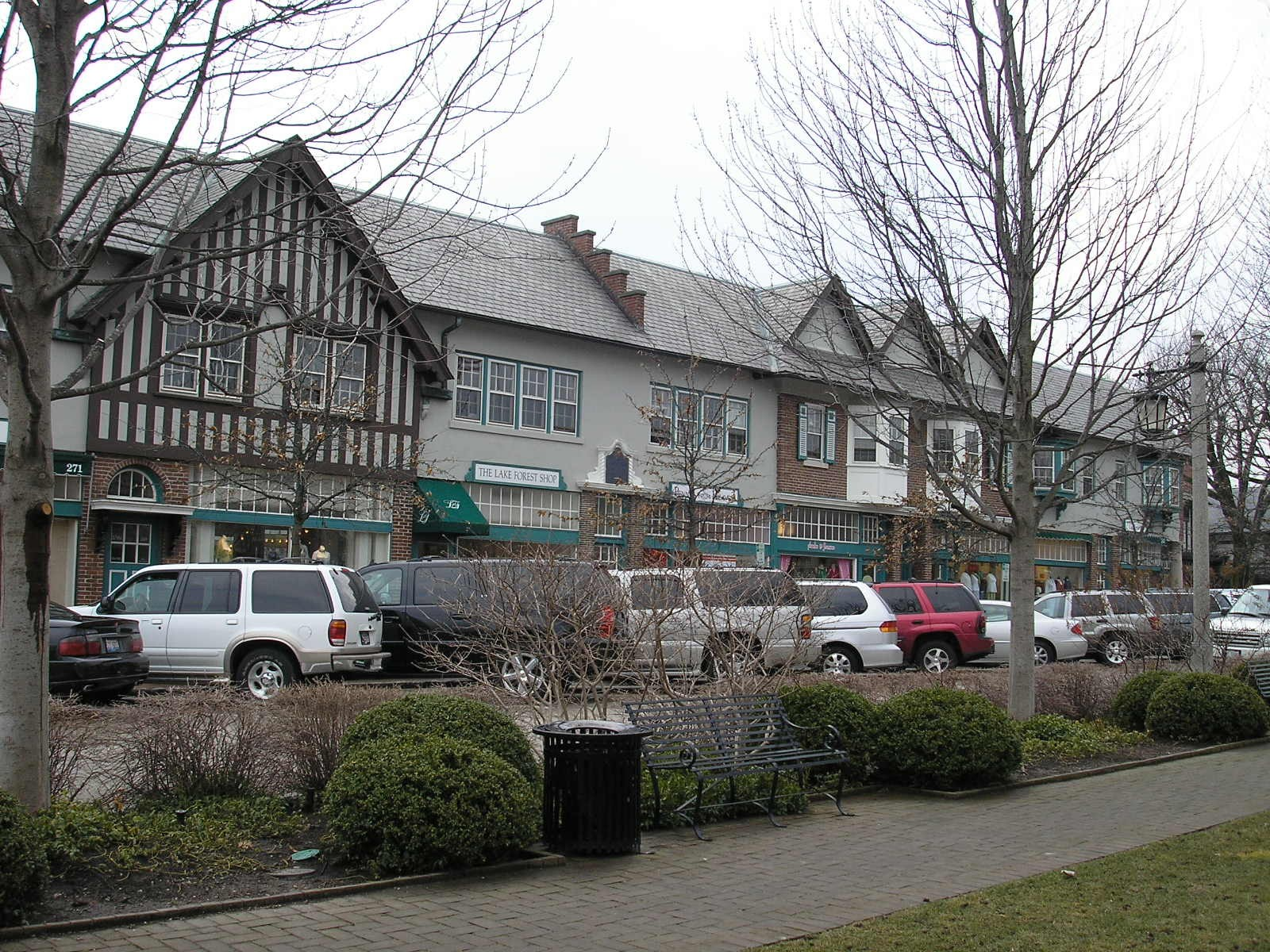
- Shaw's Market Square (1916), the first planned shopping center in the United States
- Born: May 7, 1869; Chicago, Illinois, U.S.
- Died: Death date|1926|05|06. Baltimore, Maryland, U.S.
- Education: Massachusetts Institute of Technology; Yale University
- Occupation: Architect
- Known for: Marktown (1917); Market Square (1916); Lakeside Press Building (1901); Ragdale (1897)
- Board member of: Art Institute of Chicago, Trustee
- Spouse: Frances Shaw née Wells
- Children: Sylvia Shaw Judson
- Parents: Theodore Andrews Shaw; Sarah (VanDoren) Shaw
- Awards: AIA Gold Medal

Howard Van Doren Shaw AIA (May 7, 1869 – May 6, 1926) was an architect in Chicago, Illinois. Shaw was a leader in the American Craftsman movement, best exemplified in his 1900 remodel of Second Presbyterian Church in Chicago. He designed Marktown, Clayton Mark's planned worker community in Northwest Indiana.

== Early life and career ==
Shaw was born in Chicago, Illinois, on May 7, 1869. His father Theodore was a dry goods businessman and was part of the planning committee for the World's Columbian Exposition. His Dutch-American mother Sarah (née Van Doren) was a prolific painter and a member of the Bohemian Club. Howard had one brother, Theodore Jr. His family resided at 2124 Calumet Avenue, then a part of the Prairie Avenue district, the heart of the social fabric of the city. Prairie Avenue was also the site of Chicago's most modern residential architecture, including Henry Hobson Richardson's John J. Glessner House. Howard Shaw met Frances Wells, his future wife, in the district's Bournique's dancing school on Twenty-Third Street. Wells was the daughter of Moses D. Wells, a prominent wholesale dry goods merchant.

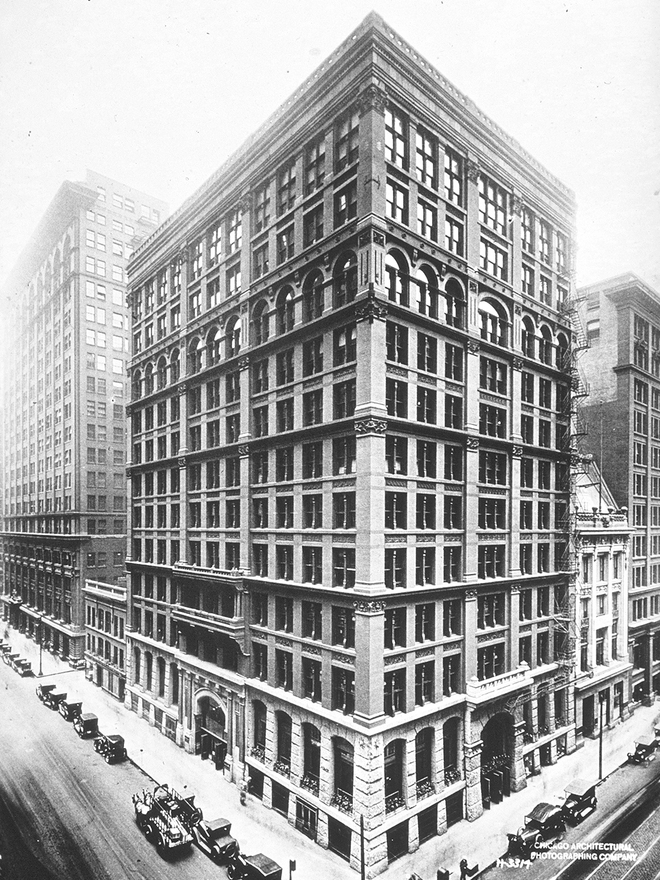
Shaw worked with Jenney & Mundie in the top floor of the Home Insurance Building in Chicago.

Shaw studied at the Harvard School for Boys in Hyde Park Township. He graduated from Yale University with a bachelor of arts in 1890. While at Yale, Shaw was the lead editor of The Yale Record, the world's oldest humor magazine. He was admitted to the Massachusetts Institute of Technology (MIT) later that year. MIT was one of the few architectural schools in the country at that time, closely following the rules set forth by the École des Beaux-Arts. Shaw completed the two-year program in one year. Shaw would use the elements of Georgian, Tudor, and neoclassical design he learned from MIT in most of his later works.

After returning to Chicago in June 1891, he joined the Jenney & Mundie firm. William Le Baron Jenney was emerging as an innovating designer, creating the first skyscrapers. His firm was already gaining a reputation as a training ground for new architects, such as Daniel Burnham and Louis Sullivan. Shaw worked directly with emerging architects James Gamble Rogers, Alfred Hoyt Granger, and D. Everett Waid. Shaw received his first commission from his wife's parents, who desired a new house in Lakeville, Connecticut. After the completion of the Wells house, he traveled to Europe to study the endemic architecture. He visited Spain, southern France, Italy, Austria-Hungary, Germany, and England.

Shaw spent two months in England before returning to Chicago. He rejoined Jenney & Mundie in early 1893, and on April 20, he married Francis Wells. Chicago architecture was receiving new recognition thanks to the success of the "White City" at the World's Columbian Exposition. Shaw worked on one last commission for the firm, the Snitzler house, in 1894.

In 1894, Shaw established his own practice while finishing his work for Jenney & Mundie in his father's attic on Calumet Avenue. His first solo commissions were for his father, who wanted one house for his daughter and son-in-law, and another for the newlywed Shaws. These two adjacent houses featured a combination of Queen Anne, Tudor, and Romanesque styles. The incorporation of Indiana Limestone set these houses apart from their neighbors.

Shaw soon received five other requests for buildings in the Hyde Park neighborhood. Hyde Park, recently annexed by Chicago, was the fastest-growing neighborhood, thanks to the recently opened University of Chicago. Shaw received the commissions from individuals who were familiar with his father and family.

Shaw's first major commission was for Richard R. Donnelley, cofounder of Lakeside Press. Donnelley's son, Thomas, had been a classmate at Yale and admired Howard's architecture. Shaw agreed to design a new printing plant for the company in 1897.

Lakeside Press published high-quality works, so it was necessary to reflect this in the building's design. Most printing press buildings of the age were built from wood to support the machines. However, Shaw used a more fireproof design, with concrete floors and reinforcement columns. The building was a success for Lakeside Press, and Shaw later received more commissions from Donnelly, including a 1902 addition to this building. As Shaw's business grew, he moved his offices into the Montauk Building in downtown Chicago.

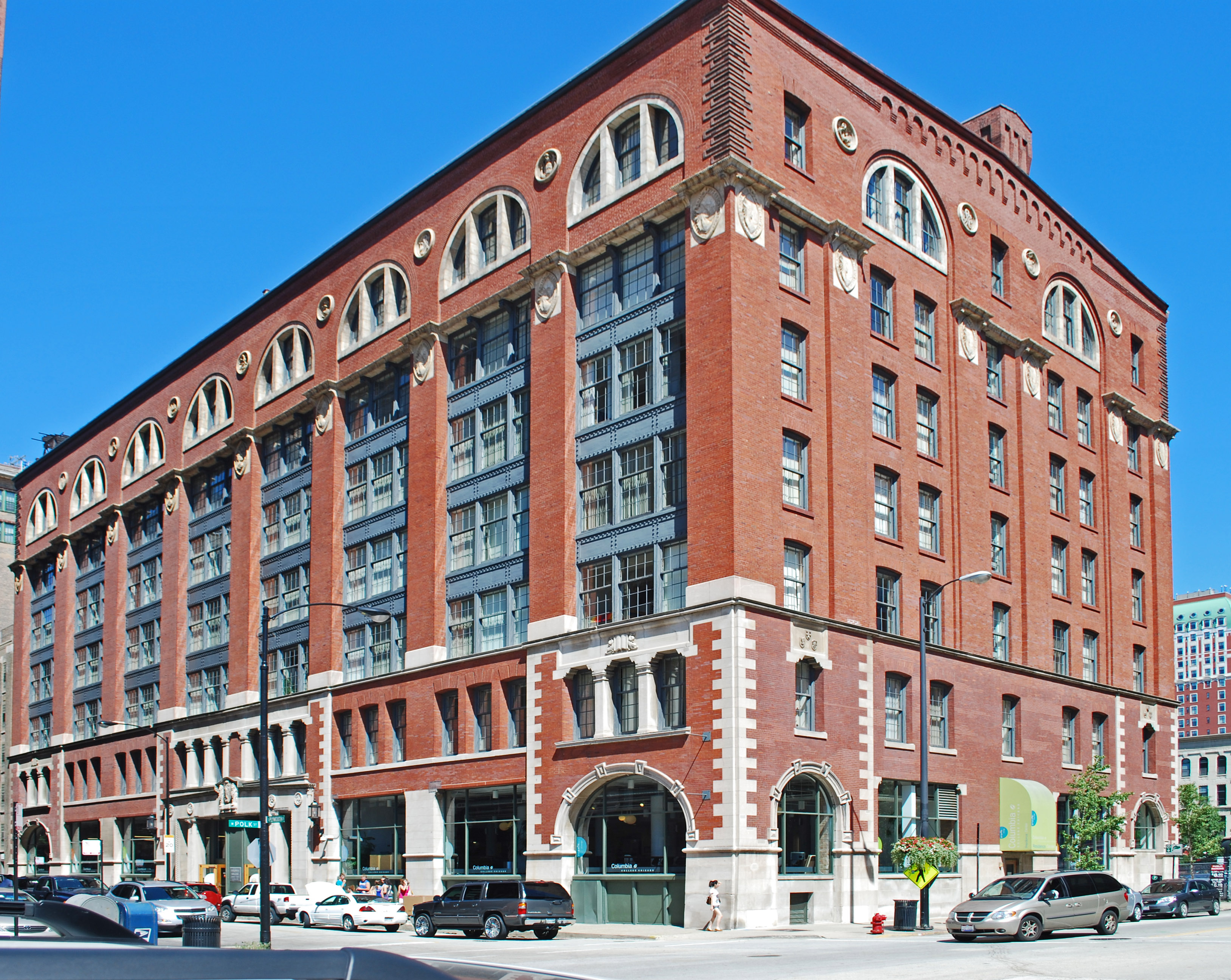
The Lakeside Press Building was Shaw's first major commission. Today it is recognized by the National Park Service as a historic place.

In 1897, Shaw bought a one-third share of a 53-acre (21 ha) farm on Green Bay Road in Lake Forest, Illinois. Lake Forest had been a rural community to the north of Chicago, but was recently becoming a retreat site for the wealthy following the completion of the Onwentsia Club in 1895. Shaw built a house for his family on the farm and built houses for Dr. William E. Casselberry and Dr. Nathan Smith Davis Jr., the other two owners of the property. These houses exhibited Shaw's first forays into the Arts and Crafts Movement. Shaw's house, Ragdale, is today considered one of the best examples of Arts and Crafts architecture and is listed on the National Register of Historic Places. Shaw became interested in the movement after holding a joint exhibition for Chicago architecture and Arts and Crafts designers at the Art Institute of Chicago. Although the movement is characterized by designs from all over the world, Shaw focused on American and English styles. Shaw would meet with other Arts and Crafts architects, including Frank Lloyd Wright, in a lunch group known as The Eighteen, an early version of the Prairie School.

However, Shaw grew alienated from the Prairie School as he was a firm believer in the value of the old European architecture eschewed by the other architects.

Another early commission for Shaw was the rebuilding of the sanctuary of Second Presbyterian Church (Chicago, Illinois) following a devastating fire in March 1900. Shaw had been baptized and raised in the church and was just 31 at the time of the commission.

The design of the sanctuary reflects Shaw's interest in the Arts and Crafts movement and today it remains as one of the most intact religious Arts and Crafts interiors in the country.

== Later life and career ==
In the early 20th century, Shaw became the most recognized designer of country houses in Lake Forest. He typically designed houses either as an elongated rectangle, or as a building surrounding a courtyard. Shaw preferred to do the landscaping himself, but also collaborated with renowned landscape architect Jens Jensen.

As housing desirability for the wealthy waned in Hyde Park, it grew in the Gold Coast of Chicago, and Shaw quickly became the prominent architect in this neighborhood.

Shaw received another major commission in 1906, this time in the Chicago Loop. The sixteen-story Mentor Building was designed in the Chicago style, but also retained neoclassical elements. Unlike other buildings in the style, the Mentor buildings have clear base, middle, and top sections, reminiscent of European tradition. The building still stands today and is part of the Loop Retail Historic District. In 1910, he designed an eight-story apartment building in the Gold Coast that would become the first cooperatively owned apartment building in Chicago.

In 1910, Shaw moved his offices into the Mentor Building. Shortly thereafter, one of his top students, David Adler, left the firm to start his own practice.

Between 1910 and 1912, he designed and built Camp-Woods for Philadelphia, Pennsylvania banker James M. Willcox at Villanova, Pennsylvania.

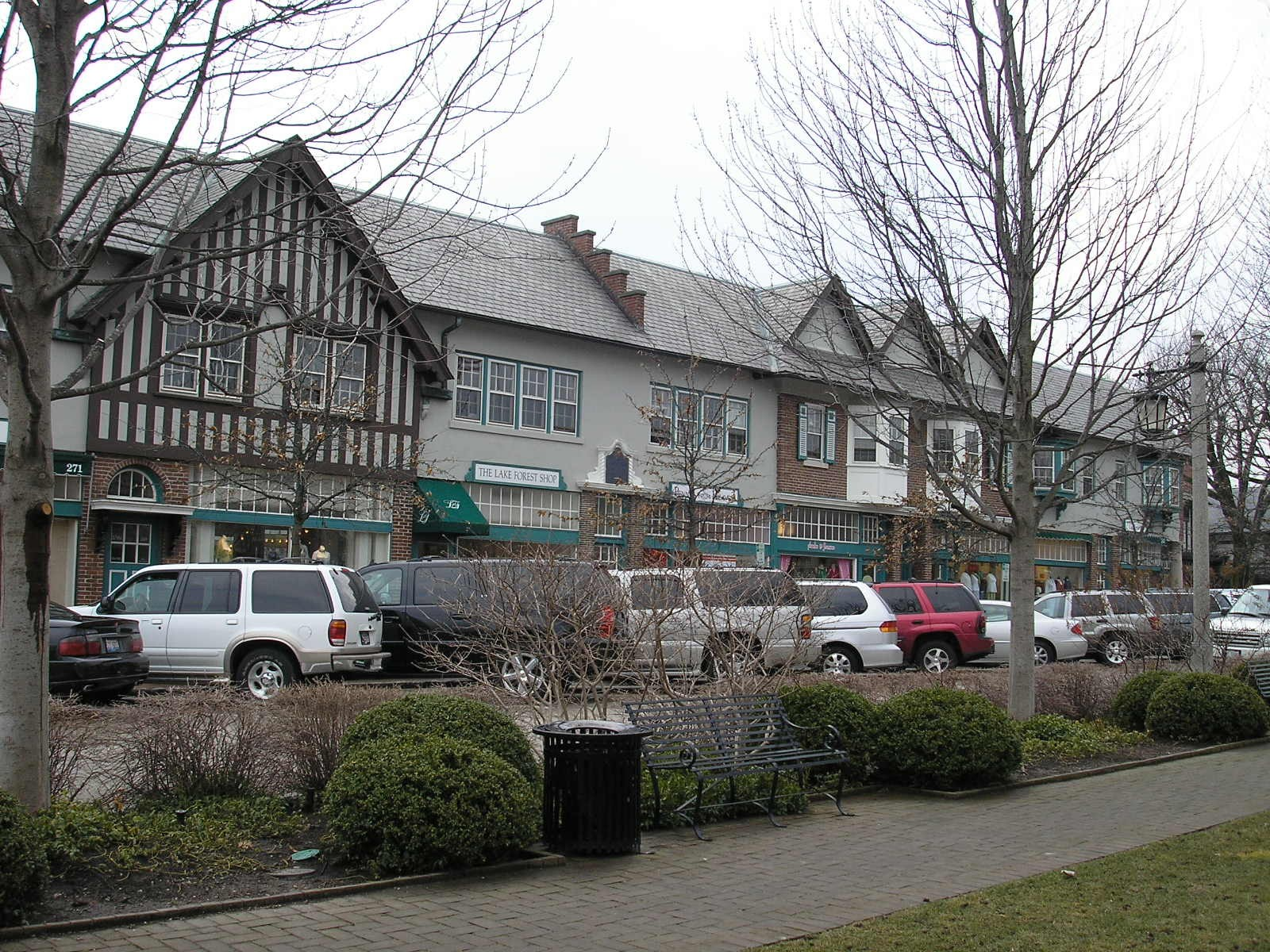
Shaw's Market Square was the nation's first shopping center designed for vehicles.

Although Lake Forest had become a magnet for the wealthy, the local commercial district was unkempt. The city sought to relieve this problem in 1912 by creating a "shopping center" where several businesses could operate out of one parcel of land.

Shaw was asked to design this center, and in 1915, he designed a U-shaped mall surrounding parking spaces and a central courtyard. Shaw collaborated with Edward H. Bennett on the design, a local architect that rose to prominence after co-authoring the Burnham Plan for Chicago. Shaw's design was inspired by a trip he made through Europe in 1913. Market Square became the first planned shopping center in the United States.

City planning became an important topic for architects following the completion of the Pullman District in the 1880s. Shaw made a foray into city planning with the construction of Marktown, Indiana for industrialist Clayton Mark, founder of Mark Manufacturing Company. Mark recently built a steel mill on the Indiana coast and wanted a company town to support it. Shaw designed the village and construction began in 1916. However, only a small portion of it was ever built, preserved today as the Marktown Historic District.

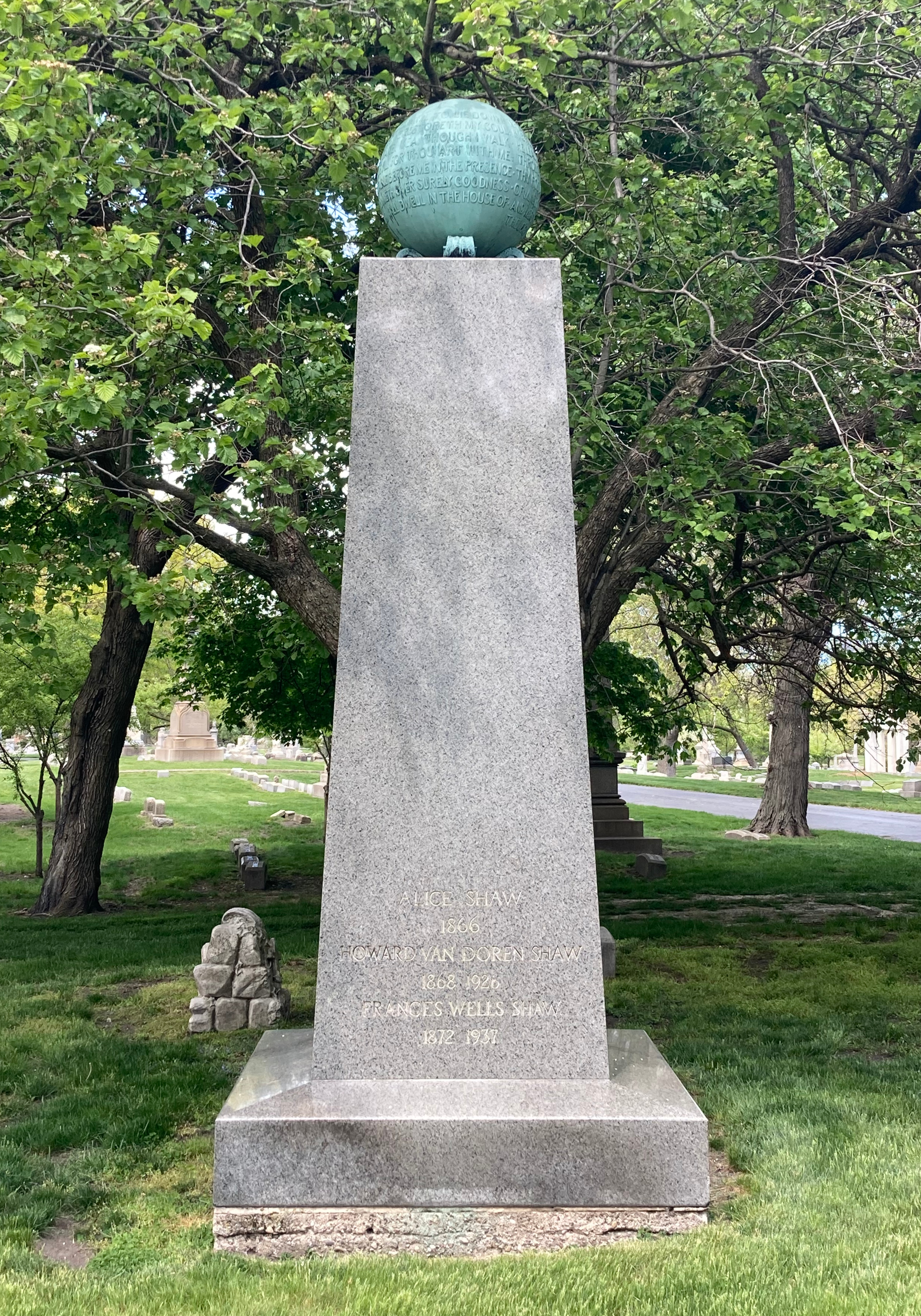
Shaw's grave at Graceland Cemetery

In 1921, Shaw was again contracted by R. R. Donnelley to build a printing plant, this time in Crawfordsville, Indiana. Donnelley would later commission a second Lakeside Press Building. Shaw also began to develop apartment buildings for the Gold Coast at this time. Shaw was a trustee at the Art Institute of Chicago and was asked to build several additions, including the central courtyard. He designed two fraternity houses for the University of Illinois at Urbana-Champaign and one at the University of Chicago.

In 1906, he became a member of the American Institute of Architects and was made a Fellow the following year. He was awarded its AIA Gold Medal shortly before his death in 1926. He is buried in Graceland Cemetery. Howard Shaw's students David Adler, R. Harold Zook, Harry W. J. Edbrooke, and Edward H. Bennett became notable architects in their own right. Shaw's daughter Sylvia became a noted sculptor.

== Influence and style ==
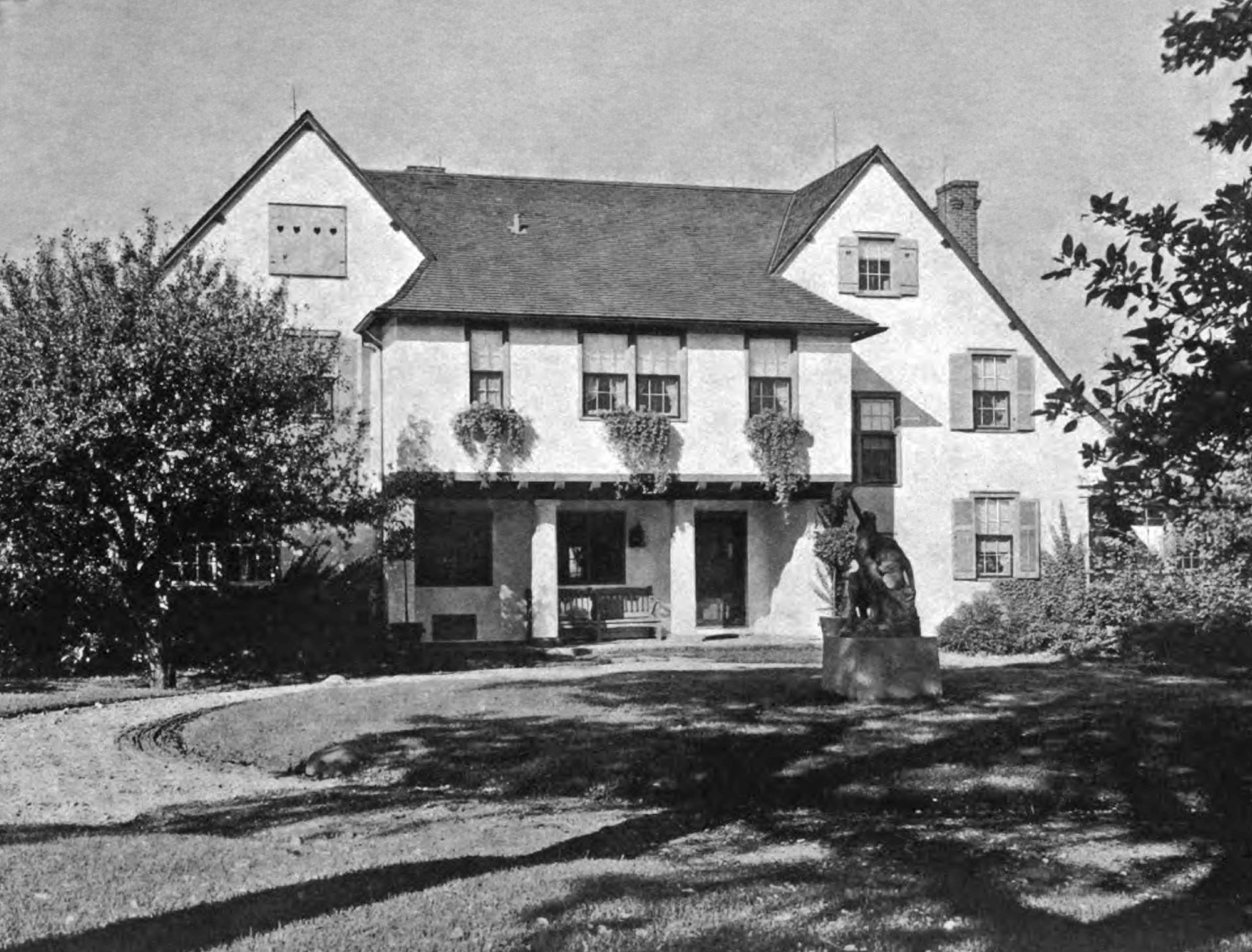
Ragdale, Howard Van Doren Shaw's own country house, was heavily influenced by his two-month stay in the United Kingdom

Shaw's European sojourn in the early 1890s weighed heavily on his future designs. In the United Kingdom, Shaw admired the work of Charles Rennie Mackintosh and Edwin Lutyens, who were combining Renaissance Revival architecture with modern design ideas. These architects eschewed mass-produced materials typical of the Industrial Revolution in favor of the decorative arts movement. Shaw was also influenced at this time by the writings of Reginald Blomfield, who argued in favor of using pre-industrial materials to design formal gardens, and William Robinson, who pioneered the idea of a wildlife garden. These emerging ideas would come to be known as the Arts and Crafts movement.

After his return to the United States, Shaw focused on designing single-family homes. These dwellings were considered the basic standard of living for the Craftsman movement. Ragdale was designed in close harmony with the movement in combination with Beaux-Arts English country house design.

== Gallery ==
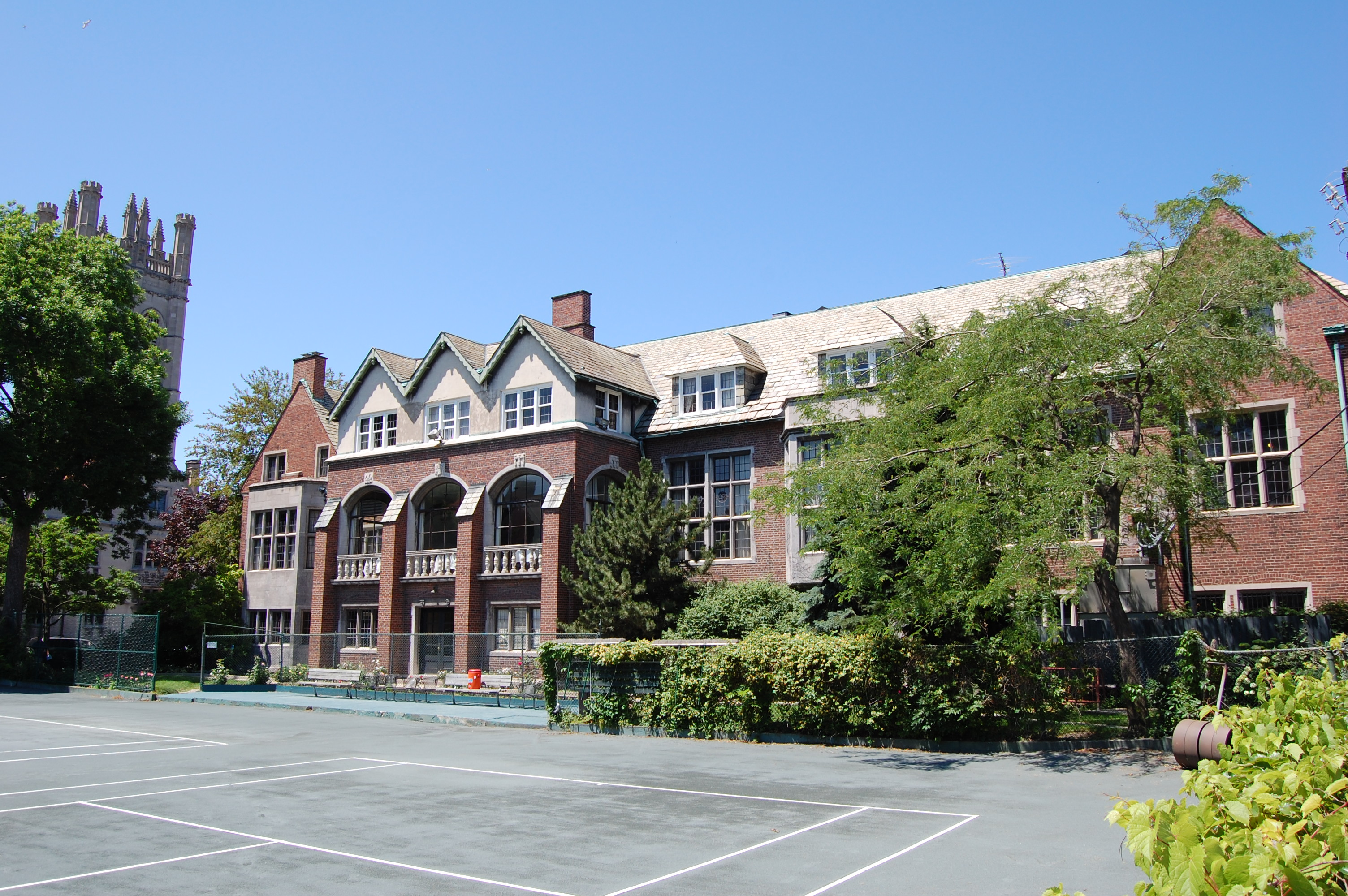
University of Chicago Quadrangle Club; Chicago, Illinois 1920

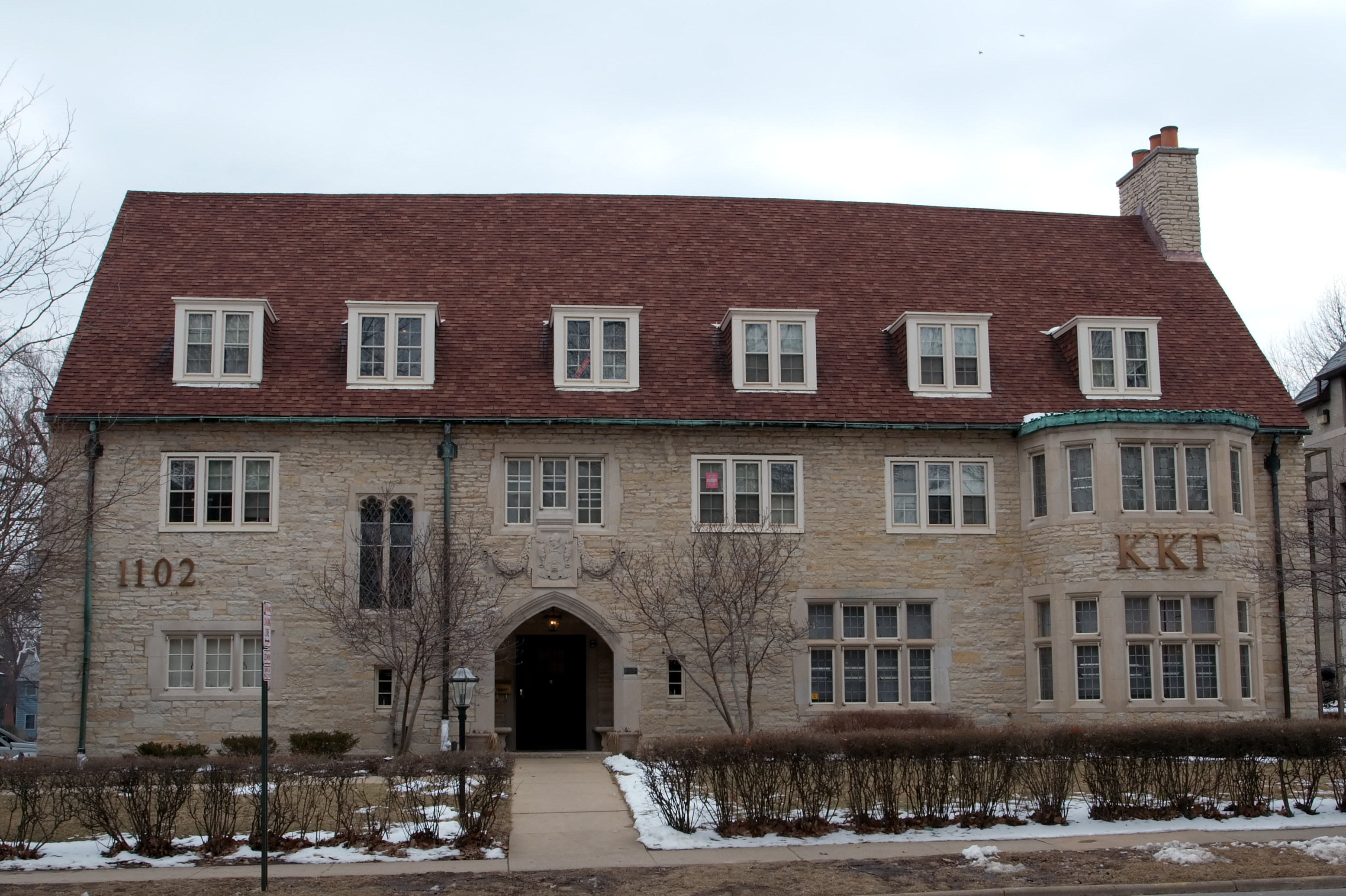
Kappa Kappa Gamma Sorority House; Urbana, Illinois 1921

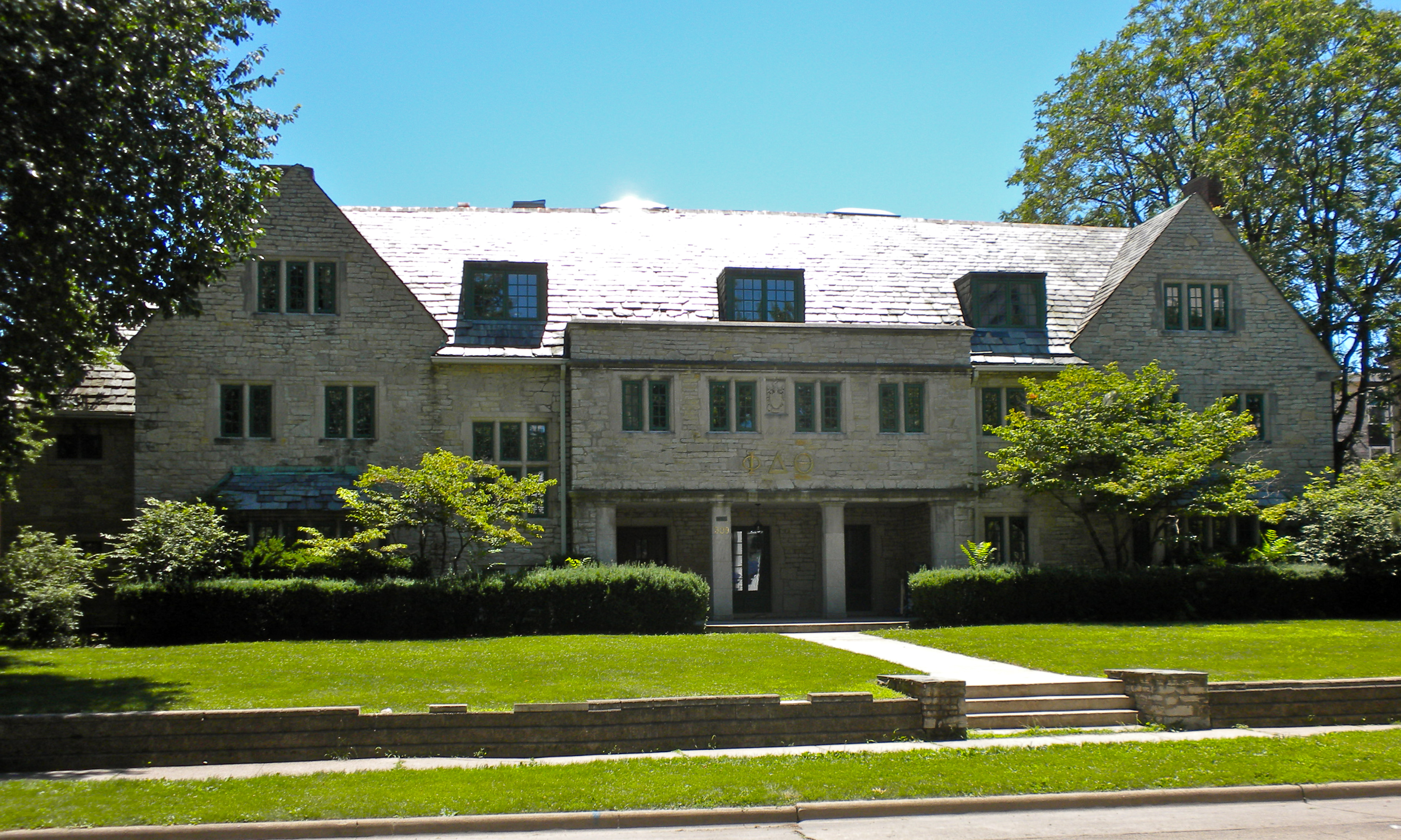
Phi Delta Theta fraternity house; Champaign, Illinois 1922

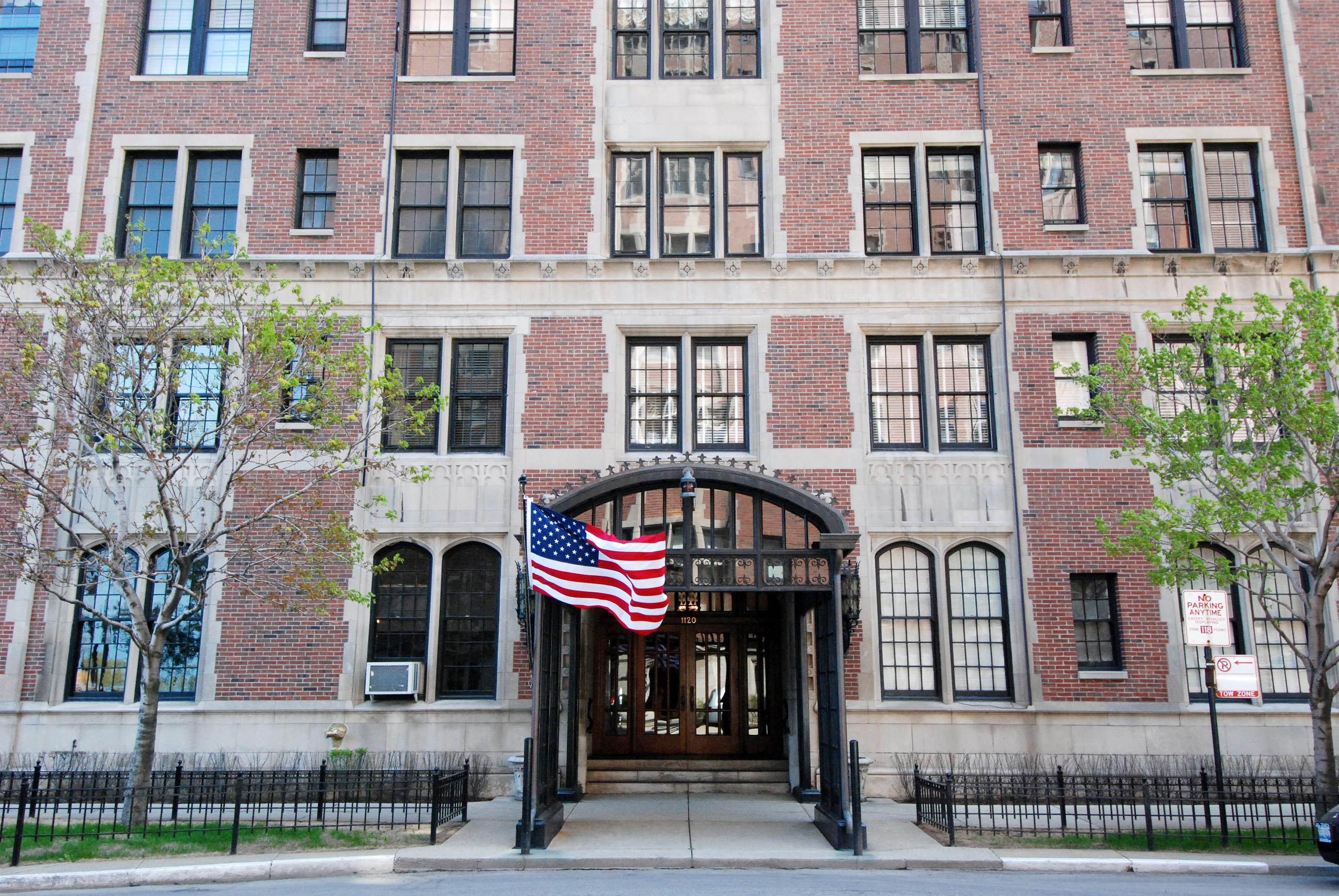
1120 Lake Shore Drive; Chicago, Illinois

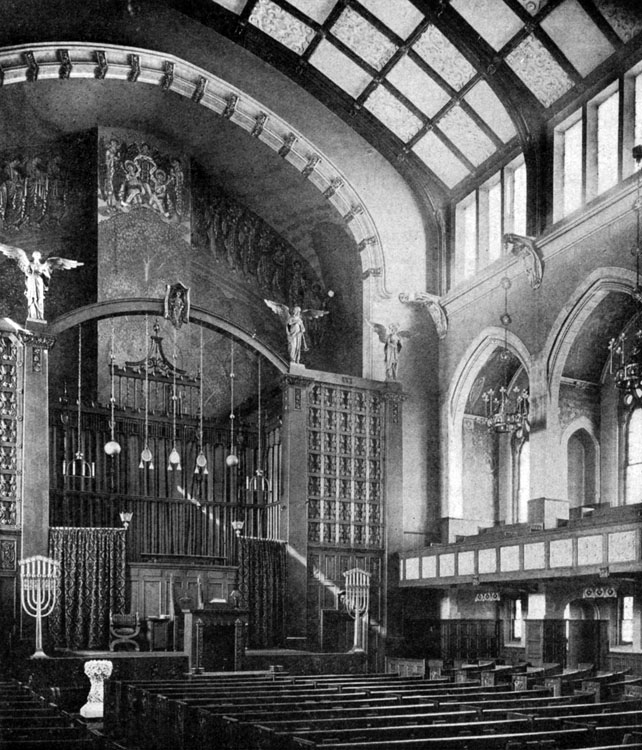
Sanctuary of Second Presbyterian Church, Chicago, c. 1902
