= Margery C. Carlson =

American botanist and academic (1892–1985)

Margery Claire Carlson
- Born: November 21, 1892; Arthur, Illinois
- Died: July 5, 1985 (aged 92); Evanston, Illinois
- Education: B.S. from Northwestern University; M.S. from University of Wisconsin; Ph.D in botany from University of Wisconsin
- Occupation: Botanist
- Years active: 1930–1958
- Employer(s): Northwestern University, Field Museum of Natural History
- Known for: Collection of new species, discovering Tillandsia carlsoniae
- Title: Professor of Botany
- Movement: Conservation
- Board member of: Illinois Youth Commission
- Partner: Kate Staley
- Awards: Eloise Payne Luquer Medal; Sarah Gildersleeve Fife Memorial Award; Margery C. Carlson Nature Preserve; Margery Carlson & Kate Staley Memorial Fellowship

Margery Claire Carlson (November 21, 1892 – July 5, 1985) was an American botanist and a professor at Northwestern University. After earning a Ph.D. in botany and becoming the first full-time female professor at Northwestern, she went on a number of international scientific expeditions to Central America in order to collect plant specimens and find new species. Her relationship as a research assistant at the Field Museum of Natural History meant that a majority of her plant collection was donated to the museum and a special botany collection was created for her there. Carlson had a long history of involvement in the conservation movement and was honored with multiple awards, along with a nature preserve being named after her.

== Childhood and education ==
Carlson was born in Arthur, Illinois. Her parents, John E. Carlson and Nellie Marie Johnson, named her after the marguerite daisy. She graduated with a bachelor's degree from Northwestern University in 1916 before earning a Master's degree and then a Ph.D. in botany by 1925 from the University of Wisconsin. Beginning in 1927, she worked in the research department at the University of Wisconsin. Carlson afterward became a teacher at Wellesley College before returning to Northwestern University in 1930 to become a professor, where she would stay for the next three decades before retiring in the 1960s.

She was the first woman to major in botany at Northwestern and the first woman to become a full professor at the university. Carlson also acted as a research assistant at the Field Museum for the specimens that she collected and the full collection they were a part of.

== Research ==
Carlson's botany research starting from 1927 focused on the development of orchids, including discovering ways to grow them in varied climates. She was able to create cultivars of domesticated orchids with reduced growing times thanks to the specialized feeding solution she devised. Beginning in 1933, she began researching ways of rapidly cultivating the grass pink orchid found on the shore of Lake Michigan. There was a large market for its close relative, the tropical orchid, but due to it only growing in a tropical climate and taking seven years to reach maturity, the species was in short supply and extremely expensive to obtain.

Carlson announced in October 1936 that she had succeeded in figuring out the cultivation method for the grass pink orchid, reducing its germination to flowering time period to only three years, and would have cheap seeds and bulbs available for the public soon after. She also moved her research focus onto accomplishing the same with the lady slipper orchid due to its population decreasing so much that it was at risk in many US states.

== Career ==
As a practicing botanist, Carlson made frequent trips to Mexico and Central America to search and catalog plant species in the regions. In a 1940 paper, Carlson described the first finding of a special type of seed coat found only in a few orchid species and surrounding the plant embryo. She described this as a "covering of the embryo" or an "inner seed coat".

=== White Nun expeditions (1945-1949) ===
During their first multi-country trip in 1945-1946 that was funded by both Northwestern University and the Field Museum, she and her life partner, Kate Staley, collected hundreds of pressed plant specimens and more than 100 living specimens were also returned from the trip, such as the White Nun orchid. For this trip, Carlson ended up being the first lead female expeditioner to ever travel to the mountains of El Salvador for a scientific project. Returning from their expedition on April 11, 1936, the living orchids and 4,000 plant samples representing 1,200 species of plants were sent through customs in New Orleans and the living samples planted in the Northwestern University greenhouses for future propagation.

Two years later beginning in December 1948 and extending into 1949, the pair conducted another trip, but without travel by plane or train, but by car for the entire trek. This botanical survey was funded by both Northwestern University and the Field Museum. They named their car El Caracol ("The Snail") due to how the back of the car was carrying everything they would need for the next six to nine months, their home "on its back". One of the main purposes of the trip was to find, photograph, and take samples of a new species of flower they had found on their prior expedition, but the photos of which had been lost and no sample had been taken at the time. Another purpose was to replace the White Nun orchid obtained in the 1946 trip, as many of the specimens from that time had been accidentally destroyed after a power failure in the university greenhouse during the middle of winter. During their trip, on April 6, 1949, they discovered a new species of Tillandsia in Chiapas that would later be described by L.B. Smith and named Tillandsia carlsoniae. In total, this second trip resulted in several thousand plant specimens collected, 300 of them living, and they were able to discover 15 new species of plants.

=== Later expeditions ===
Another trip was conducted from December 1951 to April 1952 and resulted in a collection of over 1,000 plant specimens and a number of new species, which were all donated to the Field Museum's botany collection. This third expedition traveled to Guatemala, El Salvador, and Honduras, with the pair aiming to be the first recorded people to travel the entire stretch of Guatemala by car along the Pan-American Highway. A significant portion of the three and a half month trip was spent in Chiapas, Mexico before moving through several countries to the cloud forests of Honduras. Five new species of ferns were catalogued there, along with an investigation into several mining sites along the route to look for fossilized plants at the request of botanists at the Field Museum.

A fourth trip began in December 1954 in order to collect Russelia species and determine their distribution, growth characteristics, and where samples in the existing museum collections had been taken from. Carlson traced the origins of the plant throughout Mexico, focusing particularly on a canyon near Iguala where Russelia pringlei had been identified and named by Cyrus Pringle in 1906. The end of the trip continued on into El Salvador and Honduras following Russelia traces before she returned to the US in June 1955.

Carlson would make numerous international trips throughout her career, involving the countries of Costa Rica, El Salvador, Guatemala, Honduras, and Mexico. Of the plant family Bromeliaceae alone, she discovered 25 new species and 19 of them were found just within the region of Chiapas. She retired in 1958 from being an active professor at Northwestern University, but remained working as a research assistant at the Field Museum and continued conducting collecting expeditions, primarily in Mexico.

After the creation of a state park committee in December 1961 to advise governor Otto Kerner Jr. on how to keep up preservation efforts for the Illinois Beach State Park, Carlson was picked as one of the two members of her region to be on the ten person board. Governor Kerner also added her to the board of the Illinois Youth Commission in 1964.

== Legacy and accolades ==
Carlson was a founder of the Illinois Chapter of the Nature Conservancy. In the 1960s, a wildflower garden in Evanston, Illinois's Lighthouse Park was named after her. An official nature preserve was named after her in 1976, with the "Margery C. Carlson Nature Preserve" being in LaSalle County.

She was awarded the Eloise Payne Luquer Medal in 1952 and the Sarah Gildersleeve Fife Memorial Award in 1954, both from the Garden Club of America. The organization Graduate Women in Science made her an honorary member in 1978 and later named a fellowship award after Carlson titled the "Margery Carlson & Kate Staley Memorial Fellowship".

== Personal life ==
Carlson lived in Evanston, Illinois with her partner Kate Staley, a former physiologist who had retired and accompanied Carlson on many of her expeditions. She was a member of the Sigma Delta Epsilon fraternity for women in science and acted as secretary for the national branch.

She was an active conservationist and promoter of protecting wilderness in Illinois. Carlson was made an adviser for the Evanston Garden Club and herself joined a number of professional organizations related to botany and environmental organizations in the area. Her conservation efforts focused on areas such as Volo Bog, Illinois State Beach, and Matthiessen State Park.

== Selected works ==
- Morphological and Cytological Studies of Saprolegnia Sp. (1920), University of Wisconsin–Madison
- Gametogenesis and fertilization in Achlya racemosa (1929), University of Wisconsin–Madison
- Monograph of the Genus Russelia (Scrophulariaceae) (1957), Field Museum of Natural History

The standard author abbreviation Carlson is used to indicate this person as the author when citing a botanical name.
