= Cyrus Mark =

American conservationist (1900–1983)

Curys Mark
- Born: June 3, 1900
- Died: February 8, 1983 (aged 82)
- Parent: Clayton Mark

Cyrus Mark (June 3, 1900 – February 8, 1983) was a prominent early advocate of nature conservancy in the state of Illinois. Mark served as the first executive director of the Illinois chapter of The Nature Conservancy. He was instrumental in the first Nature Conservancy acquisition in the Chicago area; Volo Bog. In 1958, Mark, along with George Fell, the first president of the Nature Conservancy, negotiated the purchase of Volo Bog by The Nature Conservancy.

Mark, botanist Dr. Margery Carlson, the secretary of the Illinois chapter of The Nature Conservancy, and many others raised almost 1300 contributions from organizations and individuals (including teachers and students) to cover the cost of the acquisition. This was the first time in the chapter's history that there was an appeal to the public for help in raising funds. Mark employed many strategies in his fund-raising efforts from emphasizing the scientific and educational values of the land, to pointing out that contributions were tax-deductible. After its purchase by the Nature Conservancy, Volo Bog was conveyed to the University of Illinois and then to the State of Illinois for protection.

== Biography ==
Mark was the son of Clayton Mark, one of the pioneer makers of steel pipe in the United States and the founder of Marktown, a planned worker community listed on the National Register of Historic Places. Cyrus Mark was educated at Yale University and the University of Iowa. In 1923 he began work at Clayton Mark & Co. as an assistant treasurer. He held various positions including plant manager, vice president, and became president, general manager and director in 1943. Cyrus retired as president in 1963. Cyrus always had an interest in birds and conservation. He was also the chairman of the Illinois Nature Conservancy and a director of the national Nature Conservancy.
