= Sylvia Shaw Judson =

American artist (1897–1978)

- Born: June 30, 1897; Chicago, Illinois, U.S.
- Died: August 31, 1978 (aged 81); Lake Forest, Illinois, U.S.
- Resting place: Graceland Cemetery
- Education: School of the Art Institute of Chicago
- Known for: Sculpture
- Notable work: Bird Girl

Sylvia Shaw Judson (June 30, 1897 – August 31, 1978) was a professional sculptor who worked first in Chicago and later in Lake Forest, Illinois. She created a broad range of sculptural artworks, notably garden pieces depicting children and animals. For more than fifty years she sculpted life-size human figures in an era when critics and curators favored abstract works. Many years after she died, her serenely simple Bird Girl came to be widely known and admired.

A child of a well-to-do family, Sylvia Shaw Judson enjoyed idyllic carefree summers and the benefits of private schools, foreign travel, social connections, and several years of training and internship with the best teachers. Even after she became an acclaimed artist in her own right, she continued to be identified as the daughter of Howard Van Doren Shaw, a prominent architect who died in 1926, early in her career. She called him "the most important influence on my life as a sculptor."

Forty years after her father's death, Judson dedicated her book For Gardens and Other Places to him, and wrote that "he intended me to be his own private sculptor." But as much as she evidently wished to give him credit for her success, it was largely the result of her own artistic creativity and hard work. The exact number of works she created is uncertain, probably about eighty in all. They were meant to be objects of quiet contemplation, and most are not on public view.

== Early life and education ==
Sylvia was born in Chicago in 1897, to Frances Wells Shaw, a poet and playwright, and architect Howard Van Doren Shaw. They lived in upscale Hyde Park, not far from the University of Chicago. In the same year her father bought 50 acres of land on Green Bay Road in Lake Forest (40 miles (64 km) north of Hyde Park) and started building an English Arts and Crafts country house that would be the family's summer home. He called it "Ragdale." They had a meadow and virgin prairie, an old farmhouse and barn, a cottage for the farmer, an orchard, vegetable garden, pasture for horses and cows, sheds for chickens and sheep, and even an outdoor theater where Sylvia and her sisters recited poems and acted out their mother's plays. Sylvia spent most of her summers in this bucolic setting, and it profoundly influenced her sculpture.

She was educated at the University of Chicago Laboratory School and School for Girls, and in 1914-15 attended Westover School, a college preparatory school for girls in Middlebury, Connecticut. She had decided to become a sculptor, and in a school magazine essay she wrote confidently, "My specialty is going to be garden pieces." She spent the summer of 1915 working as an intern with Anna Hyatt at her studio on Cape Ann in Massachusetts.

Instead of going to college, she enrolled at the School of the Art Institute of Chicago for intensive training in human figure sculpting under Albin Polasek. Sylvia interrupted her studies in 1917 for an extended tour of the Far East with her father (Note: Sylvia and her father spent four months in China via the Philippines, Japan, and Korea. Indicative of the Shaw family's social connections, their companions on that trip were Joy Morton and members of his family. Joy was a businessman of national stature and founder of Morton Salt (headquartered in Chicago), who established the Morton Arboretum in 1922.) that she said was a continuing influence, especially Chinese animal sculpture. After graduating from SAIC in 1918, she briefly rented a small studio in New York City, but "feeling the need for more study" she went to Paris.

Studying with Antoine Bourdelle at the Académie de la Grande Chaumière broadened her perspective. Years later she wrote, "At that time it was a rediscovered idea that a work of sculpture should be a work of architecture in itself." In the sculpture of Aristide Maillol she valued "a passionate striving for unity and simplicity, a paring down, but together with a fullness of form, a growing outward from within," all of which would be attributes of her own subsequent work.

== Early professional experience ==
Sylvia Shaw married Clay Judson (an attorney) in 1921. Their daughter Alice was born in 1922 and in that year Sylvia declared that she was a professional sculptor. They lived in an apartment in Chicago and she set up her studio in a shared basement laundry room. One of the first sculptures she created as a professional was the amusing Naughty Faun (1923). In 1925 three-year-old Alice posed for the curiously endearing half girl / half fish Merchild, her face hidden by her curls as she tries to pry open an oyster; for this work, Judson was awarded an honorable mention at the Arts Club of Chicago exhibition in the following year.

In the year of her first professional award, 1926, her son Clay Jr. was born and her beloved father died at 57 years of age. He had become a nationally prominent architect, awarded the Gold Medal of the American Institute of Architects. Judson called him the most important influence on her life as a sculptor. At prep school she had written that he had encouraged her to create sculpture for the gardens of large estates. During the next two years she conceived a garden sculpture that would, in her lifetime, be her best known and most successful work: Little Gardener. (Note: Names and dates can be puzzling. In Judson's 1967 book For Gardens and Other Places, the Little Gardener is called Gardener and the date given is 1935 (evidently when the copy shown was cast). Judson sometimes referred to a work by more than one name, and some of her works are displayed with names she never gave them; for example, at Friends Hospital in Philadelphia, the little carved-limestone boy she called Winter has a plaque that says "Boy Feeding Bird".)

Seven-year-old Alice posed for the Little Gardener: barefoot, wearing just a cap and smock, holding a potted plant at her shoulder, a garden trowel in her other hand, a watering can at her feet, symbolizing hope and joy and seeming to look on life with "quiet eyes" (words from a Frances Wells Shaw poem that would be the title of Sylvia's 1954 book). Judged Best American Sculpture in 1929, it was awarded the Logan Prize, rarely given for sculpture. (Judson was the only woman sculptor ever to receive this coveted award in its 70-year history.) Selected in 1964 for the Jacqueline Kennedy Garden at the White House, where it has been standing ever since, and another copy presented to the Philippines in 1966 by President Johnson as a gift from the American people. In 1968, for admission to full membership in the National Academy of Design, Judson was required to submit a work that she regarded as her best; she chose the Little Gardener. (Note: In this article a few sculptures are described interpretively to help readers visualize what they look like. Interpretive descriptions of artworks are, of course, subjective and debatable.)

In 1936 Judson asked a 9-year-old girl to pose for a figure whose tilted head and sad eyes make it appear that she is resigned to her fate: her slender arms must forever hold two bowls. This image, reminiscent of female forms in Classical Greek architecture, is echoed in the deep folds of her long skirt, which are shaped like the flutes of a Grecian column. Judson gave her various names, but not until 1967, when her photo was on the cover of Judson's book, did she have the name by which the public would come to know her, many years later: Bird Girl.

An important milestone in Sylvia Shaw Judson's career came in 1938: her first one-person show, organized by the Art Institute of Chicago and circulated to art museums in Wisconsin, Indiana, Michigan, and Ohio. Bird Girl was at the center of eighteen sculptures in the exhibition, but at that time she was known as Fountain Figure, which may hint that Judson originally intended for her to stand above a garden pool, water gently flowing from her bowls. (Note: Twelve of the 18 pieces in the 1938 exhibition are not mentioned in Judson's 1967 book. She had come to national attention in 1964-66 for her 1929 Little Gardener and may have wanted to feature the work she had done in recent years; two-thirds of the artworks in the book were created in the 1950s and 1960s.)

== Return to Ragdale ==
The Judsons made Ragdale their year-round residence beginning in 1942, and she built a studio out in the meadow. Sylvia's mother had died in 1937 and Sylvia now owned the house. Her return to the haven of her youth coincided with new interests. Her sentiments were pacifist, and in 1939 she had begun donating her business profits to support Quaker causes. In 1949 she became a member of the Society of Friends (Quaker). In 1952 she was instrumental in establishing the Lake Forest Friends Meeting and building a meeting house on land donated by a friend, Sidney Haskins. Her 1954 book, The Quiet Eye, sought to persuade Quakers that visual art can respect the spiritual convictions of their faith.

Sylvia won a competition in 1957 for a monument to Mary Dyer (courageous Quaker martyr hanged by Puritans in 1660). Seven feet high, this was the largest sculpture Judson ever made. It took her two years (1958–59) to sculpt it, supervise its casting, and see it installed on the grounds of the Massachusetts State House in Boston. It depicts a woman in Quaker attire seated on a meeting house bench, her head bowed, her hands in her lap, steely resolve evident in her eyes. Judson's model, whose likeness she captured in this statue, was a member of the Lake Forest Friends Meeting.

Her husband of 39 years, Clay Judson, died in 1960. After his death Sylvia explored new forms and activities. In 1961-62 she experimented with religious art in an unfamiliar medium, sandcasting Stations of the Cross, fourteen low relief bronze plaques for a Catholic church. In 1963 she married Sidney Haskins (Note: She became Sylvia Haskins in 1963, but kept Sylvia Shaw Judson as her professional name and used it for her 1967 book. In print interviews and news articles about her work she is occasionally referred to as Mrs. Haskins.) and accepted an invitation to teach a sculpture course in 1963–64 at the American University in Cairo, Egypt. She had never taught before and had to organize what she had come to believe about her art in order to pass it on. "Ideas grow and change in this process," she wrote.

Judson paid homage to Ragdale in Apple Tree Children (1967) by using a real tree from the orchard as the major element. Two cast bronze children are in the tree: a 10-year-old girl leans back against a branch, trying to concentrate on reading a book while a 6-year-old boy climbs higher on another branch, doing his best to disturb her concentration, perhaps recalling the summer of 1932 when Alice and Clay Jr. were those ages and may have climbed that very tree.

Judson's last major work, created in 1969, shows two children in a playful pose: a 3-year-old boy on the shoulder of a 12-year-old girl, looking into each other's eyes, finding joy and fun in their friendship. This is the only work in which she joined two children in one figure; in her previous sculptures, children were always separate individuals. The name she gave it was Friends, a name with additional significance for her as a Quaker.

In 1971 Sylvia and her husband moved to a Quaker retirement community near Philadelphia, but she often returned to Ragdale to work in her studio. She and her daughter Alice were determined to preserve Ragdale, fearing that a future owner might demolish the house and subdivide the land. In 1975 Judson gave nearly half of her land (more than 20 acres) to the Nature Conservancy. In 1976, when Ragdale house was listed on the National Register of Historic Places, she deeded it to Alice, who proceeded to establish the Ragdale Foundation as a retreat for artists and writers. (Note: After creating the Ragdale Foundation in 1976, Alice Judson Ryerson Hayes headed it during the 1980s. It has become a leading residential retreat for creative people. In 1986 she gave all the Ragdale buildings and grounds to the City of Lake Forest, to be used by the Foundation. In the 2000s Ragdale house was structurally renovated and restored to the way it looked in 1926, at a cost of $3,200,000 raised through private donations.)

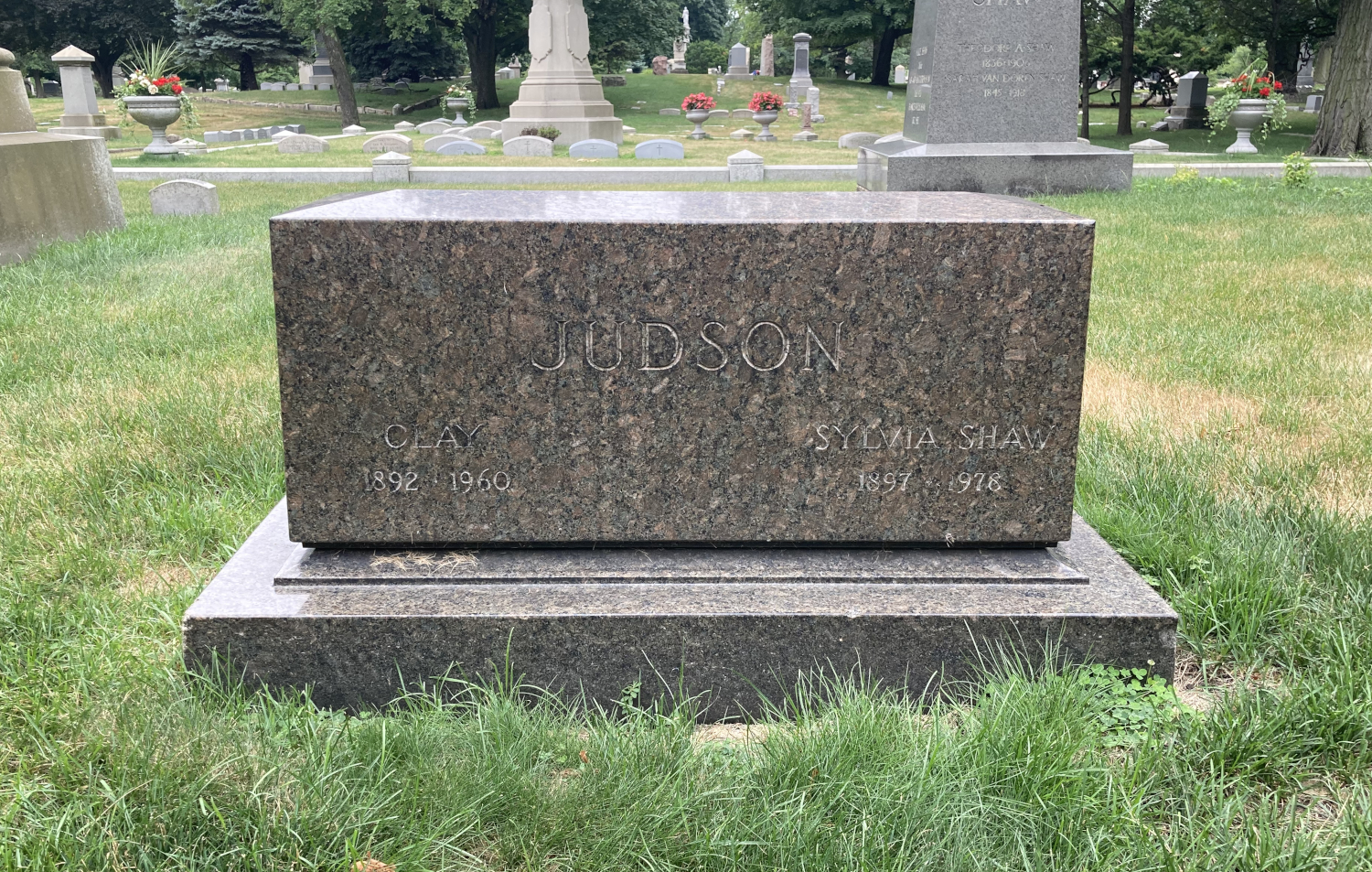
Judson's grave at Graceland Cemetery

Judson died at Ragdale in 1978, aged 81, and was buried at Graceland Cemetery in Chicago. Three years earlier she arranged for her plaster models and casting molds to be destroyed after her death to prevent unauthorized copies from being made. What she evidently forgot is that she had given some of her original plaster models (including Little Gardener and Bird Girl) to public elementary schools in the 1950s and 1960s to make fine art accessible to youngsters and imbue them with a sense of appreciation for art. (Note: For security reasons the sculptures that are in public schools are not included in the list of works on public view.)

== Belated fame ==
Sixteen years after she died, Judson suddenly became nationally known after the publication in 1994 of the sensational Midnight in the Garden of Good and Evil, whose cover was a hauntingly beautiful photo of a sculpture in Savannah's Bonaventure Cemetery. The book stayed on the New York Times bestseller list for a record 216 weeks and crowds of tourists descended on Savannah hoping to glimpse the little cast-bronze girl whose weary arms seemed to be weighing good and evil. At that time Judson was virtually unknown, and she was dramatically rediscovered when the remarkable figure turned out to be one that she created in 1936: Bird Girl. To stop illegal copying, her daughter Alice (as executor of Judson's artistic estate) in 1998 authorized the sale of accurate replicas in reduced sizes, with royalties supporting the Ragdale Foundation. Tens of thousands have been sold, reflecting the timeless appeal of her work. (Note: Artworks are protected by copyright laws even after the artist has died, but it is not easy to defend the artist's rights. Alice attempted to sue violators, but concluded that this was futile. The problem vanished in 1999 when high-quality authorized copies became available through Potina (Charlotte, NC art firm owned by Brian Caldwell).)

An original bronze copy of Bird Girl sold at auction in 2021 for more than $390,000.

== Renewed interest in Judson's work ==
In 1994 it was discovered that a school had the original plaster model of Bird Girl, from which molds could be made to cast a posthumous copy for Ragdale. Then in 2009 it was remembered that Judson gave the original plaster models of other sculptures to schools – the art world thought they had been destroyed; they were not labelled, so some schools were not sure what they were; and a few were damaged. The Little Gardener plaster model was repaired and digitally scanned in 2012 to create an exact replica; Judson's granddaughter and executor, Francie Shaw (Alice's daughter, an artist), authorized reduced-size copies of this work to be sold to growing numbers of Judson enthusiasts and collectors.

In 2016 the City of Lake Forest learned that for 34 years the statue in the fountain in Market Square had the wrong name, and installed a new plaque with the name Judson gave it: Friends. Four original copies (Note: The common impression that there can be only one original copy of a sculpture is wrong. Any copy that Judson authorized in her lifetime is by definition an original copy. To make her works more affordable, she authorized limited editions to be cast (four copies of a major work, as a rule); her patrons understood that their copy was not unique.) made in 1970-77 were called Friends in newspaper and magazine articles, but when a posthumous copy was cast for Market Square in 1982, the name Judson chose for the statue was somehow forgotten and its plaque said Girl with Baby on Shoulder. (Note: Girl with Baby on Shoulder is what the statue was called at the foundry when it was being cast, but that title misled many people to think the girl was a mother and the boy was her baby, not what Judson intended the work to symbolize. Coincidentally, in 2012 the Chicago Botanic Garden discovered that more than 30 years earlier they had been given incorrect names and dates for two Judson sculptures; also, in 2013 they restored their 90-year-old Naughty Faun.)

== Works on public view (by year originally created) ==
| 1923 | Naughty Faun | Glencoe, IL | Chicago Botanic Garden (Herb Garden) |
| 1925 | Merchild | Glencoe, IL | Chicago Botanic Garden (Regenstein Center reflecting pool) |
| 1929 | Little Gardener | Washington, DC | The White House (Jacqueline Kennedy Garden) |
| 1932 | Girl with a Squirrel | Murrells Inlet, SC | Brookgreen Gardens |
| 1934 | Young Woman | Dayton, OH | Dayton Art Institute |
| 1936 | Bird Girl | Savannah, GA | Telfair Museum of Art |
| 1936 | Bird Girl | Riverwoods, IL | Ryerson Conservation Area (Brushwood Center) |
| 1938 | Winter | Philadelphia, PA | Friends Hospital (Bonsall Building garden) |
| 1938 | Winter | Chicago, IL | The Newberry Library (near front entrance) |
| 1945 | Harbor Seal | Highland Park, IL | Public Library (garden) |
| 1946 | Boy Reading | Highland Park, IL | Public Library (lobby) |
| 1947 | Little Niece | Davenport, IA | Figge Art Museum |
| 1950 | Two Children | Lake Forest, IL | First Presbyterian Church (sanctuary) |
| 1950 | Madonna | Hillside, IL | Queen of Heaven Cemetery |
| 1950 | Madonna | Greenwich, CT | Covenant of the Sacred Heart |
| 1952 | Mother and Child | Lake Forest, IL | Hospital Center for Women's Health (Healing Garden) |
| 1952 | Guardian Angel | Chicago, IL | Rush University (Moved to Armour Academic Center lobby, 1998, after demolition of Schweppe Hall/Schweppe-Sprague Hall, dedicated 1952, where the bas-relief sculpture was installed above building entrance.) |
| 1954 | Roosevelt Fountain | Brookfield. IL | Brookfield Zoo (memorial columns symbolizing wildlife associated Theodore Roosevelt, in the middle of the park) |
| 1955 | Violinist | Highland Park, IL | Ravinia Festival (atop fountain outside Murray Theater) |
| 1955 | Violinist | Lake Forest, IL | Lake Forest Bank (Bank Lane, lobby) |
| 1955 | Dancer (Ballerina) | Highland Park, IL | Ravinia Festival (atop fountain to right of Pavilion) |
| 1955 | Dancer (Ballerina) | Lake Forest, IL | Lake Forest Bank (Bank Lane, lobby) |
| 1955 | Dancer (Ballerina) | Evanston, IL | Evanston Township High School (Senior Courtyard) |
| 1958 | Monument to Mary Dyer | Boston, MA | Massachusetts State House (lawn) |
| 1958 | Monument to Mary Dyer | Philadelphia, PA | Friends Center |
| 1958 | Monument to Mary Dyer | Richmond, IN | Earlham College |
| 1959 | Birds on Eggs | Glencoe, IL | Chicago Botanic Garden (Vegetable Garden) |
| 1960 | Girl with Piglet | Brookfield, IL | Brookfield, IL Brookfield Zoo (close to Bramsen Animal Ambassador Pavilion, near Hamill Family Wild Encounters; also called Zoo Children) |
| 1960 | Boy with Chicken | Brookfield, IL | Brookfield, IL Brookfield Zoo (close to Bramsen Animal Ambassador Pavilion, near Hamill Family Wild Encounters; also called Zoo Children) |
| 1961 | Stations of the Cross | Winnetka, IL | Sacred Heart Church |
| 1963 | Raintree Fountain | Lisle, IL | Morton Arboretum (Sterling Morton Library) |
| 1963 | Raintree Fountain | Lake Forest, IL | Lake Forest Hospital (Chapel) |
| 1967 | Apple Tree Children | Lake Forest, IL | Public Library (Children's Library) |
| 1968 | Acorn Gateposts | Lisle, IL | Morton Arboretum (Arbor Court) |
| 1969 | Friends | Philadelphia, PA | Friends Hospital |
| 1969 | Friends | Lake Forest, IL | Market Square Fountain |
| 1973 | Geese | Lake Bluff, IL | Public Library (garden) |
| 1974 | Dancing Boy | Lake Forest, IL | Market Square (#266 gable niche) |

== Books by Sylvia Shaw Judson ==
- The Quiet Eye, A Way of Looking at Pictures: Henry Regnery, Chicago, 1954, ISBN 0-89526-638-5
- For Gardens and Other Places: The Sculpture of Sylvia Shaw Judson: Henry Regnery, Chicago, 1967
