= Volo Bog State Natural Area =

State park in Illinois, USA

- IUCN category V (protected landscape/seascape)
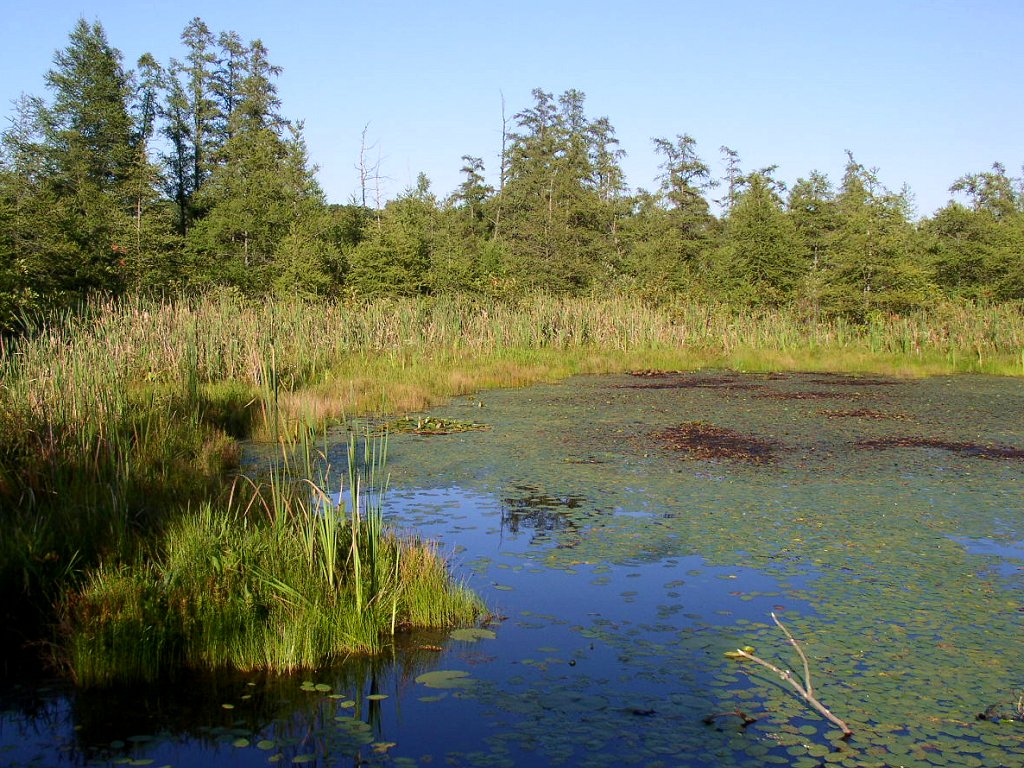
- The open-water center of Volo Bog, surrounded by tamarack trees

- Location within Illinois Location within the United States
- Location: Lake County, Illinois, USA
- Nearest city: Ingleside, Illinois
- Coordinates: 42°21′06″N 88°11′10″W
- Area: 1,150 acres (470 ha)
- Established: 1970
- Governing body: Illinois Department of Natural Resources

U.S. National Natural Landmark
- Designated: 1972

Volo Bog State Natural Area is a nature reserve in Illinois, United States, preserving Volo Bog. The bog was designated a National Natural Landmark in 1973 as the only remaining open-water quaking bog in Illinois. The site also contains woodlands, savanna, marshes, prairie restoration areas, shrubland and old fields. Maintained by the Illinois Department of Natural Resources (Illinois DNR), the site is located about a mile west of U.S. Route 12 between the towns of Volo and Fox Lake, Illinois.

== Bog biology ==
The bog itself is 47.5 acres (19.2 ha) in size. It was originally a steep-sided lake created by the melting of a large chunk of glacial ice at the end of the Wisconsonian glaciation. About 6,000 years before the present, a mat of sphagnum moss began to grow out into the water, playing a major role in the evolution of this geological feature from a lake into a bog.

As the sphagnum mat aged and thickened, the developing bog (already poorly drained) became acidic. The bog's changing pH levels encouraged the growth of other acid-loving plant species, such as leatherleaf, certain specialized orchids, and coniferous tamarack trees. The development of a tamarack grove on the edge of the bog signaled further change in the wetland.

By historic times Volo Bog was deep into the process of plant succession. While the center of the bog remained a pool of open water, shallower sections of the sphagnum-moss cushion had begun to provide a substrate for the growth of woody plants, such as tamaracks and poison sumac. The edges of the bog were further developing from a bog into a slightly drier wetland.

A state-owned protective zone around the bog displays further stages of plant succession. The entire state park displays a microcosm of plant succession, from bog, through wetland, to sedge-grass meadow.

== Bog history ==
The boardwalk trail through the tamarack zone to the bog

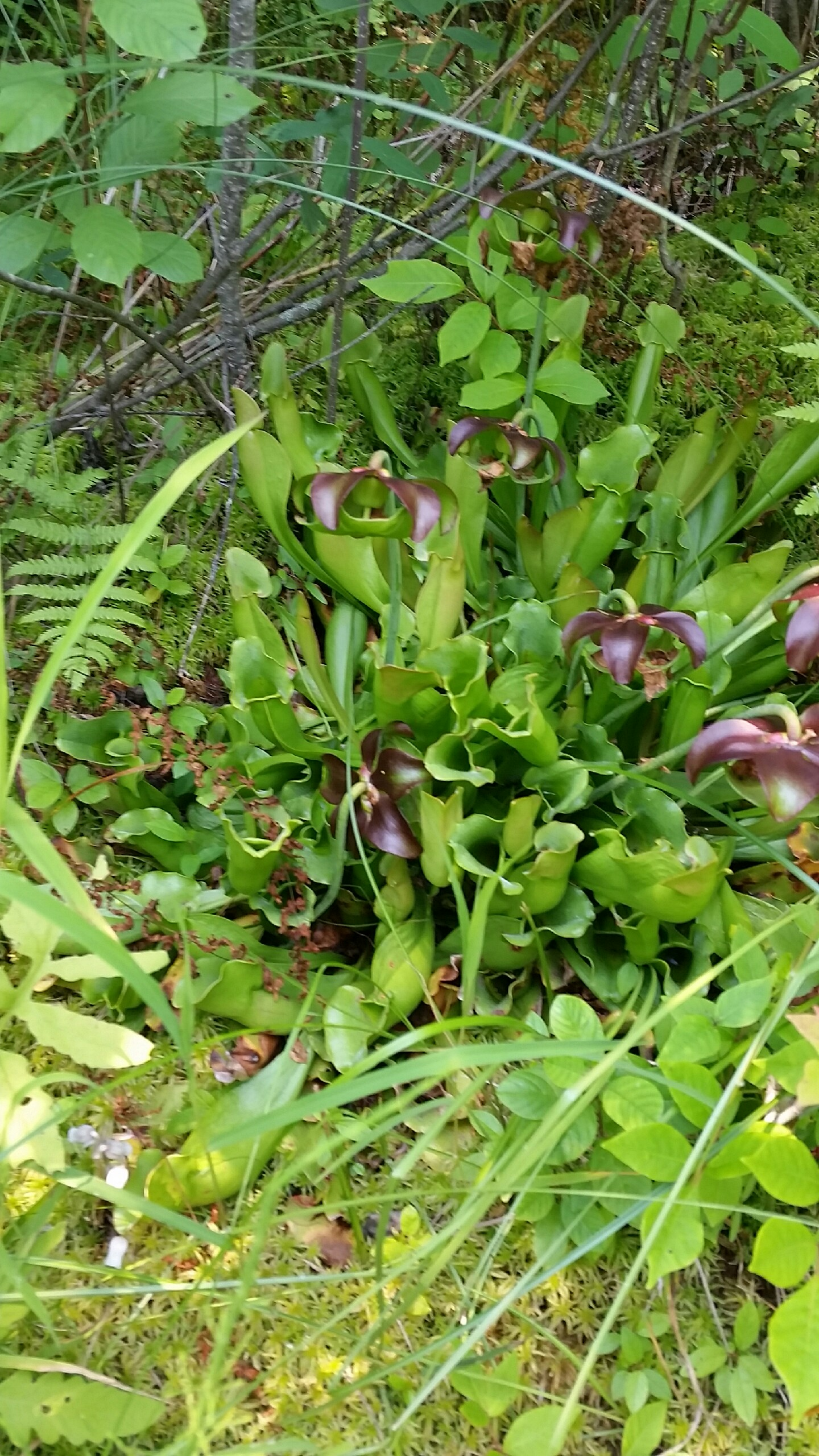
Pitcher plants visible from the boardwalk, taken July 2015

During the 19th century Volo Bog was known to neighbors but not to outsiders. While the damp meadows surrounding the bog provided pasturage for a dairy farm, the bog itself was not economically used. The first field study mentioning Volo Bog was published by W.G. Waterman of Northwestern University in 1921.

As the 20th century moved forward, population growth in the Chicago area placed Volo Bog under threat from residential development. Cyrus Mark, the first president of the Illinois chapter of The Nature Conservancy, spearheaded the efforts to purchase Volo Bog for preservation. Under Mark's leadership, the Conservancy's Illinois chapter purchased the 47.5-acre (19.2 ha) bog and donated it to the University of Illinois in 1958; this was the first land purchase made by the Illinois Nature Conservancy. The university served as the bog's custodian from 1958 until 1970.

Growth in public sensitivity toward ecological concerns in the 1960s led to fears that the bog could not survive as an isolated unit. It became clear that the wetlands and meadows surrounding the bog formed an essential element in the survival of the bog itself, as well as serving as a teaching tool for plant succession. In 1970 with widespread local public support, the University of Illinois transferred the bog to the Illinois Department of Natural Resources, and the state of Illinois began purchasing parcels of land surrounding the bog to create the current 1,150-acre (470 ha) park.

Volo Bog was listed as a National Natural Landmark in 1973. One of the wetland farm's original, circa-1900 dairy barns was renovated and reopened as the bog's visitor center in 1980.

Work since 1980 has concentrated on rebuilding and maintaining trails throughout the bog, increasing the accessibility of the bog and visitor center for persons with disabilities, and operating continuing ecology-education programs for adults and schoolchildren.

A volunteer restoration team was formed in autumn 2023.

== Recreation ==
Volo Bog State Natural Area currently offers two major trails. An elevated 0.5-mile (0.80 km) boardwalk leads from the Visitor Center into the bog itself. A 2.75-mile (4.43 km) ground trail circles through the wetlands and meadows surrounding the bog.
