= Market Square (Lake Forest, Illinois) =

Shopping center in Illinois, United States

Coordinates: 42°15′8″N 87°50′26″W

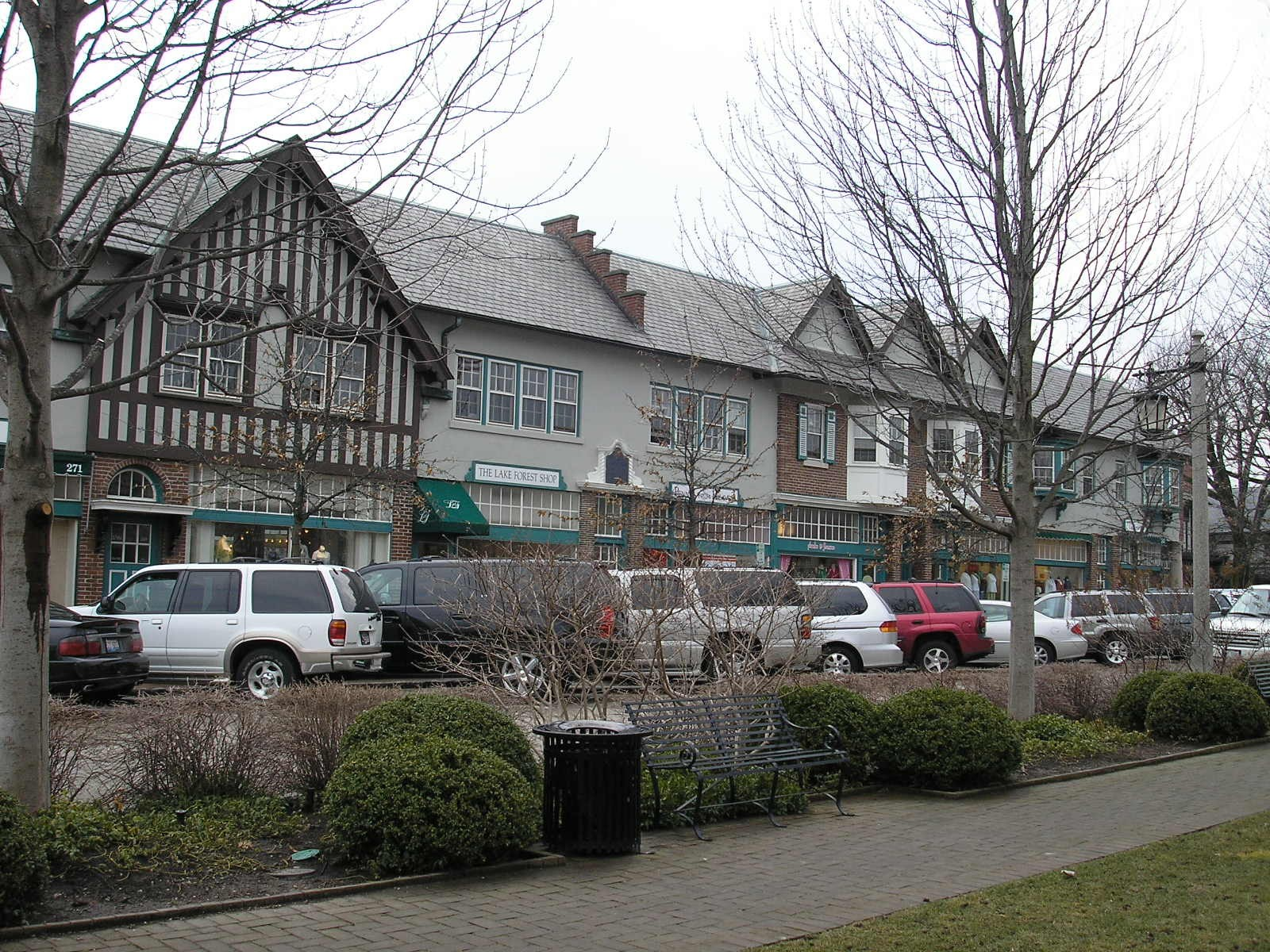
Market Square

Market Square is a 103,000-square-foot (9,600 m^{2}) neighborhood shopping center in Lake Forest, Illinois, United States, in the Chicago metropolitan area. Opened in 1916, it is often cited as the first planned shopping center in the United States, with common design and management and designated area for parking automobiles.

Although Country Club Plaza (1923) in Kansas City, Missouri is generally credited as the first suburban and the first regional shopping center designed to accommodate shoppers arriving by automobile, Market Square was first with these features, but was neither suburban nor of "regional" size (400,000 sq. ft. or larger. Market Square was built within an already defined central retail district, replacing prior development. Lake Forest resident Arthur T. Aldis championed the notion of replacing the dilapidated business district of the town, and engaged architect Howard Van Doren Shaw.

In Illinois, the first major center to be developed after Market Square was Spanish Court (1928).

In celebration of the 2018 Illinois Bicentennial, Lake Forest Market Square was selected as one of the Illinois 200 Great Places by the American Institute of Architects Illinois component (AIA Illinois).

== See also ==
- List of shopping malls in the United States
- List of largest shopping malls in the United States
