= Bird Girl =

Sculpture made famous by its appearance on a book cover

Coordinates: 32.078°N 81.095°W

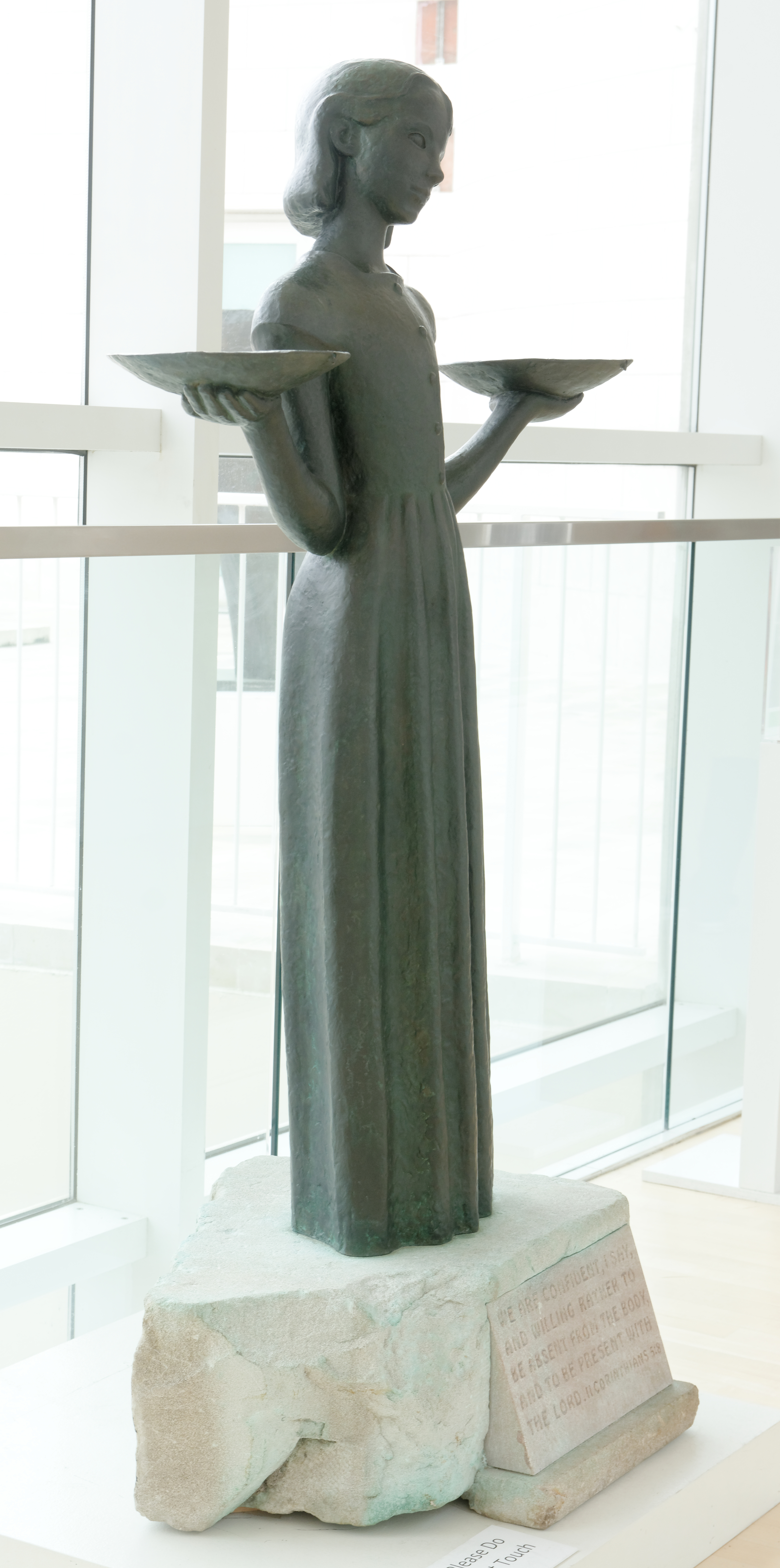
Jepson Center location

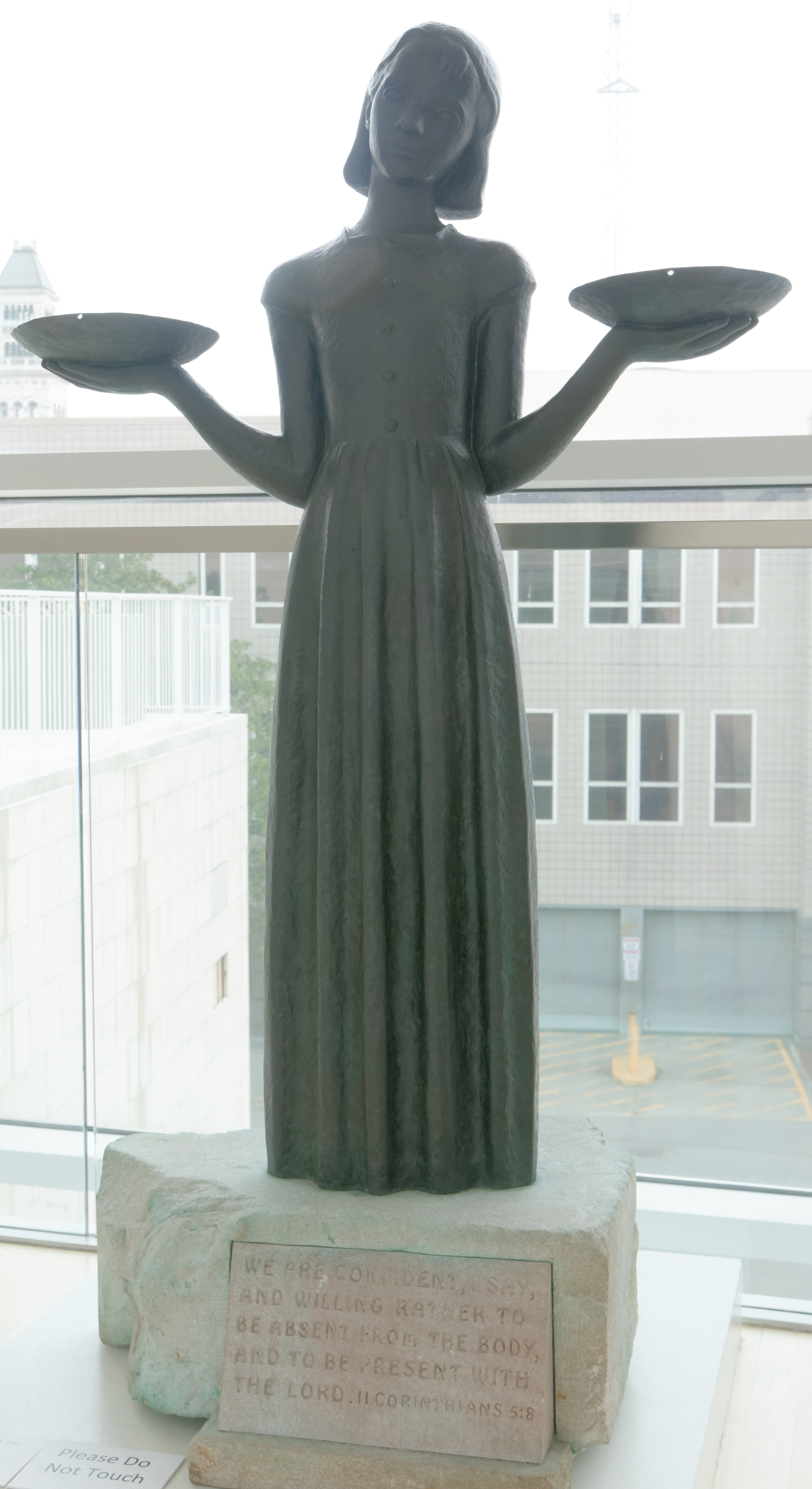
Front view

Bird Girl is a sculpture made in 1936 by Sylvia Shaw Judson in Lake Forest, Illinois. It was sculpted at Ragdale, her family's summer home, and achieved fame when it was featured on the cover of the 1994 non-fiction novel Midnight in the Garden of Good and Evil. Originally exhibited as Girl with Bowls at the Art Institute of Chicago in 1938, it was also exhibited as Fountain Figure, Standing Figure, and Peasant Girl. A 1967 book by Judson first referred to it as Bird Girl.

== Description ==
Bird Girl is cast in bronze and stands 50 inches (130 cm) tall. She is the image of a young girl wearing a simple dress with a "contemplative, gracefully tilted gaze" that "stands solid and quietly, a strong and simple form ... a serene spirit that offers us in this troubled age the tranquility we find too seldom". The work was originally commissioned as a garden sculpture for a family in Massachusetts. A slight, eight-year-old model named Lorraine Greenman (now Lorraine Ganz) posed for the piece.

She stands straight with her head tilted toward her left shoulder, her elbows propped against her waist as she holds up two bowls out from her sides. "Bird Girl's pose does not actually symbolize the weighing of good and evil, rather, the bowls in her upturned hands were intended to hold food or water for birds. She was also originally designed to potentially function as a fountain, as indicated by the small holes in the bottom of her bowls and the slots at the front for water to overflow."

The inscription on the pedestal reads: "We are confident, I say, and willing rather to be absent from the body, and to be present with the Lord. II Corinthians 5:8"

== Original casts ==
First sculpted in clay, the statue was cast six times, once in lead and five times in bronze, between 1937 and 1940 according to records from the Roman Bronze Works in New York City, but later correspondence from the sculptor mentioned only four casts. Four original bronze casts are currently known: one went to Massachusetts and is now in the Edward L. Ryerson Conservation Area in Riverwoods, IL; one went to a Washington, DC, garden and then to Reading, PA; another was bought by a Lake Forest, IL resident and is still there; and the fourth went to Savannah. (Note: The 1999 Leroux article did not mention the lead cast and quoted the sculptor's daughter on the disposition of the four known bronze casts. The Washington/Reading version was sold for $390,000 in 2021. The auction catalog detailed its provenance as the second of the four original casts and also cited the Savannah version as the fourth cast.)

The most famous version was purchased by a Savannah family who named it Little Wendy and placed it in the family's plot in Bonaventure Cemetery with an inscribed pedestal. It has since been relocated to the Telfair Academy, where it is on display for museum visitors. Judson donated the original plaster model to the Crow Island School in Winnetka, Illinois.

== Book cover ==
The Bonaventure Cemetery statue sat virtually unnoticed until 1993, when Random House hired Savannah photographer Jack Leigh to shoot an image for the cover of John Berendt's new book, Midnight in the Garden of Good and Evil. Leigh searched the Bonaventure Cemetery for a suitable subject. At the end of his second day of searching, he found the sculpture next to a grave on the Trosdal family plot and had to make the shot quickly as dusk approached. He reportedly spent ten hours in the darkroom adjusting the lighting, giving the photo a moonlit feel and accentuating the halo around the statue's head.

The cover image, titled "Midnight, Bonaventure Cemetery", was an immediate hit, and Berendt called it "one of the strongest book covers I've ever seen". The book, published in 1994, became a bestseller, and soon people began flocking to Bonaventure Cemetery to see the sculpture. Due to concern about traffic at the grave site, the Trosdal family removed it from the cemetery and lent it to the Telfair Museums in Savannah in 1997 for public display. In December 2014, the statue was moved to the Telfair Academy where, as of 2025, she resides in a special exhibit.

== Additional casts ==
In 1995, Judson's daughter Alice Judson Hayes (aka Alice Ryerson Hayes) had an additional bronze statue created from a mold and gave it to the Ragdale Foundation, an artist residency program in Lake Forest. Later, an authorized plaster replica was made from the original plaster model for use by Macy's in their display windows; it was later moved to Jack Leigh's studio and then to the Savannah History Museum.

Hayes holds the copyright for the Bird Girl and has actively defended it by filing lawsuits against unauthorized reproductions, especially full-sized replicas. She destroyed the mold that was used to cast the 1995 replica, although the original plaster model still exists. Hayes has licensed smaller-scale replicas, which have sold well. She died on October 13, 2006, passing on the copyright to her daughter, painter Francie Shaw.

== Film use ==
Warner Bros. produced a film adaptation of Berendt's book in 1997, directed by Clint Eastwood and featuring Kevin Spacey and John Cusack. After purchasing the rights to use the sculpture's likeness from Hayes, the studio created a fiberglass replica. The movie incorporated shots of the Bird Girl sculpture on its posters and in the film itself. After the film was completed, the replica was sent to the Cliff Dwellers Club in Chicago, Illinois.

Photographer Leigh sued Warner Bros. in November 1997 for copyright infringement over their shots of the Bird Girl replica in the cemetery, which were similar to Leigh's original cover photograph. The lower court ruled that the Warner sequences with the statue were not infringement, but an appeals court found that the photographs used for promotional purposes, such as posters, bore significant similarities and remanded the matter back to the lower court. Warner and Leigh then settled out of court for an undisclosed amount.

== Deaths ==
Sylvia Shaw Judson died in 1978. Although she did not see her Bird Girl sculpture achieve fame, she was already a renowned sculptor whose pieces have been on display in such prestigious locations as the White House, the Massachusetts State House, the Philadelphia Museum of Art, and the Whitney Museum of American Art in New York City.

Jack Leigh died of colon cancer on May 19, 2004, and is buried in Bonaventure Cemetery, where he took his most famous photograph.
