= Marktown =

- Marktown Historic District
- U.S. National Register of Historic Places
- U.S. Historic district
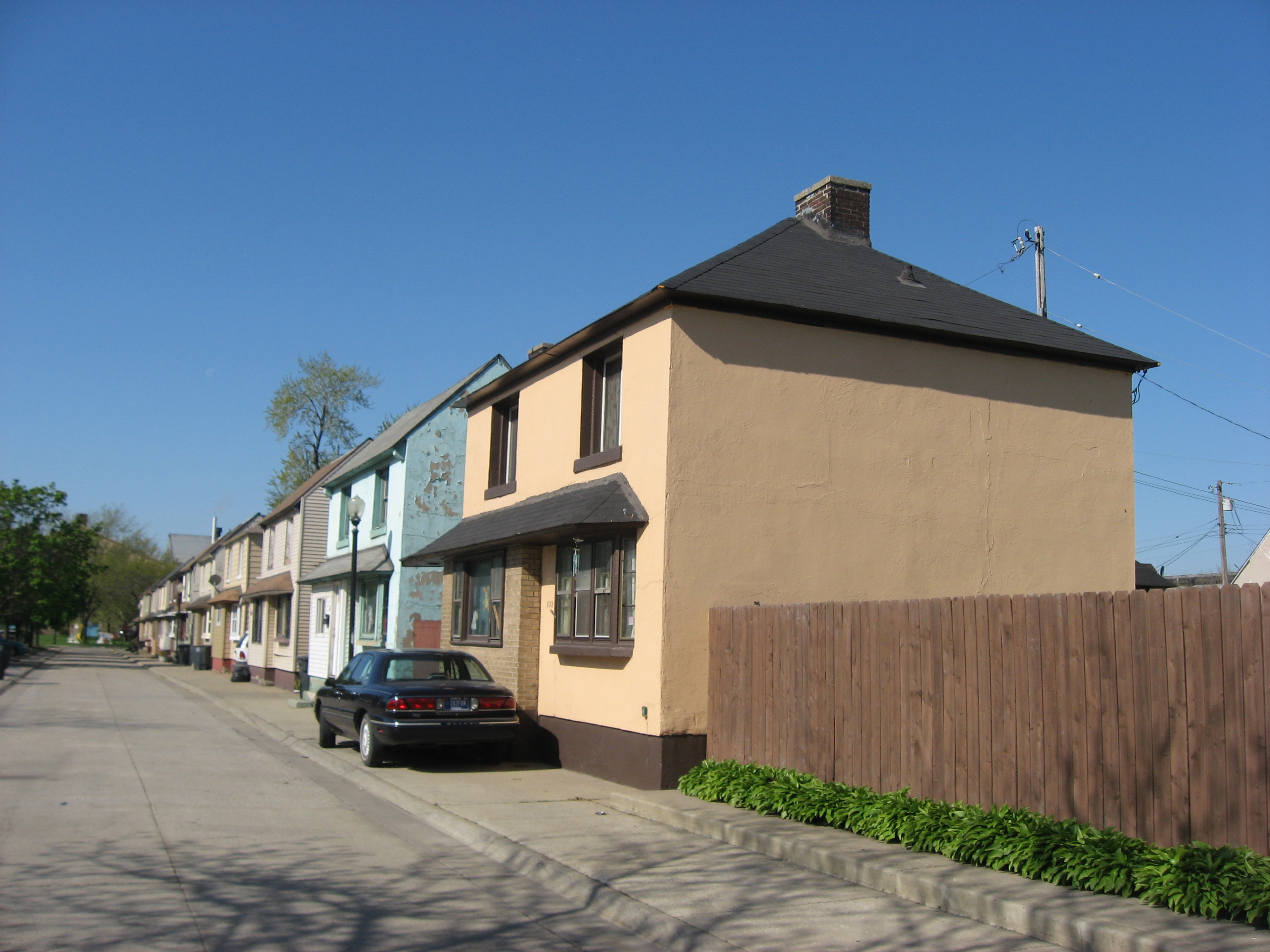
- Houses on Park Street

- Location within Indiana Location within the United States
- Location: Bounded by Pine, Riley, Dickey, and 129th Sts., East Chicago, Indiana
- Coordinates: 41°39′32″N 87°28′4″W
- Area: 40 acres (16 ha)
- Built: 1917
- Architect: Howard Van Doren Shaw
- NRHP reference No.: 75000025
- Added to NRHP: February 20, 1975

Marktown is an urban planned worker community in East Chicago, Indiana, United States, built during the Progressive Era in 1917 from marshland to provide a complete community for workers at The Mark Manufacturing Company.

The Marktown Historic District was added to the National Register of Historic Places in 1975.

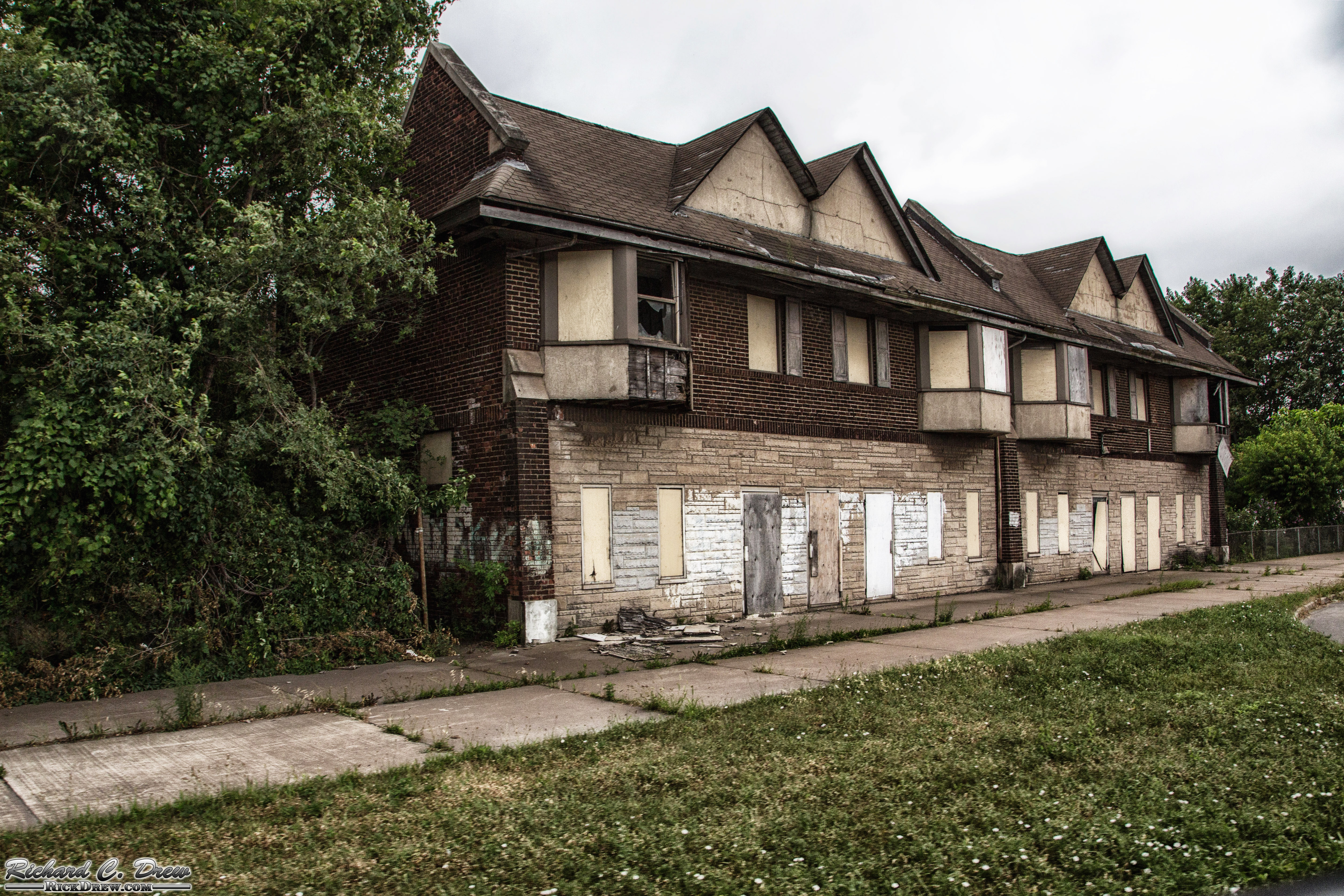
Retail on the bottom, apartments on top. Abandoned since the 1980s.

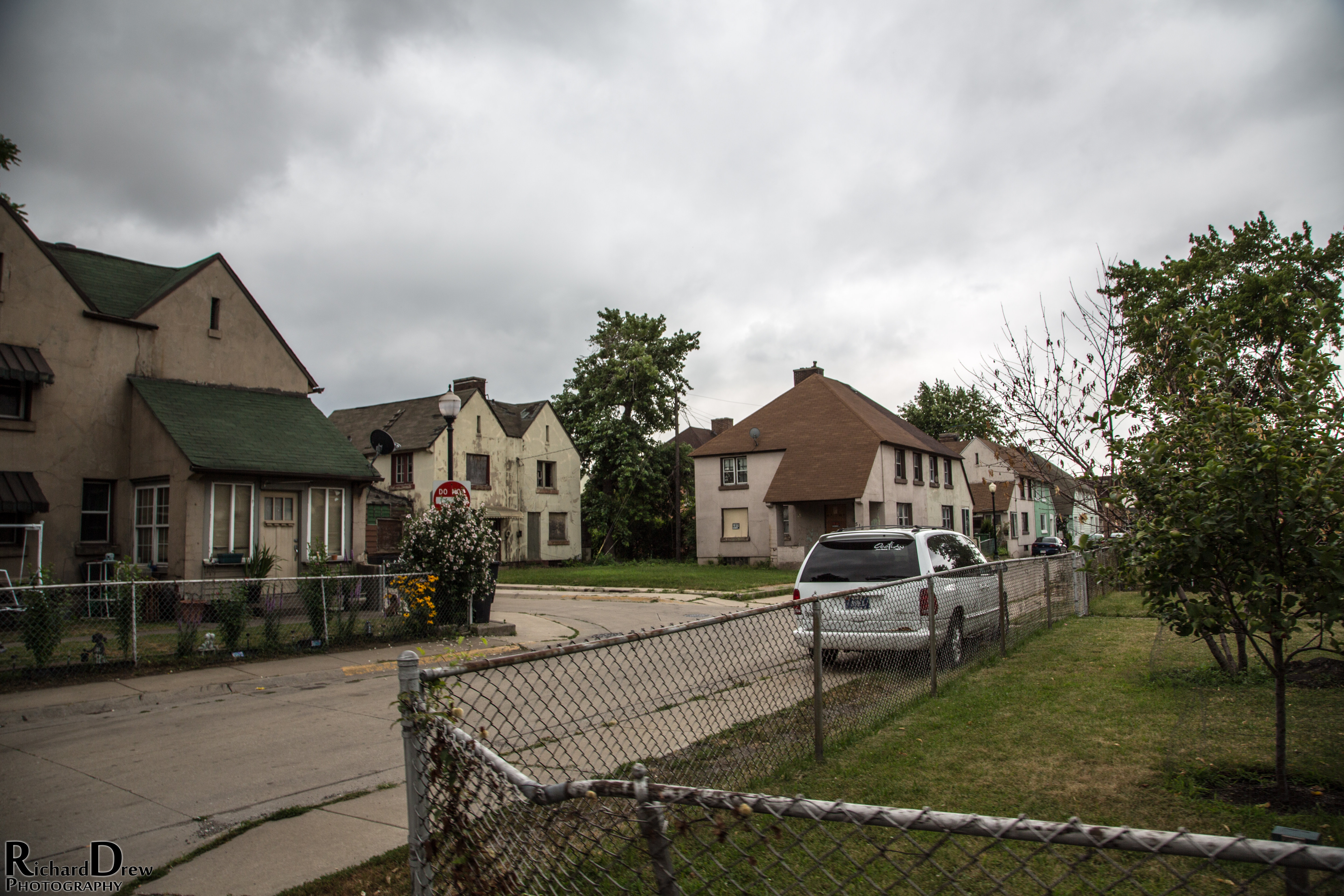
Abandoned houses and duplexes side by side with occupied.

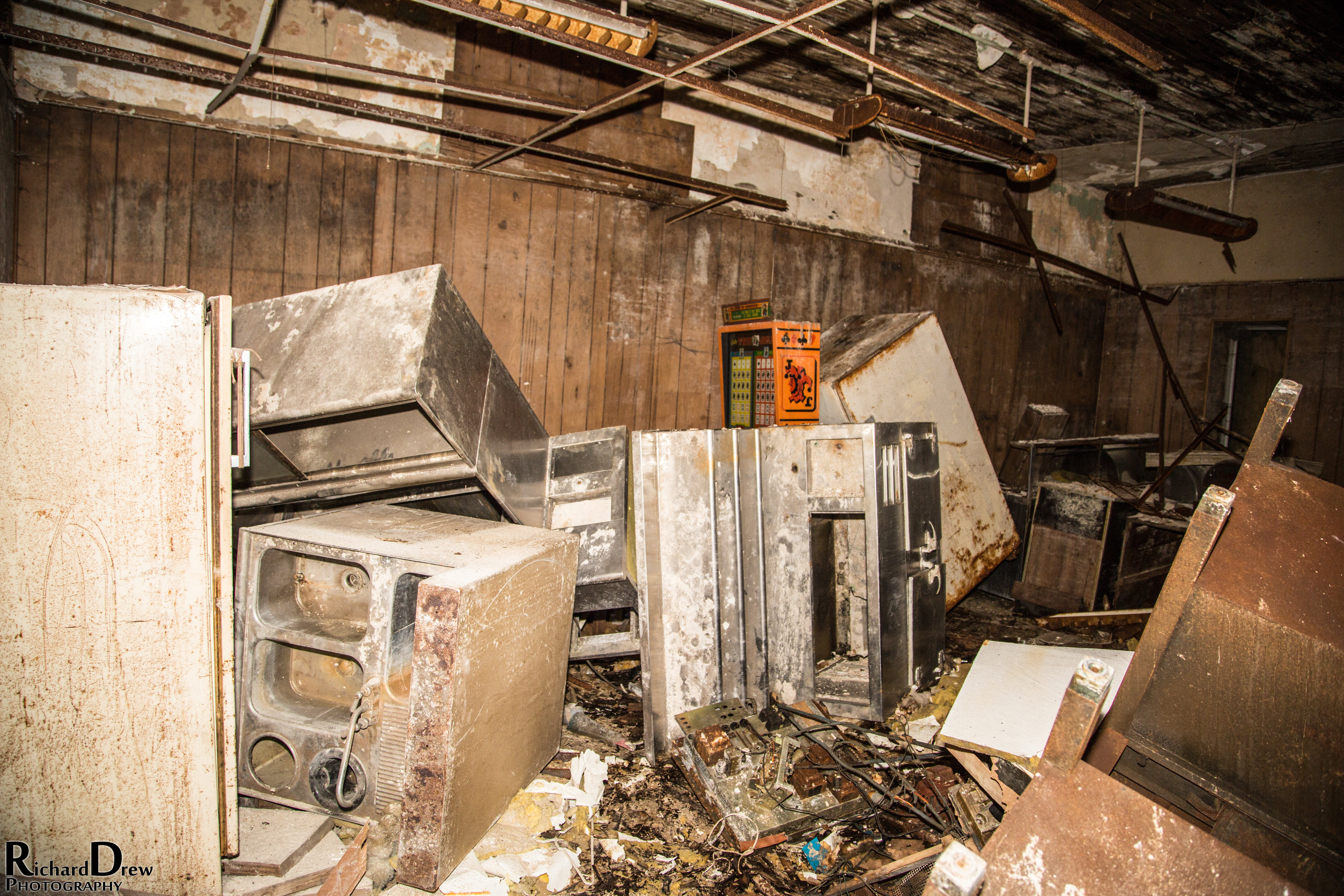
Retail on the bottom, apartments on top. Abandoned since the 1980s.

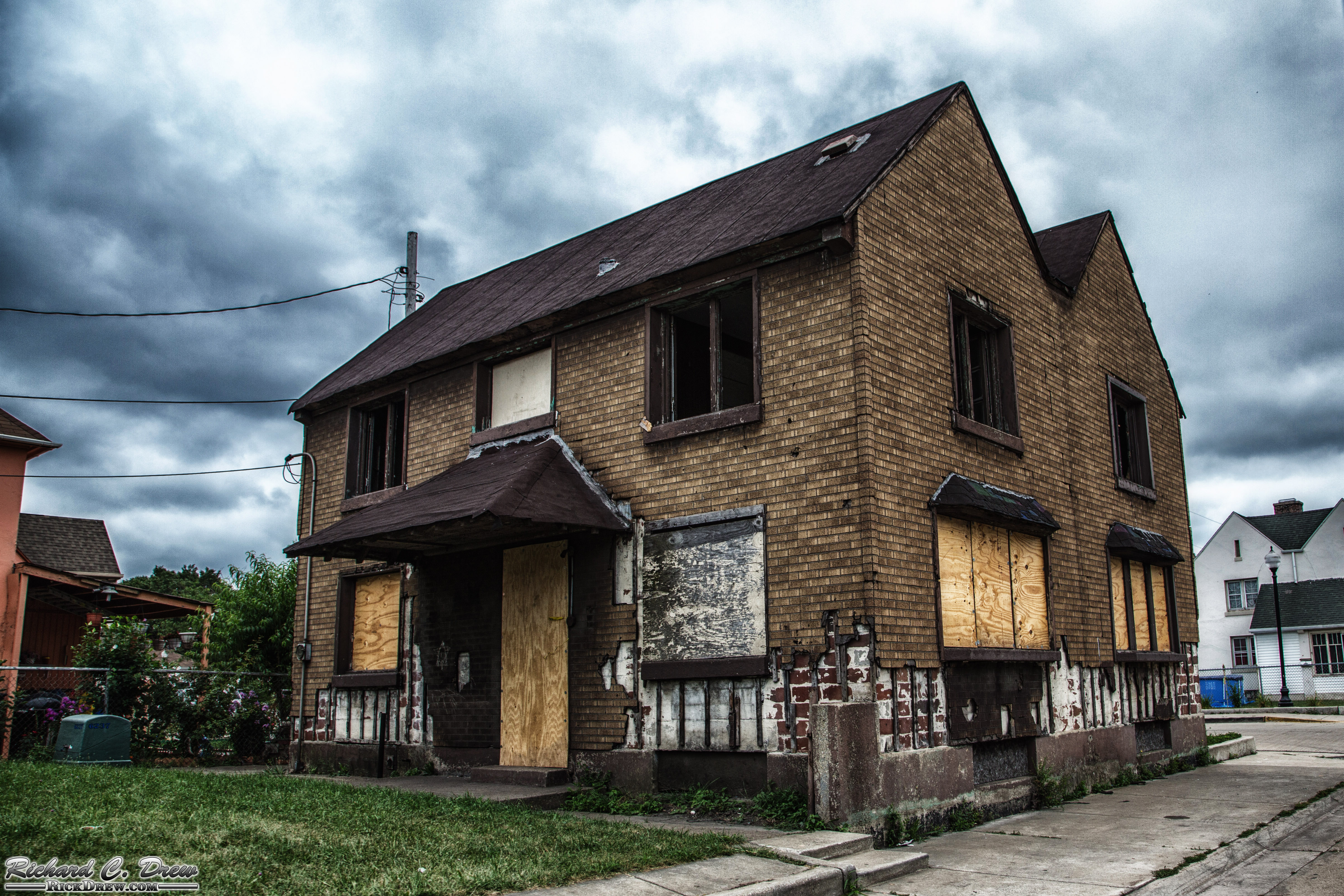
Abandoned duplex in Marktown

== History ==
The community of Marktown was founded by Clayton Mark, a pioneer maker of steel in the United States. The renowned architect hired to design the community, Howard Van Doren Shaw, created a unique design in which the streets serve as walkways and the cars are parked on the sidewalks, as noted in Ripley's Believe It or Not!. Shaw previously designed Mark's estate in Lake Forest, Illinois.

Only 10% of the original design was built, as the building of the community was terminated due to the aftereffects of World War I and the sale of the Mark Manufacturing Company. The industries in East Chicago expanded to the borders of Marktown, surrounding the historic residential island with one of the densest industrial complexes in the world. It was added to the National Register of Historic Places in 1975, and was listed as one of the seven wonders of Northwest Indiana.

Marktown is regarded as an important cultural resource of architectural and historical significance. In the words of the Marktown Revitalization Plan commissioned by the city of East Chicago in 2008, "Marktown is significant as it is a major work by a significant American architect, Howard Van Doren Shaw, for its association with the driving economic force of industry that served as an identity of the region, and is representative of the planned industrial community movement of the late 19th and early 20th century."

As late as 2011, all of the originally constructed homes in Marktown still stood. However, since then some properties have been bought by BP and demolished. The homes are being evacuated due to air pollution and concerns regarding safety in the vicinity of the expanding crude tar sands processing facility.

In 2022, East Chicago began a Marktown Neighborhood Housing Study to consider renovations of the historical district.
