= Illinois's 10th congressional district =

U.S. House district for Illinois

Coordinates: 42°16′47″N 87°56′21″W

- Interactive map of district boundaries since January 3, 2023
- Representative: Brad Schneider; D–Highland Park
- Area: 536.3 mi^{2} (1,389 km^{2})
- Distribution: 99.7% urban; 0.3% rural
- Population (2025): 757,647
- Median household income: $103,989
- Ethnicity: 57.9% White; 24.0% Hispanic; 8.0% Asian; 6.3% Black; 3.2% Two or more races; 0.6% other
- Cook PVI: D+12

The 10th congressional district of Illinois lies in the northeast corner of the state and mostly comprises northern suburbs of Chicago. It was created after the 1860 census. The district is currently represented by Democrat Brad Schneider.

The area of the district was originally represented by one of Abraham Lincoln's closest allies, Elihu B. Washburne (R-Waukegan). The district was created in 1982 redistricting out of districts represented by John Porter (R-Wilmette) and Robert McClory (R-Lake Bluff). On the retirement of McClory, the district was represented by Porter after winning the elections of 1982, 1984, 1986, 1988, 1990, 1992, 1994, 1996, and 1998. Following Porter's retirement, 11 Republicans and two Democrats ran to succeed him. Eventually nine Republicans and one Democrat stood for election in the primary of March 2000. John Porter's former Chief of Staff, Mark Kirk, won the Republican primary over number two rival Shaun Donnely. Kirk then defeated State Representative Lauren Beth Gash (D-Highland Park) by 2% in the 2000 general election. Kirk remained in Congress until he decided to run for the United States Senate in the 2010 election. He was succeeded by Republican Robert Dold.

The 10th is home to several Fortune 500 companies, including, but not limited to: CDW, Walgreens, Underwriters Laboratories, Baxter Healthcare, AbbVie, Allstate Insurance, and Mondelez International. The Naval Station Great Lakes near North Chicago, hosting the United States Navy's only boot camp, trains 38,000 recruits each year. 5.2% of the district's inhabitants have performed military service.

== History ==
=== 2011 redistricting ===
The district covers parts of Cook and Lake counties, as of the 2011 redistricting which followed the 2010 census. All or parts of Beach Park, Buffalo Grove, Deerfield, Fox Lake, Glencoe, Grayslake, Highland Park, Lake Bluff, Lake Forest, Lake Villa, Lindenhurst, Libertyville, Morton Grove, Mundelein, North Chicago, Northbrook, Prospect Heights, Round Lake, Round Lake Beach, Vernon Hills, Waukegan, Wheeling, and Zion are included. The boundaries became effective on January 3, 2013.

== Composition ==
For the 118th and successive Congresses (based on redistricting following the 2020 census), the district contains all or portions of the following counties, townships, and municipalities:

Cook County (14)

Buffalo Grove (part, also 9th; shared with Lake County), Deerfield (part, shared with Lake County), Glencoe (part, also 5th and 9th), Glenview (part, also 9th), Kenilworth, New Trier Township (part, also 9th), Northbrook (part, also 9th), Northfield (part, also 9th), Northfield Township (part, also 5th and 9th), Prospect Heights (part, also 9th), Wheeling (part, also 9th), Wheeling Township (part, also 5th and 9th), Wilmette (part, also 9th), Winnetka

Lake County (53)

Antioch, Antioch Township, Avon Township, Bannockburn, Beach Park, Benton Township, Buffalo Grove (part, also 9th; shared with Lake County), Deerfield (part, shared with Cook County), Fox Lake (part, also McHenry County), Fremont Township (part, also 9th and 11th), Grant Township (part, also 11th; includes part of Long Lake), Grayslake, Green Oaks, Gurnee, Hainesville, Hawthorn Woods (part, also 9th), Highland Park, Highwood, Indian Creek, Lake Bluff, Lake Forest, Lake Villa, Lake Villa Township, Libertyville, Libertyville Township, Lincolnshire, Lindenhurst, Long Grove (part, also 5th and 9th), Mettawa, Moraine Township, Mundelein, Newport Township, North Chicago, Old Mill Creek, Park City, Riverwoods, Round Lake, Round Lake Beach, Round Lake Heights, Round Lake Park, Shields Township, Third Lake, Vernon Hills, Vernon Township (part, also 5th and 9th), Volo (part, also 11th), Wadsworth, Warren Township, Waukegan, Waukegan Township, West Deerfield Township, Winthrop Harbor, Zion, Zion Township

McHenry County (15)

Fox Lake (part, shared with Lake County), Greenwood, Greenwood Township (part, also 11th), Hebron, Hebron Township, Johnsburg, Lakemoor (part, also 11th; shared with Lake County), McCullom Lake (part, also 11th), McHenry (part, also 11th), McHenry Township (part, also 11th; includes Pistakee Highlands), Richmond, Richmond Township, Ringwood, Spring Grove, Wonder Lake

== Recent election results from statewide races ==
| Year | Office | Results |
|---|---|---|
| 2008 | President | Obama 60% - 38% |
| 2012 | President | Obama 55% - 45% |
| 2016 | President | Clinton 58% - 35% |
| 2016 | Senate | Duckworth 51% - 45% |
| 2016 | Comptroller (Spec.) | Munger 49% - 46% |
| 2018 | Governor | Pritzker 52% - 43% |
| 2018 | Attorney General | Raoul 55% - 43% |
| 2018 | Secretary of State | White 69% - 29% |
| 2018 | Comptroller | Mendoza 59% - 38% |
| 2018 | Treasurer | Frerichs 56% - 41% |
| 2020 | President | Biden 62% - 36% |
| 2020 | Senate | Durbin 57% - 38% |
| 2022 | Senate | Duckworth 61% - 37% |
| 2022 | Governor | Pritzker 61% - 36% |
| 2022 | Attorney General | Raoul 60% - 38% |
| 2022 | Secretary of State | Giannoulias 60% - 38% |
| 2022 | Comptroller | Mendoza 61% - 37% |
| 2022 | Treasurer | Frerichs 59% - 39% |
| 2024 | President | Harris 60% - 38% |

== List of members representing the district ==
| Member | Party | Years | Cong ress | Electoral history | District location |
|---|---|---|---|---|---|
District created March 4, 1863
| Anthony L. Knapp (Jerseyville) | Democratic | March 4, 1863 – March 3, 1865 | 38th | Redistricted from the 6th district and re-elected in 1862. Retired. | |
| Anthony Thornton (Shelbyville) | Democratic | March 4, 1865 – March 3, 1867 | 39th | Elected in 1864. Retired. | |
| Albert G. Burr (Carrollton) | Democratic | March 4, 1867 – March 3, 1871 | 40th 41st | Elected in 1866. Re-elected in 1868. Retired. | |
| Edward Y. Rice (Hillsboro) | Democratic | March 4, 1871 – March 3, 1873 | 42nd | Elected in 1870. Lost renomination. | |
| William H. Ray (Rushville) | Republican | March 4, 1873 – March 3, 1875 | 43rd | Elected in 1872. Retired. | |
| John C. Bagby (Rushville) | Democratic | March 4, 1875 – March 3, 1877 | 44th | Elected in 1874. Retired. | |
| Benjamin F. Marsh (Warsaw) | Republican | March 4, 1877 – March 3, 1883 | 45th 46th 47th | Elected in 1876. Re-elected in 1878. Re-elected in 1880. Redistricted to the 11th district. | |
| Nicholas E. Worthington (Peoria) | Democratic | March 4, 1883 – March 3, 1887 | 48th 49th | Elected in 1882. Re-elected in 1884. Lost re-election. | |
| Philip S. Post (Galesburg) | Republican | March 4, 1887 – January 6, 1895 | 50th 51st 52nd 53rd 54th | Elected in 1886. Re-elected in 1888. Re-elected in 1890. Re-elected in 1892. Re-elected in 1894. Died. | |
| Vacant | | January 6, 1895 – December 2, 1895 | 54th | | |
| George W. Prince (Galesburg) | Republican | December 2, 1895 – March 3, 1903 | 54th 55th 56th 57th | Elected to finish Post's term. Re-elected in 1896. Re-elected in 1898. Re-elected in 1900. Redistricted to the 15th district. | |
| George E. Foss (Chicago) | Republican | March 4, 1903 – March 3, 1913 | 58th 59th 60th 61st 62nd | Redistricted from the 7th district and re-elected in 1902. Re-elected in 1904. Re-elected in 1906. Re-elected in 1908. Re-elected in 1910. Lost re-election. | |
| Charles M. Thomson (Chicago) | Progressive | March 4, 1913 – March 3, 1915 | 63rd | Elected in 1912. Lost re-election. | |
| George E. Foss (Chicago) | Republican | March 4, 1915 – March 3, 1919 | 64th 65th | Elected in 1914. Re-elected in 1916. Retired to run for U.S. Senator. | |
| Carl R. Chindblom (Evanston) | Republican | March 4, 1919 – March 3, 1933 | 66th 67th 68th 69th 70th 71st 72nd | Elected in 1918. Re-elected in 1920. Re-elected in 1922. Re-elected in 1924. Re-elected in 1926. Re-elected in 1928. Re-elected in 1930. Lost renomination. | |
| James Simpson Jr. (Wadsworth) | Republican | March 4, 1933 – January 3, 1935 | 73rd | Elected in 1932. Lost renomination. | |
| Ralph E. Church (Evanston) | Republican | January 3, 1935 – January 3, 1941 | 74th 75th 76th | Elected in 1934. Re-elected in 1936. Re-elected in 1938. Retired to run for U.S. Senator. | |
| George A. Paddock (Evanston) | Republican | January 3, 1941 – January 3, 1943 | 77th | Elected in 1940. Lost renomination. | |
| Ralph E. Church (Evanston) | Republican | January 3, 1943 – January 3, 1949 | 78th 79th 80th | Elected in 1942. Re-elected in 1944. Re-elected in 1946. Redistricted to the 13th district. | |
| Richard W. Hoffman (Riverside) | Republican | January 3, 1949 – January 3, 1957 | 81st 82nd 83rd 84th | Elected in 1948. Re-elected in 1950. Re-elected in 1952. Re-elected in 1954. Retired. | |
| Harold R. Collier (Western Springs) | Republican | January 3, 1957 – January 3, 1973 | 85th 86th 87th 88th 89th 90th 91st 92nd | Elected in 1956. Re-elected in 1958. Re-elected in 1960. Re-elected in 1962. Re-elected in 1964. Re-elected in 1966. Re-elected in 1968. Re-elected in 1970. Redistricted to the 6th district. | |
| Samuel H. Young (Glenview) | Republican | January 3, 1973 – January 3, 1975 | 93rd | Elected in 1972. Lost re-election. | |
| Abner Mikva (Evanston) | Democratic | January 3, 1975 – September 26, 1979 | 94th 95th 96th | Elected in 1974. Re-elected in 1976. Re-elected in 1978. Resigned to become judge of U.S. Court of Appeals. | |
| Vacant | | September 26, 1979 – January 22, 1980 | 96th | | |
| John Edward Porter (Wilmette) | Republican | January 22, 1980 – January 3, 2001 | 96th 97th 98th 99th 100th 101st 102nd 103rd 104th 105th 106th | Elected to finish Mikva's term. Re-elected in 1980. Re-elected in 1982. Re-elected in 1984. Re-elected in 1986. Re-elected in 1988. Re-elected in 1990. Re-elected in 1992. Re-elected in 1994. Re-elected in 1996. Re-elected in 1998. Retired. | |
| Mark Kirk (Highland Park) | Republican | January 3, 2001 – November 29, 2010 | 107th 108th 109th 110th 111th | Elected in 2000. Re-elected in 2002. Re-elected in 2004. Re-elected in 2006. Re-elected in 2008. Retired to run for U.S. senator, and then resigned when elected. | |
| Mark Kirk (Highland Park) | Republican | January 3, 2001 – November 29, 2010 | 107th 108th 109th 110th 111th | Elected in 2000. Re-elected in 2002. Re-elected in 2004. Re-elected in 2006. Re-elected in 2008. Retired to run for U.S. senator, and then resigned when elected. | 2003–2013 |
| Vacant | | November 29, 2010 – January 3, 2011 | 111th | | 2003–2013 |
| Bob Dold (Kenilworth) | Republican | January 3, 2011 – January 3, 2013 | 112th | Elected in 2010. Lost re-election. | 2003–2013 |
| Brad Schneider (Deerfield) | Democratic | January 3, 2013 – January 3, 2015 | 113th | Elected in 2012. Lost re-election. | 2013–2023 |
| Bob Dold (Kenilworth) | Republican | January 3, 2015 – January 3, 2017 | 114th | Elected in 2014. Lost re-election. | 2013–2023 |
| Brad Schneider (Highland Park) | Democratic | January 3, 2017 – present | 115th 116th 117th 118th 119th | Elected in 2016. Re-elected in 2018. Re-elected in 2020. Re-elected in 2022. Re-elected in 2024. Re-elected in 2026. | 2013–2023 |
| Brad Schneider (Highland Park) | Democratic | January 3, 2017 – present | 115th 116th 117th 118th 119th | Elected in 2016. Re-elected in 2018. Re-elected in 2020. Re-elected in 2022. Re-elected in 2024. Re-elected in 2026. | 2023–present |

== Recent election results ==
| Year | Republican candidate | Republican percentage | Democratic candidate | Democratic percentage |
|---|---|---|---|---|
| 2000 | Kirk | 51 | Gash | 49 |
| 2002 | Kirk | 69 | Perritt | 31 |
| 2004 | Kirk | 65 | Goodman | 35 |
| 2006 | Kirk | 53 | Seals | 47 |
| 2008 | Kirk | 53 | Seals | 47 |
| 2010 | Dold | 51 | Seals | 49 |
| 2012 | Dold | 49 | Schneider | 51 |
| 2014 | Dold | 51 | Schneider | 49 |
| 2016 | Dold | 47 | Schneider | 53 |
| 2018 | Bennett | 34 | Schneider | 66 |
| 2020 | Mukherjee | 36 | Schneider | 64 |

=== 2006 ===
Republican candidate for Governor, Judy Baar Topinka, and GOP candidate for Cook County Board President Tony Peraica both handily won the district in 2006, although both lost in the state- and countywide (respectively) count.

2006 Illinois's 10th congressional district election
| Party | Candidate | Votes | % |
|---|---|---|---|
| Republican | Mark Kirk (incumbent) | 107,929 | 53.38 |
| Democratic | Dan Seals | 94,278 | 46.62 |
| Total votes | | 202,207 | 100.00 |
| Republican hold | | | |

=== 2008 ===
Dan Seals, who had previously run against Mark Kirk in 2006, defeated Clinton Advisor Jay Footlik for the 2008 Democratic nomination. Dave Kalbfleisch received the Green Party nomination, but was removed from the ballot by the Illinois State Board of Elections. Independent candidate Allan Stevo was also nominated. Mark Kirk defeated Dan Seals in their rematch from 2006 by 54% to 46%, thus winning a fifth term in the House.

Illinois's 10th congressional district election, 2008
| Party | Candidate | Votes | % |
|---|---|---|---|
| Republican | Mark Kirk (incumbent) | 153,082 | 52.56 |
| Democratic | Dan Seals | 138,176 | 47.44 |
| Total votes | | 291,258 | 100.00 |
| Republican hold | | | |

=== 2010 ===
The Republican Party nominee, Robert Dold, won against the Democratic Party nominee, Dan Seals.

Illinois's 10th district general election, November 2, 2010
| Party | Candidate | Votes | % |
|---|---|---|---|
| Republican | Bob Dold | 109,941 | 51.08 |
| Democratic | Dan Seals | 105,290 | 48.92 |
| Write-In | Author C. Brumfield | 1 | 0.00 |
| Total votes | | 215,232 | 100.00 |
| Republican hold | | | |

=== 2012 ===
Robert Dold no longer lives in the redrawn district, but said he would move into the district if he won re-election.

Candidates for the Democratic nomination were: Ilya Sheyman, a community organizer from Waukegan, Brad Schneider, a business consultant, John Tree, a business executive and Colonel in the Air Force Reserve, and Vivek Bavda, an intellectual property attorney.

In the March 20, 2012, primary, Brad Schneider won the Democratic nomination. Schneider defeated Dold in the general election in November.

Illinois's 10th congressional district, 2012
| Party | Candidate | Votes | % |
|---|---|---|---|
| Democratic | Brad Schneider | 133,890 | 50.6 |
| Republican | Bob Dold (incumbent) | 130,564 | 49.4 |
| Total votes | | 264,454 | 100.0 |
| Democratic gain from Republican | | | |

=== 2014 ===
Brad Schneider, the incumbent, was selected to be the Democratic nominee, and Robert Dold was once again selected to be the Republican nominee. Dold won the election with just over 50% of the vote.

Illinois's 10th congressional district, 2014
| Party | Candidate | Votes | % |
|---|---|---|---|
| Republican | Bob Dold | 95,992 | 51.3 |
| Democratic | Brad Schneider (incumbent) | 91,136 | 48.7 |
| Total votes | | 187,128 | 100.0 |
| Republican gain from Democratic | | | |

=== 2016 ===
Brad Schneider defeated Highland Park Mayor Nancy Rotering for the Democratic nomination on March 15. Democrat Brad Schneider defeated Republican Robert Dold by nearly 5% (14,000 votes), the largest victory margin in Illinois's 10th Congressional district since redistricting.

Illinois's 10th congressional district, 2016
| Party | Candidate | Votes | % |
|---|---|---|---|
| Democratic | Brad Schneider | 150,435 | 52.6 |
| Republican | Bob Dold (incumbent) | 135,535 | 47.4 |
| Independent | Joseph William Kopsick (write-in) | 26 | 0.0 |
| Total votes | | 285,996 | 100.0 |
| Democratic gain from Republican | | | |

=== 2018 ===
Brad Schneider, the incumbent, defeated his republican challenger Douglas R. Bennett with 65.6% of the vote. There were three Republican candidates who ran in the primary: Bennett of Deerfield, who is a computer consultant and vice chairman of the West Deerfield Township Republican Organization, Libertyville physician and business owner Sapan Shah, and Jeremy Wynes of Highland Park.

Robert Dold declined to run for a fifth time.

On March 20, Douglas Bennett narrowly beat Wynes and Shah in the primary.

Illinois's 10th congressional district, 2018
| Party | Candidate | Votes | % |
|---|---|---|---|
| Democratic | Brad Schneider (incumbent) | 156,540 | 65.6 |
| Republican | Douglas Bennett | 82,124 | 34.4 |
| Total votes | | 238,664 | 100.0 |
| Democratic hold | | | |

=== 2020 ===
Incumbent representative Brad Schneider faced two Democratic primary challengers in 2020. Progressive activist Andrew Wang was the first to announce a challenge to Schneider, followed shortly by fellow progressive Adam Broad. After Wang dropped out and threw his support to Broad, Broad fell short of qualifying for the ballot and mounted a write-in campaign. Broad ultimately received less than 1% of the primary vote.

In the general election, which was held on November 3, 2020, Schneider defeated Republican challenger Valerie Ramirez Mukherjee, earning nearly two-thirds of the vote.

Illinois's 10th congressional district, 2020
| Party | Candidate | Votes | % | ±% |
|---|---|---|---|---|
| Democratic | Brad Schneider (incumbent) | 202,402 | 63.87 | −1.72% |
| Republican | Valerie Ramirez Mukherjee | 114,442 | 36.12 | +1.71% |
| Write-in | | 30 | 0.01 | N/A |
| Total votes | | 316,874 | 100.0 | |
| Democratic hold | | | | |

=== 2022 ===
Illinois's 10th congressional district, 2022
| Party | Candidate | Votes | % |
|---|---|---|---|
| Democratic | Brad Schneider (incumbent) | 152,566 | 63.00 |
| Republican | Joseph Severino | 89,599 | 37.00 |
| Total votes | | 242,165 | 100.0 |
| Democratic hold | | | |

=== 2024 ===
Illinois's 10th congressional district, 2024
| Party | Candidate | Votes | % | ±% |
|---|---|---|---|---|
| Democratic | Brad Schneider (incumbent) | 196,358 | 59.93 | −3.07% |
| Republican | Jim Carris | 131,025 | 39.99 | +2.99% |
| Write-in | | 238 | 0.08 | N/A |
| Total votes | | 327,621 | 100.0 | |
| Democratic hold | | | | |

== See also ==
- Illinois's congressional districts
- List of United States congressional districts
