= Sam Yingling =

American politician (born 1980)

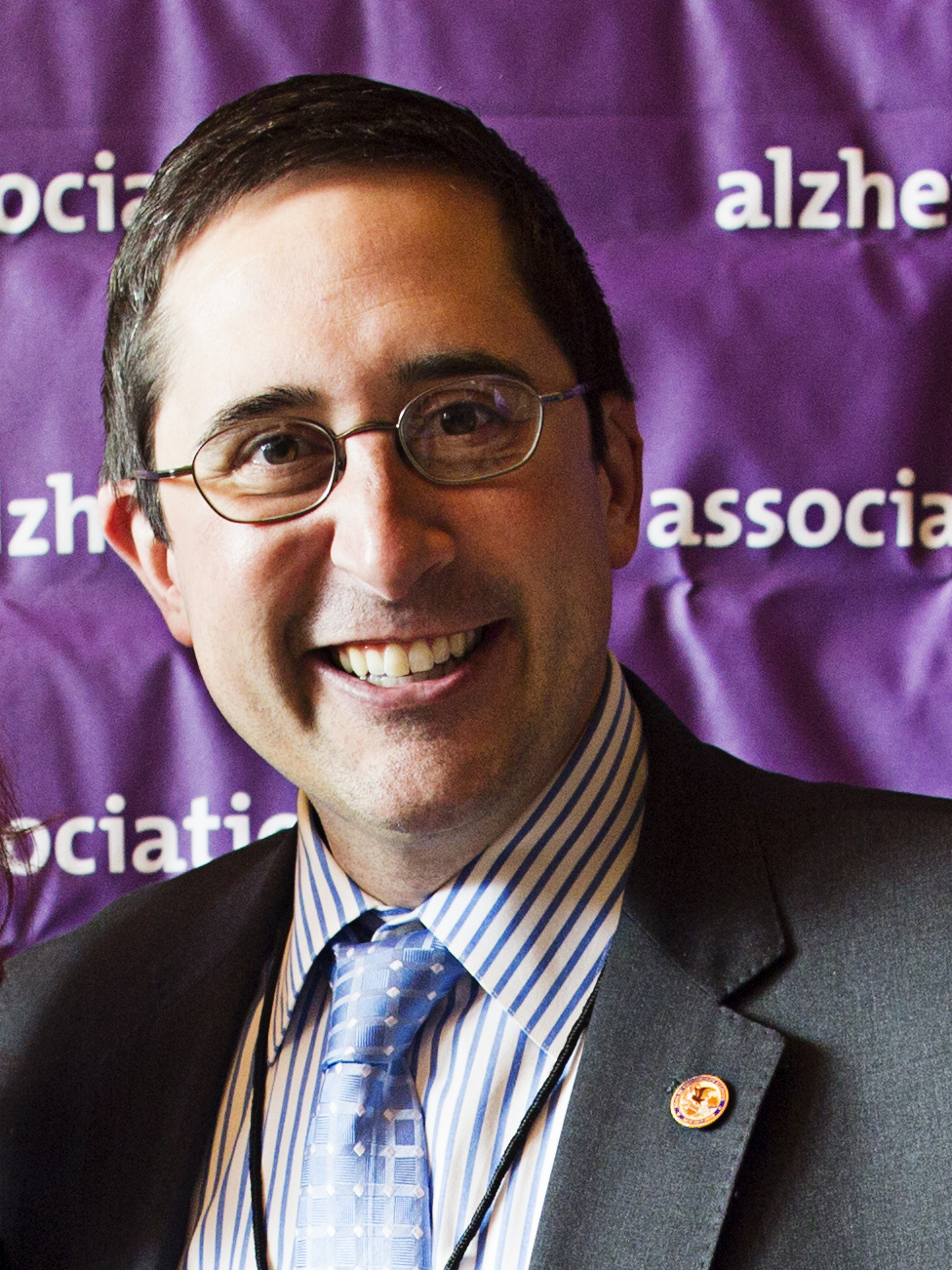
- Yingling in 2013

Member of the Illinois House of Representatives from the 62nd district
- In office January 9, 2013 – January 11, 2023
- Preceded by: Sandy Cole
- Succeeded by: Laura Faver Dias

Avon Township Supervisor
- In office May 2009 – December 2012
- Preceded by: Shirley Christian
- Succeeded by: Lisa Rusch

Personal details
- Born: July 4, 1980 (age 46) Lake County, Illinois, U.S.
- Party: Democratic
- Spouse: Lowell Jaffe
- Education: DePaul University
- Profession: Realtor & Business Owner

Sam Yingling (born July 4, 1980) is an American politician from Lake County, Illinois. A Democrat, he is a former member of the Illinois House of Representatives from the 62nd district. A resident of Grayslake, he served as the Avon Township Supervisor prior to his election to the legislature.

During his time in office, the 62nd district included all or parts of Gages Lake, Grayslake, Hainesville, Long Lake, Round Lake, Round Lake Beach, Round Lake Park, Third Lake and Wauconda.

== Early life, education and career ==
Yingling is a third generation resident of Lake County. After graduating from Carmel Catholic High School, he attended DePaul University, where he studied public administration and metropolitan land use. He then started a small business with his father. He later served as the President of the Round Lake Area Chamber of Commerce and as a member of the Round Lake Beach Cultural/Civic Center Foundation and an immigrant help organization, the Mano A Mano Family Resource Center.

Unhappy with the services that were being provided, Yingling ran for and was elected Avon Township Supervisor in 2009. As township supervisor he was the chief executive officer, chairman of the board of trustees and treasurer of all funds including all bridge and road funds. He handled the daily operations of the administration building.

During his time as supervisor he was an advocate for effective spending and efficient government. He led the township officials in cutting their own salaries by returning a raise implemented under his predecessor, reduced the budget without cutting services, and lobbied Springfield legislators to make it easier for voters to eliminate his job.

== Illinois State Representative (2013–present) ==
He was the first openly gay person elected to the legislature from outside of Chicago and as of 2013 was one of four then serving in the general assembly. The other three were Deb Mell, Greg Harris and Kelly Cassidy. He is the fifth LGBT representative ever elected. His associated state senator is Melinda Bush. During the push for passage of the Illinois marriage equality bill in 2013, he played an important role building support within his freshman class and among legislators from outside Chicago. The marriage equality bill passed the Illinois House on November 5, 2013 and was signed into law by Governor Pat Quinn on November 20, 2013. Immediately following the passage of the Illinois marriage equality bill on Nov. 5, 2013, Yingling proposed to his partner, Chicago businessman Lowell Jaffe, at an afterparty held by Gov. Pat Quinn at the executive mansion. They married in November 2015.

As of July 3, 2022, Representative Yingling is a member of the following Illinois House committees:

- (Chairman of) Counties & Townships Committee (HCOT)
- Energy & Environment Committee (HENG)
- Ethics & Elections Committee (SHEE)
- Housing Committee (SHOU)
- International Trade & Commerce Committee (HITC)
- (Chairman of) Property Tax Subcommittee (HREF-PRTX)
- Revenue & Finance Committee (HREF)

== Electoral history ==
=== 2020 ===
Sam Yingling was re-elected to a fifth term in the Illinois House of Representatives in November 2020.

Illinois 62nd Representative District General Election, 2020
Party	Candidate	Votes	%	±%
Democratic	Sam Yingling (incumbent)	27,215	56.89	+0.36%
Republican	Jim Walsh	20,619	43.11	−0.36%
Total votes		47,834	100.0	

=== 2018 ===
Sam Yingling was re-elected to a fourth term in the Illinois House of Representatives in November 2018.

Illinois 62nd Representative District General Election, 2018
Party	Candidate	Votes	%	±%
Democratic	Sam Yingling (incumbent)	19,614	56.53	+4.08%
Republican	Ken Idstein	15,082	43.47	−4.08%
Total votes		34,696	100.0	

=== 2016 ===
Sam Yingling was re-elected to a third term in the Illinois House of Representatives in November 2016.

Illinois 62nd Representative District General Election, 2016
Party	Candidate	Votes	%	±%
Democratic	Sam Yingling (incumbent)	22,050	52.45	+0.35%
Republican	Rod Drobinski	19,993	47.55	−0.35%
Total votes		42,043	100.0	

=== 2014 ===
Yingling was re-elected for a second term in the Illinois House of Representatives.

Illinois 62nd Representative District General Election, 2014
Party	Candidate	Votes	%	±%
Democratic	Sam Yingling (incumbent)	13,910	52.10	−3.19%
Republican	Rod Drobinski	12,789	47.90	+3.19%
Total votes		26,699	100.0	

=== 2012 ===
Sam Yingling was endorsed by the Illinois AFL–CIO, Equality Illinois and the Chicago Tribune. In an upset, Yingling defeated Cole with 55.3% of the vote

Illinois 62nd Representative District General Election, 2012
Party	Candidate	Votes	%
Democratic	Sam Yingling	20,994	55.29
Republican	Sandy Cole (incumbent)	16,978	44.71
Total votes		37,972	100.0
