= Highland Lake (Illinois) =

Lake in Lake County, Illinois, United States

- Lake Wyngarden
- Location within Illinois Location within the United States
- Location: Avon Township, IL
- Coordinates: 42°21′39″N 88°03′43″W
- Basin countries: United States
- Max. length: 2,000 ft (610 m)
- Max. width: 2,500 ft (760 m)
- Surface area: 110 acres (45 ha)
- Max. depth: 29 ft (8.8 m)

Highland Lake is a lake in northeastern Illinois located approximately 43 miles (69 km) north of Chicago in Avon Township of unincorporated Lake County. Nearby towns include Grayslake to the east, Round Lake Beach to the north, Round Lake to the west, and Hainesville to the south. Highland Lake is approximately 2,500 feet (760 m) wide at the widest point east to west and 2,000 feet (610 m) north to south. The total area is approximately 110 acres (45 ha). with a perimeter of 1.44 miles (2.32 km). Common activities including wading, swimming,. fishing, and a variety of non-gas powered watercraft.
