= Central Lake County Joint Action Water Agency =

The Central Lake County Joint Action Water Agency (CLCJAWA) is a public utility that provides drinking water to 250,000 people in Central Lake County, Illinois. CLCJAWA's Paul M. Neal Water Treatment facility began producing drinking water in March 1992. Prior to that time, each community it serves obtained their drinking water from wells or by purchasing it from other Lake Michigan water supplies.

== Member communities ==
CLCJAWA provides drinking water to the following communities listed in order of the date CLCJAWA water service began: Lake Bluff (3/30/92), Gurnee (5/1/92), Round Lake (5/4/92), Grayslake (5/5/92), Vernon Hills (5/11/92), Knollwood/Rondout (5/12/92), Libertyville (5/19/92), Wildwood (5/27/92), Round Lake Park (5/29/92), Mundelein (6/1/92), Round Lake Beach and Round Lake Heights, (6/8/92), Grandwood Park (7/6/17), Lindenhurst (12/11/17), Lake Villa (expected Spring 2019), Fox Lake Hills (expected Spring 2019), Wauconda (expected Summer 2019) and Volo (expected Summer 2019).

== Water treatment process ==
CLCJAWA draws water from Lake Michigan and purifies it with several water treatment processes including ozone, coagulation, flocculation, activated carbon filtration, ultraviolet light and chlorination.

== Awards and recognition ==
CLCJAWA was the third water treatment plant in the United States to win the Partnership for Safe Water "Excellence in Drinking Water" Phase IV award and the first conventional water treatment plant to achieve this status. The Partnership for Safe Drinking Water Program was created by the American Water Works Association, United States Environmental Protection Agency.

CLCJAWA has also received numerous awards from the Government Finance Officers Association. These awards include the Distinguished Budget Presentation Award and the Certificate of Achievement for Excellence in Financial Reporting.
