= Grays Lake =

Grays Lake may refer to:

- Grays Lake (Cleveland County, Arkansas), a lake
- Grays Lake (Pulaski County, Arkansas), a lake
- Grays Lake (Idaho), a lake
- Grays Lake (Illinois), a lake
- Grayslake, Illinois, a village
