= Melinda Bush =

American politician (born 1956)

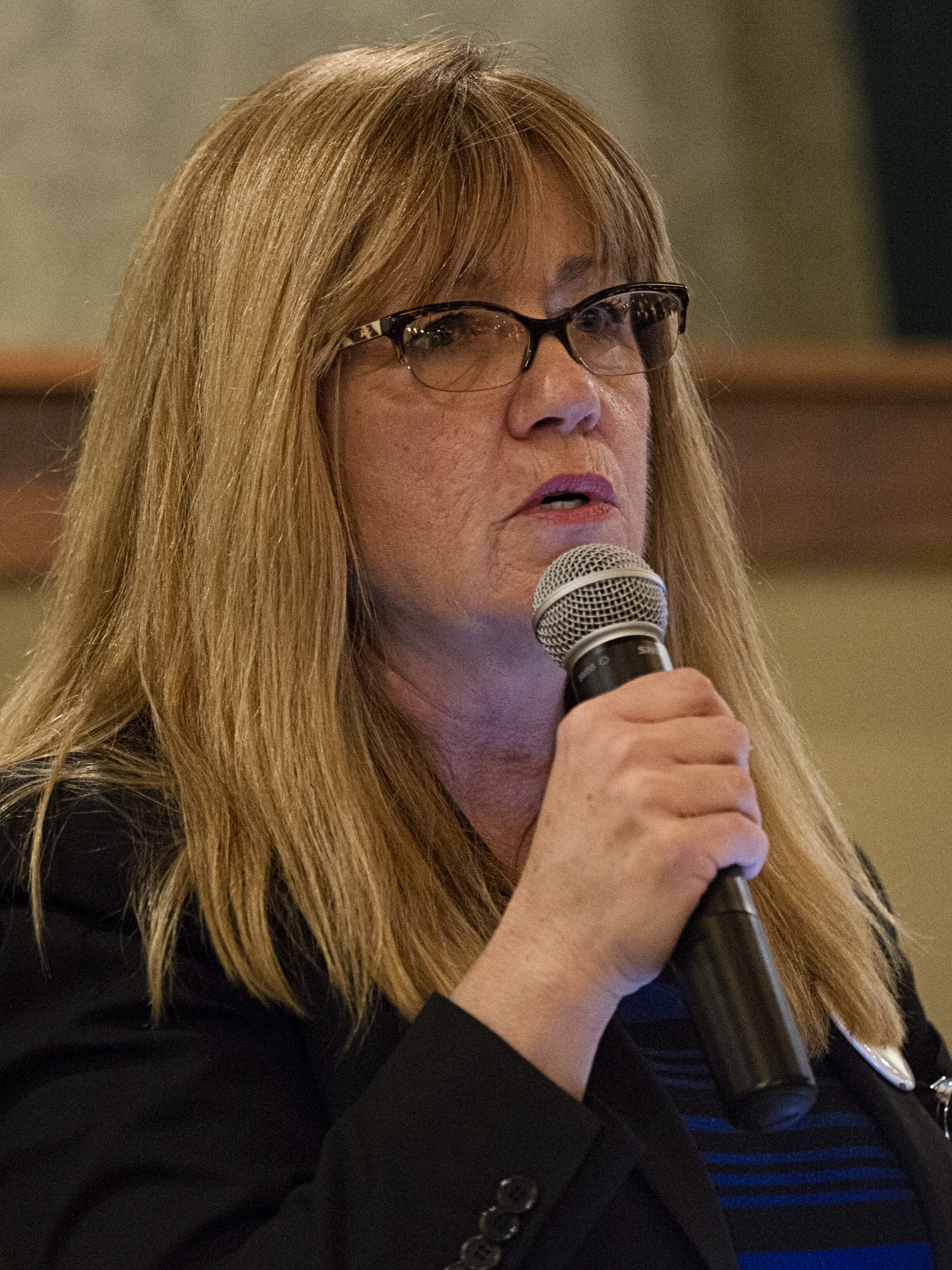
- Bush in 2015

Member of the Illinois Senate from the 31st district
- In office January 9, 2013 – January 11, 2023
- Preceded by: Suzi Schmidt
- Succeeded by: Mary Edly-Allen

Personal details
- Born: March 18, 1956 (age 70) Grayslake, Illinois, U.S.
- Party: Democratic

Melinda Bush (born March 18, 1956) is a member of the Illinois Senate for the 31st district. The 31st district spans northern Lake County and includes all or parts of Zion, Round Lake, Round Lake Beach, Gages Lake, Winthrop Harbor, Old Mill Creek, Wadsworth, Lindenhurst, Antioch, Waukegan, Gurnee, Beach Park, Grayslake and Lake Villa.

== Illinois State Senator ==
=== 2012 election ===
In the general election, Bush faced Joe Neal. She was endorsed by Lieutenant Governor Sheila Simon, Senator Terry Link, Senator Susan Garrett, State Representative Rita Mayfield, the Illinois AFL–CIO, Illinois Education Association, Illinois Sierra Club, Planned Parenthood Illinois Action, Illinois Fraternal Order of Police, the Daily Herald and future general assembly colleague Sam Yingling. On election day, Bush won in a close contest.

Illinois State Senate 23rd District General Election, 2012
Party	Candidate	Votes	%
Democratic	Melinda Bush	42,542	51.36
Republican	Joe Neal	40,281	48.64
Democratic gain from Republican			

=== Tenure ===
Her associated representatives are District 61 representative Joyce Mason (D-Gurnee) and District 62 representative Sam Yingling (D-Round Lake Beach).

As of July 2022, Senator Bush is a member of the following Illinois House committees:

- Appropriations - Business Regulations and Labor Committee (SAPP-SBRL)
- Appropriations - Government Infrastructure Committee (SAPP-SAGI)
- (Chairwoman of) Credits, Deductions, and Exemptions Committee (SREV-SRCD)
- Education Committee (SESE)
- (Chairwoman of) Environment and Conservation Committee (SNVR)
- Labor Committee (SLAB)
- Redistricting - Lake & McHenry County Committee (SRED-SRLM)
- Revenue Committee (SREV)
- Revenue - Special Issues Committee (SREV-SRSI)
- Transportation Committee (STRN)

==== Legislation ====
During her tenure in the current 101st General Assembly, Bush has sponsored a number of bills. In 2019, she sponsored the Needle and Hypodermic Syringe Access Program Act, which would allow certain groups to establish and operate a needle and hypodermic syringe access program. The bill was signed into state public law in August 2019.

Shortly before the 2020 U.S. coronavirus outbreak, Bush sponsored legislation in the Illinois Senate that would impose a new fee of $0.10 on each carryout bag from food retail establishments.

In 2020, she introduced a bill that would require prescribers (such as physicians) to offer a prescription to naloxone hydrochloride in certain situations that increase a patient's risk to overdose.

She introduced a bill in 2022 that in the interest of "freedom of choice in health care" would recognize Naturophathic Doctors as "physicians", create a "Naturopathic Physician Medical Board", and declare that the naturopathic practice "merit the confidence of the public".
