= Ehret =

Ehret is a surname. Notable people with the surname include:

- Arno Ehret (born 1953), German handball player
- Arnold Ehret (1866–1922), German health educator
- Charles Frederick Ehret (1923–2007), American World War II veteran and molecular biologist
- Christopher Ehret (1941–2025), American professor of African history and African historical linguistics
- Fabrice Ehret (born 1979), French football player
- Georg Dionysius Ehret (1708–1770), botanical illustrator
- Gloria Ehret (born 1941), American golfer
- John Ehret (born 1971), German politician
- Red Ehret (1868–1940), American baseball player
- Terry Ehret (born 1955), American poet

== See also ==
- John Ehret High School
