= C81 =

C81 or C-81 may refer to:

- C81 (album) (1981)
- C-81 (Michigan county highway)
- C-81 Reliant, a 1933 military aircraft
- Campbell Airport's FAA LID code
- Hodgkin's lymphoma's ICD-10 code
- NGC 6352's Caldwell catalog number
- Ruy Lopez's Encyclopaedia of Chess Openings code
