= Grayslake Gelatin Factory =

Coordinates: 42°20′47.2″N 88°2′21.1″W

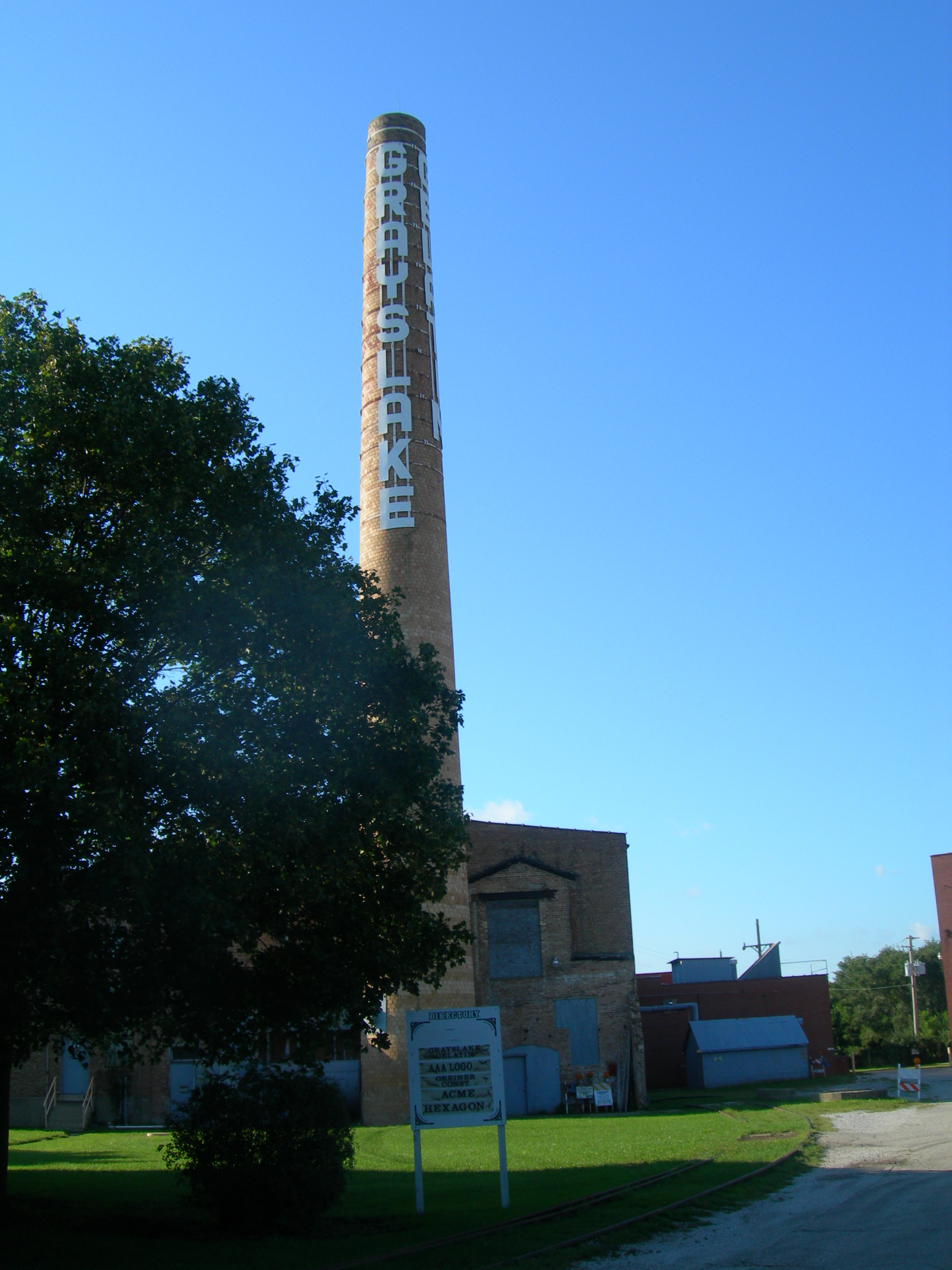
The locally famous Smoke Stack at the Grayslake Gelatin Factory reads "Grayslake Gelatin" vertically

The Grayslake Gelatin Factory is a defunct gelatin factory formerly owned by the Grayslake Gelatin Company, and is located in Grayslake, Illinois. It is locally known for its 80-foot-tall (24 m) smoke stack that still rises over the town, which has earned the nickname "Grayslake's Hollywood Sign".

== History ==
The factory was built in 1912 as a canning operation for the Wisconsin Condensed Milk Company, who briefly owned the farmland directly north. Nestle later acquired the company and closed this plant. After founder of the Grayslake Gelatin Company, Harry Epstein, discovered a modern creation process by using slaughtered animal skin opposed to bone, the building was repurposed for gelatin production 1922. The original plant was expanded over the years, with two additional buildings constructed on the property. Epstein's son: John, became president of the company before gelatin production ceased in 1982.

The company re-acquired the adjacent dairy farm directly north in 1967; with 14.67 acres of the farm being sold to the village in 1979 to form Central Park, and an additional 40 acres being purchased in 1991. In the following two decades: the village's library, aquatic center, skate park, community garden, and senior citizen housing were built on the remaining property.

Following its closure, the Epstein family continued to operate the Grayslake Gelatin Company as a real estate lessor, with various tenants renting parts of the former plant. In July 2013, the Epstein family announced the property would be auctioned in August, however the outcome was a no-sale. Over two years later, citing the property's poor structural and environmental condition: the village of Grayslake purchased the 10-acre property for $30,000 with intentions of redeveloping the site, and is looking into preserving its iconic smokestack. The buildings were demolished in the winter of 2016/17.
