= Albert G. Burr =

American politician (1829–1882)

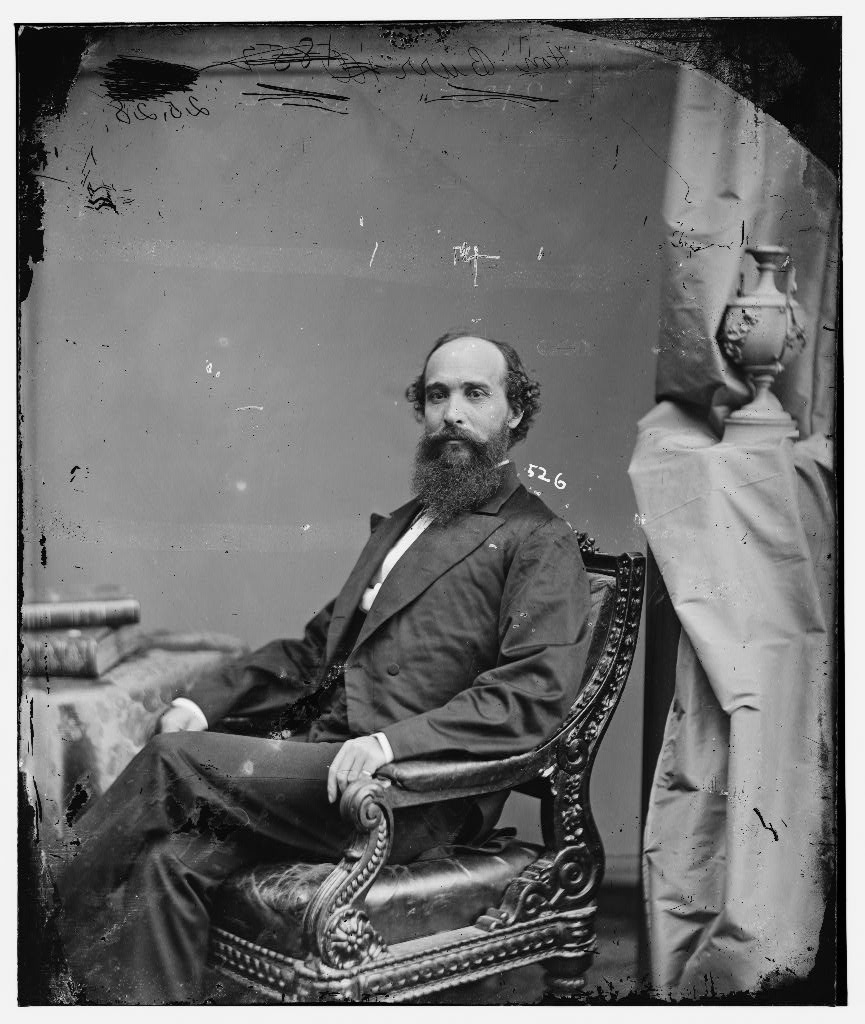

Member of the U.S. House of Representatives from Illinois's 10th district
- In office March 4, 1867 – March 3, 1871
- Preceded by: Anthony Thornton
- Succeeded by: Edward Y. Rice

Judge of the Circuit Court for the Seventh District of Illinois
- In office 1877–1882
- Preceded by: None (Position created)
- Succeeded by: George W. Herdman

Chairman of the Illinois Democratic State Committee
- In office June 15, 1870 – June 26, 1872
- Preceded by: John Alexander McClernand
- Succeeded by: Cyrus McCormick

Personal details
- Born: November 8, 1829 Genesee County, New York
- Died: June 10, 1882 (aged 52) Carrollton, Illinois
- Resting place: Carrollton, Illinois
- Party: Democratic
- Spouse(s): Alicia A. Anderson; Mary Harlan
- Children: 5
- Profession: Attorney

Albert George Burr (November 8, 1829 – June 10, 1882) was a United States representative in Congress from the state of Illinois for two terms, the 40th and 41st Congresses (serving from March 4, 1867, until March 3, 1871). He was a member of the Democratic Party.

== Biography ==
He was born near Batavia, New York, on November 8, 1829, the son of George Washington Burr and Phoebe (Sweet) Burr. His father had left New York for Illinois earlier that year, intending to begin a homestead and then return for his family, but he disappeared under circumstances that were never solved.

Burr's mother moved the family to Sangamon County, Illinois in 1830. Burr had to begin working as a child in order to help support the family, and his youth included a job in a brickyard and other manual labor. He was largely self-taught, and after completing his education and receiving his teaching qualification, he taught school for several years in Vandalia. In 1850, he moved to Winchester, Illinois, where he worked as a merchant and studied law. He was admitted to the bar in 1856 and commenced practice in Winchester.

A Democrat, he served in the Illinois House of Representatives from 1861 to 1864. In 1862, he was a delegate to the state constitutional convention. In 1866 he won election to Congress, and he served two terms, 1867 to 1871. He did not run for re-election in 1870 and resumed the practice of law in Carrollton. In June 1870, Burr was elected chairman of the Illinois Democratic State Committee, and he served until 1872.

In 1877, the Seventh District of the Illinois Circuit Court was expanded from two judges to three. Burr was elected to the new position, and served until his death.

== Family ==
Burr's first wife was Alicia A. Anderson, with whom he had two children, Louis and Lucy. After his first wife's death, Burr married Mary Harlan (1837–1913). They were the parents of three children, Mary, Albert, and William.

== Death and burial ==
Burr died in Carrollton on June 10, 1882, and was buried at Carrollton City Cemetery.

== Sources ==
=== Books ===
- Continental Historical Company (1885). History of Greene and Jersey Counties, Illinois. Roodhouse, IL: Daily Eye Book Printing House.
- Hamilton, Oscar Brown (1919). History of Jersey County, Illinois. Chicago, IL: Munsell Publishing Company. "albert g. burr greene county."
- Palmer, John McAuley (1899). The Bench and Bar of Illinois. Vol. II. Chicago, IL: Lewis Publishing Company.
- Spencer, Thomas E. (1998). Where They're Buried. Baltimore, MD: Clearfield Company. p. 167. ISBN 978-0-8063-4823-0.
- Todd, Charles Burr (1891). A General History of the Burr Family, with a Genealogical Record from 1193 to 1891. New York, NY: Knickerbocker Press.
- Prominent Democrats of Illinois. Chicago, IL: Democrat Publishing Co. 1899.

U.S. House of Representatives
Preceded by Anthony Thornton	Member of the U.S. House of Representatives from Illinois's 10th congressional district March 4, 1867 – March 3, 1871	Succeeded by Edward Y. Rice
