= The Capricorns =

American indietronica band

- Origin: Grayslake, Illinois, U.S.
- Genres: Indietronica
- Years active: 2000–2006
- Labels: Paroxysm Records, Banazan Records
- Members: Heather Lynn; Kirsten Nordine
- Website: Archive index at the Wayback Machine

The Capricorns were an indietronica band consisting of Heather Lynn and Kirsten Nordine, both of whom sing and play keyboards, with Lynn also playing tambourine. They formed their band in the spring of 2000, playing on vintage Casio keyboards purchased at garage sales. They write pop songs which one of their labels described as combining "infectious hooks with 'dear diary' lyrics". They are originally from Grayslake, Illinois.

== Band history ==
On the band's website, Lynn commented on their start and early success:

When we started making music, it was just for fun. We knew that Kirsten would be moving away in a few months and i would be focused on my writing. We didn't anticipate that people would be so into our music or that we would ever end up putting out records. It's really rad that people like us so much, but because we didn't start a band to become famous or to get signed or whatever we aren't necessarily motivated by the same things that other bands are.

Nordine and Lynn traveled to Cincinnati, Ohio to record their first album, The Capricorns Are Gonna Get You, a now-out of print cassette released on their own label. Jason Barnett, of Paroxysm Records, heard the record, and offered them a record contract.

Their second album, In the Zone, was described by Kotori magazine as "All casio all the time (with occasional tambourine), they've got hooks so sweet you can't help but get addicted". and by Allmusic as "the perfect soundtrack for when the Powerpuff Girls become the Powerpuff Late Teenagers, mixing in a touch more angst but still gleefully kicking ass and taking names."

The duo's last album, Pure Magical Love, was released in January 2006, and according to Jessie Nelson of the Athens Exchange, "oozes quintessential girliness", going on to describe it as "girl music for women who remember being ten, dressing up in old clothes and dancing around the living room to Madonna". In spring of 2008, Heather Lynn created a live performance of the Pure Magical Love record that she performed at Version Festival in Chicago, which evolved into a band called Pure Magical Love.

== Discography ==
- The Capricorns Are Gonna Get You, circa 2000, out of print
- In The Zone, 2001, Paroxysm Records

1. The New Sound
2. Nintendo Song
3. Geeky Pop Song
4. Remote Control
5. In The Closet
6. The Longest Drive
7. Stay Awake
8. Nathan II
9. Song For 18
10. The Back Room
11. Teenage Boyfriend
12. Pretty Girls
13. In The Zone

- Go The Distance, July 2003, Banazan Records

1. Sunset Over Malibu
2. Beatbox
3. 'Mickey Baby
4. You'll Never Be Mine
5. Recyclone
6. Slow 80's Song
7. Prisoners of Love
8. Yeah, So?
9. Everywhere I Go
10. New York Is Burning

- Pure Magical Love, January 2006, Paroxysm Records

1. Pure Magical Love
2. Vega City
3. The Sailor
4. Don't Close Your Eyes
5. Runaway
6. Call Me Down
7. Rilya
8. Ghosts
9. End of the World Love Song
