= William H. Ray =

American politician

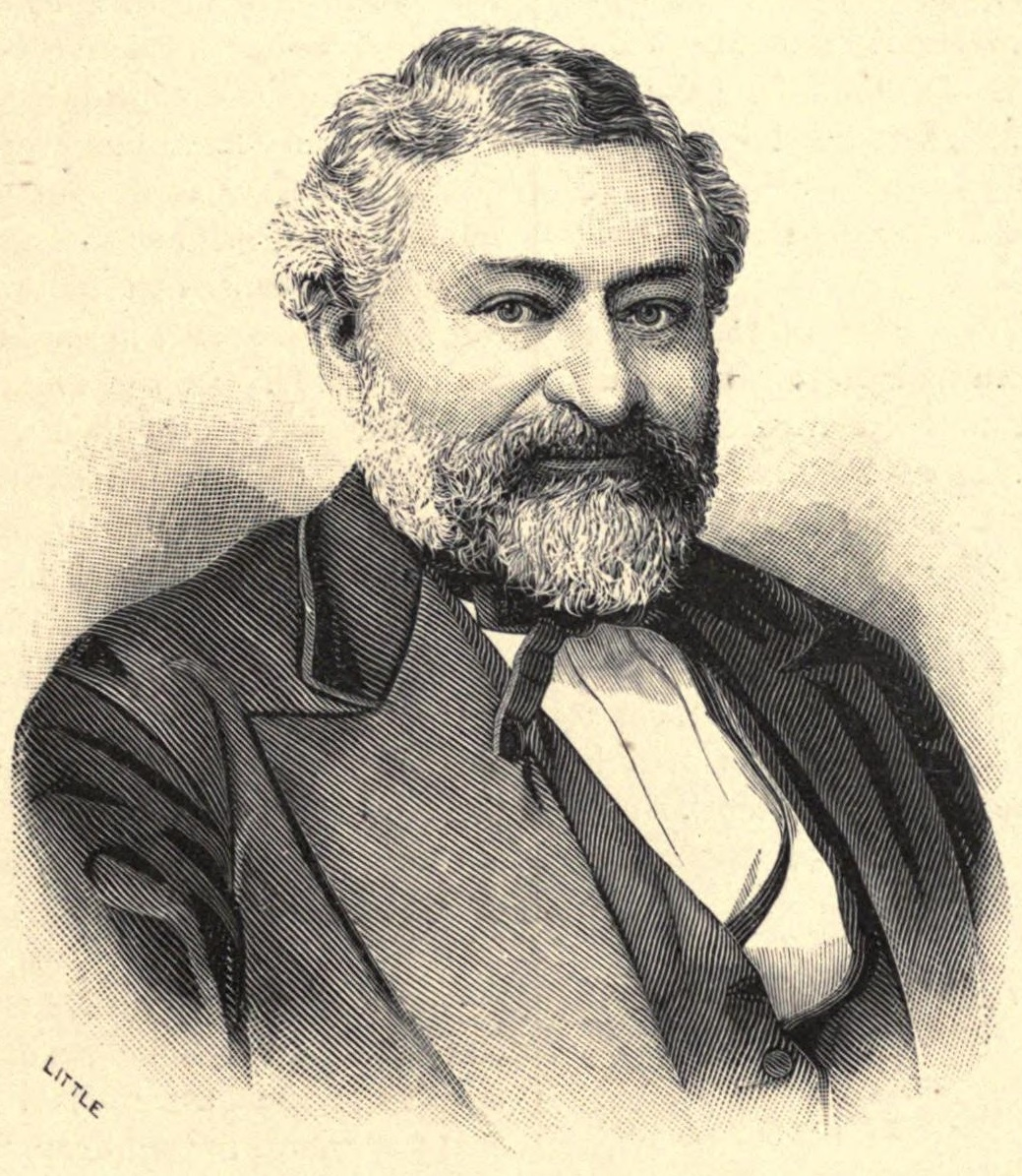
- From 1882's Combined history of Schuyler and Brown Counties, Illinois

Member of the U.S. House of Representatives from Illinois's 10th district
- In office March 4, 1873 – March 3, 1875
- Preceded by: Edward Y. Rice
- Succeeded by: John C. Bagby

Personal details
- Born: December 14, 1812 Amenia, New York
- Died: January 25, 1881 (aged 68) Rushville, Illinois
- Party: Republican
- Spouse(s): Jane F. Ray, Mabel Tolles

William Henry Ray (December 14, 1812 – January 25, 1881) was an American politician. He served as a member of the United States House of Representatives from Illinois.

== Biography ==
Born on December 14, 1812, in Amenia, New York. Ray moved to Oneida County, New York, in 1813 with his parents who settled in Utica. He attended the common schools.

He moved to Rushville, Illinois, in 1834. In 1849, he purchased the home at 417 West Washington Street in Rushville, IL. Ray hosted his personal friend Abraham Lincoln at the home for an overnight stay before Lincoln's public address in Rushville in October 1858. Today the home is owned by the Schuyler County Architecture Foundation and is still known as the Ray House. A capital campaign for the full restoration of the Ray House by the Schuyler County Architecture Foundation is currently underway. In May 2019, the Ray House was added to the list of the 12 most endangered historic places in the State of Illinois.

He engaged in mercantile pursuits. He was also interested in banking. He served as member of the first State Board of Equalization 1867–1869.

Ray was elected as a Republican to the Forty-third Congress (March 4, 1873–March 3, 1875).

He resumed his former business pursuits in Rushville, Illinois, and died there January 25, 1881. He was interred in Rushville Cemetery.

== Family ==
He had been married twice. His brother in-law was R. C. Chambers, a politician and businessperson.

U.S. House of Representatives
Preceded by Edward Y. Rice	Member of the U.S. House of Representatives from Illinois's 10th congressional district March 4, 1873 – March 3, 1875	Succeeded by John C. Bagby
