= Edward Y. Rice =

American politician

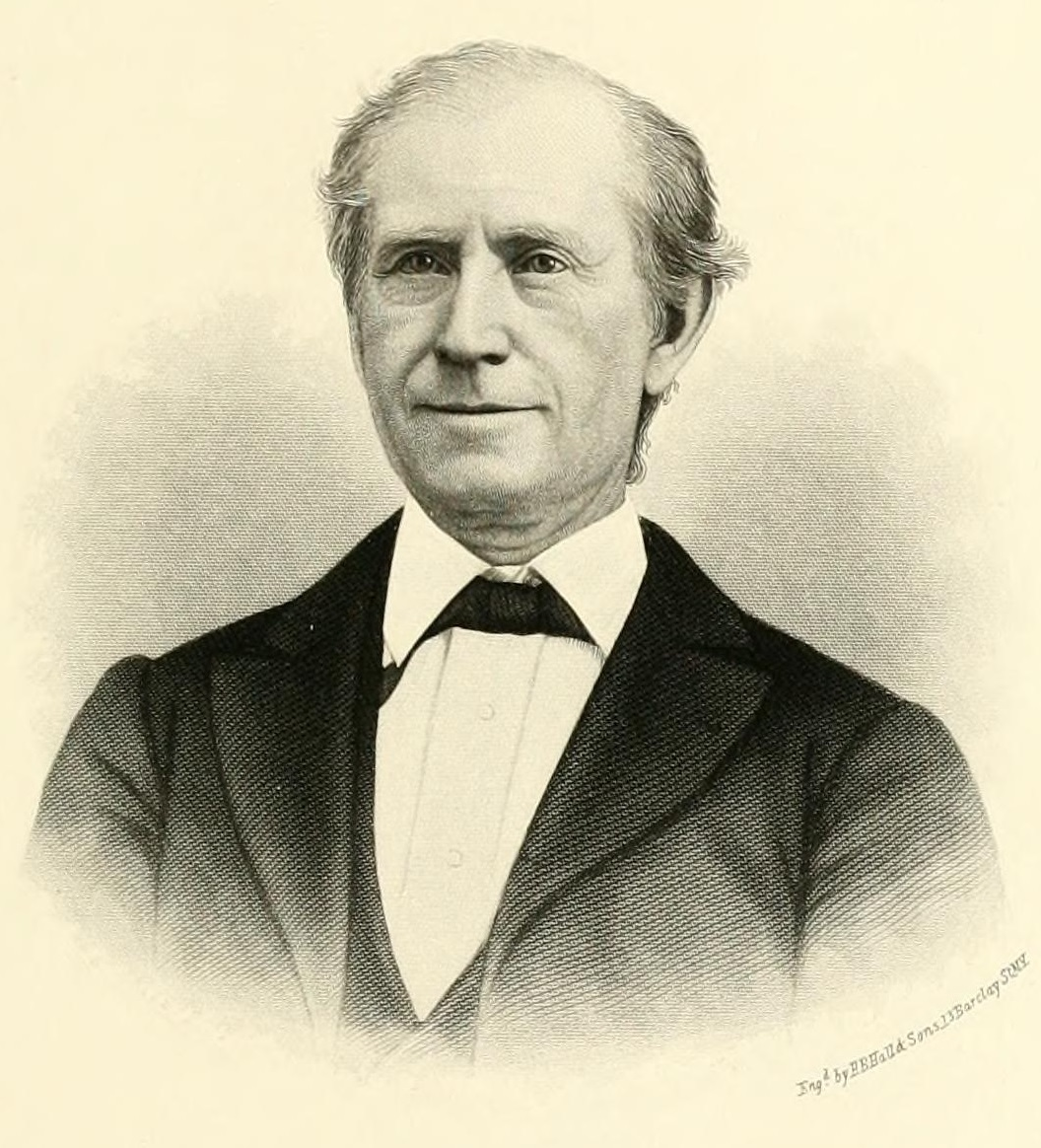
- From 1904's Past and Present of Montgomery County, Illinois

Member of the U.S. House of Representatives from Illinois's 10th district
- In office March 4, 1871 – March 3, 1873
- Preceded by: Albert G. Burr
- Succeeded by: William H. Ray

Personal details
- Born: February 8, 1820 Russellville, Kentucky
- Died: April 16, 1883 (aged 63) Hillsboro, Illinois
- Party: Democratic

Edward Young Rice (February 8, 1820 – April 16, 1883) was a U.S. representative from Illinois.

== Biography ==
Born near Russellville, Kentucky, Rice pursued classical studies. He studied law. He was admitted to the bar in 1844. He moved to Montgomery County, Illinois, and commenced practice in Hillsboro, Illinois.

Rice was elected county recorder in 1847. He served as member of the State house of representatives in 1849 and 1850. He served as judge of the Montgomery County Court in 1851 and 1852. He served as master in chancery 1853-1857.

Rice was elected judge of the Eighteenth Judicial Circuit Court of Illinois in 1857 and reelected in 1861 and 1867. He served as member of the State constitutional convention in 1869 and 1870.

Rice was elected as a Democrat to the Forty-second Congress (March 4, 1871 – March 3, 1873). He was an unsuccessful candidate for renomination in 1872. He resumed the practice of law in Hillsboro and Springfield, Illinois. He died in Hillsboro, Illinois, April 16, 1883. He was interred in Oak Grove Cemetery.

U.S. House of Representatives
Preceded by Albert G. Burr	Member of the U.S. House of Representatives from Illinois's 10th congressional district March 4, 1871 – March 3, 1873	Succeeded by William H. Ray
