= Anthony Thornton (politician) =

American politician from Illinois (1814–1904)

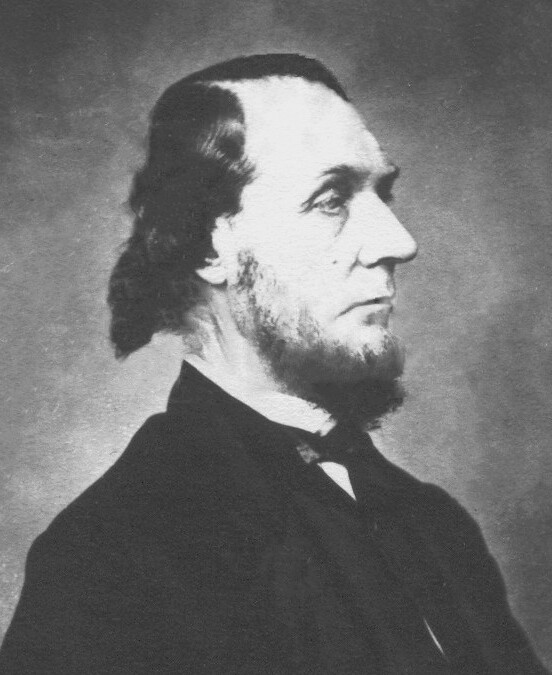
- Anthony Thornton, ca. 1865

Judge of the Supreme Court of Illinois
- In office 1870–1873

Member of the U.S. House of Representatives from Illinois's 10th district
- In office March 4, 1865 – March 3, 1867
- Preceded by: Anthony L. Knapp
- Succeeded by: Albert G. Burr

Member of the Illinois House of Representatives
- In office 1851–52

Personal details
- Born: November 9, 1814 Paris, Kentucky
- Died: September 10, 1904 (aged 83) Shelbyville, Illinois
- Party: Democratic

Anthony Thornton (November 9, 1814 – September 10, 1904) was an American attorney who served as a U.S. representative from Illinois and a justice of the Illinois Supreme Court.

== Biography ==
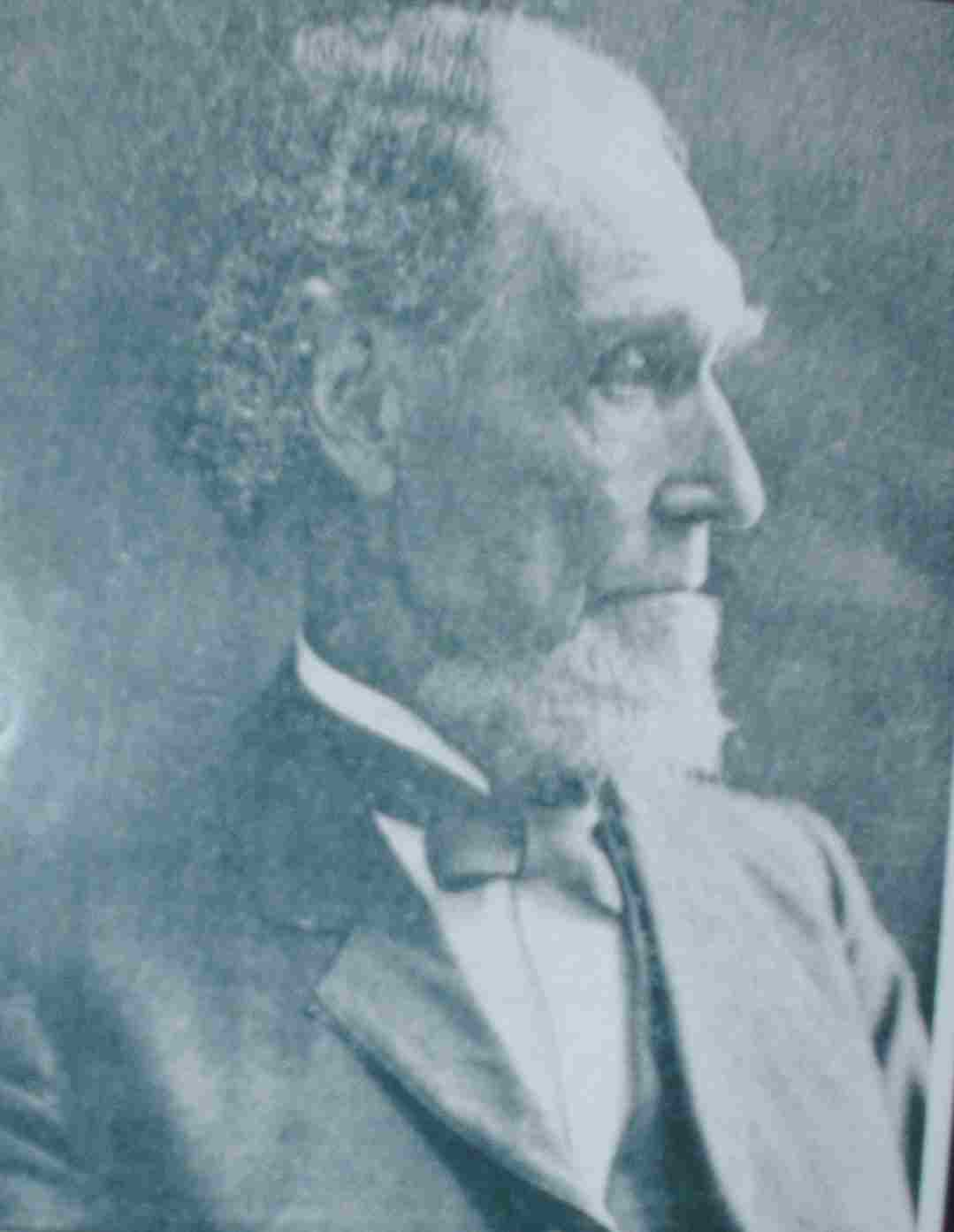
An older Anthony Thornton.

Born near Paris, Kentucky, Thornton attended the common schools and Centre College, Danville, Kentucky. He graduated from Miami University, Ohio, in 1834. He studied law under his uncle, John R. Thornton. He was admitted to the bar and commenced practice in Shelbyville, Illinois, in 1836. He served as major of militia during the war with Mexico. He served as delegate to the State constitutional conventions in 1847 and 1862, and was a member of the Illinois House of Representatives in 1851–52. In 1856, he held a joint debate with Abraham Lincoln in Shelbyville, Illinois.

Thornton was elected as a Democrat to the Thirty-ninth Congress (March 4, 1865 – March 3, 1867). He was not a candidate for renomination in 1866. He resumed the practice of law. He served as justice of the Supreme Court of Illinois from 1870 to 1873, when he resigned. He served as president of the Illinois State Bar Association for four terms. He served as chairman of the State board of arbitration 1895–1897. He died in Shelbyville, Illinois, on September 10, 1904. He was interred in Glenwood Cemetery.

U.S. House of Representatives
Preceded by Anthony L. Knapp	Member of the U.S. House of Representatives from Illinois's 10th congressional district March 4, 1865 – March 3, 1867	Succeeded by Albert G. Burr
