= Sandy Cole =

American politician

Member of the Illinois House of Representatives from the 62nd district
- In office 2007–2012
- Preceded by: Robert W. Churchill
- Succeeded by: Sam Yingling

Personal details
- Born: December 29, 1953 (age 72) Green Bay, Wisconsin
- Party: Republican
- Spouse: Stephen
- Children: Three
- Education: Rockford College (B.S.)

Sandy Cole (born 1953) is a former Republican member of the Illinois House of Representatives, representing the 62nd district for six years, from January 2007 until January 2013.

== Illinois House of Representatives ==
Sandy Cole was elected to the Illinois House of Representatives on November 7, 2006. Cole was elected to serve the 62nd District, which represents all or portions of the central Lake County communities of Grayslake, Gurnee, Wildwood, Grandwood Park, Hainesville, Round Lake Beach, Round Lake Heights, Round Lake Park, Lake Villa, Lindenhurst, Wadsworth and Third Lake. Her election to the Illinois House followed her ten years of service on the Lake County Board, where she was a leader on a wide variety of issues from open space, environmental protection, and transportation. Sandy Cole served on the Lake County Board from 1996 to 2006 representing the 11th District.

During her service as State Representative, Sandy Cole has championed her "Family Focus" legislative agenda, a comprehensive list of legislative priorities aimed at improving the quality of life for families and communities in Lake County and throughout Illinois. Representative Cole has been a leader in the General Assembly on women's health issues, transportation, open space, fiscal responsibility, children's safety, and senior issues.

The 62nd district's 2010 primary included endorsements from The Daily Herald, Chicago Tribune, and The Pioneer Press. On February 2, 2010, Cole won her primary against Paul Mitchell and on November 2, 2010, she defeated Democrat Rich Voltair in the general election.

She had no primary opponents for the 2012 election, but was defeated by Democrat Sam Yingling in the general election in November.

== Civic involvement ==
Cole has also been committed throughout her life to civic involvement and volunteerism. Her civic activities have included service as a Volunteer Youth Leader for 4-H, an Assistant Coach for Township T-Ball & Softball, a University Of Ill. Extension Master Gardener, a Grayslake Greenery Garden Club member, a Voter Registrar, Republican Precinct Committeeman, a member of the board of directors for the Rockford College Alumni Association, a member of the Grayslake/Round Lake Area Exchange Club, and the Avon Township Youth Advisory Council.

== Family ==
She earned her B.S. degree from Rockford College in 1976. She is married to Stephen Cole. The couple have three children; two daughters and one son.
