= John C. Bagby =

American politician

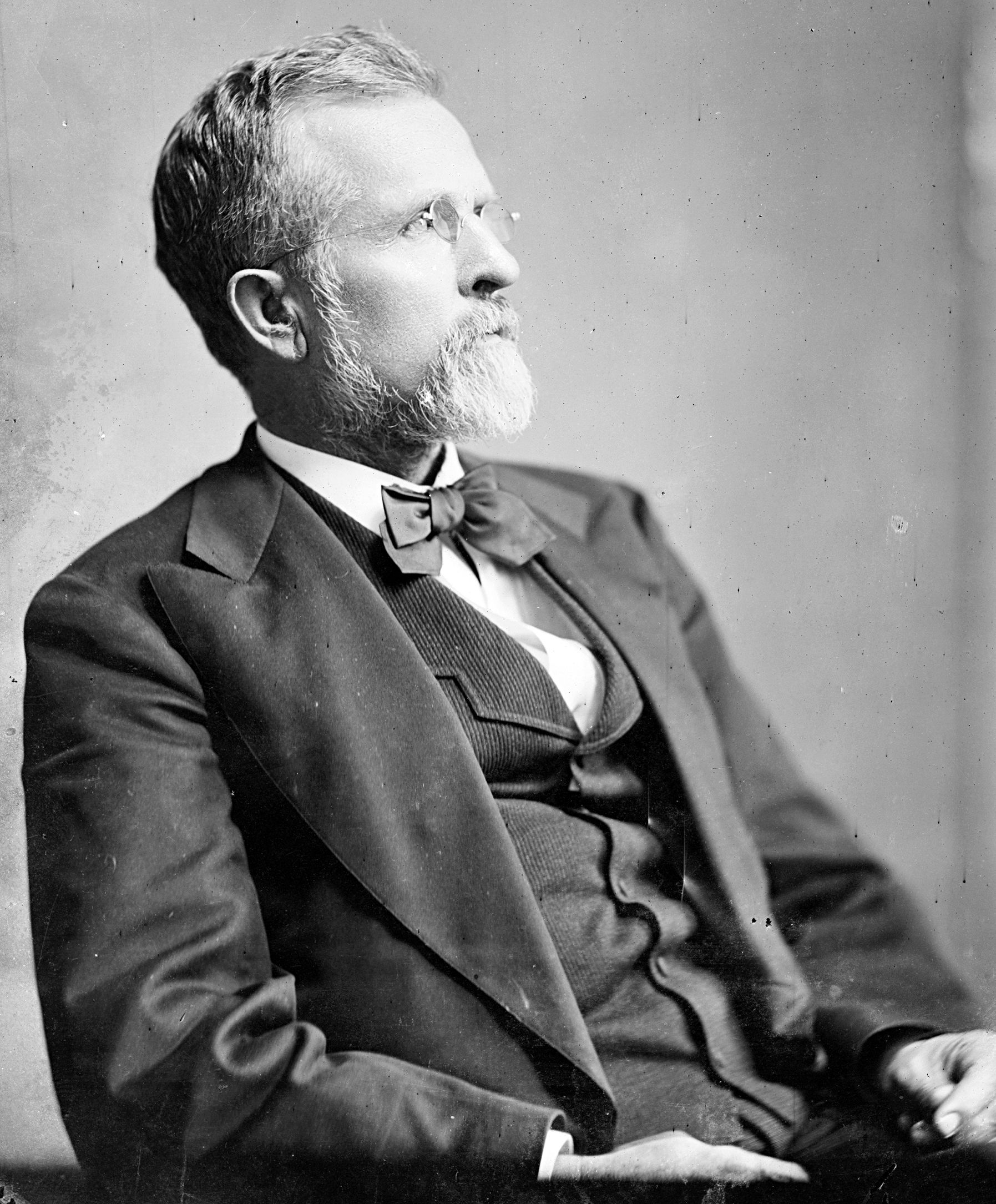

Member of the U.S. House of Representatives from Illinois's 10th district
- In office March 4, 1875 – March 3, 1877
- Preceded by: William H. Ray
- Succeeded by: Benjamin F. Marsh

Personal details
- Born: January 24, 1819 Glasgow, Kentucky
- Died: April 4, 1896 (aged 77) Rushville, Illinois
- Party: Democratic

John Courts Bagby (January 24, 1819 – April 4, 1896) was a U.S. representative from Illinois.

Born in Glasgow, Kentucky, Bagby attended the public schools. He graduated as a civil engineer from Bacon College, Harrodsburg, Kentucky, in June 1840, and studied law. He was admitted to the bar in March 1845 and commenced practice in Rushville, Illinois, in April 1846.

Bagby was elected as a Democrat to the Forty-fourth Congress (March 4, 1875 – March 3, 1877). He was not a candidate for renomination in 1876. He resumed the practice of his profession in Rushville, Illinois. He served as judge of Schuyler County 1882–1885. He served as judge of the sixth judicial circuit court of Illinois 1885–1891. He resumed the practice of law. He died in Rushville, Illinois on April 4, 1896, aged 77. He was interred in Rushville Cemetery.

U.S. House of Representatives
Preceded by William H. Ray	Member of the U.S. House of Representatives from Illinois's 10th congressional district March 4, 1875 – March 3, 1877	Succeeded by Benjamin F. Marsh
