= Campbell Airport =

Airport in Illinois, United States

- IATA: none; ICAO: none; FAA LID: C81

Summary
- Airport type: Public
- Owner: Kane Illinois Properties
- Serves: Grayslake, Illinois
- Elevation AMSL: 788 ft (240 m)
- Coordinates: 42°19′29″N 088°04′27″W

Map
- Location of airport in Illinois C81 (the United States)

Runways
Direction	Length		Surface
Direction	ft	m	Surface
9/27	3,270	997	Asphalt
6/24	3,573	1,089	Asphalt/turf

Statistics
- Aircraft operations (2019): 30,000
- Based aircraft (2022): 0
- Source: Federal Aviation Administration

Campbell Airport (FAA LID: C81) is a public-use airport located two miles (3 km) southwest of the central business district of Grayslake, a village in Lake County, Illinois, United States. It is privately owned by Kane Illinois Properties, Inc.

== Facilities and aircraft ==
Campbell Airport covers an area of 243 acres (98 ha) which contains two runways: 9/27 with a 3,270 x 40 ft (997 x 12 m) asphalt pavement and 6/24 with a 3,573 x 40 ft (1,089 x 12 m) asphalt and turf surface.

For the 12-month period ending July 31, 2022, the airport had 30,000 general aviation aircraft operations, an average of 82 per day. At that time, there were no aircraft based at this airport.

== Accidents & Incidents ==
- On October 13, 1981, a Cessna 310 crashed after takeoff from Campbell. The four people on board were killed.
- On August 15, 1999, a Piper PA-28 Cherokee impacted power lines a mile southwest of the airport while on approach. All four people on board died. The probable cause was the pilot's inability to maintain altitude and obstruction clearance. Contributing factors include nighttime conditions and the pilot's lack of recent experience at night.
- On August 31, 2001, an amateur-built Spears RV-6 crashed one mile west of Campbell while on approach to the airport. The probable cause was found to be an inadvertent stall with impairment due to marijuana as a contributing factor.
- On April 11, 2003, a Cessna 172 Skyhawk nosed over following a loss of directional control while landing at the Campbell Airport. The CFI reported the student was circling to land on runway 9 because of wind conditions reported at nearby Waukegan Airport. The CFI reported the student was landing on the runway centerline, but was about 10 knots fast and the student's "flare was minimal, creating a flat landing." The CFI stated she pulled back on the yoke, the airplane became airborne, and she established another flare. The CFI reported the airplane touched down on the left side of the runway and continued to veer to the left. The CFI reported the airplane veered into the mud at the side of the runway. Another nearby station later reported the winds to be from 050 degrees at 14 knots gusting to 18 knots. The probable cause was found to be the flight instructor's improper in-flight decision to land with a tailwind and failure to maintain directional control of the airplane during landing.
- On April 2, 2006, a Piper Cherokee Six veered off the runway during landing at Campbell. The reported winds were 120 degrees at 11 knots gusting to 21 knots. The pilot reported that he had a right crab on final to compensate for winds but that a crab was not needed at all just prior to touchdown. But immediately after touchdown, the aircraft veered left. The pilot reacted by putting in full right aileron and applying right rudder, but he did not apply any pressure to the toe brakes. The airplane veered off the left side of the runway. The airplane encountered soft terrain, spun around, and impacted a ditch. The probable cause was found to be the pilot's failure to compensate adequately for the crosswind condition and his failure to maintain directional control during the landing roll.
- On May 7, 2006, a Piper PA-28 impacted a parked aircraft while taxiing for departure. The probable cause was found to be the student pilot's failure to maintain clearance from the parked vehicle during taxi and the flight instructor's inadequate operational oversight.
- On August 27, 2008, a Beech C23 Musketeer was substantially damaged during a hard landing at Campbell Airport. The flight instructor stated that they performed several maneuvers over the Chain of Lakes and, during their return to PWK, flew to C81 to perform takeoffs and landings, which, according to the student pilot, were discussed before the flight. The pilot said that it was getting dark while he performed his third approach to land and he could not see runway lights. As the student began to round out and flare, he didn't know how many feet the airplane was above the runway when he pulled “too far back on the yoke,” which made the airplane “slow too much and drop.” The flight instructor then said “power power,” and the airplane hit hard, bounced, and banked to the right. Within several seconds, the airplane slowed down and impacted the runway. The flight instructor then applied full engine power and performed an aborted landing. The probable cause was found to be the inadequate flare by the student pilot and the inadequate supervision and delayed go-around performed by the flight instructor. Contributing to the accident were the student pilot's failure to attain/maintain a stabilized approach.
- On November 12, 2017, a Cessna 210 made an emergency landing at Campbell while experiencing engine issues. The plane was flying from Pierre, South Dakota to Chicago Executive Airport. The pilot did not report any injuries.
- On July 21, 2020, a plane overshot the runway while landing at Campbell. It came to rest in a field at the end of one runway. The sole pilot on board was not injured.

== See also ==
- List of airports in Illinois
- Grayslake station
