= Avon Township, Illinois =

Avon Township
- Township
- Seal

- Location in Lake County

- Lake County's location in Illinois
- Coordinates: 42°21′25″N 88°03′50″W
- Country: United States
- State: Illinois
- County: Lake
- Established: November 6, 1849

Area
  - Total: 23.79 sq mi (61.6 km^{2})
  - Land: 22.44 sq mi (58.1 km^{2})
  - Water: 1.34 sq mi (3.5 km^{2})
- Elevation: 784 ft (239 m)

Population (2020)
  - Total: 63,708
  - Density: 2,839/sq mi (1,096/km^{2})
- Time zone: UTC-6 (CST)
  - Summer (DST): UTC-5 (CDT)
- FIPS code: 17-097-03220
- Website: www.avonil.us

Avon Township is a township in Lake County, Illinois, USA. As of the 2020 census, its population was 63,708.

== Geography ==
According to the 2021 census gazetteer files, Avon Township has a total area of 23.79 square miles (61.62 km^{2}), of which 22.44 square miles (58.12 km^{2}) (or 94.36%) is land and 1.34 square miles (3.47 km^{2}) (or 5.64%) is water. Lakes in this township include Cranberry Lake, Druce Lake, Grays Lake, Highland Lake and Third Lake.

== Demographics ==
As of the 2020 census there were 63,708 people, 21,478 households, and 15,634 families residing in the township. The population density was 2,678.49 inhabitants per square mile (1,034.17/km^{2}). There were 22,491 housing units at an average density of 945.60 per square mile (365.10/km^{2}). The racial makeup of the township was 53.62% White, 4.76% African American, 1.59% Native American, 4.64% Asian, 0.09% Pacific Islander, 19.49% from other races, and 15.81% from two or more races. Hispanic or Latino of any race were 39.86% of the population.

There were 21,478 households, out of which 38.30% had children under the age of 18 living with them, 59.07% were married couples living together, 9.28% had a female householder with no spouse present, and 27.21% were non-families. 21.90% of all households were made up of individuals, and 8.30% had someone living alone who was 65 years of age or older. The average household size was 2.97 and the average family size was 3.56.

The township's age distribution consisted of 25.9% under the age of 18, 10.3% from 18 to 24, 27% from 25 to 44, 26.1% from 45 to 64, and 10.7% who were 65 years of age or older. The median age was 35.9 years. For every 100 females, there were 106.8 males. For every 100 females age 18 and over, there were 105.3 males.

The median income for a household in the township was $81,496, and the median income for a family was $94,000. Males had a median income of $46,510 versus $34,070 for females. The per capita income for the township was $33,615. About 5.4% of families and 8.0% of the population were below the poverty line, including 11.6% of those under age 18 and 8.1% of those age 65 or over.

Historical population
Census	Pop.	Note	%±
2010	65,001		—
2020	63,708		−2.0%
U.S. Decennial Census

== Elected officials ==
- Supervisor - Michele Bauman
- Clerk - Kristal Larson
- Assessor - Chris Ditton
- Trustees- Jeanne Kearby, Mike Dobrow, Jeff Loffredo and Rudolph Repa

Website: www.avonil.us

=== Cities and towns ===
- Grayslake (west three-quarters)
- Hainesville
- Long Lake (east quarter)
- Round Lake (east three-quarters)
- Round Lake Beach (southeast three-quarters)
- Round Lake Heights (southeast half)
- Round Lake Park
- Third Lake

=== Adjacent townships ===
- Lake Villa Township (north)
- Warren Township (east)
- Libertyville Township (southeast)
- Fremont Township (south)
- Wauconda Township (southwest)
- Grant Township (west)

=== Cemeteries ===
The township contains six cemeteries: Avon Centre in Grayslake; Druce in Third Lake; Fort Hill (historic) in Round Lake; Grayslake in Grayslake; New Gracaniga Servian Orthodox in Third Lake; St. Joseph Catholic in Round Lake.

=== Major highways ===
- U.S. Route 45
- Illinois State Route 83
- Illinois State Route 120
- Illinois State Route 134
- Illinois State Route 137
