= Charles F. Ehret =

American researcher (1923–2007)

Charles Frederick Ehret (March 9, 1923 – February 24, 2007) was a World War II veteran and molecular biologist who worked at Argonne National Laboratory (ANL) in Lemont, Illinois, for 40 years.

Ehret researched the effects of electromagnetic radiation on bacillus megaterium with Edward Lawrence (Larry) Powers, as well as the effects of time shifts on paramecia, rats and humans. A graduate of City College of New York and the University of Notre Dame, Ehret formulated the term "circadian dyschronism", popularized the term zeitgeber ("time giver") in the 1980s while appearing on morning TV news shows, and helped travellers with the Jet Lag Diet, and The Cure for Jet Lag by Lynne W. Scanlon and Ehret.

Ehret once created the world's largest spectrograph, a rainbow 100 feet (30 m) long, that was large enough to bathe many petri dishes of tetrahymena in each 100 pm of the color spectrum.

During World War II, Ehret served with the Army's 87th Infantry Division. He was decorated with the Purple Heart and Bronze Star.

Ehret died at his home in Grayslake, Illinois on February 24, 2007.
