= Grayslake, Illinois =

- Village
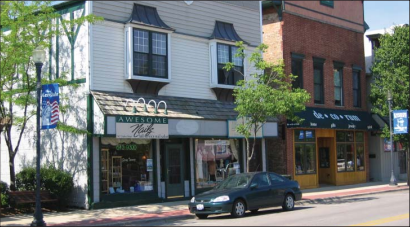
- Downtown Grayslake (2014)

- Flag Logo

- Location in Lake County and the state of Illinois
- Coordinates: 42°20′26″N 88°01′27″W
- Country: United States
- State: Illinois
- County: Lake County
- Settled: 1840
- Incorporated: 1895

Government
  - Mayor: Elizabeth Davies

Area
  - Total: 11.12 sq mi (28.81 km^{2})
  - Land: 10.90 sq mi (28.23 km^{2})
  - Water: 0.22 sq mi (0.58 km^{2})
- Elevation: 778 ft (237 m)

Population (2020)
  - Total: 21,248
  - Density: 1,949.3/sq mi (752.61/km^{2})
- Time zone: UTC-6 (CST)
  - Summer (DST): UTC-5 (CDT)
- ZIP code: 60030
- Area code(s): 847, 224
- FIPS code: 17-31121
- GNIS feature ID: 2398198
- Website: villageofgrayslake.com

Grayslake is a village in Lake County, Illinois, United States. The village's population at the 2020 census was 21,248. It is located in the Chicago metropolitan area, about 40 miles (64 km) north of Chicago's downtown, 14 miles (23 km) west of Lake Michigan, and 15 miles (24 km) south of the Wisconsin border.

Grayslake is home to the College of Lake County, Grayslake North High School, Grayslake Central High School, the University Center of Lake County and the Lake County Fairgrounds. At the south end of Grayslake, there are plans for a 641-acre (259 ha) development containing light industry, office space and residential space.

== History ==
=== Early history ===
In 1840, Massachusetts-born William M. Gray settled along the then-unnamed Grays Lake. Other farmers trickled into the area in 1840s. Gray moved to Waukegan in 1845.

In 1880, the Wisconsin Central Railroad built a line from Fond du Lac, Wisconsin, to Chicago that passed by the east side of Grays Lake. In 1886, the railroad built a station there, naming it Grayslake. The village incorporated in 1895.

== Geography ==
Grayslake is located in central Lake County. Neighboring communities include Libertyville, Mundelein, Round Lake Park, Hainesville, Round Lake Beach, Lindenhurst, Third Lake, Gages Lake and Wildwood. Grayslake is predominantly within the boundaries of Avon Township, with a small portion in Fremont Township.

According to the 2021 census gazetteer files, Grayslake has a total area of 11.13 square miles (28.83 km^{2}), of which 10.90 square miles (28.23 km^{2}) (or 97.98%) is land and 0.23 square miles (0.60 km^{2}) (or 2.02%) is water.

=== Lakes ===
Grays Lake is located in the center of the village and is bounded by Route 120, Lake Street, Harvey Avenue, and Alleghany Road.

Portions of Highland Lake (Illinois) are located within Grayslake.

=== Major streets ===
- U.S. Route 45
- Barron Boulevard/Ivanhoe Road
- Belvidere Road
- Buckley Road

== Demographics ==
Historical population
Census	Pop.	Note	%±
1900	416		—
1910	603		45.0%
1920	736		22.1%
1930	1,120		52.2%
1940	1,182		5.5%
1950	1,970		66.7%
1960	3,762		91.0%
1970	4,907		30.4%
1980	5,260		7.2%
1990	7,388		40.5%
2000	18,506		150.5%
2010	20,957		13.2%
2020	21,248		1.4%
U.S. Decennial Census; 2010 2020

=== Racial and ethnic composition ===
Grayslake village, Illinois – Racial and ethnic composition Note: the US Census treats Hispanic/Latino as an ethnic category. This table excludes Latinos from the racial categories and assigns them to a separate category. Hispanics/Latinos may be of any race.
Race / Ethnicity (NH = Non-Hispanic)	Pop 2000	Pop. 2010	Pop. 2020	% 2000	% 2010	% 2020
White alone (NH)	16,283	16,578	15,180	88.04%	79.10%	71.44%
Black or African American alone (NH)	288	667	920	1.56%	3.18%	4.33%
Native American or Alaska Native alone (NH)	29	35	21	0.16%	0.17%	0.10%
Asian alone (NH)	781	1,406	1,381	4.22%	6.71%	6.50%
Native Hawaiian or Pacific Islander alone (NH)	4	3	4	0.02%	0.01%	0.02%
Other race alone (NH)	15	34	86	0.08%	0.16%	0.40%
Mixed race or Multiracial (NH)	176	381	805	0.95%	1.82%	3.79%
Hispanic or Latino (any race)	920	1,853	2,851	4.97%	8.84%	13.42%
Total	18,506	20,957	21,248	100.00%	100.00%	100.00%

=== 2020 census ===
As of the 2020 census, Grayslake had a population of 21,248. The median age was 39.2 years. 23.7% of residents were under the age of 18 and 13.6% of residents were 65 years of age or older. For every 100 females there were 94.4 males, and for every 100 females age 18 and over there were 89.9 males age 18 and over.

99.7% of residents lived in urban areas, while 0.3% lived in rural areas.

There were 8,122 households in Grayslake, of which 35.1% had children under the age of 18 living in them. Of all households, 55.3% were married-couple households, 14.5% were households with a male householder and no spouse or partner present, and 24.5% were households with a female householder and no spouse or partner present. About 25.3% of all households were made up of individuals and 10.5% had someone living alone who was 65 years of age or older. There were 5,270 families residing in the village.

The population density was 1,909.76 inhabitants per square mile (737.36/km^{2}). There were 8,503 housing units at an average density of 764.25 per square mile (295.08/km^{2}). Of the housing units, 4.5% were vacant. The homeowner vacancy rate was 1.2% and the rental vacancy rate was 8.5%.

=== Income and poverty ===
The median income for a household in the village was $99,583, and the median income for a family was $121,577. Males had a median income of $65,965 versus $47,658 for females. The per capita income for the village was $46,346. About 4.8% of families and 7.7% of the population were below the poverty line, including 9.5% of those under age 18 and 10.2% of those age 65 or over.

== Transportation ==
Grayslake has two Metra lines providing rail service to downtown Chicago. A station in south Grayslake is used by the Milwaukee District North Line which provides service between Fox Lake and Union Station by way of Libertyville. Another station on Washington Street in north Grayslake is on the North Central Service which provides weekday service between Antioch and Union Station with a stop at O'Hare International Airport. Bus service is mainly served by Pace route 570 and the Round Lake On Demand service, although routes 565, 572, and 574 briefly enter the town to terminate at the College of Lake County campus in east Grayslake.

Four main traffic routes pass through Grayslake (Rte 120, Rte 45, Rte 83 and Washington Street) contributing to heavy traffic congestion during morning and afternoon rush hours.

Campbell Airport is a small, privately owned facility southwest of town.

For many years, there has been discussion about extending the Illinois Route 53 expressway north to Grayslake. It would end at another proposed expressway, the Illinois Route 120 bypass that would go from Gurnee to Volo. In a county-wide referendum in April 2009, 76% of voters voted in support of the extension.

== Public services ==
=== Police department ===
The Grayslake Police Department employs 31 full-time sworn police officers, seven part-time sworn police officers, and three non-sworn staff members that provide service to the residents of Grayslake and Hainesville. The Grayslake Police Department is fully accredited by the National Commission on Accreditation for Law Enforcement Agencies. All police dispatch is handed by the Public Safety Dispatch Center in Glenview, Illinois.

=== Fire protection district ===
The Grayslake Fire Protection District currently serves 25 square miles (65 km^{2}) in central Lake County, including the villages of Grayslake, Third Lake, Round Lake Park, and Round Lake Beach; Fremont Township; the unincorporated communities of Wildwood and Highland Lake; and the Census-designated place Gages Lake. The fire district has three fire stations, with the headquarters station located in downtown Grayslake. There are 39 career members and 20 part-time members. Career members include 27 firefighter-paramedics, three battalion chiefs, and nine lieutenants. The fire district is a member of Illinois's Mutual Aid Box Alarm System Division 4 serving Lake and McHenry Counties. Communications are handled through the Glenview Public Safety Dispatch Center offering Enhanced 911 service.

=== Finances ===
According to an April 2021 article in Forbes Magazine, Grayslake Village Manager Michael J. Ellis is the third highest-paid village or city manager in the state of Illinois, with an annual salary of $294,980.

=== Drinking water supply ===
The village's water supply comes from the Central Lake County Joint Action Water Agency (CLCJAWA) in Lake Bluff. CLCJAWA purifies water from Lake Michigan.

== Politics ==
=== State officials ===
- Laura Faver Dias (Democrat), State Representative
- Mary Edly-Allen (Democrat), State Senator

=== U.S. officials ===
- Brad Schneider (Democrat), U.S. Representative

== Education ==
Colleges

- College of Lake County (associate degrees)
- University Center of Lake County (bachelor and graduate degrees)

High schools

- Grayslake Central High School
- Grayslake North High School
- Lake County Vocational Center

Elementary schools

- Grayslake Middle School
- Park Campus K–8
- Frederick
- Meadowview
- Prairieview
- Avon
- Woodview
- Westlake Christian Academy K–12
- St. Gilbert (Catholic) School PK–8
- Prairie Crossing Charter School K–8

== Sports teams ==
Grayslake is home to AYSO region 396, a national soccer organization. The youth football team is the Colts. Grayslake Youth Lacrosse Association is the local youth lacrosse program. Central High School's teams are the Rams, and North High School's teams are the Knights. The high school ice hockey club is called Lakers Hockey (this club is a joint venture consisting of Grayslake Central, Grayslake North, Lakes, Antioch, and Grant).

Grayslake Youth Baseball Association (GYBA) is a volunteer organization in Lake County. It has girls' and boys' T-ball and baseball included. In 2008, the Grayslake Park District opened a new sports complex on Alleghany Road across from Campbell Airport. The facility includes five baseball/softball fields, tennis courts, a small recreational pond, numerous soccer fields and a concession stand.

== Recreation and amenities ==
Grayslake provides fishing, swimming, and boating opportunities in the summer and ice fishing, skating, and hockey in the winter. There are two public golf courses in Grayslake: Carillon, a nine-hole facility run by the Park District, and Brae Loch, a Lake County Forest Preserve course. There are numerous tennis courts run by the Park District, and both high schools feature over eight courts each, open to the public. Most neighborhoods have their own parks with recreational equipment.

On the north side of town is Rollins Savannah, a county forest preserve of 1,200 acres (4.9 km^{2}) with a bird observation deck, trails and walkways through wetlands. Immediately east of the old downtown district is Central Park, which contains many recreational facilities, including:

- The Esper A. Petersen Foundation Family Aquatic Center, opened in 2000. It features two water slides, recreational and lap swimming facilities.
- The Daniel Barry Skate park is located across from the aquatic facility and next to a community garden.
- Grayslake Library was moved to a brand new building in 1997. This larger facility, in addition to a book collection, features meeting rooms and computer/internet resources.
- Central Park has baseball and softball fields and a football/soccer/lacrosse field with lights for night games, a concession stand, a band shell, a playground with a water feature for small children. There is a bocce court and shuffleboard court, and there is a disc golf course in the woods throughout the entire park. This is all within a walking distance of the Grayslake Senior Center.

== Festivals and events ==
=== Grayslake Days ===
Grayslake Days generally takes place in mid-August for two days (Friday and Saturday) in the Municipal Parking Lot off Center Street in downtown Grayslake. This family music festival consists of music and fun activities for the whole family. The booths at the festival range from carnival games, to arts and crafts, beer and local food vendors. In addition, Grayslake days hosts the annual Bike and Pet Parade on the Saturday of the festival, usually from mid-morning to early afternoon. Children will decorate their bikes, and families will put their pets in their best costumes and parade them throughout the downtown area. The festival also hosts the "Grayslake's Got Talent" contest. The final parade of the festival, the Summer Days Parade, generally kicks off on Saturday evening.

=== Taste of Grayslake ===
Similar to Grayslake Days, Taste of Grayslake is held in late June (usually the weekend prior to Independence Day) in Grayslake's Central Park. This festival's primary purpose is to showcase all of the local food vendors Grayslake has to offer. In addition, Taste of Grayslake features live entertainment throughout the whole day of the festival. The festival also offers many kid friendly activities for the family including, but not limited to: face painting, balloon animals, various obstacle and climbing courses. The Taste closes with a fireworks show around dusk.

=== Grayslake Arts Festival ===
Grayslake's annual Arts Festival has been held for nearly two decades. Taking place in downtown Grayslake on Center Street every June, Grayslake offers arts and crafts from over 70 juried artists, and an art exhibit from the local high schools. The festival provides entertainment throughout the day, various local food vendors and activities for children.

== Notable people ==
- Tyler Blevins (better known as Ninja)
- Melinda Bush, state senator
- Steve Cohen (born 1955), Olympic judoka
- Robert E. Coulson, lawyer and politician
- Mike Ditka, National Football League player and coach of the Chicago Bears
- Charles Frederick Ehret, molecular biologist
- Sara Gruen, author of Water for Elephants
- Jay Hook, Major League Baseball player for several seasons
- Jo Jorgensen, Libertarian Party 2020 nominee for president
- Jim McMillen, guard 1923 Illinois Fighting Illini football team and Chicago Bears; former mayor of Antioch, Illinois
- Margaret Mary Ray, stalker of David Letterman and Story Musgrave
- David Schippers, lawyer
- Korbin Shrader, soccer player and 2024 Olympic gold medalist
- Sam Yingling, state representative

Bands

- Chevelle, alternative metal band
- Sworn In, metalcore band
- The Capricorns, an indietronica band

== See also ==
- List of villages in Illinois
