= Laura Faver Dias =

American politician in Illinois

Member of the Illinois House of Representatives from the 62nd district
- Incumbent
- Assumed office January 11, 2023
- Preceded by: Sam Yingling

Personal details
- Party: Democratic

Laura Faver Dias is an American politician serving as a member of the Illinois House of Representatives for the 62nd district.

Faver Dias was a member of the village board in Grayslake.
