= Grays Lake (Illinois) =

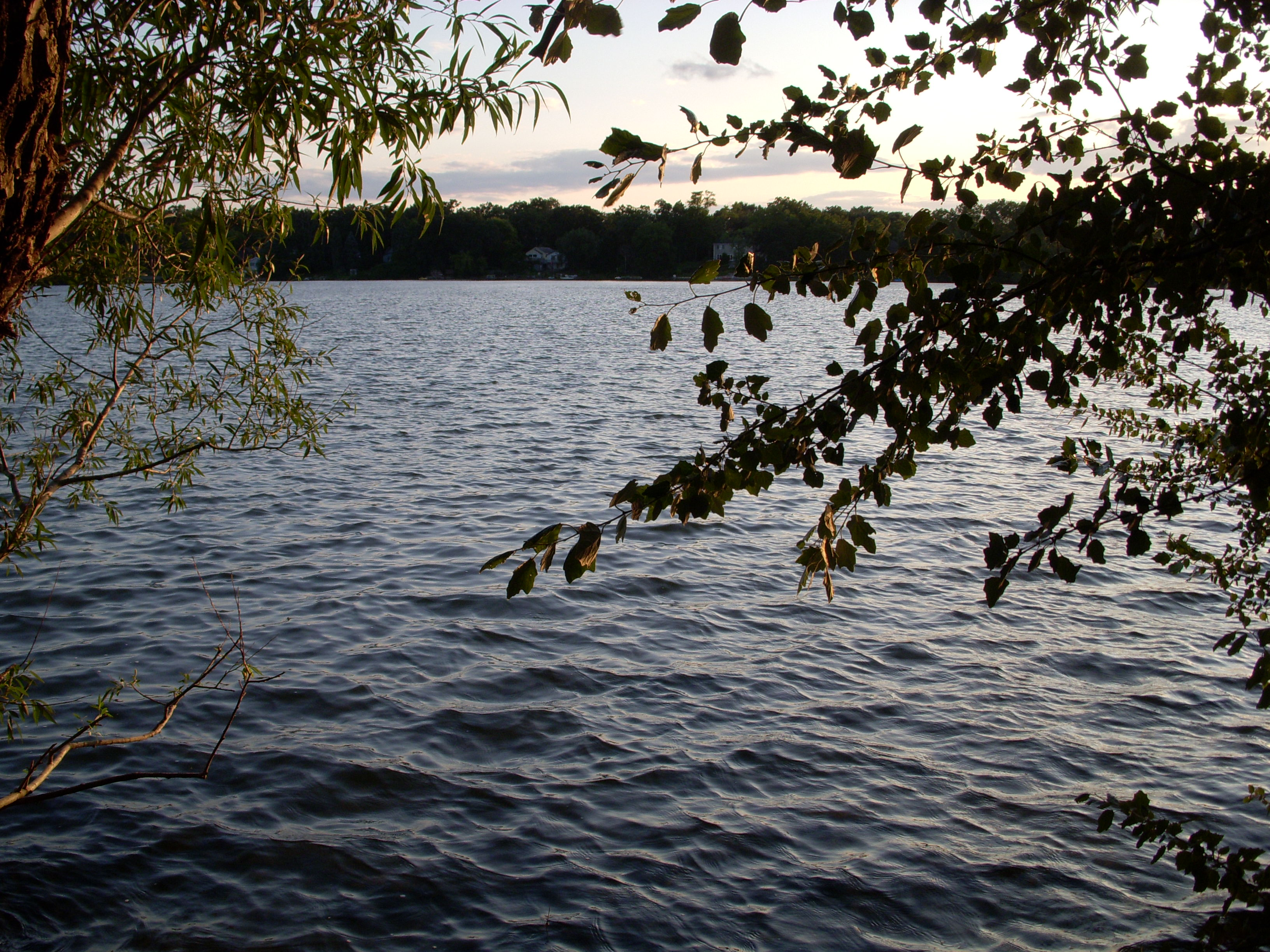

- Location within Illinois Location within the United States
- Location: Grayslake, Lake County, Illinois
- Coordinates: 42°20′28″N 88°02′42″W
- Lake type: kettle lake
- Basin countries: United States
- Max. length: 0.53 mi (0.85 km)
- Max. width: 0.3 mi (0.48 km)
- Surface area: 80 acres (32 ha)
- Average depth: 4 ft (1.2 m)
- Max. depth: 18 ft (5.5 m)
- Water volume: 112×10^{6} US gal (420,000 m^{3})
- Shore length^{1}: 2 mi (3.2 km)
- Surface elevation: 790 ft (240 m)
- ^{1} Shore length is not a well-defined measure.

Grays Lake is an 80-acre (32 ha) kettle lake located in the Village of Grayslake in Lake County, Illinois.

== Local regulations ==
Motorized watercraft are generally not allowed on the lake. Largemouth bass must be 15 inches long or longer to keep while northern pike must be 24 inches long or longer to keep. 2 line limit

== Statistics ==
Grays Lake contains approximately 112 million US gallons (420,000 m^{3}) of water covering approximately 80 acres (320,000 m^{2}). Water depth is approximately 18 feet (5.5 m) at its deepest point and averages 4 feet (1.2 m) deep. The lake is nearly 0.3 miles (0.48 km) wide and 0.53 miles (0.85 km) long with about 2 miles (3.2 km) of lake shore.

== Watershed ==
Grays Lake lies at the top of and drains into the Mill Creek, watershed. The Mill Creek watershed lies in the Des Plaines River watershed, which lies in the Illinois River watershed, which lies in the Mississippi River watershed, which drains into the Gulf of Mexico and eventually into the Atlantic Ocean.

== Fauna ==
Fish Largemouth bass, crappie, northern pike, yellow perch, sunfish, carp and catfish.

Mammals Fox, coyote, gray squirrel, chipmunk, raccoon, bat

Amphibians American bullfrog

Birds Turkey vulture, American robin, American goldfinch, blue heron, mallard duck, swan, dark-eyed junco, red-tailed hawk, Bald eagle

Reptiles Common snapping turtle

== Flora ==
Pickerel rush

== Jones Island ==
At the west end of the lake is a peninsula called Jones Island. This area, previously a marsh, was filled in to improve recreational opportunities.
