= Hainesville, Illinois =

- Village
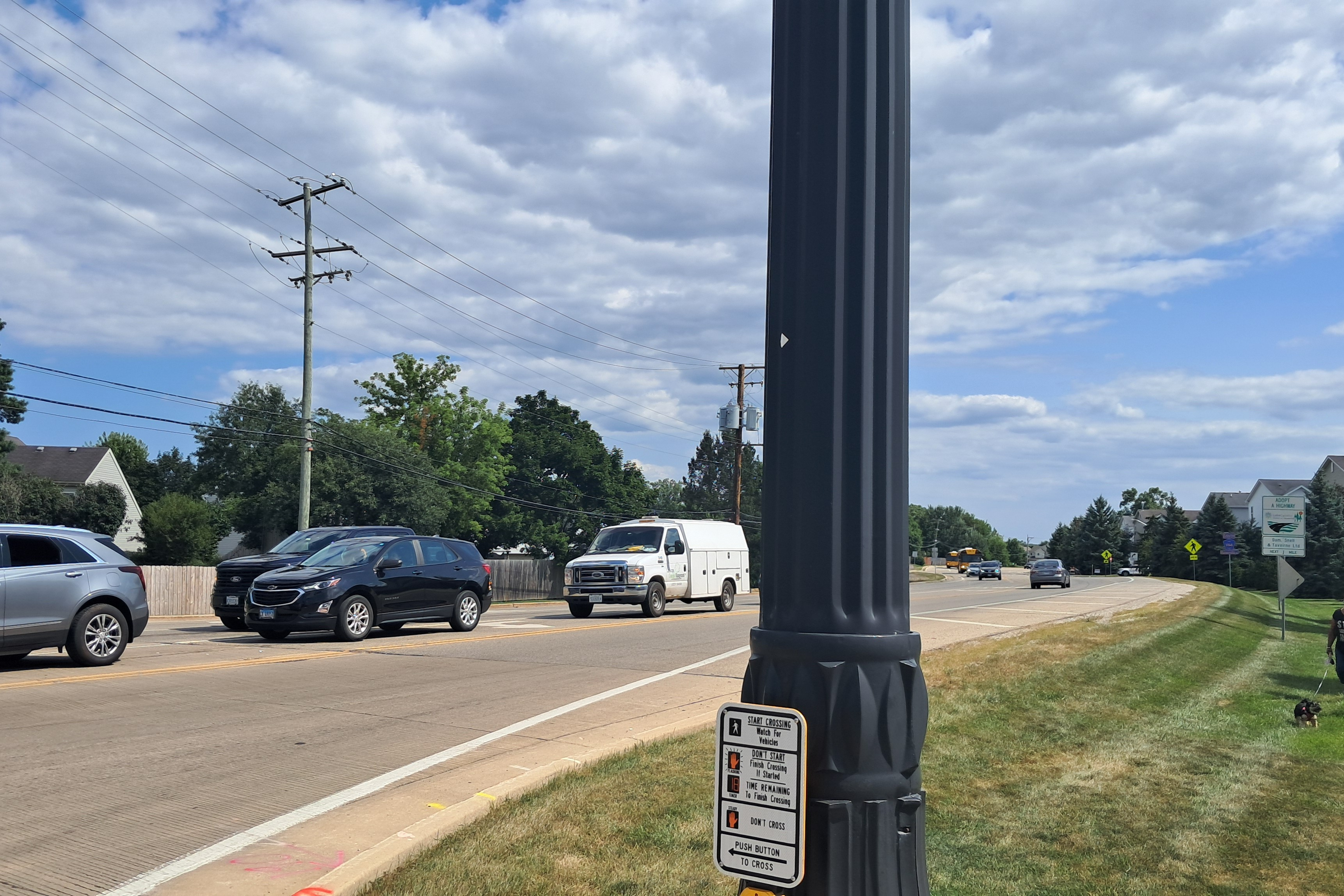
- Hainesville Road south from Washington Street

- Logo
- Motto: "Lake County's Oldest Village"
- Location of Hainesville in Lake County, Illinois.
- Coordinates: 42°20′29″N 88°04′07″W
- Country: United States
- State: Illinois
- County: Lake
- Township: Avon

Area
  - Total: 1.88 sq mi (4.87 km^{2})
  - Land: 1.85 sq mi (4.78 km^{2})
  - Water: 0.035 sq mi (0.09 km^{2})
- Elevation: 787 ft (240 m)

Population (2020)
  - Total: 3,546
  - Density: 1,920/sq mi (741.3/km^{2})
- Time zone: UTC-6 (CST)
  - Summer (DST): UTC-5 (CDT)
- ZIP Codes: 60030, 60073
- Area codes: 224, 847
- FIPS code: 17-32200
- GNIS feature ID: 2398222
- Website: www.hainesville.org

Hainesville is a village in Avon Township, Lake County, Illinois, United States. Per the 2020 census, the population was 3,546. Hainesville has the distinction of being the oldest incorporated community within Lake County.

== History ==
In 1838, a young boy named Elijah M. Haines (1822–1889) and his family moved from New York City to the Chicago area. In 1836, the young boy purchased a farm in Hainesville. During the winter of 1841–42, Haines taught school in Waukegan, Illinois (then known as Little Fort). In 1846, he surveyed and platted Hainesville. On February 26, 1847, the village incorporation papers were drafted. It is recorded that Elijah Haines met Abraham Lincoln in 1847. The two men met frequently and became well acquainted. It has been said that Lincoln spent the night in Hainesville a few times.

In 1848, construction began on the Lake and McHenry Plank Road. By 1851, the road was completed to Squaw Creek just west of Hainesville, and the settlement became the location for one of three toll houses.

In 1851, Haines was accepted to the bar, and a year later he moved to Waukegan. In 1859, he was sent to the state legislature where he served eight terms. He was a member of the Illinois Constitutional Convention of 1869-70 and is considered by some historians to have been its most influential member.

Hainesville was becoming a thriving village, but the village all but disappeared off the map until recent years. In 1899, the Milwaukee Road railroad expanded into Lake County, providing convenient transportation from the area into Chicago. Local land owner, general store proprietor and Hainesville postmaster George Battershall asked for a large sum of money to build a train station in Hainesville. Milwaukee Road had no other options in Hainesville as the railway entered and exited the village of Hainesville on Battershall's property (essentially everything south of the Plank Road in Hainesville). Amarias M. White, an early settler of what is now Round Lake, knowing that a railroad stop in Round Lake would spark commerce for his area, attracted the railroad company by offering the land for a depot for free. Commerce did start to move away from Hainesville and into Round Lake, as well as neighboring Grayslake.

The Hainesville post office closed in 1919. A few years later, the old wooden Hainesville School was destroyed by a tornado. In 1940, a new brick structure school was built near the Belvidere Road and Main Street split, but in 1945 the school became part of the Round Lake School system. In 1982, the building became Hainesville's village hall until 2005 when a new hall was built on Hainesville Road.

After several decades of being not much more than a handful of crossroads, Hainesville finally exploded into a sprawling suburban neighborhood. In 1990, large parcels of what was once farm land to the east of Hainesville Road and north of Belvidere Road were developed into Misty Hill Farm by U.S. Shelter Group. In 1994 Deerpoint Trails was built by Deer Point Homes. In 2000, land around the south side of the former cranberry bog appropriately named Cranberry Lake just east of Hainesville Road was developed into homes. In 2001, the former Softball City, a multi-use sports complex adjacent to the Avon Township Youth Baseball Organization facilities, sold its land to Ryland Homes, and this became the townhouse community called Union Square.

In 2002, Grayslake Community Consolidated School District (CCSD) 46 built the kindergarten to 4th grade Prairieview School on Belvidere Road. In 2003, the land to the north of Cranberry Lake, just south of Washington Street, was developed into a townhouse community called Cranberry Lake North.

Despite a census just being taken in 2000, a special census was requested in 2004 due to the explosive growth of the area. This census yielded a population totaling 3,444, up over 60% from what it was only four years prior.

== Geography ==
According to the 2021 census gazetteer files, Hainesville has a total area of 1.88 square miles (4.87 km^{2}), of which 1.85 square miles (4.79 km^{2}) (or 98.19%) is land and 0.03 square miles (0.08 km^{2}) (or 1.81%) is water.

=== Major streets ===
- Belvidere Road
- Main Street
- Washington Street
- Hainesville Road

== Demographics ==
Historical population
Census	Pop.	Note	%±
1880	103		—
1910	66		—
1920	84		27.3%
1930	81		−3.6%
1950	154		—
1960	132		−14.3%
1970	142		7.6%
1980	187		31.7%
1990	134		−28.3%
2000	2,129		1,488.8%
2010	3,597		69.0%
2020	3,546		−1.4%
U.S. Decennial Census; 2010 2020

=== Racial and ethnic composition ===
Hainesville village, Illinois – Racial and ethnic composition Note: the US Census treats Hispanic/Latino as an ethnic category. This table excludes Latinos from the racial categories and assigns them to a separate category. Hispanics/Latinos may be of any race.
Race / Ethnicity (NH = Non-Hispanic)	Pop 2000	Pop 2010	Pop 2020	% 2000	% 2010	% 2020
White alone (NH)	1,751	2,322	1,976	82.25%	64.55%	55.72%
Black or African American alone (NH)	31	140	193	1.46%	3.89%	5.44%
Native American or Alaska Native alone (NH)	2	11	6	0.09%	0.31%	0.17%
Asian alone (NH)	116	417	364	5.45%	11.59%	10.27%
Native Hawaiian or Pacific Islander alone (NH)	0	1	2	0.00%	0.03%	0.06%
Other race alone (NH)	1	9	18	0.05%	0.25%	0.51%
Mixed race or Multiracial (NH)	30	91	129	1.41%	2.53%	3.64%
Hispanic or Latino (any race)	198	606	858	9.30%	16.85%	24.20%
Total	2,129	3,597	3,546	100.00%	100.00%	100.00%

As of the 2020 census, Hainesville had a population of 3,546. The median age was 37.7 years. 22.8% of residents were under the age of 18 and 7.8% of residents were 65 years of age or older. For every 100 females there were 99.0 males, and for every 100 females age 18 and over there were 97.3 males age 18 and over.

99.7% of residents lived in urban areas, while 0.3% lived in rural areas.

The population density was 1,885.17 inhabitants per square mile (727.87/km^{2}), and the housing unit density was 701.75 per square mile (270.95/km^{2}).

There were 1,287 households in Hainesville, of which 39.9% had children under the age of 18 living in them. Of all households, 56.6% were married-couple households, 15.5% were households with a male householder and no spouse or partner present, and 20.5% were households with a female householder and no spouse or partner present. About 20.2% of all households were made up of individuals and 3.5% had someone living alone who was 65 years of age or older.

Of 1,320 housing units, 2.5% were vacant. The homeowner vacancy rate was 1.7% and the rental vacancy rate was 0.4%.

=== Income and poverty ===
The median income for a household in the village was $92,396, and the median income for a family was $118,962. Males had a median income of $73,317 versus $40,773 for females. The per capita income for the village was $47,544. About 1.4% of families and 1.5% of the population were below the poverty line, including 0.0% of those under age 18 and 12.1% of those age 65 or over.

== Transportation ==
Pace provides bus service on Route 570 connecting Hainesville to Fox Lake, Grayslake and other destinations.
