= Round Lake, Illinois =

Round Lake, Illinois 60073
- Village
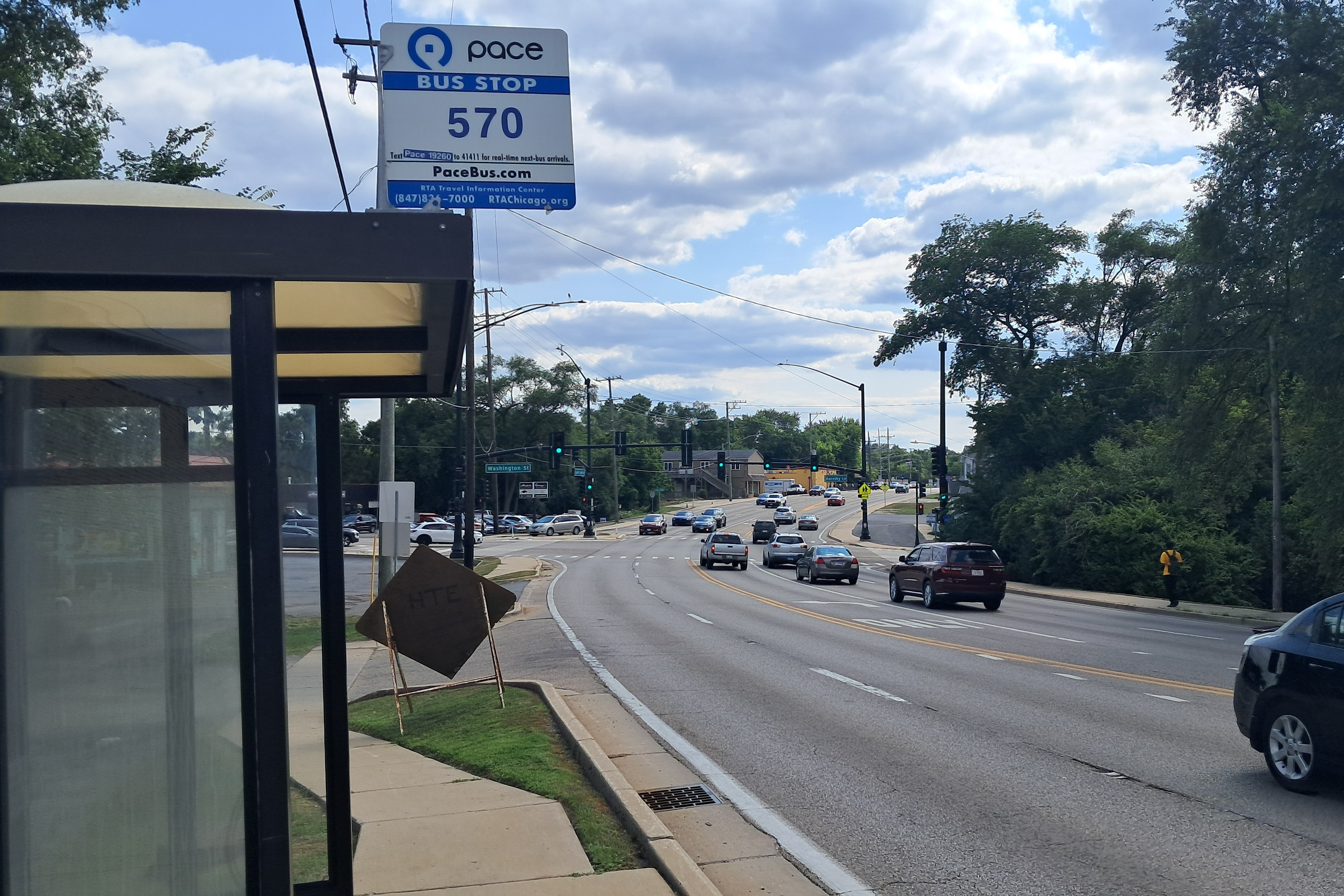
- Cedar Lake Road approaching Washington Street

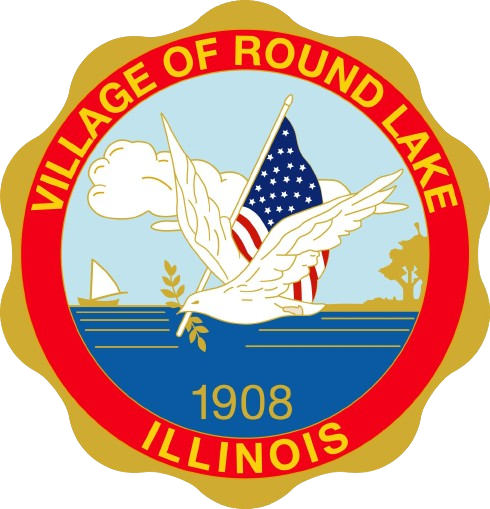
- Seal

- Location of Round Lake in Lake County, Illinois.
- Coordinates: 42°21′15″N 88°06′02″W
- Country: United States
- State: Illinois
- County: Lake County
- Townships: Avon, Grant and Fremont
- Founded: 1908
- Founder: Amarias M. White

Government
  - Mayor: Brian Brubaker

Area
  - Total: 5.72 sq mi (14.81 km^{2})
  - Land: 5.56 sq mi (14.40 km^{2})
  - Water: 0.16 sq mi (0.41 km^{2})
- Elevation: 778 ft (237 m)

Population (2020)
  - Total: 18,721
  - Density: 3,367.3/sq mi (1,300.14/km^{2})
- Demonym: Round Laker
- Time zone: UTC-6 (CST)
  - Summer (DST): UTC-5 (CDT)
- ZIP code: 60073
- Area codes: 224, 847
- FIPS code: 17-66027
- GNIS feature ID: 2399131
- Website: roundlakeil.gov

Round Lake is a northern suburb of Chicago in Lake County, Illinois, United States. Per the 2020 census, the population was 18,721.

== History ==
While the retreating Wisconsin glacier left an attractive environment for farmers who entered western Lake County after the Black Hawk War of 1832, the numerous lakes and wet prairies there prevented easy movement to agricultural markets. Farmers traded at stagecoach trail communities such as Hainesville, often exchanging dairy products and eggs for what they could not craft on the farm.

In the 1890s, when officials of the Chicago, Milwaukee & St. Paul Railroad extended a branch line from their Milwaukee–Chicago main line at Libertyville Junction (later Rondout) to Janesville, Wisconsin, western Lake County farmers gained easy access to Chicago.

Landowners near Hainesville such as Amarias M. White knew that a railroad station would increase property values. In a classic ploy, White offered the railroad free land in exchange for a station. He also drew up a town plat to show railroad officials that profitable traffic would come through his station site. White succeeded, and Round Lake, named after the nearby lake, not Hainesville, whose inhabitants failed to offer the railroad anything, became the area station on the "Milwaukee Road".

White's promise came true in 1901 when the Armour Company decided to harvest ice from Round Lake for their refrigerator car operations. They erected a massive ice storage building holding over 100,000 tons for shipment in spring and summer months.

In 1908 White and his partners acted to incorporate the station area. The proposed village population was too small to meet incorporation requirements, so area farmers were included in the village with the understanding that, once incorporation was successful, their farms would be disconnected. On January 7, 1909, Round Lake incorporated with White as village president. Soon after, those farmers who wished to disconnect were allowed to do so—an act which prevented present-day residents of the village from having any public access to their namesake lake.

A fire in 1917 destroyed the Armour operation in the village, although a dormitory housing winter ice cutters survived. Noticing vacation resorts which had sprung up around the lake, the Armour Company remodeled its dormitory into a rural summer retreat for company employees. The praise showered on the Round Lake environment by them helped bring a slow trickle of nonagricultural residential growth to the village.

With post–World War II expansion into the suburbs, Round Lake's Armour-era reputation as a rural refuge acted as a magnet for development. People began moving into the unincorporated area around the lake and demanding municipal services. The village of Round Lake failed to make those annexations. As a result, new communities, using the words "Round Lake" in their corporate titles, arose. This resulted in a duplication of political hierarchies and village services which still exists.

Since the 1970s, Round Lake has embarked on an expansive annexation program. With ongoing development of those areas, Round Lake was expected to continue to grow.

Between 2000 and 2010, the village grew by 213.1%, from 5,842 to 18,289. The population growth stalled heavily in the 2010s, and Round Lake's population in 2020 was 18,721.

== Geography ==
Round Lake is located approximately 55 miles northwest of Chicago's Loop.

According to the 2021 census gazetteer files, Round Lake has a total area of 5.72 square miles (14.81 km^{2}), of which 5.56 square miles (14.40 km^{2}) (or 97.20%) is land and 0.16 square miles (0.41 km^{2}) (or 2.80%) is water.

== Lakes ==
Round Lake is located in the northeast corner of the village and is bounded by Lakeview Drive and Lake Shore Drive.

=== Major streets ===
- Belvidere Road
- Big Hollow Road

=== Surrounding areas ===
Round Lake Beach
Long Lake Round Lake Park
Lakemoor Hainesville
Volo Mundelein
Wauconda

== Demographics ==
Historical population
Census	Pop.	Note	%±
1910	182		—
1920	251		37.9%
1930	338		34.7%
1940	359		6.2%
1950	573		59.6%
1960	997		74.0%
1970	1,531		53.6%
1980	3,175		107.4%
1990	3,550		11.8%
2000	5,842		64.6%
2010	18,289		213.1%
2020	18,721		2.4%
U.S. Decennial Census; 2010 2020

=== Racial and ethnic composition ===
Round Lake village, Illinois – Racial and ethnic composition Note: the US Census treats Hispanic/Latino as an ethnic category. This table excludes Latinos from the racial categories and assigns them to a separate category. Hispanics/Latinos may be of any race.
Race / Ethnicity (NH = Non-Hispanic)	Pop 2000	Pop 2010	Pop 2020	% 2000	% 2010	% 2020
White alone (NH)	4,217	10,066	8,909	72.18%	55.04%	47.59%
Black or African American alone (NH)	116	828	1,142	1.99%	4.53%	6.10%
Native American or Alaska Native alone (NH)	12	27	20	0.21%	0.15%	0.11%
Asian alone (NH)	112	2,310	1,925	1.92%	12.63%	10.28%
Native Hawaiian or Pacific Islander alone (NH)	2	12	10	0.03%	0.07%	0.05%
Other race alone (NH)	2	29	62	0.03%	0.16%	0.33%
Mixed race or Multiracial (NH)	89	386	755	1.52%	2.11%	4.03%
Hispanic or Latino (any race)	1,292	4,631	5,898	22.12%	25.32%	31.50%
Total	5,842	18,289	18,721	100.00%	100.00%	100.00%

=== 2020 census ===
As of the 2020 census, Round Lake had a population of 18,721, with 6,072 households and 4,525 families. The population density was 3,272.90 inhabitants per square mile (1,263.67/km^{2}). There were 6,269 housing units at an average density of 1,095.98 per square mile (423.16/km^{2}).

The median age was 35.1 years. 28.4% of residents were under the age of 18 and 8.1% were 65 years of age or older. For every 100 females there were 97.2 males, and for every 100 females age 18 and over there were 93.9 males age 18 and over.

99.5% of residents lived in urban areas, while 0.5% lived in rural areas.

Of the 6,072 households, 45.4% had children under the age of 18 living in them. Of all households, 58.6% were married-couple households, 13.1% were households with a male householder and no spouse or partner present, and 21.4% were households with a female householder and no spouse or partner present. About 17.8% of all households were made up of individuals, and 5.2% had someone living alone who was 65 years of age or older.

Of the village's housing units, 3.1% were vacant. The homeowner vacancy rate was 1.9% and the rental vacancy rate was 3.3%.

=== Income and poverty ===
The median income for a household in the village was $82,550, and the median income for a family was $96,598. Males had a median income of $50,988 versus $32,450 for females. The per capita income for the village was $33,471. About 6.9% of families and 8.7% of the population were below the poverty line, including 9.8% of those under age 18 and 19.1% of those age 65 or over.

== Education ==
Round Lake students attend school in one of the Nine Schools ran by Round Lake School District 116 or schools in Grayslake.

The Roman Catholic Archdiocese of Chicago operated a Catholic school in Round Lake Called St. Joseph, but the archdiocese decided to close the school after spring 2020.

== Transportation ==
The Round Lake station provides Metra commuter rail service along the Milwaukee District North Line. Trains connect Round Lake to Chicago Union Station, Fox Lake station and points in between.

Pace provides bus service on Route 570 connecting Round Lake to Fox Lake, Grayslake, and other destinations.

== Notable people ==
- Clay Guida (1981― ), UFC fighter; born in Round Lake
