= Round Lake Park, Illinois =

- Village
- Icon
- Motto(s): "Proud Past, Unlimited Future"
- Location of Round Lake Park in Lake County, Illinois.
- Coordinates: 42°18′32″N 88°04′44″W
- Country: United States
- State: Illinois
- County: Lake
- Townships: Avon, Fremont

Area
  - Total: 2.26 sq mi (5.85 km^{2})
  - Land: 2.07 sq mi (5.35 km^{2})
  - Water: 0.19 sq mi (0.50 km^{2})
- Elevation: 794 ft (242 m)

Population (2020)
  - Total: 7,680
  - Density: 3,721.3/sq mi (1,436.81/km^{2})
- Time zone: UTC-6 (CST)
  - Summer (DST): UTC-5 (CDT)
- ZIP code: 60073
- Area codes: 847 & 224
- FIPS code: 17-66066
- GNIS feature ID: 2399134
- Website: www.rlpil.us

Round Lake Park is a village in Lake County, Illinois, United States. Per the 2020 census, the population was 7,680. It is located along the south side of the lake, Round Lake.

== Geography ==
According to the 2021 census gazetteer files, Round Lake Park has a total area of 2.26 square miles (5.85 km^{2}), of which 2.06 square miles (5.34 km^{2}) (or 91.41%) is land and 0.19 square miles (0.49 km^{2}) (or 8.59%) is water.

=== Major streets ===
- Belvidere Road
- Main Street
- Washington Street
- Hainesville Road
- Peterson Road
- Alleghany Road

== Demographics ==
Historical population
Census	Pop.	Note	%±
1950	1,836		—
1960	2,565		39.7%
1970	3,148		22.7%
1980	4,032		28.1%
1990	4,045		0.3%
2000	6,038		49.3%
2010	7,505		24.3%
2020	7,680		2.3%
U.S. Decennial Census; 2010 2020

=== Racial and ethnic composition ===
Round Lake Park village, Illinois – Racial and ethnic composition Note: the US Census treats Hispanic/Latino as an ethnic category. This table excludes Latinos from the racial categories and assigns them to a separate category. Hispanics/Latinos may be of any race.
Race / Ethnicity (NH = Non-Hispanic)	Pop 2000	Pop 2010	Pop 2020	% 2000	% 2010	% 2020
White alone (NH)	4,245	4,189	3,607	70.30%	55.82%	46.97%
Black or African American alone (NH)	91	226	196	1.51%	3.01%	2.55%
Native American or Alaska Native alone (NH)	15	20	6	0.25%	0.27%	0.08%
Asian alone (NH)	32	82	69	0.53%	1.09%	0.90%
Native Hawaiian or Pacific Islander alone (NH)	1	1	5	0.02%	0.01%	0.07%
Other race alone (NH)	3	19	24	0.05%	0.25%	0.31%
Mixed race or Multiracial (NH)	67	69	147	1.11%	0.92%	1.91%
Hispanic or Latino (any race)	1,584	2,899	3,626	26.23%	38.63%	47.21%
Total	6,038	7,505	7,680	100.00%	100.00%	100.00%

=== 2020 census ===
As of the 2020 census, Round Lake Park had a population of 7,680. There were 3,101 households and 1,736 families residing in the village. The population density was 3,401.24 inhabitants per square mile (1,313.23/km^{2}), and there were 3,331 housing units at an average density of 1,475.20 per square mile (569.58/km^{2}).

The median age was 45.3 years. 20.2% of residents were under the age of 18 and 30.4% were 65 years of age or older. For every 100 females there were 92.7 males, and for every 100 females age 18 and over there were 88.3 males age 18 and over.

100.0% of residents lived in urban areas, while 0.0% lived in rural areas.

Of the 3,101 households, 24.2% had children under the age of 18 living in them. Of all households, 44.6% were married-couple households, 15.1% were households with a male householder and no spouse or partner present, and 34.0% were households with a female householder and no spouse or partner present. About 34.3% of all households were made up of individuals, and 26.8% had someone living alone who was 65 years of age or older. Of all housing units, 6.9% were vacant; the homeowner vacancy rate was 3.4% and the rental vacancy rate was 2.3%.

=== Income and poverty ===
The median income for a household in the village was $48,809, and the median income for a family was $58,081. Males had a median income of $34,798 versus $22,794 for females. The per capita income for the village was $23,560. About 6.5% of families and 9.7% of the population were below the poverty line, including 24.8% of those under age 18 and 1.5% of those age 65 or over.

== Transportation ==
Pace provides bus service on Route 570 connecting Round Lake Park to Fox Lake, Grayslake, and other destinations.
