= Round Lake Beach, Illinois =

Round Lake Beach
- Village
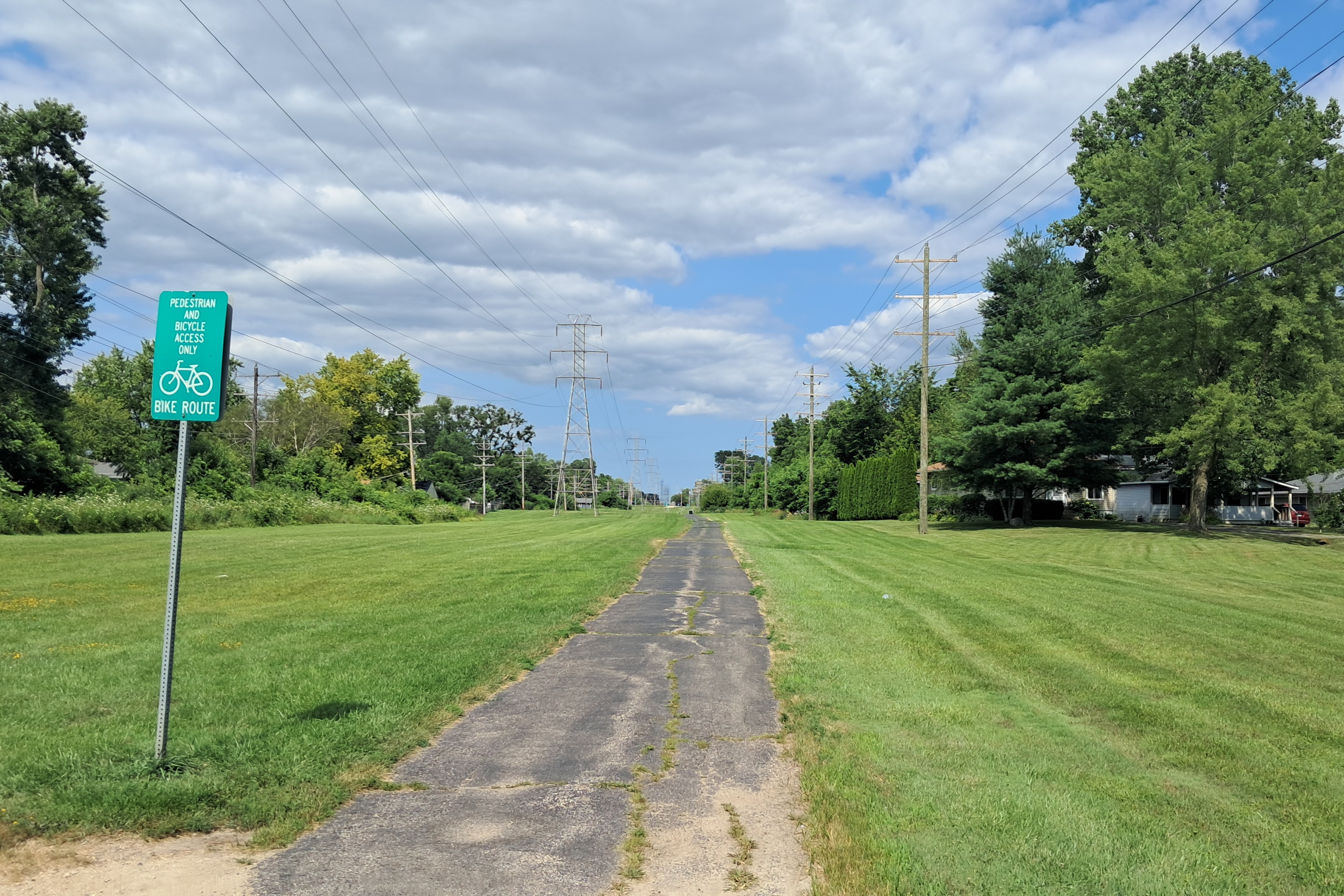
- Multi-use trail at Sunset Drive

- Flag Seal

- Location of Round Lake Beach in Lake County, Illinois.
- Coordinates: 42°22′32″N 88°05′10″W
- Country: United States
- State: Illinois
- County: Lake
- Townships: Avon, Lake Villa
- Incorporated: February 5, 1937

Area
  - Village: 5.20 sq mi (13.48 km^{2})
  - Land: 5.05 sq mi (13.07 km^{2})
  - Water: 0.16 sq mi (0.41 km^{2})
- Elevation: 814 ft (248 m)

Population (2020)
  - Village: 27,252
  - Density: 5,402.4/sq mi (2,085.87/km^{2})
  - Urban: 261,835 (US: 155th)
  - Urban density: 2,051.8/sq mi (792.2/km^{2})
- Time zone: UTC-6 (CST)
  - Summer (DST): UTC-5 (CDT)
- ZIP code: 60073
- Area codes: 847, 224
- FIPS code: 17-66040
- GNIS feature ID: 2399132
- Website: www.roundlakebeachil.gov

Round Lake Beach is a northern suburb of Chicago in Lake County, Illinois, United States. Per the 2020 census, the population was 27,252.

The United States Census Bureau defines an urban area of northwest Chicago-area suburbs that are separated from Chicago's urban area, with Round Lake Beach as the principal city: the Round Lake Beach–McHenry–Grayslake, IL–WI urban area had a population of 261,835 as of the 2020 census, making it the 155th largest in the United States. The village, along with the rest of the Round Lake area, has a significant Mexican population with many Latino businesses, restaurants, and shops throughout the town. Round Lake Beach has the second highest Latino population in Lake County, after nearby Waukegan.

== Geography ==
According to the 2021 census gazetteer files, Round Lake Beach has a total area of 5.20 square miles (13.47 km^{2}), of which 5.04 square miles (13.05 km^{2}) (or 96.96%) is land and 0.16 square miles (0.41 km^{2}) (or 3.04%) is water.

=== Major streets ===
- Monaville Road
- Fairfield Road
- Rollins Road
- Cedar Lake Road
- Hook Drive
- Hainesville Road

== Demographics ==
Historical population
Census	Pop.	Note	%±
1940	410		—
1950	1,892		361.5%
1960	5,011		164.9%
1970	5,717		14.1%
1980	12,921		126.0%
1990	16,434		27.2%
2000	25,859		57.4%
2010	28,175		9.0%
2020	27,252		−3.3%
U.S. Decennial Census; 2010 2020

=== Racial and ethnic composition ===
Round Lake Beach village, Illinois – Racial and ethnic composition Note: the US Census treats Hispanic/Latino as an ethnic category. This table excludes Latinos from the racial categories and assigns them to a separate category. Hispanics/Latinos may be of any race.
Race / Ethnicity (NH = Non-Hispanic)	Pop 2000	Pop 2010	Pop 2020	% 2000	% 2010	% 2020
White alone (NH)	16,057	12,212	9,111	62.09%	43.34%	33.43%
Black or African American alone (NH)	740	1,076	1,238	2.86%	3.82%	4.54%
Native American or Alaska Native alone (NH)	72	58	23	0.28%	0.21%	0.08%
Asian alone (NH)	518	838	806	2.00%	2.97%	2.96%
Native Hawaiian or Pacific Islander alone (NH)	4	7	18	0.02%	0.02%	0.07%
Other race alone (NH)	25	31	96	0.10%	0.11%	0.35%
Mixed race or Multiracial (NH)	359	423	802	1.39%	1.50%	2.94%
Hispanic or Latino (any race)	8,084	13,530	15,158	31.26%	48.02%	55.62%
Total	25,859	28,175	27,252	100.00%	100.00%	100.00%

=== 2020 census ===
As of the 2020 census, Round Lake Beach had a population of 27,252. The median age was 33.5 years. 27.1% of residents were under the age of 18 and 9.3% of residents were 65 years of age or older. For every 100 females there were 101.5 males, and for every 100 females age 18 and over there were 99.0 males age 18 and over.

100.0% of residents lived in urban areas, while 0.0% lived in rural areas.

There were 8,340 households in Round Lake Beach, of which 43.6% had children under the age of 18 living in them. Of all households, 53.6% were married-couple households, 15.2% were households with a male householder and no spouse or partner present, and 23.3% were households with a female householder and no spouse or partner present. About 18.7% of all households were made up of individuals and 7.1% had someone living alone who was 65 years of age or older.

There were 8,629 housing units, of which 3.3% were vacant. The homeowner vacancy rate was 1.2% and the rental vacancy rate was 4.0%.

=== Demographic estimates ===
Census Bureau profile estimates reported 6,523 families in the village, a population density of 5,238.75 inhabitants per square mile (2,022.69/km^{2}), and 8,629 housing units at an average density of 1,658.79 per square mile (640.46/km^{2}).

The same profile estimates reported that 23.28% of households were non-families, with an average household size of 3.71 and an average family size of 3.20.

In those estimates, 9.9% of residents were from 18 to 24, 29.4% were from 25 to 44, and 24.3% were from 45 to 64.

=== Income and poverty ===
The median income for a household in the village was $77,207, and the median income for a family was $90,392. Males had a median income of $41,846 versus $32,295 for females. The per capita income for the village was $27,939. About 4.1% of families and 6.5% of the population were below the poverty line, including 8.6% of those under age 18 and 5.2% of those age 65 or over.

== Transportation ==
Round Lake Beach has a station on Metra's North Central Service, which provides rail service between Antioch and Chicago Union Station Monday through Friday. The village of Round Lake Beach does approximately $3 to $4 million in infrastructure improvement per year using TIF and MFT funds.

Pace provides bus service on Route 570 connecting Round Lake Beach to Fox Lake, Grayslake, and other destinations.

== Notable person ==
- Tim Unroe (1970― ), first baseman for various teams; born in Round Lake Beach
