= Diamond Lake, Illinois =

- Unincorporated community
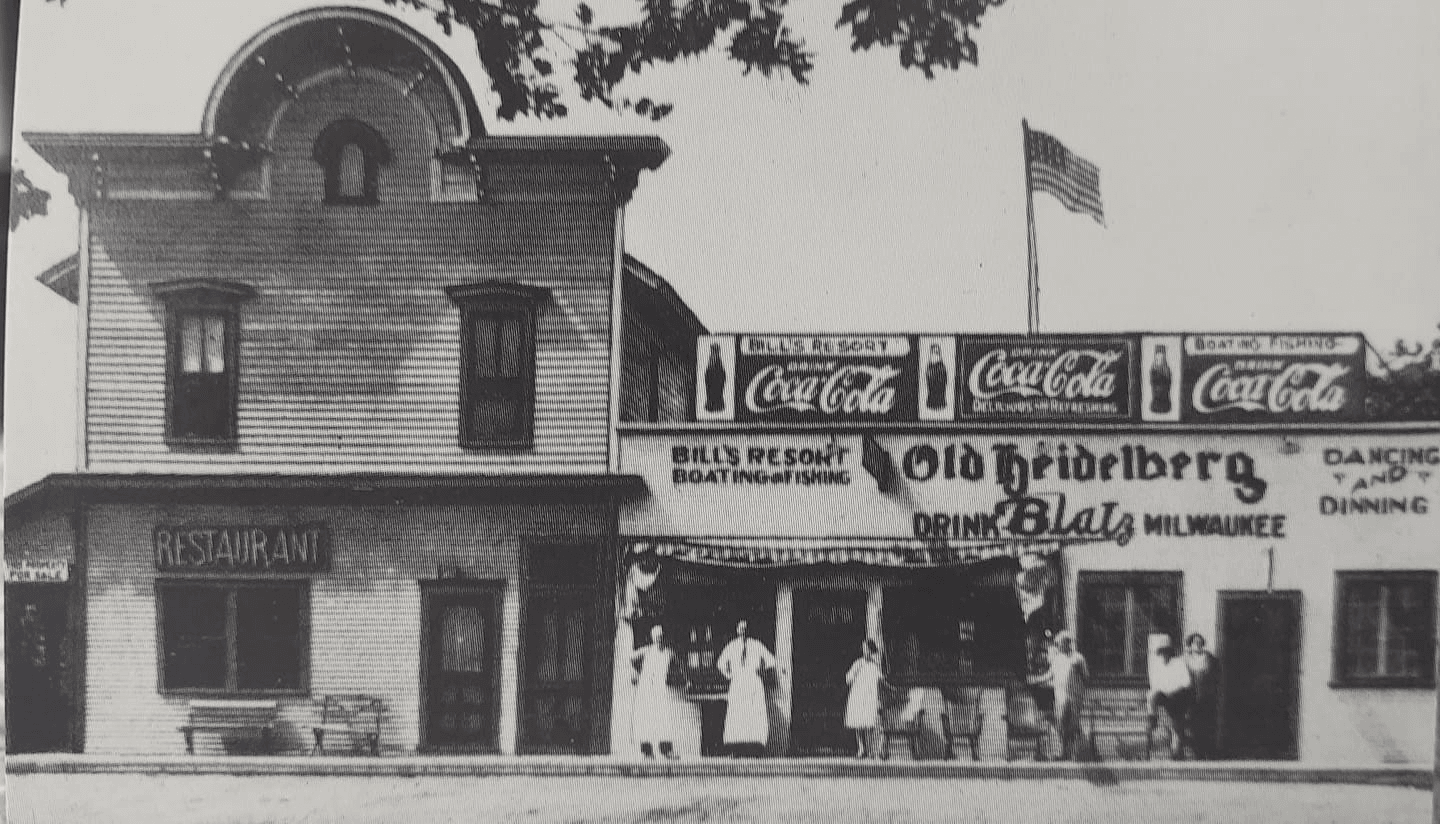
- Bill's Resort in Diamond Lake in 1926, which is now vacant land

- Location within Illinois Location within the United States
- Coordinates: 42°14′40″N 88°00′36″W
- Country: United States
- State: Illinois
- County: Lake
- Township: Fremont
- Elevation: 771 ft (235 m)
- Time zone: UTC-6 (Central (CST))
  - Summer (DST): UTC-5 (CDT)
- Area codes: 847 & 224
- GNIS feature ID: 407183

Diamond Lake is an unincorporated community in Lake County, Illinois, United States, surrounding the glacial lake of the same name. Diamond Lake is located along Illinois Route 60 and Illinois Route 83, north of Long Grove and south of Mundelein.

== History ==
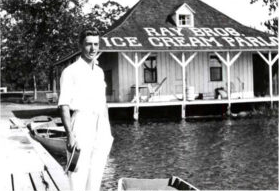
Ray Bros. Ice Cream Parlor in 1915

The area was previously settled by the Potawatomi people, including a camp on the south end of the lake. William Fenwick built the first house near the lake in 1835, and the first post office was established in Diamond Lake in 1855, which served the community until 1904. The community briefly joined into the village of Mundelein when the village incorporated in 1909 in order for Mundelein to meet the minimum residential requirements at the time, but Diamond Lake quickly withdrew afterwards. Housing developments of cottages surrounding the lake began in the mid-1920s on land that was previously farmland.

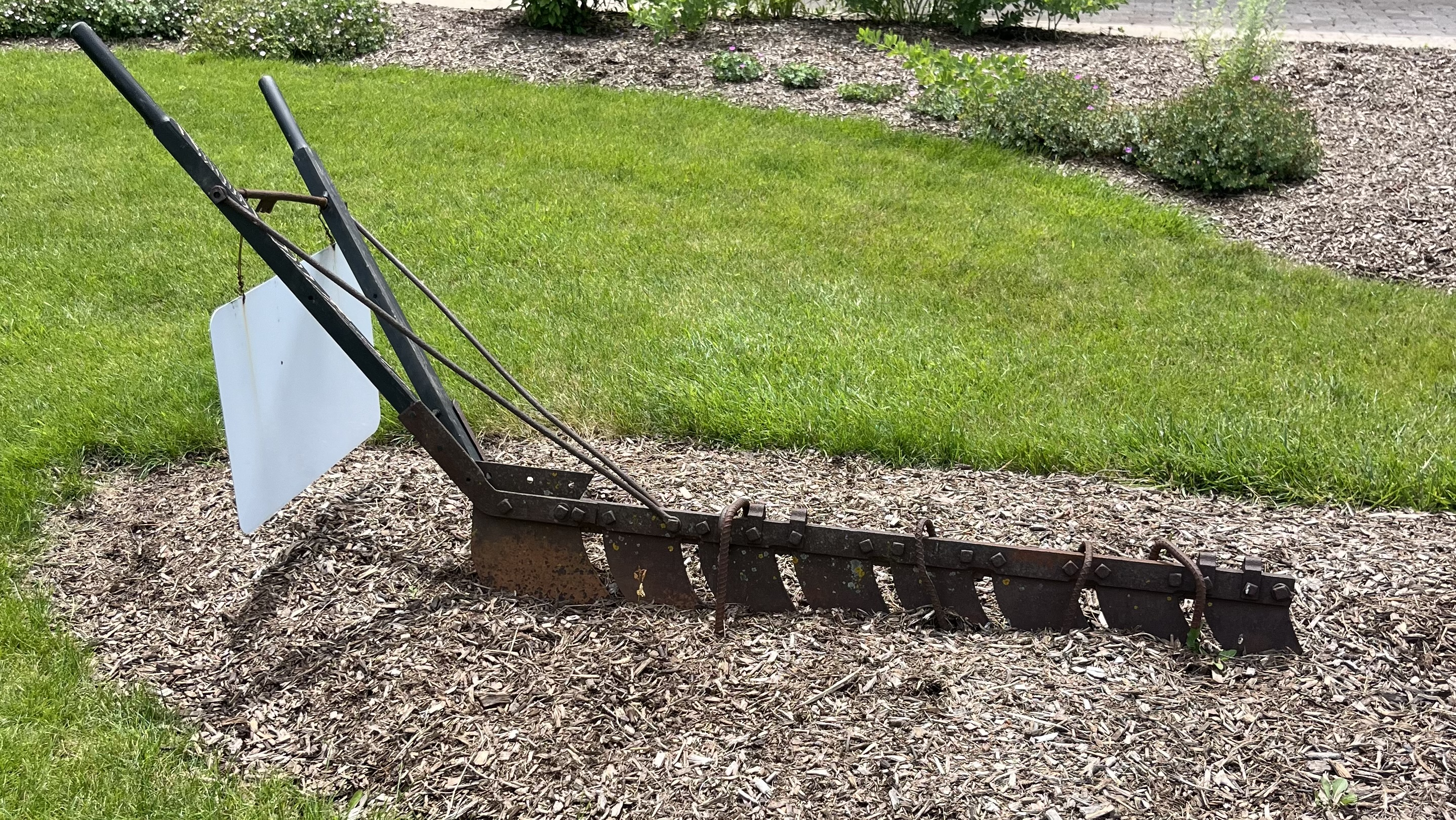
Ice cutter previously used in Diamond Lake

A resort and ice cream parlor once operated within the community named Lakeside Cottage Resort. The resort, located by the lake, started as a family farm owned the Ray family and included a dance pavilion and boat rentals. Jack Benny, Glenn Miller, and Lawrence Welk all performed as guests in the pavilion. The dance pavilion closed in 1946, and Lakeside Cottage Resort closed entirely in 1949. In the 1940s, summer cottages in the area were converted into year-round residences. Mundelein Park District purchased the land in 1965 for $22,000 and open a sports complex lake slough off the road of Illinois Route 83/60. A separate resort named Bill's Resort opened in 1915 and is currently vacant land next to a boat launch site.

Ice cutting was a prominent industry in the community until the widespread adoption of refrigeration in the 1940s. Ice was cut from the lake and encased in straw and sawdust, and sold for domestic or commercial use.

== Places ==
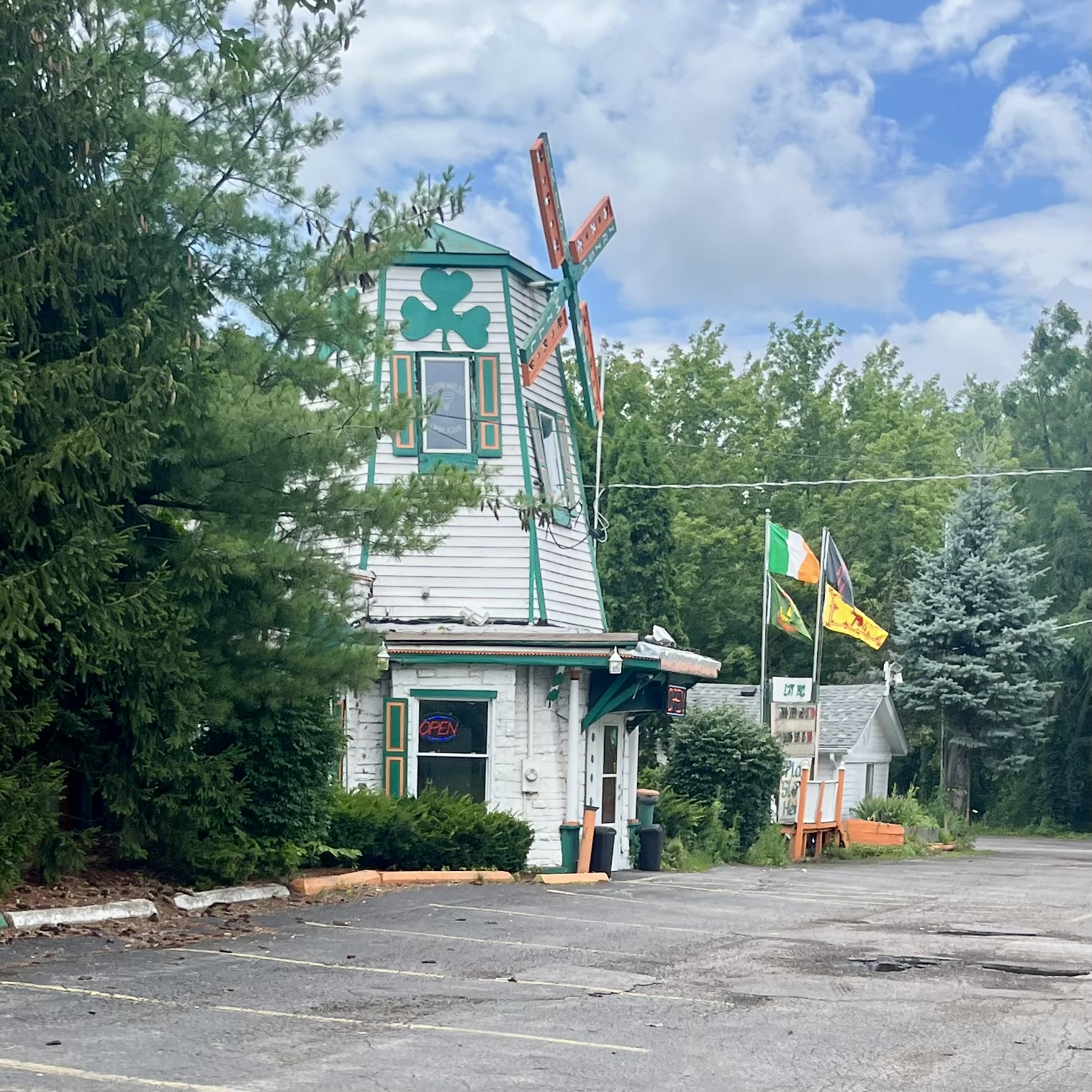
The Irish Mill Inn

=== The Irish Mill Inn ===
The Irish Mill Inn is a bar located in Diamond Lake on Illinois Route 83/60. Reports are conflicting on the opening of the bar—a newspaper listing says the establishment obtained its liquor license in 1933, however, township records state the bar was built in 1943. The bar was initially called the "Dutch Mill Tavern" but changed to its current name after an ownership change in 1973. After the ownership change, darts was introduced to the establishment and was described by The Daily Herald as "the dart headquarters for the Windy City and Northern Illinois dart leagues" in 2008.

=== Diamond Lake Church ===
Diamond Lake Church or Diamond Lake Methodist Church was organized in 1858 as a Methodist Episcopal Church, and a church building was built the same year. The church cost $696 to build. 1972 presidential candidate George McGovern served as a student pastor at the church.

== Education ==
Diamond Lake is served by Diamond Lake School District 76, which was established in 1847. The district is made up of Diamond Lake School, which teaches students from pre-kindergarten to second grade; West Oak Intermediate School, which teaches students from third grade to fifth grade; and West Oak Middle School, a middle school. West Oak Middle School is a feeder school into Mundelein High School.
