= Diamond Lake (Illinois) =

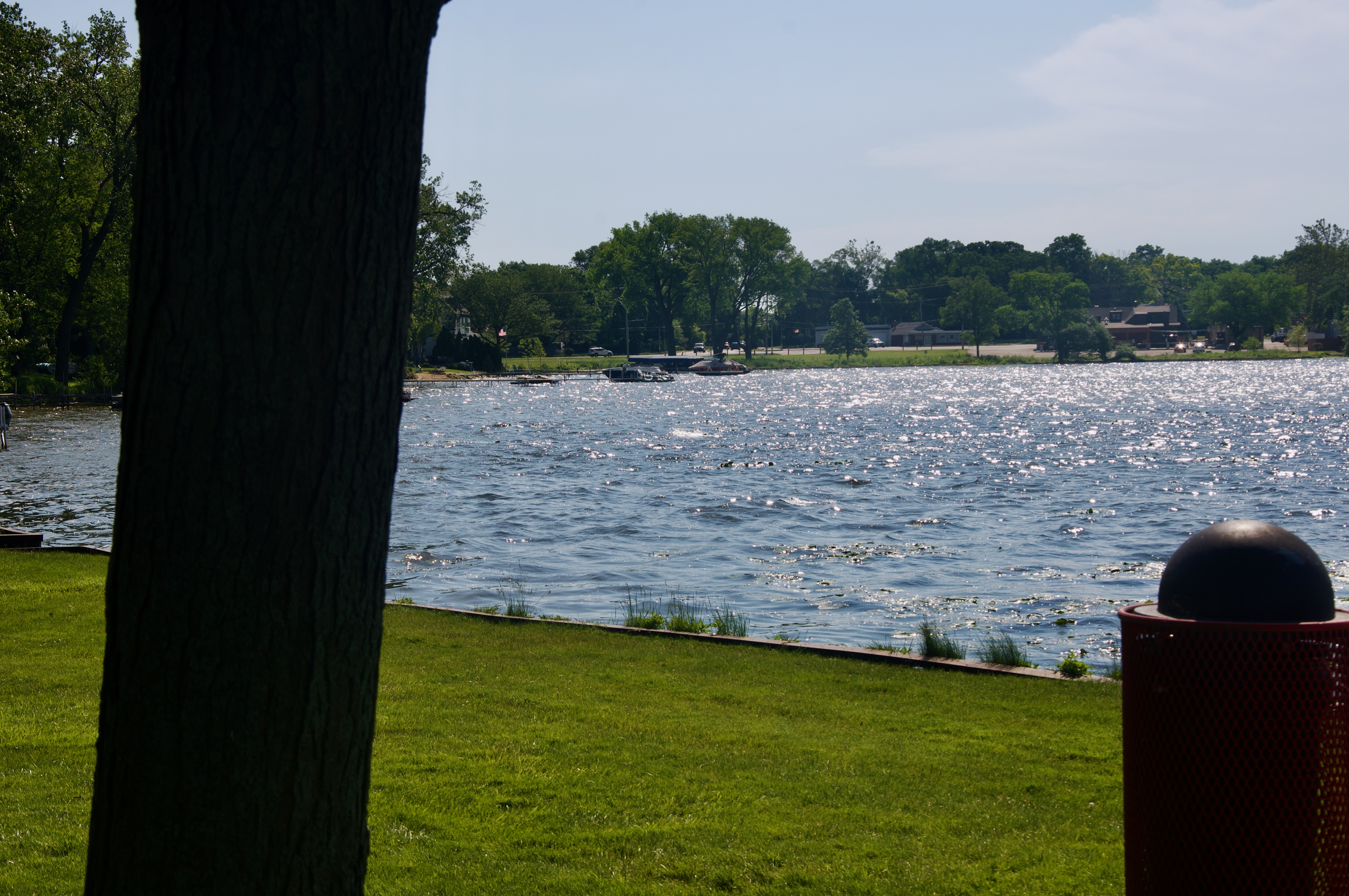
- Diamond Lake from Bob Lewandoski Park

- Location within Illinois
- Location: Mundelein, Illinois, US
- Coordinates: 42°15′04″N 88°00′23″W
- Type: glacial lake
- Basin countries: United States
- Surface area: 153-acre (62 ha)

Diamond Lake is a glacial-origin lake located in the village of Mundelein in northeastern Lake County, Illinois. Diamond Lake is a tourist attraction in northern Illinois, featuring both water sports in the summer and winter sports in the winter months.

== Geography ==
The lake has an average depth of around 7.61 feet (2.32 m), a maximum depth of 23 feet (7.0 m) a shoreline of 5.9 miles (9.5 km), and a surface area of 153 acres (62 ha). The lake's watershed contains about 686.16 acres (277.68 ha) of residential and agricultural land surrounding the lake. Diamond Lake's water is replenished by precipitation and runoff within its watershed. Water exits the lake via a drainage pipe that eventually connects to the Des Plaines River.

== History ==
Diamond Lake was carved by retreating glaciers about 14,000 years ago. That history is now on display through “Lost and Found Artifacts of Diamond Lake,” a special exhibit at the Mundelein Heritage Museum.

William Fenwick built the first lake-side house on the south bank of Diamond Lake, near present day Oak Terrace in 1835. According to oral history, Fenwick started the tradition of planting evergreen trees around the lake. In 1836, a massive 50-year settler migration began after Native Americans were required to leave Illinois. In 1840, Alexander Bilinski purchased north side land and builds his first store and taverns.

In the late 19th century, after being connected to the Wisconsin Central Railroad system, Diamond Lake became a tourist destination. Hotels and resorts began to open near the lake as a result of the increased demand. Hydropathic treatments were advertised as a form of hydrotherapy.

Ice cutting was a booming industry between 1900 to 1940, the advent of refrigeration. 12 inch thick blocks of ice from Diamond Lake would be sold to businesses in nearby Chicago. Ice would be stored until summer-time for use as needed.

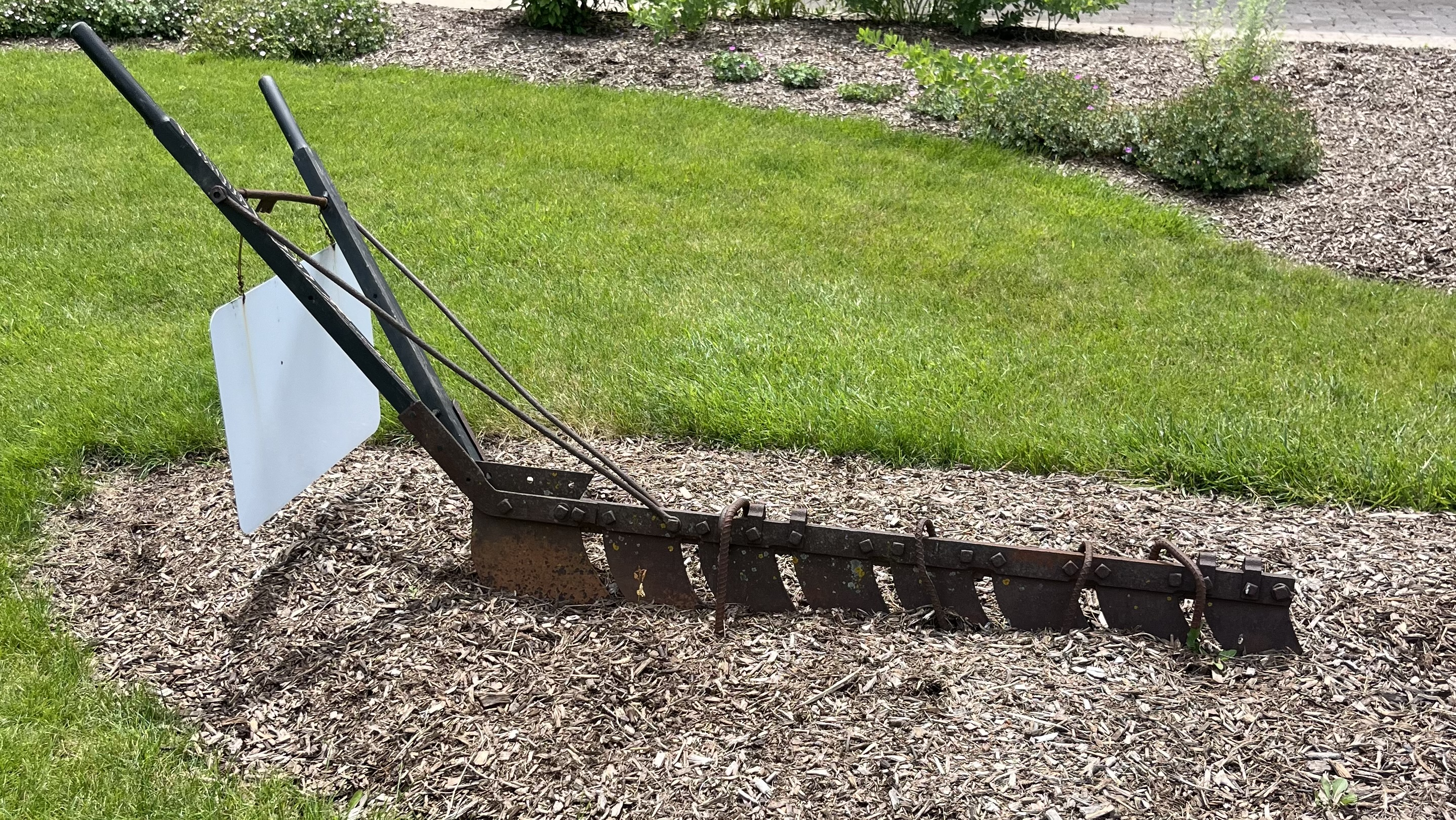
A horse drawn ice cutter previously used in Diamond Lake, at the Mundelein Historical Museum

In 1930, the lawyer Benjamin Miller defended the Ray family and other residents, then-owners of Diamond Lake, to keep it privately owned. Their lawsuit mentioned that Diamond Lake was not ideal for trade or navigation, leaving it no use to the public. The State of Illinois ruled that Diamond Lake would remain in private ownership.

In 1934, a severe drought caused Diamond Lake to reach its lowest level on record. Four years later, in 1937, floods caused the opposite, flooding the vicinity and requiring the use of rowboats to get around.

The Mundelein Park District gained ownership of the majority of the lake in the 1960s. By 1969, over 80% of Diamond Lake had been purchased for the sum of $23,000.

Today, Diamond Lake is the namesake of an unincorporated community based around the lake. As of 2026, Diamond Lake is actively undergoing improvements sponsored by the State of Illinois to upgrade its facilities and recreation options. Three acres of the lake are inside Bob Lewandoski Park.

== Recreation ==
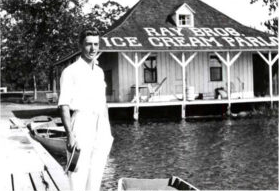
Ray Bros Ice Cream Parlor in 1915 on Diamond Lake

Diamond Lake features a resort named The Landing on Diamond Lake, renamed from Diamond Lake Beach in 2026. The resort offers a variety of water sports and activities, like kayaking, paddle boarding, and swimming. Non-water activities available near the lake include live music and food & drinks.

Winter sports like ice skating, ice fishing, and ice boating are popular in the winter months.

Fishing in the lake is allowed, but catch and release methods are encouraged; due to the stressors on the ecosystem, the Illinois Department of Natural Resources has had to introduce new fish manually in order to support the lake's habitat.

== Wildlife ==
Diamond Lake is home to several species of flora and fauna. The most common aquatic plants found in the lake include coontail, sago pondweed, and the invasive Eurasian watermilfoil and curly-leaf pondweed. In 2008, the following thirteen species of fish were identified in the lake: bluegill, pumpkinseed, largemouth bass, yellow bass, yellow perch, black crappie, walleye, northern pike, channel catfish, Eurasian carp, golden shiner, emerald shiner, and American gizzard shad.

In 2008, invasive zebra mussels were first sighted in Diamond Lake.

Common loons and American white pelicans can be sighted at the lake during their annual migrations. Canada geese, mallards, and great blue herons are common residents, and bald eagles are often seen flying over the lake. Muskrats, red foxes, and painted turtles also live in or around Diamond Lake.

Residents living near the lake founded the Diamond Lake Preservation Association in 2014. The group's mission is the maintain the health and usability of Diamond Lake by effectively managing its invasive species.
