= Mundelein Elementary School District 75 =

School district in Illinois, United States

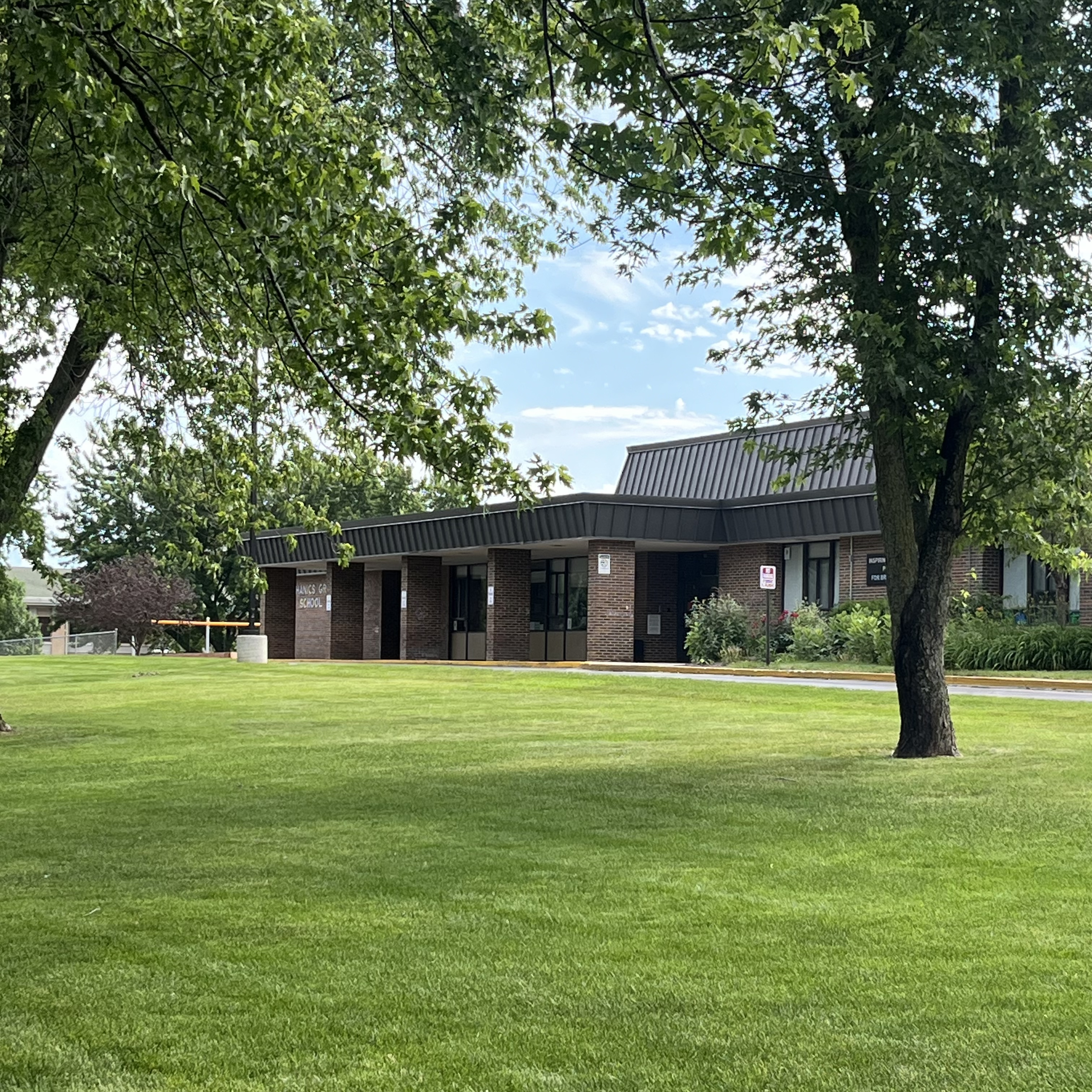
- Mechanics Grove Elementary School

Address
- 470 North Lake Street Mundelein, Illinois, 60060; United States

District information
- Grades: PreK-8
- Superintendent: Dr. Kevin Myers

Other information
- Website: Official website\

Mundelein Elementary School District 75 is an elementary school district based entirely in the western Lake County village of Mundelein, Illinois. The district is composed of three schools: an early learning center, an intermediate grade school, and a middle school. All schools are located in the village of Mundelein. Students in the district attend Washington Elementary School, which serves kindergarteners, first graders, and second graders under Principal Stephanie Drake. Students then proceed to Mechanics Grove Elementary School, which serves grades three through five and is led by Principal Tanya Fergus. Mechanics Grove then feeds into Carl Sandburg Middle School, which serves grades six through eight under Principal Mark Pilut. The district also hosts the Lincoln Early Childhood Center, a multi-district pre-kindergarten program. The district superintendent is Dr. Kevin Myers, who is also the superintendent of Mundelein Consolidated High School District 120.

== History ==
Lincoln Early Childhood Center opened in 1894. Originally known as Lincoln Elementary School, it contained only two classrooms. In 1938, a Gymnasium/cafeteria was added to the school. In the 1950s, an increase in enrollment led to the addition of an entire new floor of classrooms, a library, and a main office.

Previously, there was a Jefferson Elementary School which was incorporated into Carl Sandburg Middle School.

In 1979, Lincoln School closed due to low enrollment. It remained closed until the 1996–1997 school year when it was reopened and renovation due to increasing enrollment in the district. At that time, the school added a multi-purpose room. Lincoln School was the first school in the area and the only school in the district to run on an all year round schedule until the end of the 2005–2006 school year.

A kiln fire damaged Lincoln School on April 1, 2003, causing a week of closure and the movement of several classes to the multipurpose room. The fire completely destroyed the art room and damaged five other rooms. Rooms were renovated with carpeting, lighting and new lockers, and normal classes resumed by the start of the next school year.

The school hosted grade K-5 until the 2006–2007 school year. In the 2006–2007 school year, the school ended its year round schedule and Kindergarten and first grade classes moved to Washington School.

Then on February 16, 2011, school district 75 announced that it would close Lincoln School once again. The district had declining enrollment, and was facing financial difficulty due to the 2008 recession. The school closed following the 2010–2011 school year. Students and teachers in grades three, four and five moved to Mechanics Grove School. Second grade students and teachers moved to Washington School.

In 2015, Lincoln Elementary School was reopened as Lincoln Early Childhood Center, a pre-kindergarten program that is co-funded by District 75, Fremont School District 79 and Hawthorn Community Consolidated School District 73.
