= Ivanhoe, Illinois =

- Unincorporated community
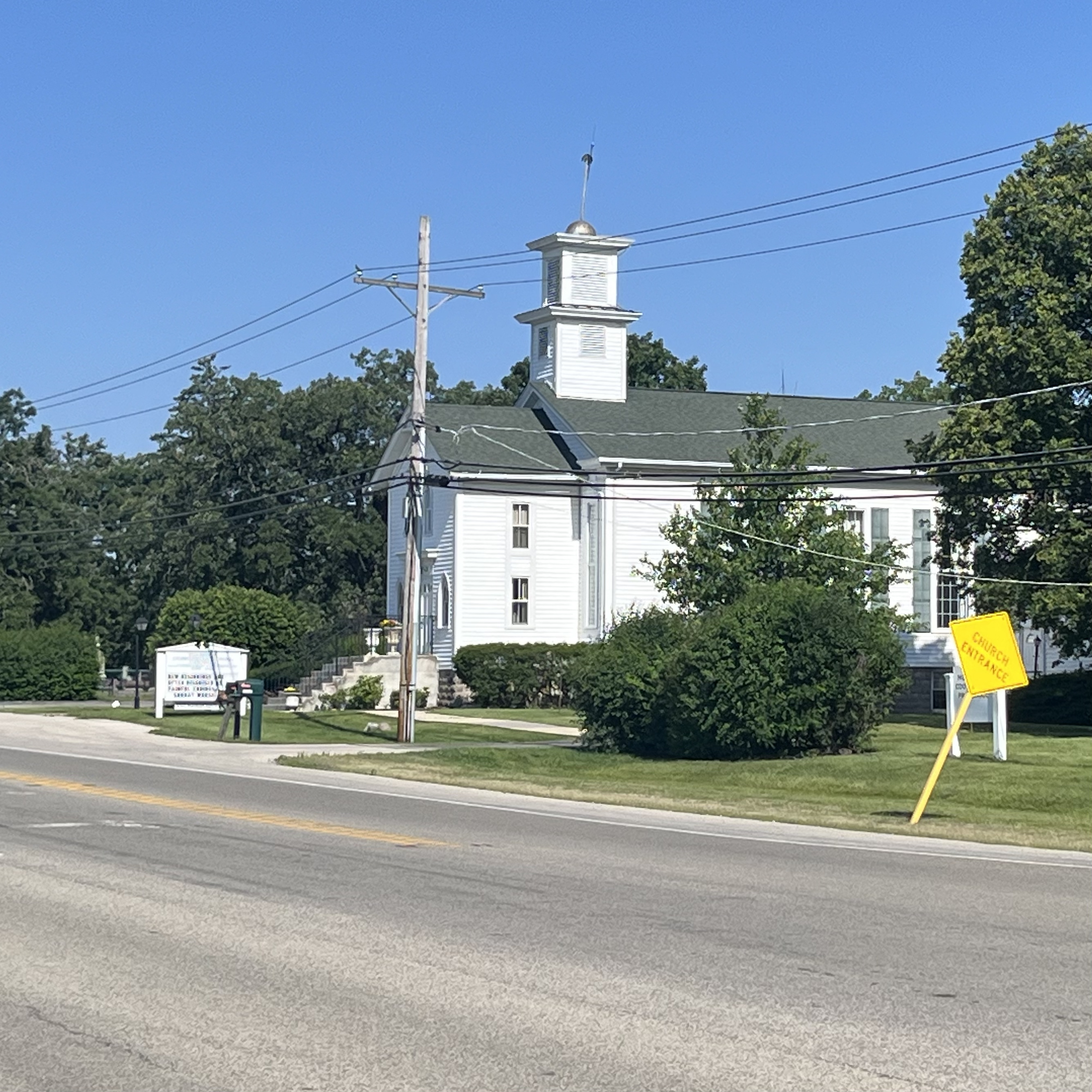
- Ivanhoe Congregational Church, a church in Ivanhoe

- Location within Illinois Location within the United States
- Coordinates: 42°16′44″N 88°02′31″W
- Country: United States
- State: Illinois
- County: Lake
- Township: Fremont
- Elevation: 846 ft (258 m)
- Time zone: UTC-6 (Central (CST))
  - Summer (DST): UTC-5 (CDT)
- Postal code: Postal code 60060
- Area codes: 847 & 224
- GNIS feature ID: 410977

Ivanhoe is a small, unincorporated community in Lake County, Illinois, United States, near Mundelein. It took its name from the 1820 novel Ivanhoe by Sir Walter Scott. The community was formerly known as Dean's Corners.

The community is home to a private golf course named the Ivanhoe Golf Club that hosted three PGA Web.com Tour events in 2017 through 2019. The course itself is also split into two private, gated communities, the Woods of Ivanhoe in addition to the Ivanhoe Estates.

Ivanhoe Congregational Church is located in the community. The church is the oldest organized church in Lake County, being founded on February 10, 1838 as a Presbyterian church in nearby Libertyville, and later reorganized into a Congregational Church in 1840. Initially, church services were held in log cabins, and would not have a house of worship until 1845. The congregation then moved to Ivanhoe in 1856, renaming itself to the "First Congregational Church of Fremont". The pastor of the church has claimed via circumstantial evidence of the church being a part of the Underground Railroad, although this claim has not been proven.
