= Ryan Borucki =

American baseball player (born 1994)

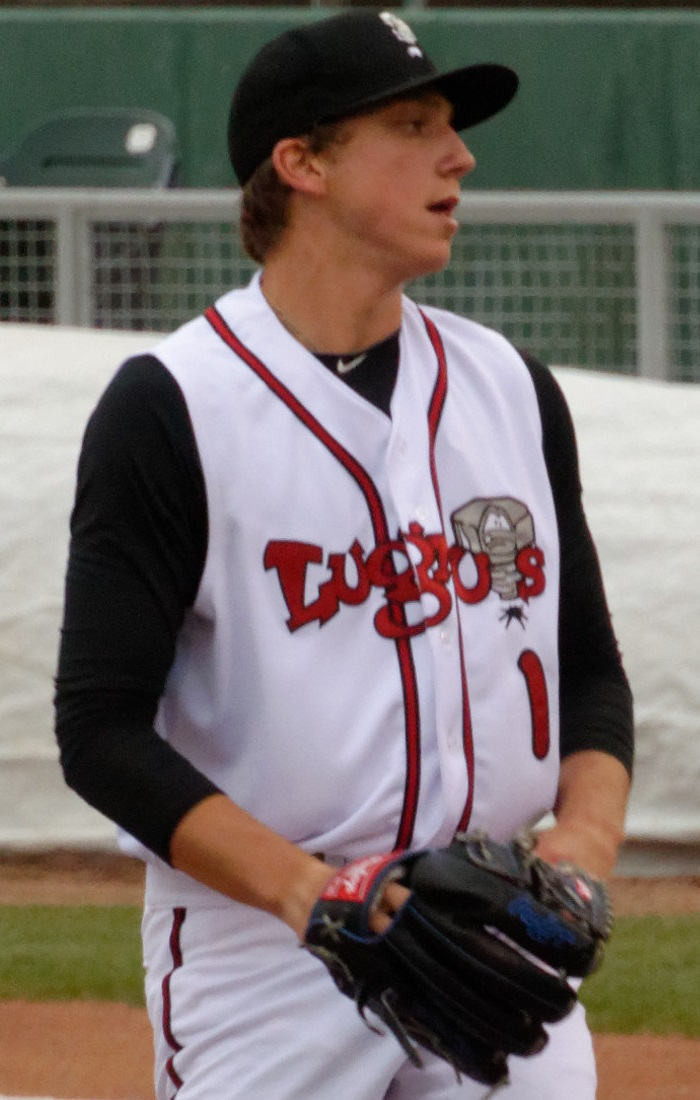
- Borucki with the Lansing Lugnuts in 2016

Free agent
- Pitcher
- Born: March 31, 1994 (age 32); Mundelein, Illinois, U.S.
- Bats: Left Throws: Left

MLB debut
- June 26, 2018, for the Toronto Blue Jays

MLB statistics (through 2026 season)
- Win–loss record: 16–13
- Earned run average: 4.34
- Strikeouts: 229
- Stats at Baseball Reference

Teams
- Toronto Blue Jays (2018–2022); Seattle Mariners (2022); Pittsburgh Pirates (2023–2025); Toronto Blue Jays (2025); San Francisco Giants (2026)

Ryan Joseph Borucki (born March 31, 1994) is an American professional baseball pitcher who is a free agent. He has previously played in Major League Baseball (MLB) for the Toronto Blue Jays, Seattle Mariners, Pittsburgh Pirates, and San Francisco Giants.

== High school ==
Borucki attended Mundelein High School in his hometown of Mundelein, Illinois. In his junior year, Borucki had a 7-1 record with a 1.20 ERA and 57 strikeouts, leading to all-conference, all-Lake County, and all-academic honors. He was considered the number one prospect in Illinois, according to Prep Baseball Report. Borucki did not pitch for much of his senior season due to a partially torn ulnar collateral ligament (UCL).

== Professional career ==
=== Toronto Blue Jays ===
==== Minor leagues ====
Borucki was selected by the Toronto Blue Jays in the 15th round of the 2012 Major League Baseball draft, and was signed away from his commitment with the University of Iowa with a bonus of $426,000. He was assigned to the Rookie-level Gulf Coast League Blue Jays, where he pitched six innings and posted a 1–0 record and a 3.00 ERA before undergoing Tommy John surgery to repair his UCL, which caused him to miss the entire 2013 season. In 2014, he pitched for the Rookie Advanced Bluefield Blue Jays and the Low-A Vancouver Canadians, and earned a combined record of 3–2, a 2.37 ERA, and 52 strikeouts in 57 innings pitched. Borucki made only three appearances in the 2015 season, posting an 0–1 record, 3.18 ERA, and seven strikeouts in 5 2/3 innings pitched. He was assigned to the High-A Dunedin Blue Jays to open the 2016 minor league season. Borucki struggled with Dunedin, posting a 14.40 ERA through six starts before being reassigned to the Single-A Lansing Lugnuts. He fared much better with Lansing, making 20 starts and posting a 10–4 record, 2.41 ERA, and 107 strikeouts. The Blue Jays added Borucki to their 40-man roster after the season to protect him from the Rule 5 draft.

Borucki was assigned to High-A Dunedin to begin the 2017 minor league season. After posting a 6–5 record, 3.58 ERA, and 109 strikeouts in 98 innings, he was promoted to the Double-A New Hampshire Fisher Cats. In seven starts with the Fisher Cats, Borucki went 2–3 with a 1.94 ERA and 42 strikeouts in 46 1/3. He made a single start with the Triple-A Buffalo Bisons before the season ended, going six scoreless innings. Borucki was named Toronto's Minor League Pitcher of the Year on October 5, 2017. He began the 2018 season with Buffalo, and through June 24, had posted a 6–5 record, 3.27 ERA, and 58 strikeouts in 77 innings pitched.

==== Major league ====
On June 26, 2018, the Blue Jays recalled Borucki from Buffalo. He made his Major League debut that night at Minute Maid Park against the Astros, taking a loss after allowing two runs on six hits over six innings with three strikeouts. Borucki became the twelfth pitcher in franchise history to throw at least six innings and allow two or fewer runs in his debut, and the first to do so since Zach Stewart in 2011. Borucki made his first start at Rogers Centre on July 2 against the Detroit Tigers, allowing two runs over seven innings with eight strikeouts, which tied him with Roy Halladay for the second-most strikeouts for a Blue Jays' pitcher in a home debut. On July 14, Borucki was optioned to the minors. He was recalled again on July 24. On August 3, Borucki earned his first major league win when he threw eight innings and allowed one unearned run in Toronto's 7–2 victory against the Seattle Mariners. Borucki finished the 2018 season with a 4–6 record and a 3.87 ERA over seventeen starts, eleven of which were quality starts, the most of any American League rookie that year. On December 5, the Toronto chapter of the Baseball Writers' Association of America voted Borucki the Blue Jays' Rookie of the Year for 2018.

Borucki missed the first half of the 2019 season after suffering from elbow inflammation, which was later identified as a bone spur, during spring training. He made his season debut on July 22, allowing four runs (two earned) and striking out three over 4 2/3 innings in a loss to Cleveland. After making two starts, Borucki returned to the injured list on July 31. On August 9, it was announced that he underwent surgery to remove bone spurs from his left arm and would miss the remainder of the season.

As the COVID-19-shortened 2020 Major League season began in late July, Borucki failed to make the Blue Jays' 30-man Opening Day roster. He was beat out by rookie Anthony Kay for the final spot in the team's starting rotation. However, he was soon activated on July 27 and added to the team's bullpen. He made his season debut that night, pitching 1 1/3 scoreless innings and earning the win against the Washington Nationals. With the 2020 Toronto Blue Jays, Borucki appeared in 21 games, compiling a 1–1 record with 2.70 ERA and 21 strikeouts in 16.2 innings pitched.

On July 6, 2021, Borucki was placed on the 60-day injured list with a left forearm flexor strain. Borucki was activated off of the injured list on July 16. On September 22, 2021, he intentionally hit Kevin Kiermaier of the Tampa Bay Rays on a pitch, clearing the benches. Borucki and pitching coach Pete Walker were ejected, and Borucki was suspended for three days. He appealed and his suspension was reduced to two games.

On March 22, 2022, Borucki signed a one-year, $825,000 contract with the Blue Jays, avoiding salary arbitration. He was designated for assignment on May 31.

=== Seattle Mariners ===
On June 4, 2022, Borucki was traded to the Seattle Mariners in exchange for minor leaguer Tyler Keenan. He made 21 appearances for Seattle, posting a 2–0 record and 4.26 ERA with 13 strikeouts in 19 innings pitched before he was placed on the injured list with a left forearm strain on August 8. He spent the rest of the season on the injured list and was removed from the 40-man roster and sent outright to the Triple-A Tacoma Rainiers following the season on November 9. However, he rejected the assignment and became a free agent.

=== Chicago Cubs ===
On January 4, 2023, Borucki signed a minor league contract with the Chicago Cubs. He was assigned to the Triple-A Iowa Cubs to begin the year, where he made 8 appearances and struggled to a 12.00 ERA with 11 strikeouts in nine innings pitched. On April 30, Borucki had his contract selected to the active roster. He did not appear in a game for Chicago, and was designated for assignment on May 2 following the promotion of Miguel Amaya. He cleared waivers and was sent outright to Triple-A Iowa on May 5. Two days later, Borucki rejected the outright assignment and elected free agency.

=== Pittsburgh Pirates ===
On May 11, 2023, Borucki signed a minor league contract with the Pittsburgh Pirates organization. In 8 appearances for the Triple-A Indianapolis Indians, he tossed 8 1/3 scoreless innings with 4 strikeouts. On June 18, the Pirates selected Borucki's contract, adding him to their active roster. He found immediate success in the Pirates' bullpen, finishing out the 2023 season with career bests in wins (4), ERA (2.45), and WHIP (0.744) across a career-high 38 appearances.

On November 9, 2023, Borucki agreed to a $1.6 million salary with the Pirates in 2024, avoiding arbitration. After four appearances in 2024, he was placed on the injured list with left triceps inflammation on April 7. On May 1, Borucki was shut down following a diagnosis of carpal tunnel syndrome, and he was transferred to the 60-day injured list on June 6. Borucki was activated on September 1. In 14 games for the Pirates, he struggled to a 7.36 ERA with 13 strikeouts over 11 innings.

On January 27, 2025, Borucki re-signed with the Pirates organization on a minor league contract. On March 27, the Pirates added Borucki to the team's Opening Day roster. In 35 appearances for Pittsburgh, he logged a 1–3 record and 5.28 ERA with 27 strikeouts across 30 2/3 innings pitched. On August 15, Borucki was designated for assignment by the Pirates. He was released by Pittsburgh after clearing waivers on August 18.

=== Toronto Blue Jays (second stint) ===
On August 25, 2025, Borucki signed a minor league contract with the Toronto Blue Jays. He made one scoreless appearance for the Triple-A Buffalo Bisons, allowing one hit and one walk across 1 2/3 innings pitched. On September 2, the Blue Jays selected Borucki's contract, adding him to their active roster. He made four scoreless appearances for Toronto, striking out five across 4 1/3 innings pitched. He was designated for assignment by the Blue Jays following the promotion of Trey Yesavage on September 15. He cleared waivers and was sent outright to Buffalo on September 18. Borucki elected free agency on November 2.

=== San Francisco Giants ===
On January 18, 2026, Borucki signed a minor league contract with the Chicago White Sox. He was released by the White Sox prior to the start of the regular season on March 20.

On March 21, 2026, Borucki signed a one-year, major league contract with the San Francisco Giants. In 21 appearances for San Francisco, he logged a 1−1 record and 4.94 ERA with 15 strikeouts across 23 2/3 innings pitched. Borucki was designated for assignment by the Giants on May 31. Borucki was released on June 6.

=== Cleveland Guardians ===
On July 31, 2026, Borucki signed a minor league contract with the Cleveland Guardians. In 13 games with Triple-A Columbus Clippers he threw 11.1 innings of relief going 0-0 with a 0.79 ERA and 10 strikeouts. He elected free agency on November 2.

== Personal life ==
Borucki's father, Raymond, was an infielder who signed with the Philadelphia Phillies as an undrafted free agent in 1979 but never advanced beyond Triple-A ball. Growing up in the Chicago suburb of Mundelein, Borucki was a fan of the Chicago White Sox .

Borucki married his wife on October 5, 2020. The couple has an elf sphynx cat named Dobby, who is featured on one of Borucki's practice gloves.
