= Mundelein High School =

Public school in Illinois, United States

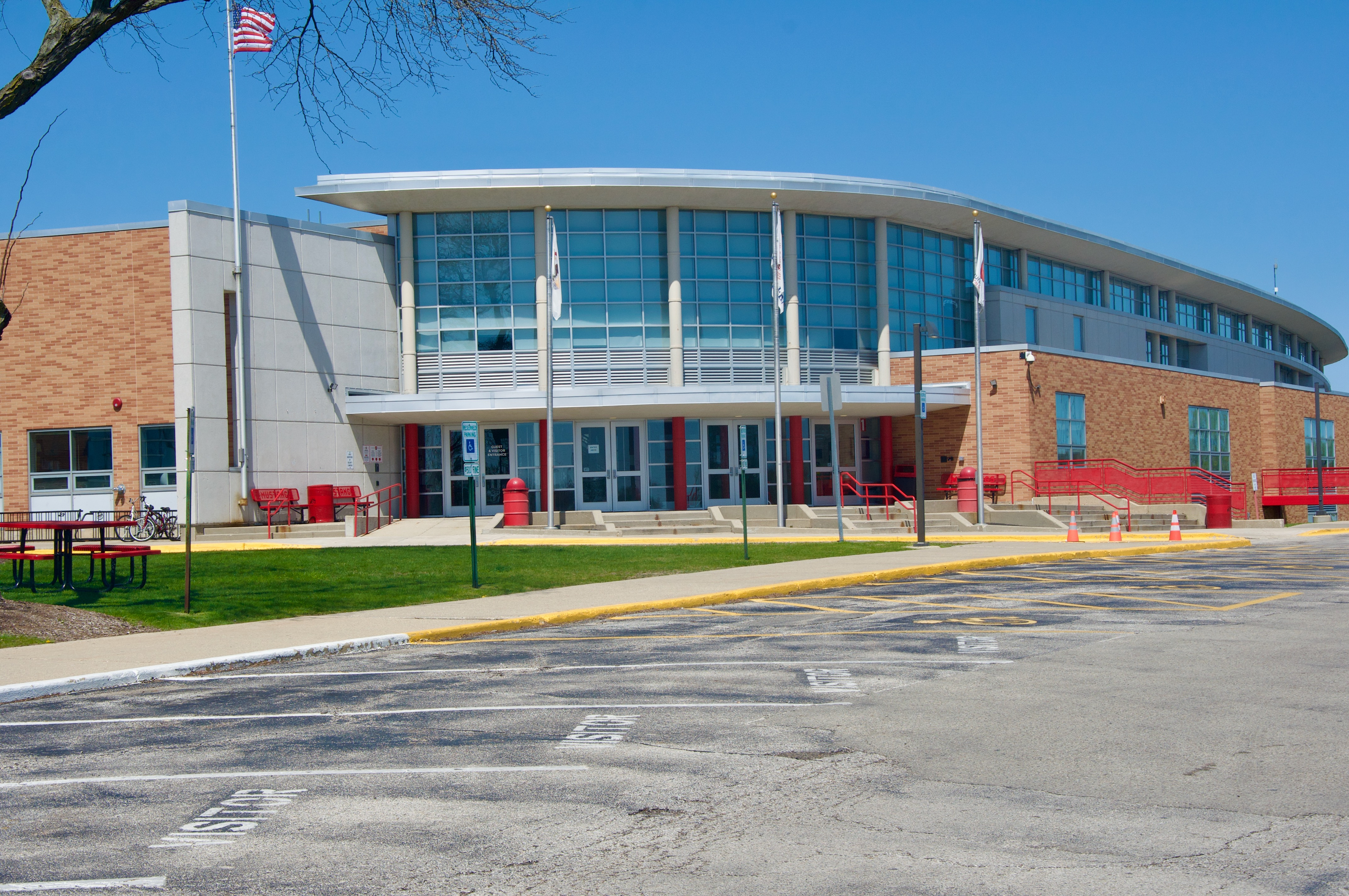

Location
- 1350 W. Hawley Street; Mundelein, Illinois 60060; United States; 42.27112°N 88.02235°W

Information
- Type: Public high school
- Motto: The Door to Every Student's Future
- Established: 1961
- School district: Mundelein Consolidated High School District 120
- Principal: Alexandria Rios Taylor
- Teaching staff: 139.60 (on an FTE basis)
- Grades: 9–12
- Enrollment: 2,261 (2023-2024)
- Student to teacher ratio: 16.20
- Colors: Scarlet; Gray
- Athletics conference: North Suburban Conference
- Mascot: Maverick The Mustang
- Newspaper: The Mustang
- Yearbook: Obelisk
- Website: d120.org

Mundelein High School (MHS) is a public four-year high school located in Mundelein, Illinois, a northern suburb of Chicago, Illinois, in the United States. The school serves the Village of Mundelein and parts of surrounding villages, include Vernon Hills, Grayslake, Hawthorn Woods, Round Lake, Wauconda and Libertyville. Its feeder schools include Carl Sandburg Middle School, Fremont Middle School, West Oak Middle School portions of Hawthorn Middle School North and Hawthorn Middle School South.

== History ==
The school was contracted in 1960 and commenced classes in 1961. The school was expanded in 1973, 1977, 1987 (including a new pool), 1997, and 2016 (including a new STEM wing). A 2023 referendum for a renovation of the school failed to pass that would have costed over $225 million, $175 million of which would have been funded by a raise in property taxes. A 2024 referendum to improve the MHS facilities passed. Key elements of these improvements will be updating aging infrastructure, solving overcrowding issues, making health, safety, and security improvements, upgrading instructional spaces, and enhancing career & technical education areas. The total cost of the project is estimated at $199.5 million.

== Academics ==
At one time, the school was home to an "Aviation Technology" class from 1980 until the early 2000s in which students constructed an airplane from a kit for private sponsors. The class prepared future aviation technicians. It was one of the few aviation technology programs in a high school. It was removed from the curriculum due to lack of sponsors and a lack of accredited teachers, as the school required teachers to not only hold an Illinois teaching certificate but also either a pilot's license or an airframe-and-powerplant mechanic certificate from the FAA.

During the 1992-93 school year, Mundelein High School was awarded the Blue Ribbon School Award of Excellence by the United States Department of Education.

== Athletics ==
The Mundelein Mustangs compete in the North Suburban Conference. The boys' gymnastics team won state championships in 1989, 1990, 1993, 1998, 1999, and 2000.

According to the Chicago Tribune, the school has "one of Lake County’s most successful high school baseball programs", being the runner-up in the 2016 and 2022 for the IHSA Class 4A baseball tournament. The program had to postpone several games in 2023 due to allegations of hazing and violations from several students of the school's athletic code of conduct.

== Demographics ==
According to the 2023–2024 Mundelein High School fact sheet, 47.6% of students for that year were Hispanic, 39.4% were White, 6.0% were Two or More races, 4.8% were Asian, and 2.1% were Black.

== Performing arts ==
MHS fields two competitive show choirs: the varsity/open division "Sound" and the JV/prep division “Reverb”. The program formerly hosted an annual competition.

Mundelein also has a competitive dance team, which hosts an annual invitational.

Mundelein has a band program. In 2020 and 2021, the Jazz Ensemble performed at the Midwest International Band and Orchestra Clinic. Its Jazz Ensemble also won first at the Purdue Jazz Festivals in 2019, 2020, and 2022.

== Notable alumni ==
- Ryan Borucki, professional Major League Baseball player for the Toronto Blue Jays, Seattle Mariners and Pittsburgh Pirates
- Sean McNanie, professional football player for the Buffalo Bills, Phoenix Cardinals, and Indianapolis Colts
- Ben Brust, college basketball player for the Wisconsin Badgers, Final Four participant, and Wisconsin media personality
