= Mundelein, Illinois =

- Village
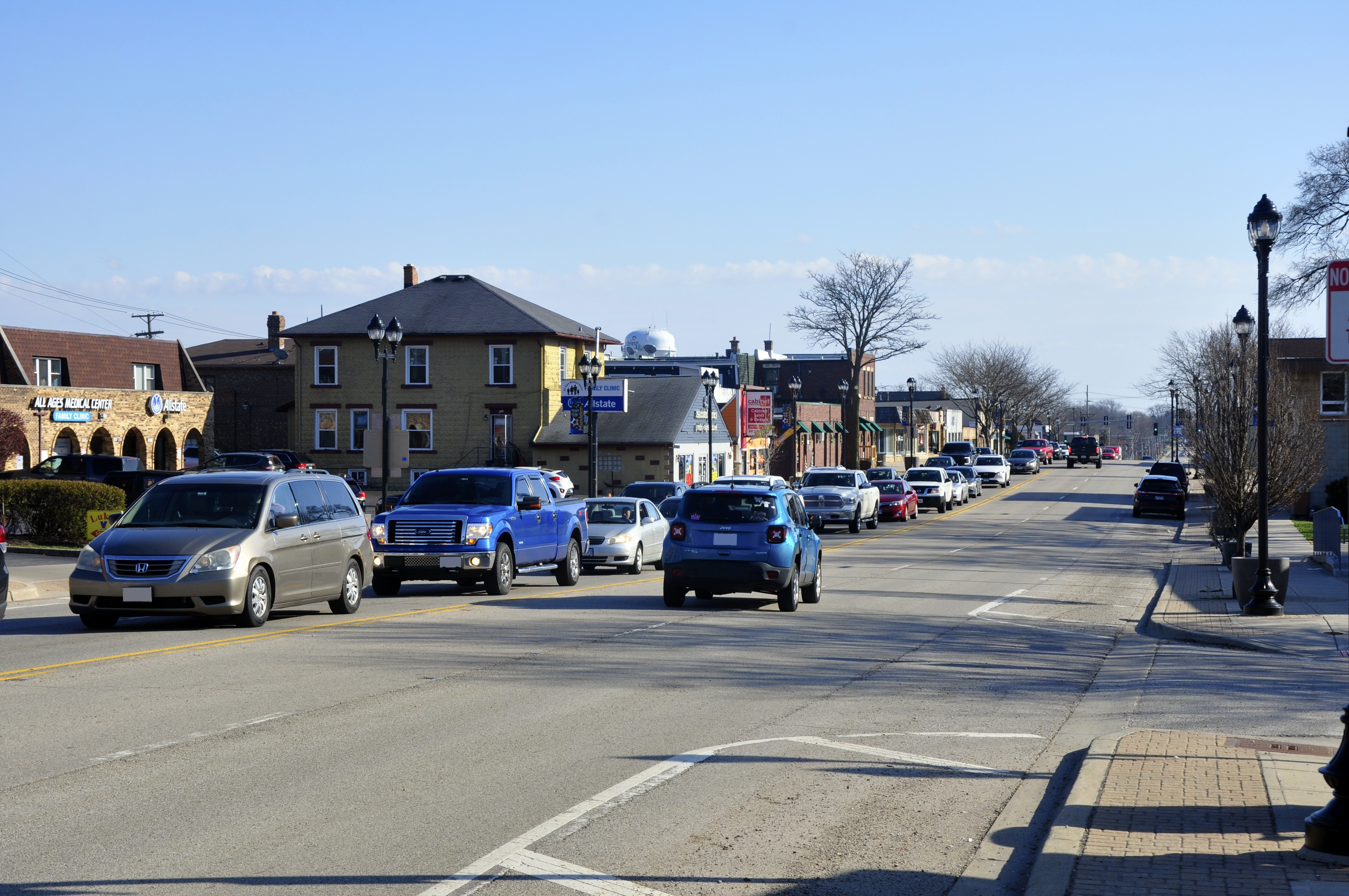
- Downtown Mundelein in March 2024

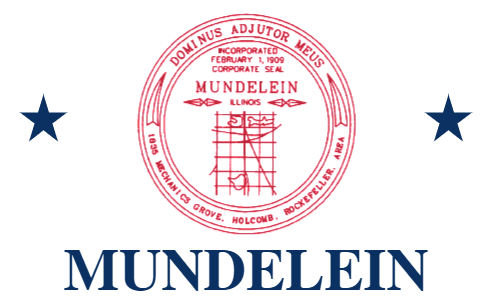
- Flag Logo
- Motto: "Start here. Star here"
- Location within Illinois
- Coordinates: 42°15′28″N 88°00′12″W
- Country: United States
- State: Illinois
- County: Lake
- Township: Fremont, Libertyville
- Incorporated: February 1, 1909; 117 years ago

Government
  - Type: Village

Area
  - Total: 9.99 sq mi (25.88 km^{2})
  - Land: 9.59 sq mi (24.83 km^{2})
  - Water: 0.41 sq mi (1.05 km^{2})
- Elevation: 742 ft (226 m)

Population (2020)
  - Total: 31,560
  - Density: 3,292.1/sq mi (1,271.09/km^{2})
- Time zone: UTC-6 (CST)
  - Summer (DST): UTC-5 (CDT)
- ZIP code: 60060
- Area code(s): 847 and 224
- FIPS code: 17-51349
- GNIS feature ID: 2399428
- Website: www.mundelein.org

Mundelein is a village in Lake County, Illinois, United States and a northern suburb of Chicago. Per the 2020 census, the population was 31,560, making this the fourth largest town in Lake County. The village straddles Libertyville Township and Fremont Township, and borders Grayslake, Ivanhoe, Diamond Lake, and Libertyville. The village lies 33 miles northwest of the Chicago Loop.

Mundelein was first settled by European settlers in 1835, and was incorporated in 1909 after a spur line connected the village to the Chicago North Shore and Milwaukee Railroad. The University of Saint Mary of the Lake opened in 1921, and in June 1926 the village hosted the closing events of the 28th International Eucharistic Congress, bringing hundreds of thousands of people to the village. Its name was changed four times over its history, including two after incorporation.

== History ==
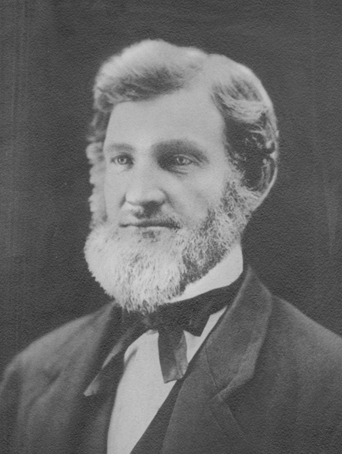
Photograph of John Holcomb, the former namesake of Mundelein

=== Pre-incorporation ===
Native Americans of the area, such as the Potawatomi people, were trading with French trappers as early as 1650. The Potwatomi had settled on a camp on the south end of Diamond Lake. Natives lost possession of land in the area in 1836 and were forced west of the Mississippi River. Peter Shaddle was the first European settler in 1835, and built a log cabin, finally acquired by University of Saint Mary of the Lake. Shaddle sold his claim to settlers from New York.

Later settlers from England named the town "Mechanics Grove", due to the settler's occupations of millwrights, wheelwrights and carpenters. The town's first school opened in 1837 and a church the following year.

The town name changed to "Holcomb" in the early 1850s, for a settler named John Holcomb. He migrated from New York in 1847 and was a civic and spiritual leader in the community through his participation in the Methodist Episcopal Church and for his service in township offices. In 1885, he donated 20 acres of land to the Wisconsin Central Railroad. The same year, the town was renamed after American businessman William Rockefeller Jr., who was a major stockholder in the Wisconsin Central Railroad. Rockefeller was incorporated on February 1, 1909, in a referendum in anticipation of an economic boom after the Chicago North Shore and Milwaukee Railroad built a spur line terminating at Rockefeller in 1904. Residents from nearby Diamond Lake, Illinois were included in the vote in order to meet the minimum resident requirements, although they later withdrew from the village.

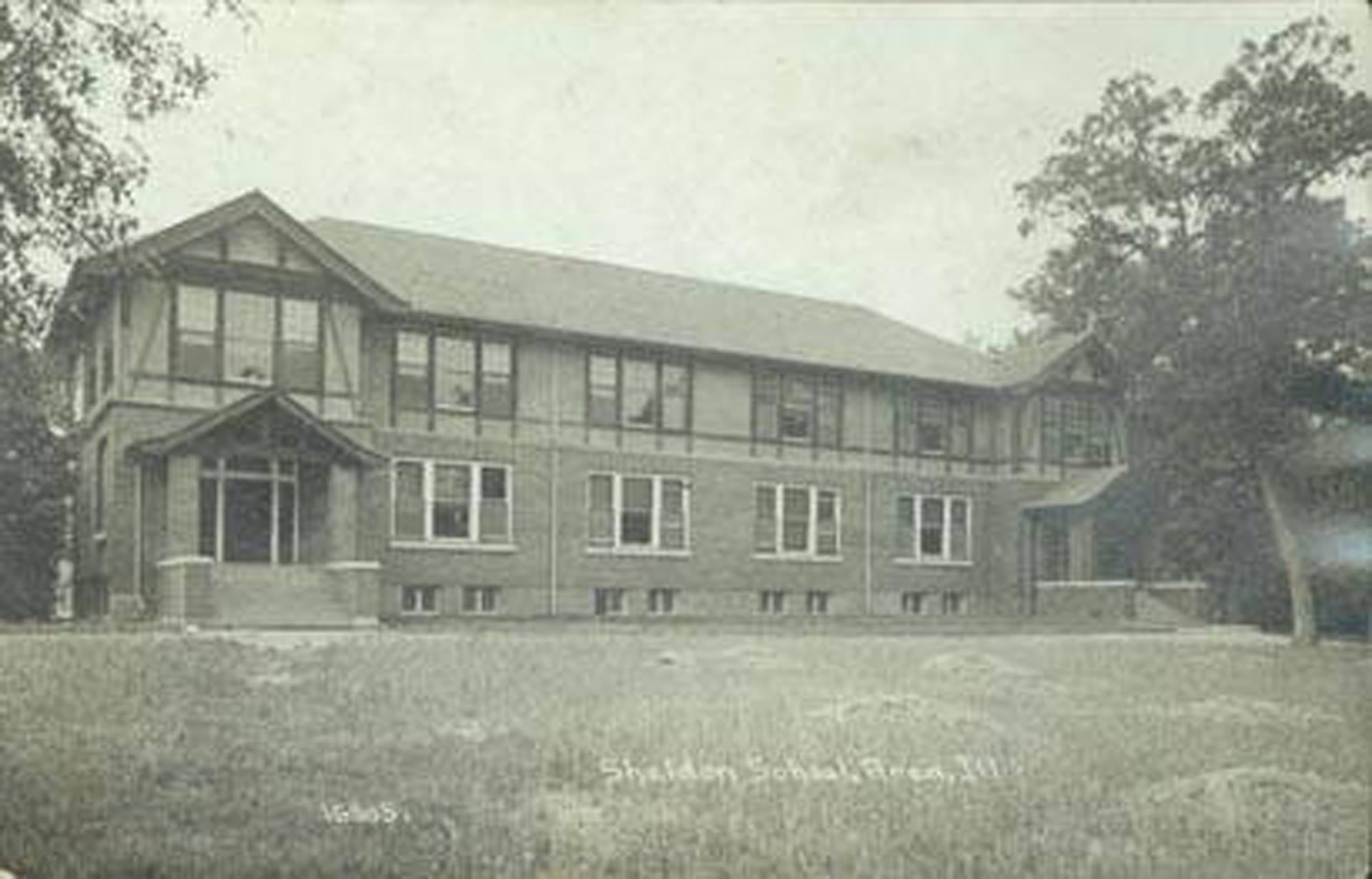
Photograph of Sheldon School

=== Post-incorporation ===
==== 1909 to 1925 ====
The village was renamed from Rockefeller to "Area" in July 1909. The name was from a sales school in the village called Sheldon School, which had the motto of "Ability, Reliability, Endurance, and Action". In 1909, Sheldon had purchased 600 acres (2.4 km^{2}) of land for the construction of the school. His property contained a lake named Mud Lake, which was dammed and renamed Lake Eara. Sheldon had opened another business school in Chicago in 1902. Classes first began at the school in 1910, with students from Nicaragua, Australia, Mexico, and Germany. At its peak, the school had over 10,000 students. Sheldon's business failed, with the Electronic Encyclopedia of Chicago suggesting that the failure was a result of World War I. Sheldon sold his estate to the Archbishop of Chicago George Mundelein to open University of Saint Mary of the Lake in 1921.

On December 10, 1924, the Village Board held a special meeting with representatives from the Soo Line Railroad, who requested that the board change the village's name to Mundelein for the cardinal. The Illinois Secretary of State approved in April 1925, and the board passed an ordinance changing the village name to Mundelein.

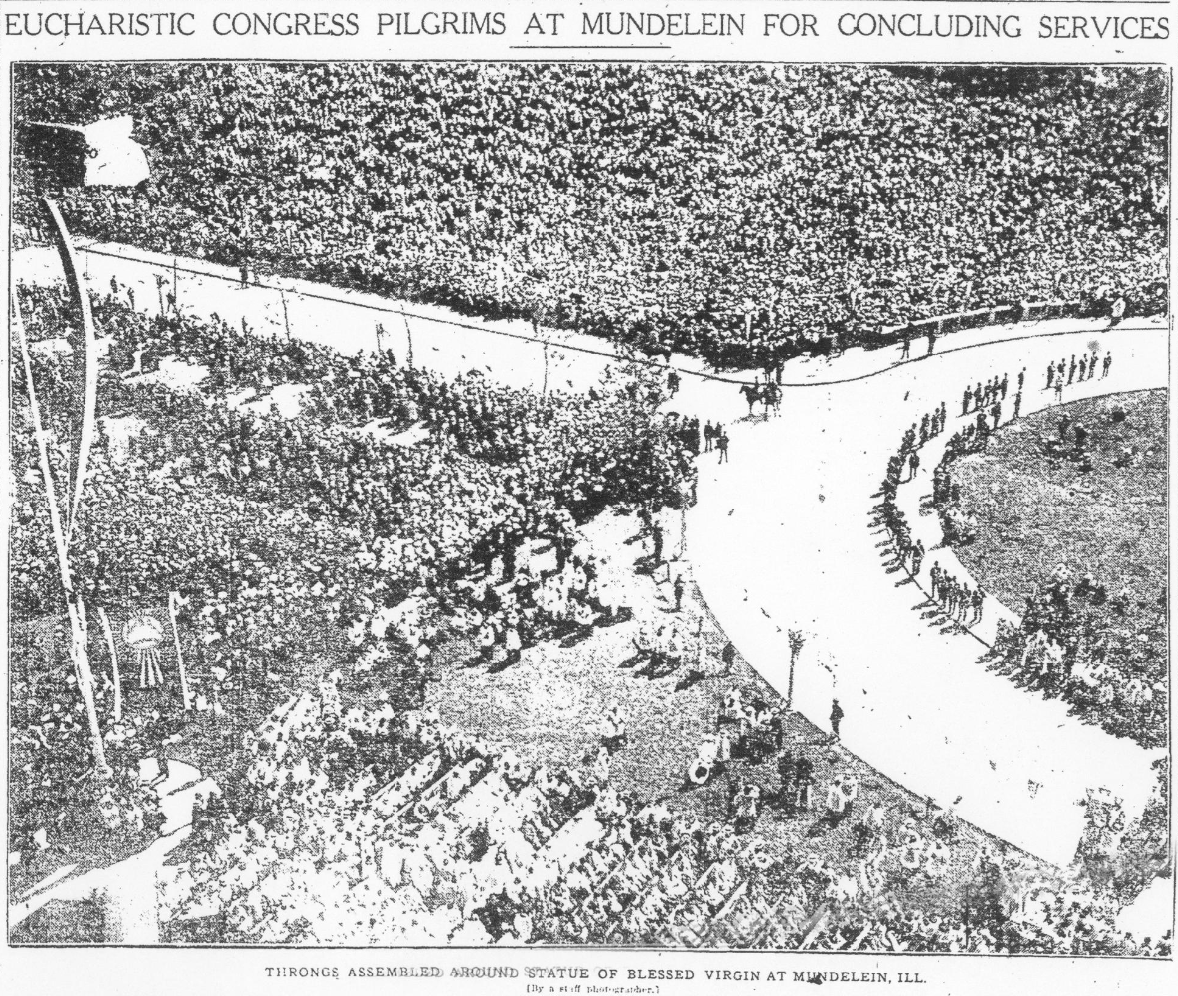
28th International Eucharistic Congress on June 24, 1926

==== 28th International Eucharistic Congress ====
The closing events for the 28th International Eucharistic Congress were held at the University of Saint Mary of the Lake on June 24, 1926. Approximately half a million people appeared, including 10,000 nuns, 8,000 priests, 390 bishops, 64 archbishops, and 12 cardinals. Trains brought people to the village every 30 minutes before mass. A temporary terminal was built at the future site of Carmel High School to accommodate the events. It existed until the Great Depression. 18,000 cars went through Mundelein on that day, and thousands of National Guard troops were sent to control traffic for the event. In total, 820 trains went through the Mundelein station from dawn to midnight on that day.

Two events were scheduled for the Seminary, a Solemn Pontifical Mass at 10:00 am, and a Procession at 2:00 pm. During the procession, a violent thunderstorm passed the seminary, leaving people at the procession "tired and soaked to the skin". The seminary was left with litter and damaged lawns after the event.

==== Since 1930 ====
Floods in 1936 and 1937 severely damaged the village. The first flood occurred on September 27, 1936, after 1.33 inches of rain fell onto the village, damaging businesses. The second occurred in June 1937, flooding the village's main road and causing further damage to adjacent neighborhoods and businesses.

By the 1970s, the community was largely residential with a little light industrial development. Ranches and tri-level houses were built in the 1950s and 1960s in the center of town, with larger, two-story houses in the village's periphery built from the 1970s.

A major employer of the village, Ball Glass, closed in the early 1980s. The village saw economic and industrial growth during the 1990s, gaining over 10,000 residents between the 1980 and 1990 United States census.

Mundelein greatly expanded in size in 2022 with the annexation of over 700 acres of land owned by the Wirtz family; the owners of the Chicago Blackhawks. The plan was to develop 1,200 houses and 600 townhomes there.

In January 2026, the Audubon Council of Illinois designated it an Illinois Bird City.

== Geography ==
Mundelein is located 33 miles (53 km) northwest of the Chicago Loop. According to the 2021 census gazetteer files, Mundelein has a total area of 9.99 square miles (25.87 km^{2}), of which 9.59 square miles (24.84 km^{2}) (or 95.95%) is land and 0.41 square miles (1.06 km^{2}) (or 4.05%) is water. Mundelein borders Hawthorn Woods and Vernon Hills to the south and east, and is primarily located within the Indian Creek watershed in Lake County.

=== Climate ===
Under the Köppen climate classification, Mundelein is a Humid continental climate zone (Dfa) under the hot summer subtype with cold winters and warm to hot summers. Since 1999, the record high was 103 °F in July 2012 during the 2012 North American heat wave, while the record low was -26 °F in January 2019 during the January–February 2019 North American cold wave.

Climate data for MUNDELEIN 4WSW, IL (1999–2024)
| Month | Jan | Feb | Mar | Apr | May | Jun | Jul | Aug | Sep | Oct | Nov | Dec | Year |
|---|---|---|---|---|---|---|---|---|---|---|---|---|---|
| Record high °F (°C) | 63 (17) | 75 (24) | 84 (29) | 89 (32) | 94 (34) | 98 (37) | 103 (39) | 97 (36) | 94 (34) | 87 (31) | 75 (24) | 68 (20) | 103 (39) |
| Mean maximum °F (°C) | 51 (11) | 55 (13) | 68 (20) | 80 (27) | 87 (31) | 91 (33) | 92 (33) | 92 (33) | 89 (32) | 81 (27) | 67 (19) | 55 (13) | 92 (33) |
| Mean daily maximum °F (°C) | 29.8 (−1.2) | 33.1 (0.6) | 45.2 (7.3) | 57.4 (14.1) | 68.3 (20.2) | 78.1 (25.6) | 82.4 (28.0) | 81.1 (27.3) | 74.7 (23.7) | 61.3 (16.3) | 47.6 (8.7) | 35.0 (1.7) | 56.7 (13.7) |
| Daily mean °F (°C) | 21.2 (−6.0) | 24.6 (−4.1) | 35.0 (1.7) | 46.3 (7.9) | 57.7 (14.3) | 67.8 (19.9) | 72.2 (22.3) | 70.8 (21.6) | 63.3 (17.4) | 51.1 (10.6) | 38.3 (3.5) | 26.9 (−2.8) | 47.9 (8.9) |
| Mean daily minimum °F (°C) | 14.3 (−9.8) | 15.3 (−9.3) | 26.3 (−3.2) | 36.2 (2.3) | 47.5 (8.6) | 57.8 (14.3) | 62.5 (16.9) | 61.0 (16.1) | 53.5 (11.9) | 41.8 (5.4) | 30.4 (−0.9) | 19.8 (−6.8) | 37.8 (3.2) |
| Mean minimum °F (°C) | −7 (−22) | −5 (−21) | 7 (−14) | 23 (−5) | 34 (1) | 44 (7) | 51 (11) | 50 (10) | 40 (4) | 28 (−2) | 15 (−9) | 0 (−18) | −11 (−24) |
| Record low °F (°C) | −26 (−32) | −26 (−32) | −11 (−24) | 15 (−9) | 25 (−4) | 35 (2) | 44 (7) | 45 (7) | 34 (1) | 22 (−6) | 4 (−16) | −12 (−24) | −26 (−32) |
| Average precipitation inches (mm) | 1.75 (44) | 2.04 (52) | 2.59 (66) | 3.72 (94) | 4.46 (113) | 4.46 (113) | 4.21 (107) | 3.69 (94) | 3.72 (94) | 3.27 (83) | 2.09 (53) | 2.30 (58) | 37.01 (940) |
| Average snowfall inches (cm) | 11.4 (29) | 11.6 (29) | 5.1 (13) | 1.7 (4.3) | 0 (0) | 0 (0) | 0 (0) | 0 (0) | 0 (0) | 0 (0) | 2.5 (6.4) | 8.9 (23) | 41.2 (104.7) |
| Average extreme snow depth inches (cm) | 7 (18) | 8 (20) | 4 (10) | 1 (2.5) | 0 (0) | 0 (0) | 0 (0) | 0 (0) | 0 (0) | 0 (0) | 2 (5.1) | 4 (10) | 10 (25) |
Source: xmACIS2

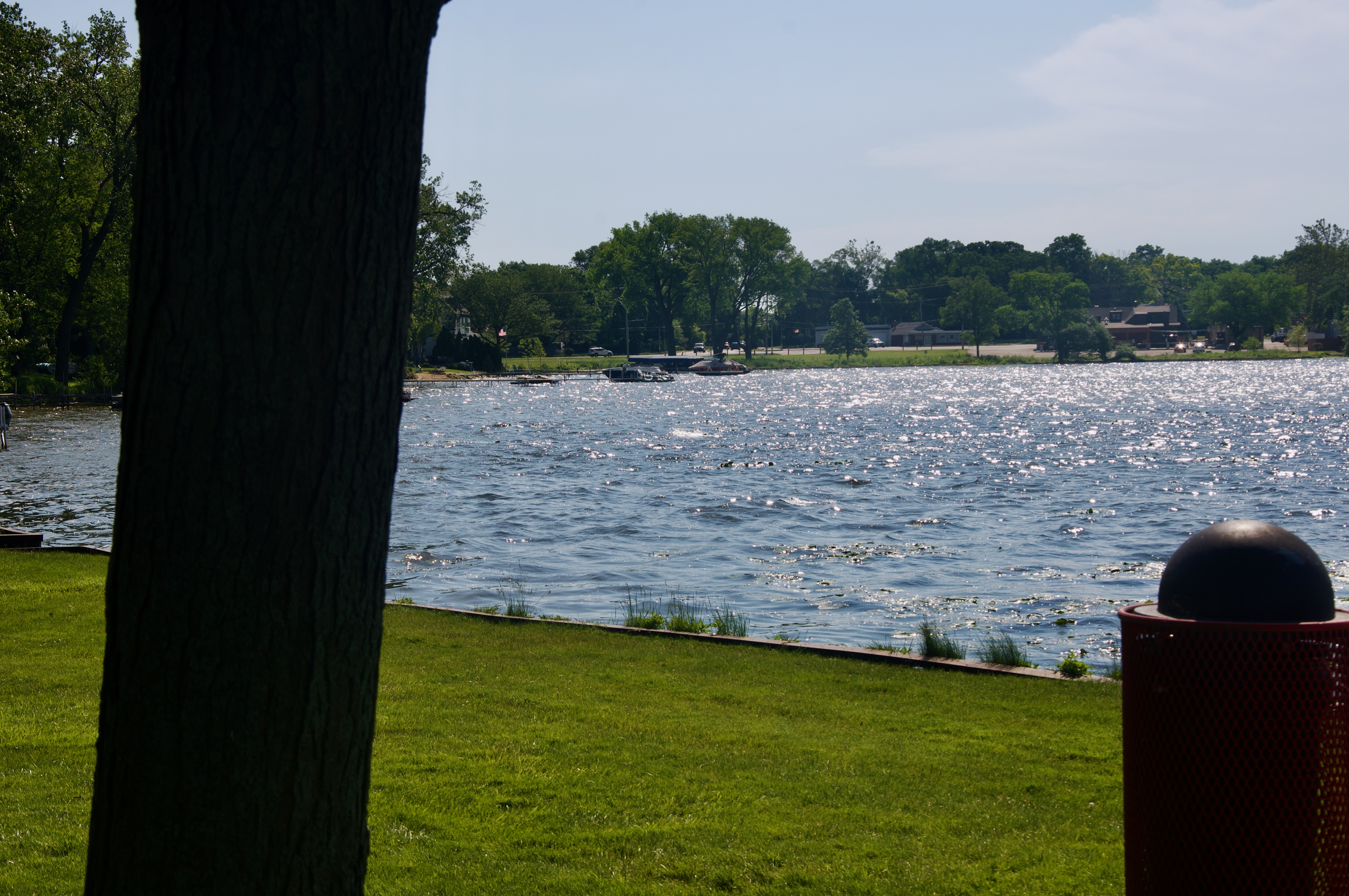
Diamond Lake in 2024

=== Diamond Lake ===
Diamond Lake is a 153-acre glacial lake in south Mundelein. It is primarily used for fishing and swimming and has been settled by Europeans since the 19th-century. The maximum depth of the lake is 23.56 feet, with an average depth of 7.65 feet. The lake is primarily used for swimming, fishing, and boating, and drains into the Des Plaines River.

== Demographics ==
Historical population
| Census | Pop. | Note | %± |
|---|---|---|---|
| 1910 | 358 | | — |
| 1920 | 420 | | 17.3% |
| 1930 | 1,011 | | 140.7% |
| 1940 | 1,328 | | 31.4% |
| 1950 | 3,189 | | 140.1% |
| 1960 | 10,526 | | 230.1% |
| 1970 | 16,128 | | 53.2% |
| 1980 | 17,053 | | 5.7% |
| 1990 | 21,215 | | 24.4% |
| 2000 | 30,935 | | 45.8% |
| 2010 | 31,064 | | 0.4% |
| 2020 | 31,560 | | 1.6% |
U.S. Decennial Census; 2010 2020

=== Racial and ethnic composition ===
Mundelein village, Illinois – racial and ethnic composition Note: the US Census treats Hispanic/Latino as an ethnic category. This table excludes Latinos from the racial categories and assigns them to a separate category. Hispanics/Latinos may be of any race.
| Race / Ethnicity (NH = Non-Hispanic) | Pop 2000 | Pop 2010 | Pop 2020 | % 2000 | % 2010 | % 2020 |
|---|---|---|---|---|---|---|
| White alone (NH) | 20,566 | 18,123 | 16,431 | 66.48% | 58.34% | 52.06% |
| Black or African American alone (NH) | 464 | 416 | 601 | 1.50% | 1.34% | 1.90% |
| Native American or Alaska Native alone (NH) | 20 | 28 | 21 | 0.06% | 0.09% | 0.07% |
| Asian alone (NH) | 2,025 | 2,719 | 3,492 | 6.55% | 8.75% | 11.06% |
| Native Hawaiian or Pacific Islander alone (NH) | 10 | 6 | 7 | 0.03% | 0.02% | 0.02% |
| Other race alone (NH) | 25 | 38 | 80 | 0.08% | 0.12% | 0.25% |
| Mixed race or Multiracial (NH) | 338 | 390 | 836 | 1.09% | 1.26% | 2.65% |
| Hispanic or Latino (any race) | 7,487 | 9,344 | 10,092 | 24.20% | 30.08% | 31.98% |
| Total | 30,935 | 31,064 | 31,560 | 100.00% | 100.00% | 100.00% |

=== 2020 census ===
As of the 2020 census, Mundelein had a population of 31,560. The population density was 3,158.53 inhabitants per square mile (1,219.52/km^{2}). There were 11,967 housing units at an average density of 1,197.66 per square mile (462.42/km^{2}).

The median age was 38.8 years. 22.9% of residents were under the age of 18 and 14.8% of residents were 65 years of age or older. For every 100 females there were 100.9 males, and for every 100 females age 18 and over there were 99.1 males age 18 and over.

100.0% of residents lived in urban areas, while 0.0% lived in rural areas.

There were 11,417 households and 8,209 families in Mundelein, of which 33.9% had children under the age of 18 living in them. Of all households, 57.9% were married-couple households, 15.3% were households with a male householder and no spouse or partner present, and 21.6% were households with a female householder and no spouse or partner present. About 21.5% of all households were made up of individuals and 8.8% had someone living alone who was 65 years of age or older.

Of the housing units, 4.6% were vacant. The homeowner vacancy rate was 1.2% and the rental vacancy rate was 7.7%.

=== Income and poverty ===
The median income for a household in the village was $91,535, and the median income for a family was $102,531. Males had a median income of $50,025 versus $36,522 for females. The per capita income for the village was $39,003. About 4.9% of families and 6.9% of the population were below the poverty line, including 14.3% of those under age 18 and 4.0% of those age 65 or over.

== Government ==
Mundelein's government consists of a board of trustees of made up of six members and a mayor. The current mayor of Mundelein is Robin Meier, who was elected in early 2025.

=== Fire department ===
The fire department of Mundelein is called the Mundelein Fire Department, and before 1956, the Mundelein-Countryside fire Department Corporation. The first fire station in Mundelein was opened in 1947 south of the downtown area, being initially built with four bays, but later expanded to six bays. The department had no full-time employees until 1960. Five additions were added to the station between 1952 and 1961, including a second story to the building. The department moved into its current building on Midlothian Road in 2000.

Cardinal Mundelein donated the village its first new fire truck, a 1925 Stoughton. The fire truck was officially turned over to the village at a ceremony held at the St. Mary of the Lake Seminary on July 17, 1925. The fire truck, nicknamed "Old No. 1", was restored in 2008.

=== Law enforcement ===
Mundelein Police Department is the law enforcement agency of Mundelein. Initially stationed in the now-demolished village hall with a one-man police force, the department got its own police station in 1964 on Seymour Avenue and Division Street, before moving into its current building in 2002. The site of the original station is now a water retention area.

=== Parks ===
The park district of Mundelein is the Mundelein Parks and Recreation District. The organization won three awards in October 2021 from the Illinois Association of Park Districts, two of which were from business partnerships. The district runs an outdoor pool named Barefoot Bay. The park district opened in 1954 and manages over 700 acres and over 30 parks.

=== Post Office ===
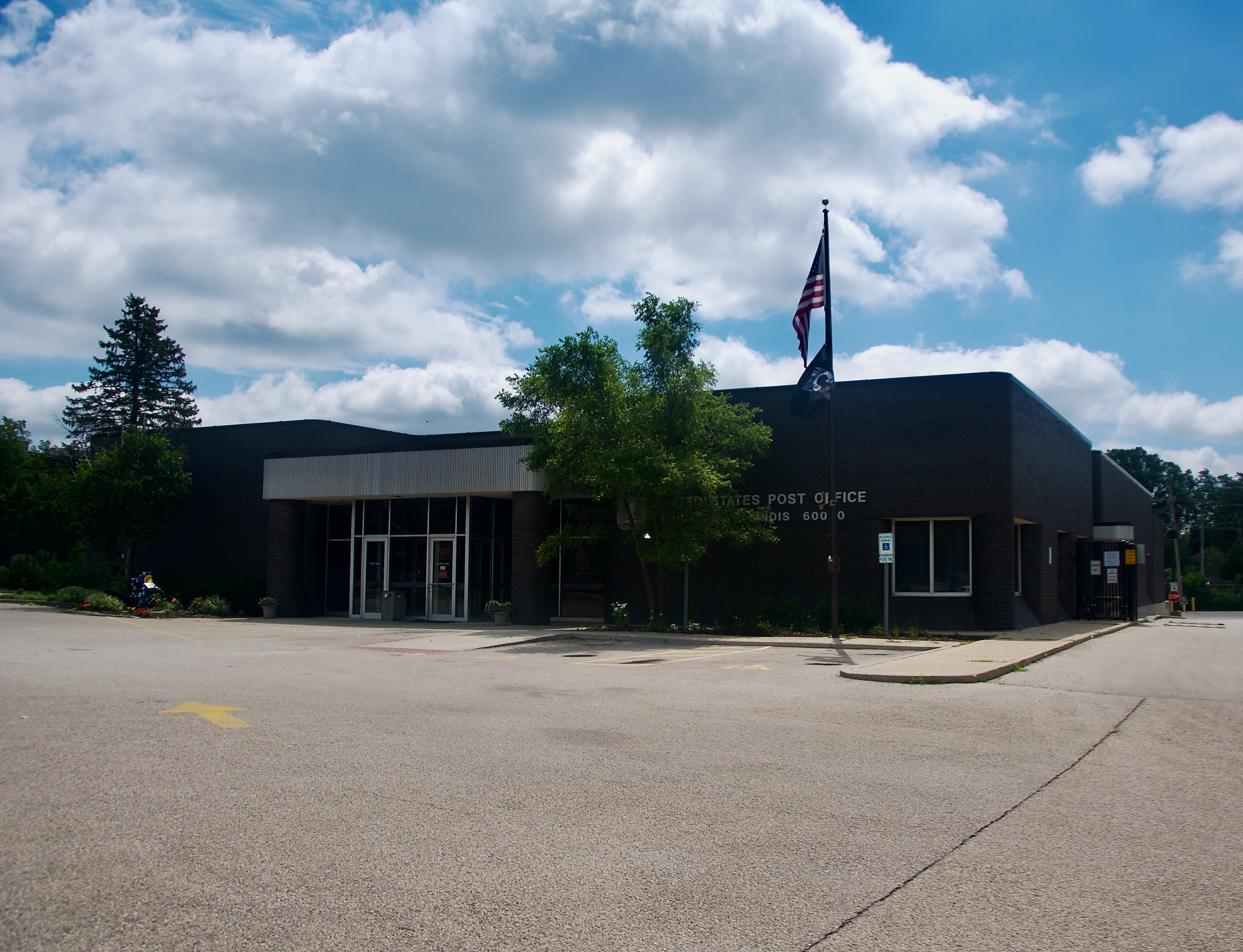
Post Office of Mundelein

The first post office of Mundelein was established in 1887, in a building which is now used a store. The current facility was opened in 1976 across from the location of the former village hall.

=== Mayors ===
Mayors of Mundelein, Illinois

| Image | Mayor | Years | Notes |
|---|---|---|---|
| | Sylvester L. Tripp | 1909–1911 | |
| | Richard A. Smith | 1911–1913 | |
| | Harvey A. Watson | 1913–1917 | |
| | Robert F. Rouse | 1917–1919 | |
| | Thomas Russell | 1919–1921 | |
| | Robert F. Rouse | 1921–1945 | |
| | Eldon H. Gleason | 1945–1953 | |
| | John Noel | 1953–1965 | |
| | Richard M. Foss | 1965–1973 | |
| | Maurice Noll | 1973–1977 | |
| | Colin McRae | 1977–1989 | |
| | Marilyn Sindles | 1989–2005 | |
| | Kenneth Kessler | 2005–2013 | |
| | Steve Lentz | 2013–2025 | |
| | Robin D Meier | May 12, 2025 – Present | |

== Places ==
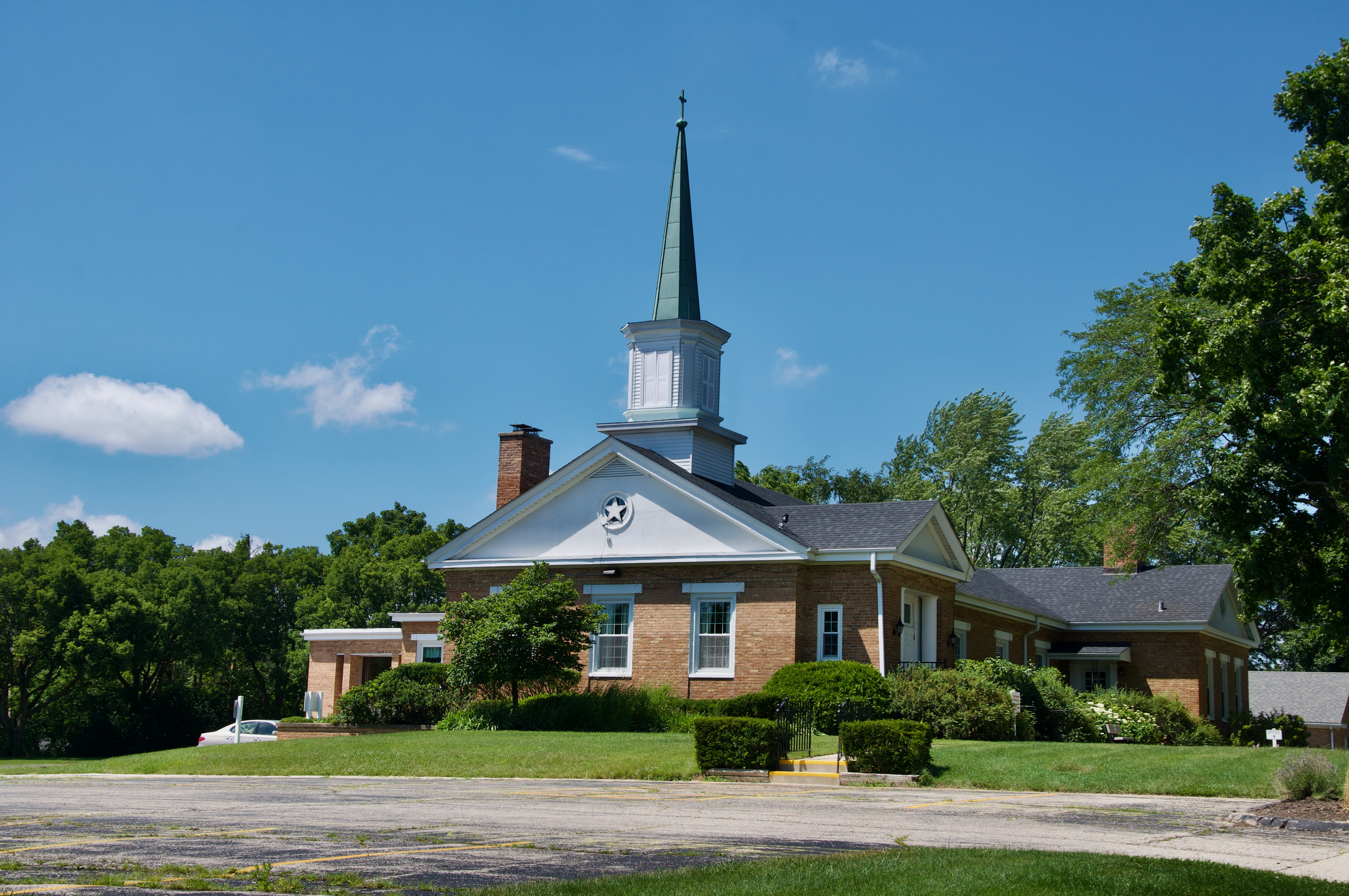
Community Protestant Church

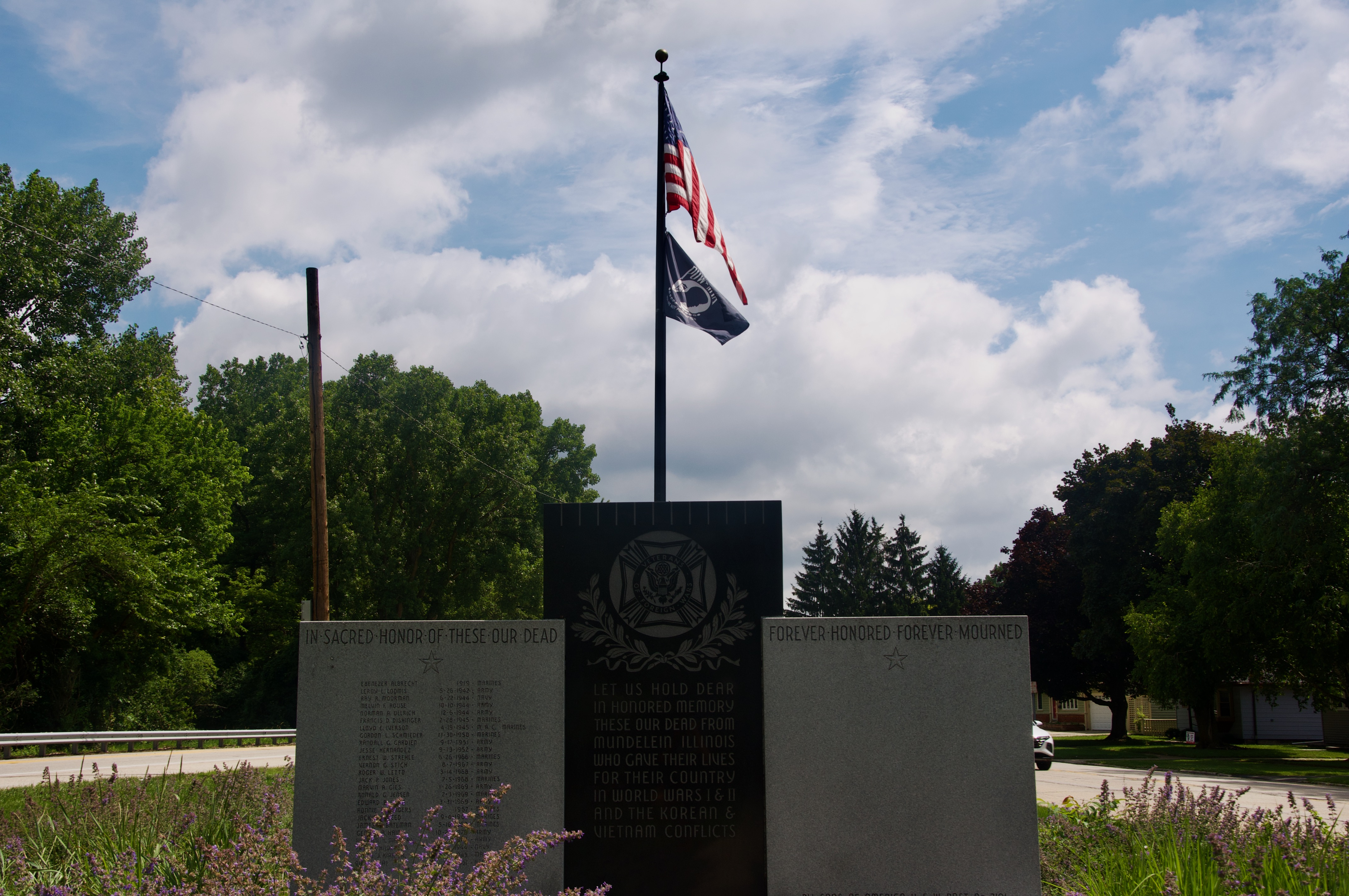
Memorial Point

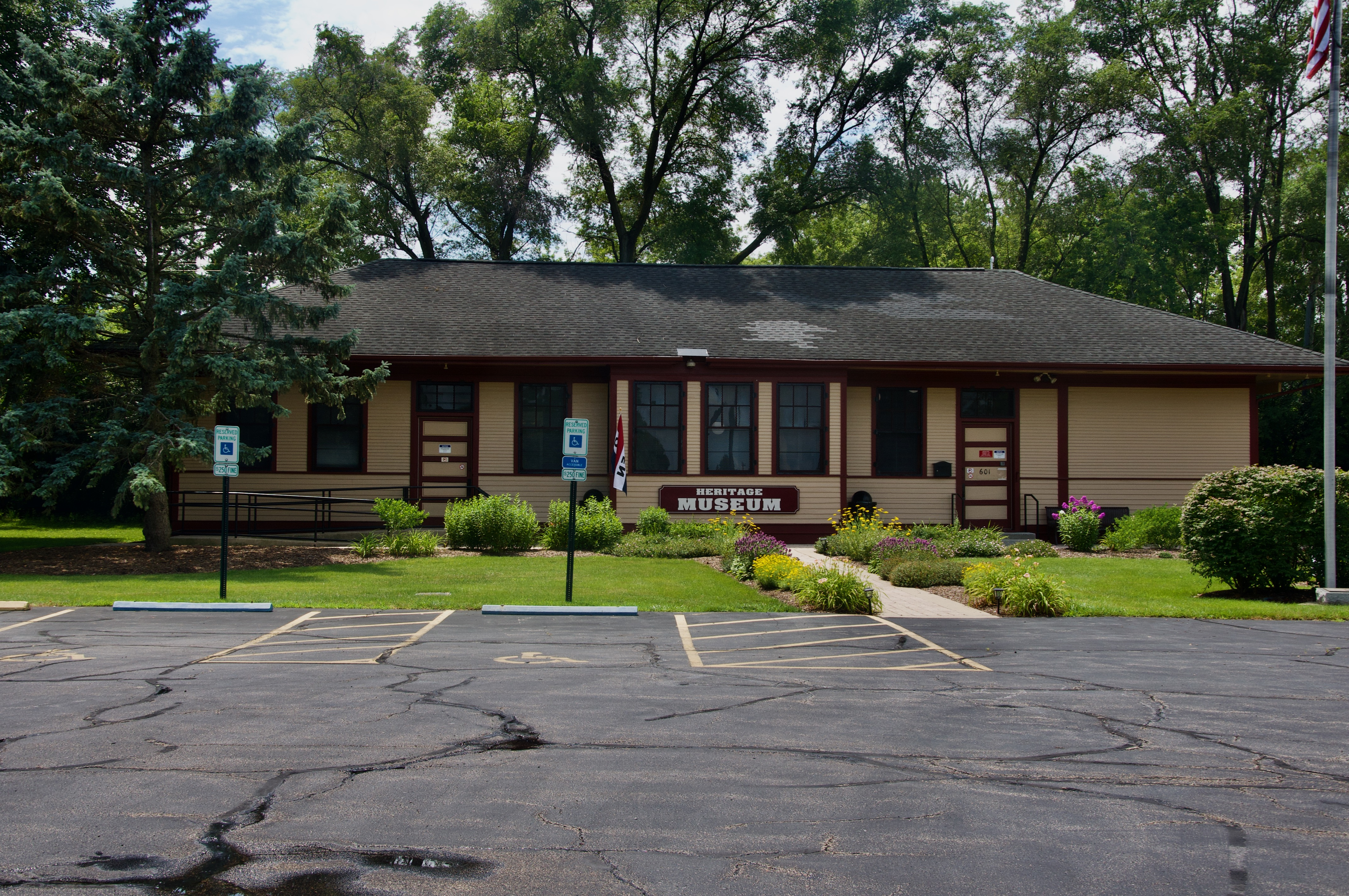
Mundelein Heritage Museum

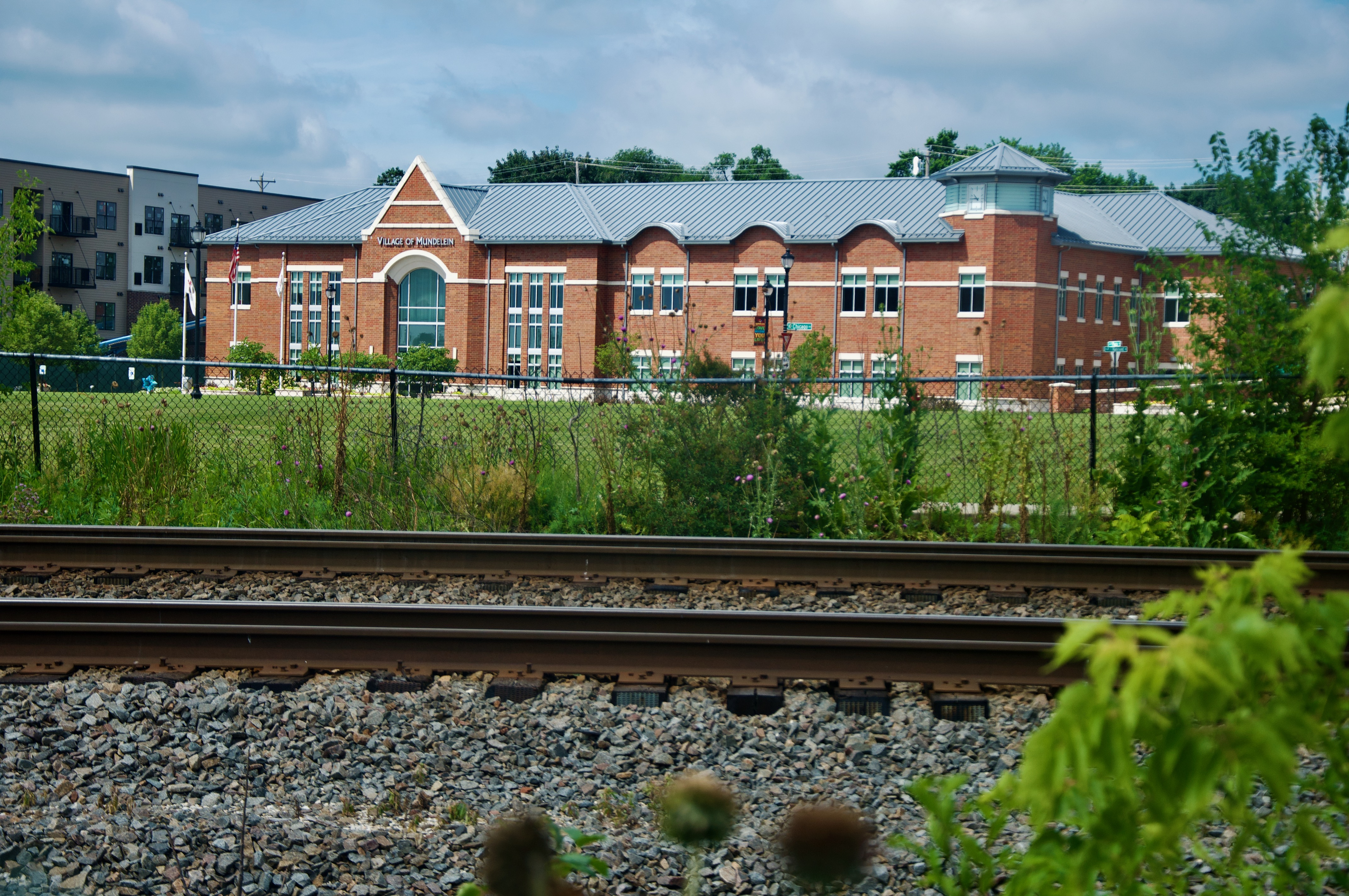
Mundelein Village Hall from a nearby parking lot

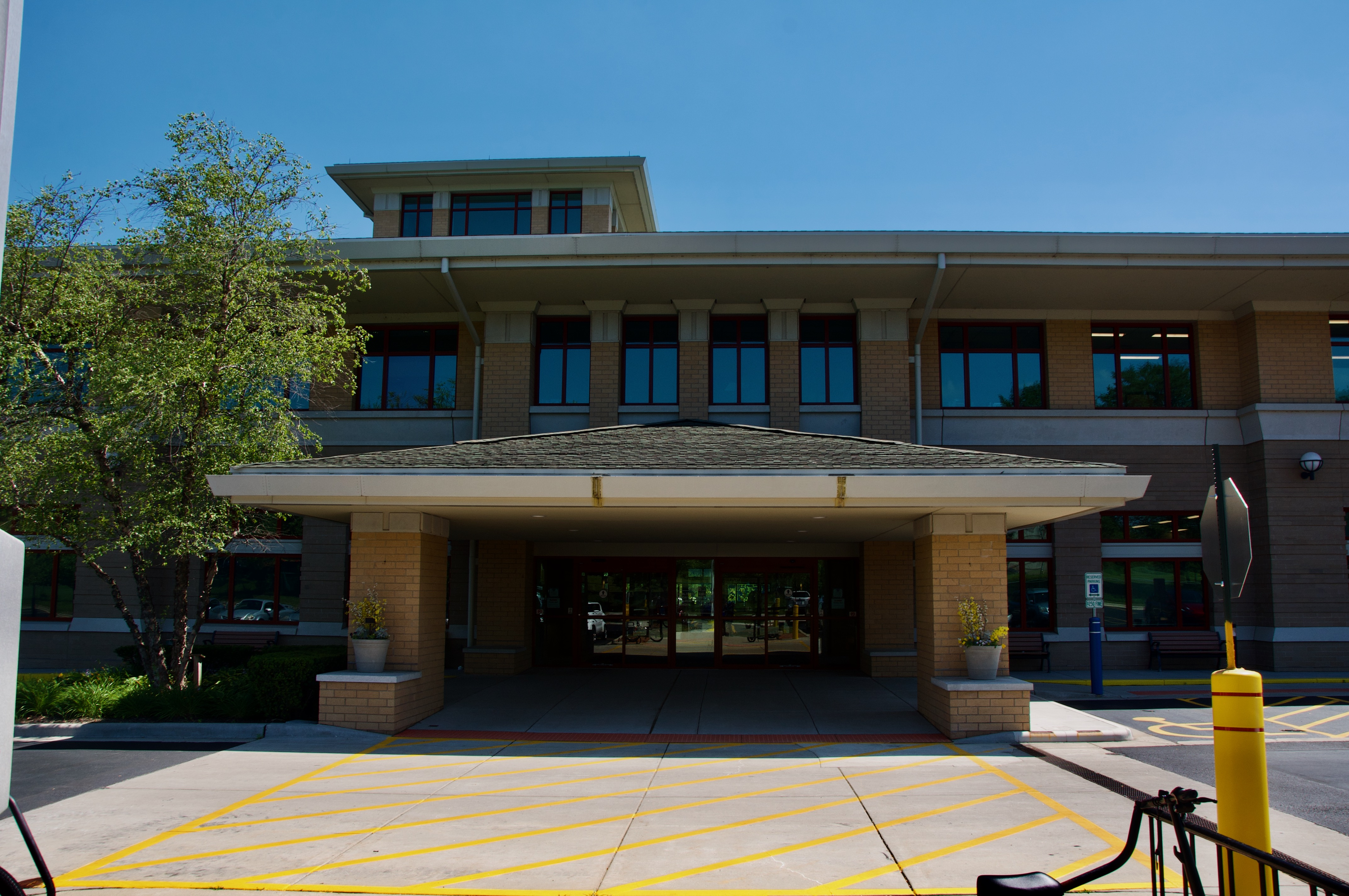
Fremont Public Library

=== Mundelein Heritage Museum ===
Mundelein Heritage Museum is a museum owned by the Mundelein Historical Commission. The museum opened in 1983 in a train facility, which been intended for the Soo Line Railroad in the 1920s. The Historical Society of Fort Hill Country, founded in 1983, previously ran the museum as the Fort Hill Museum, until the society disbanded in 2018 due to low membership. The museum was closed from 2018 to 2020, as operations of the museum were transferred to the Mundelein Historical Commission.

=== Memorial Point ===
Memorial Point is a triangle-shaped war memorial located at the intersection of Hawley Street and Illinois Route 176. The monument was built in 1969 and contains an artillery anti-tank gun, a flagpole, and an engraved granite monument listing residents of the town who died in war. Plans were made in 2015 to relocate the memorial to Kracklauer Park in the south of the town but were abandoned after public backlash.

=== Community Protestant Church ===
The Community Protestant Church in Mundelein first opened in 1889 with 16 members. The initial building for the church was built on the junction of Illinois Route 176 and U.S. Route 45 in 1896. The church moved to its current position in 1949 and was nicknamed "the church on the hill" due to its location. The building was renovated from 1957 to 1958 to build an education wing, including a library and a nursery. The church hosted an annual Christmas dance in the 1940s.

=== Fremont Public Library ===
Fremont Public Library was established on Park Street and Lake Street in the village in 1955, before later being moved to a larger site on Midlothian Road in 2001. The old site, which was previously used as a barbershop, was sold to Mundelein Elementary School District 75 where it has been used as an administration building. The property was considered for a sale in 2018.

=== Village Hall ===
The current village hall was completed and opened in 2014. The building is a 10-acre, 32,000-foot building located next to the Metra station in the center of the town, and cost over $10 million to build.

The original village hall, which was built and dedicated in 1929, cost the village $36,000 to construct. The building, which was described as "Tudor-style" and "Alpine-style", was also previously used as a fire station, municipal jail, and a community center. The building was demolished in 2019 for commercial development.

=== Model Farm ===
Model Farm was a prototype farm used to demonstrate new farming technology in the 1920s. The property included a six-room farmhouse and an exhibit hall. The 80-acre farm was opened in 1928 by the Public Service Company of Northern Illinois, which was a company run by businessman Samuel Insull. The property was sold to a cattle breeder in 1940 and was partially used as the site for the construction of Mundelein High School.

== Events ==
Mundelein hosts an annual four-day event called the Mundelein Community Days for recreation around Independence Day. Events have included carnivals, live music, parades, and beauty pageants.

=== Races ===
Annually on Independence Day, a 5K run called the Freedom Classic 5K is held. The race was first held in 1979.

Mundelein hosts an annual amateur and professional bike race called the Mundelein Grand Prix. The race is part of the Intelligentsia Cup Chicago series. The race was first held in 2021.

== Economy ==
Top employers

According to Mundelein's 2022 comprehensive annual financial report, the top employers in the village are:

2022
| # | Employer | Type of Business | # of Employees | % Village Pop. (Note: Village population: 31,560) |
|---|---|---|---|---|
| 1 | Medline Industries | Hospital supplies | 639 | 2.02% |
| 2 | Ruprecht Company | Meat processing | 552 | 1.75% |
| 3 | University of Saint Mary of the Lake | Seminary / School for the priesthood | 295 | 0.93% |
| 4 | Amcor Flexibles Healthcare, Inc. | Flexible polyethylene packaging | 290 | 0.92% |
| 5 | Maclean-Fogg Co. | Industrial fasteners (plants and offices) | 288 | 0.91% |
| 6 | Mundelein High School #120 | Public high school | 270 | 0.86% |
| 7 | Mundelein Elementary School #75 | Public elementary school | 239 | 0.76% |
| 8 | Village of Mundelein | Village government | 194 | 0.61% |
| 9 | Pet Factory | | 175 | 0.55% |
| 10 | Con-Way Freight | | 92 | 0.29% |
| Total | | | 3,034 | |

== Education ==
The first school in Mundelein was called Mechanics Grove School and opened in 1837. The school was located on the roads that would become Maple Avenue and Route 176. Mundelein is currently served by five elementary school districts.

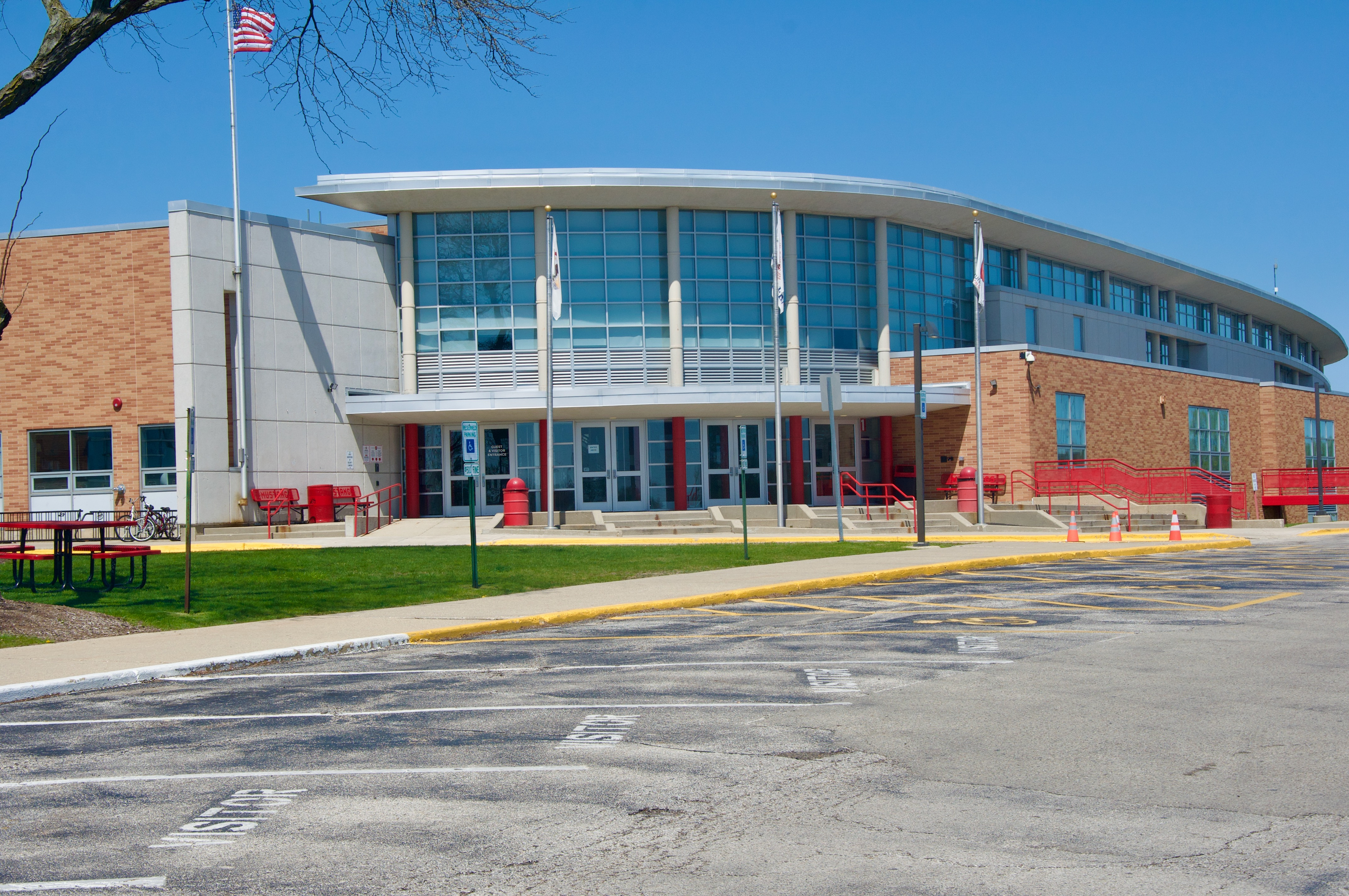
Mundelein High School main entrance

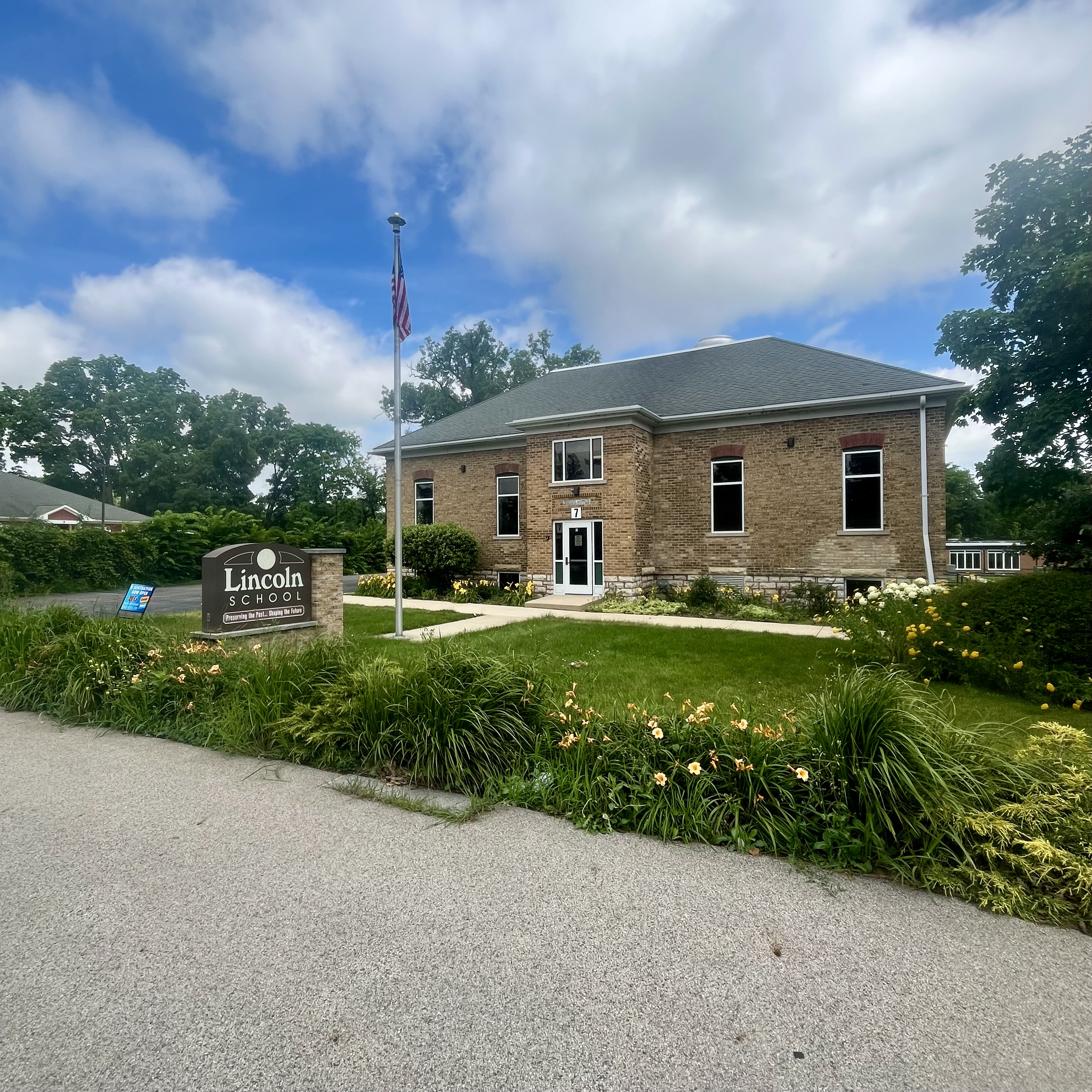
Lincoln School, which is now a preschool

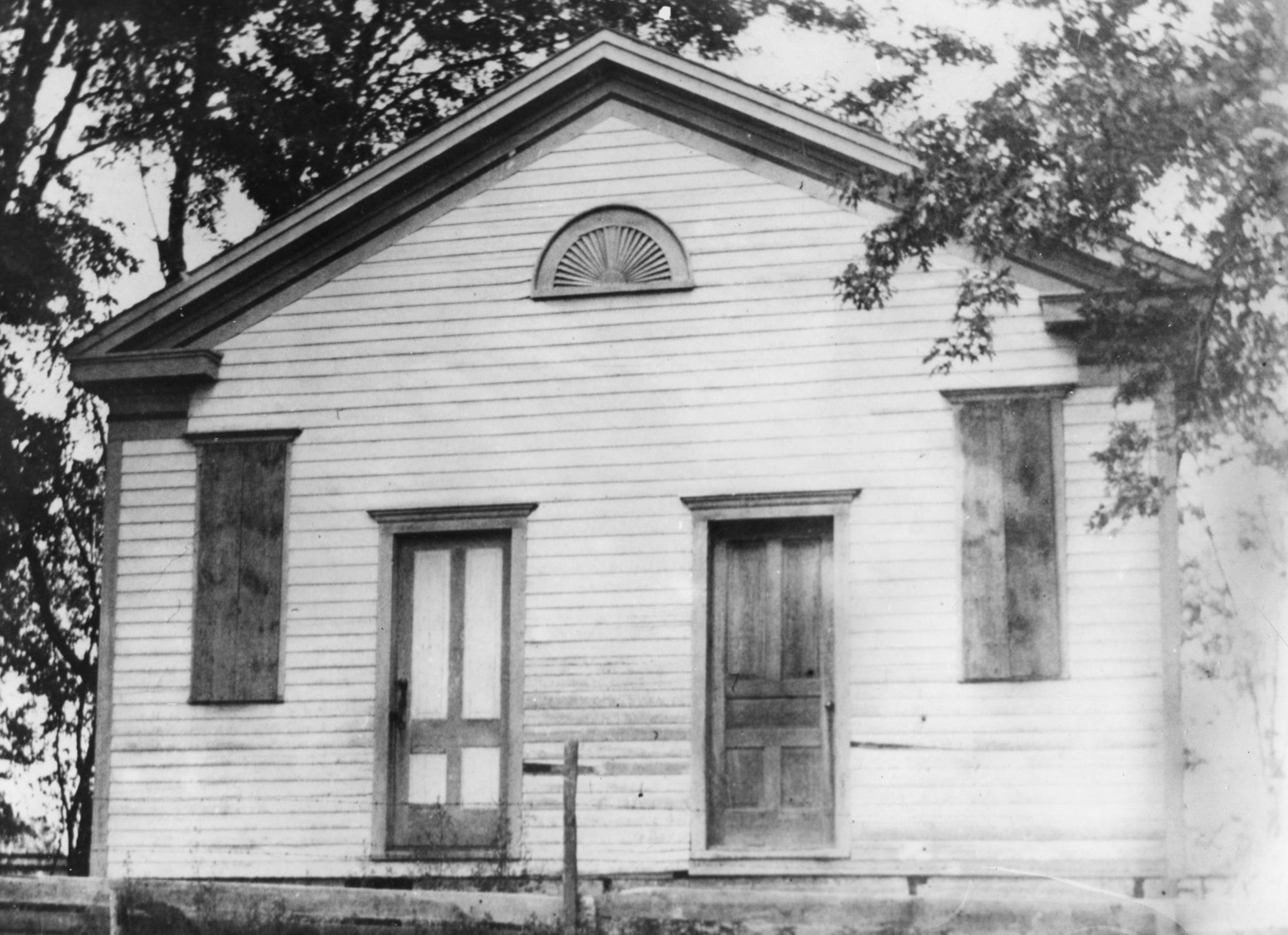
The original Mechanics Grove School

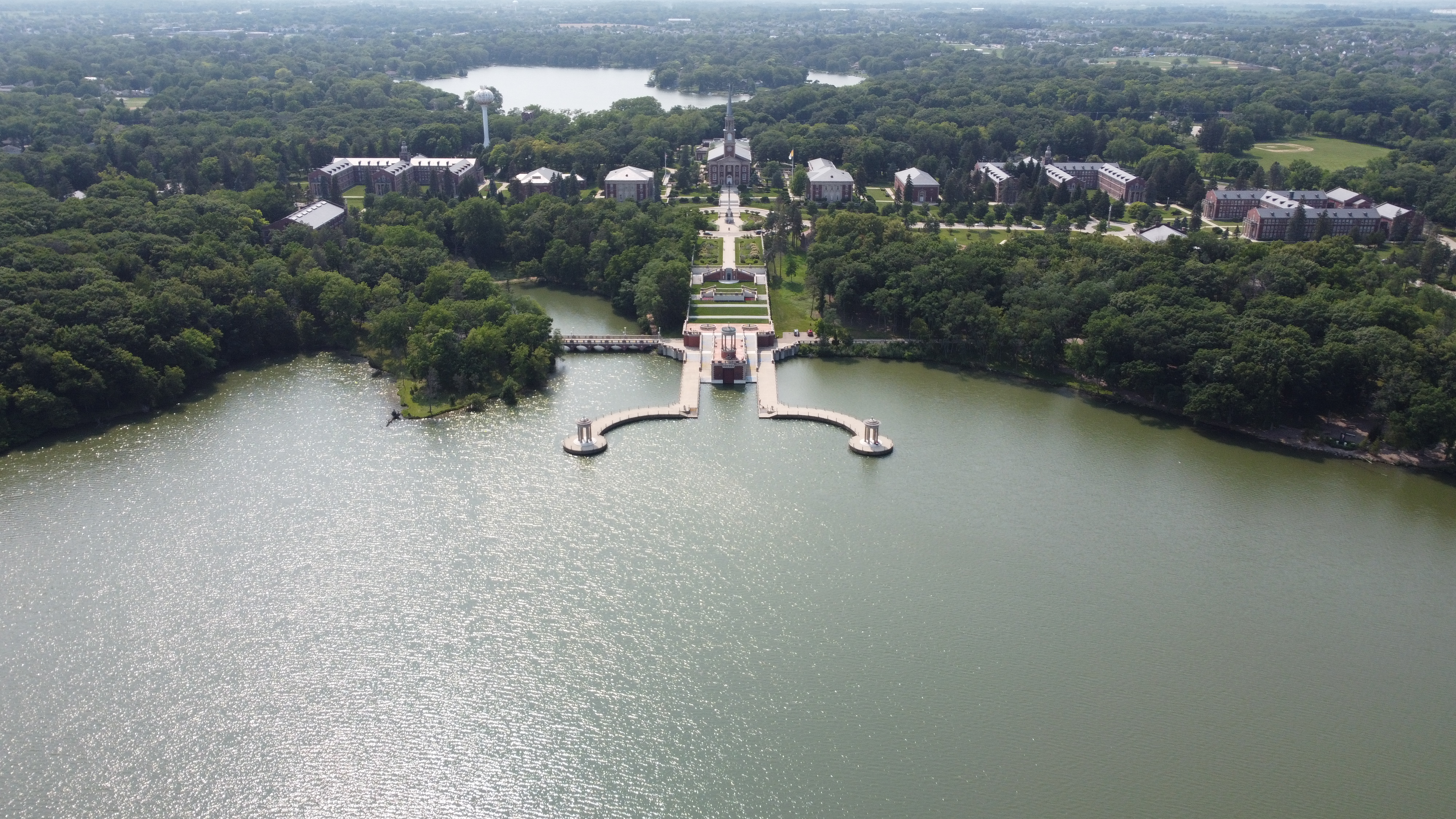
University of Saint Mary of the Lake

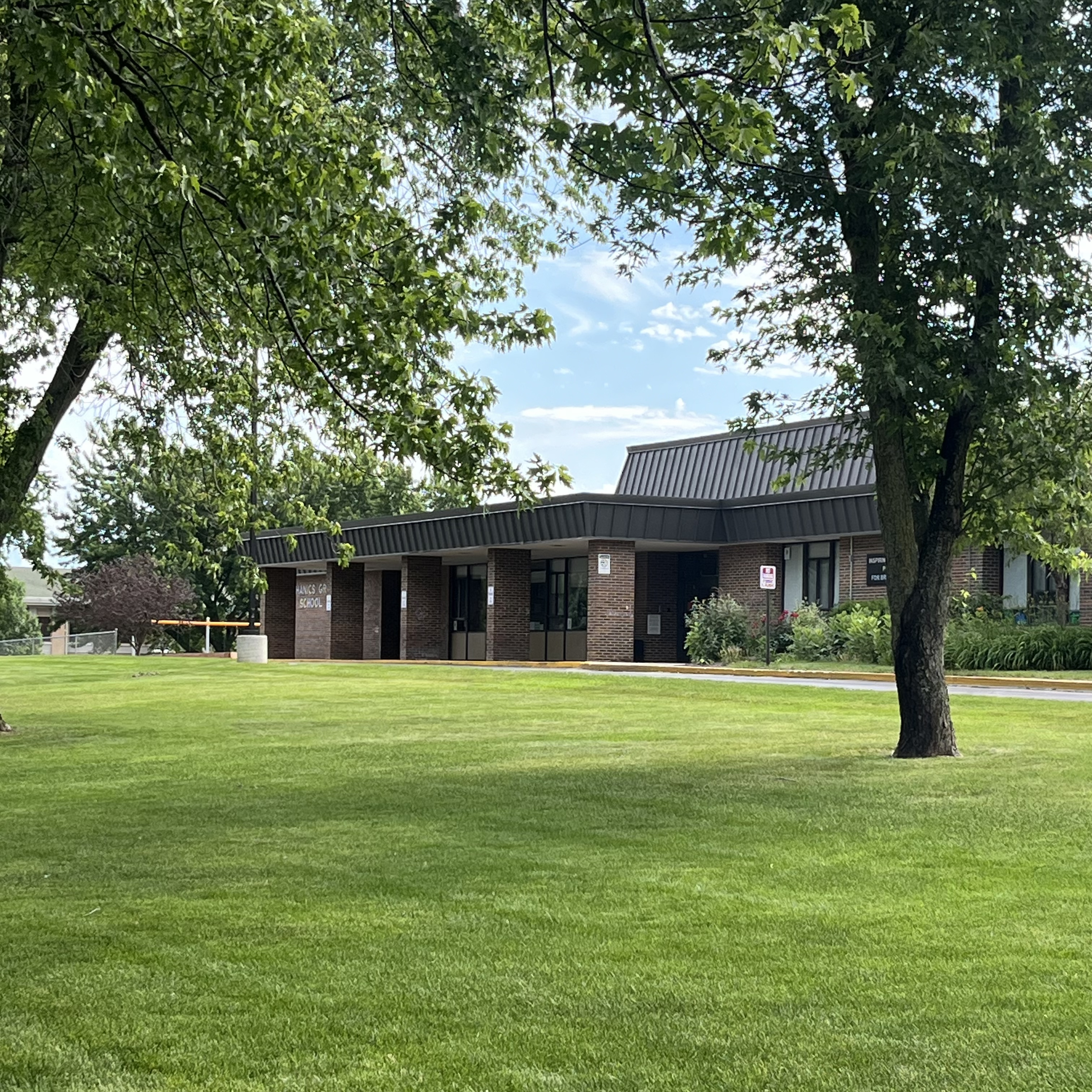
The current Mechanics Grove School

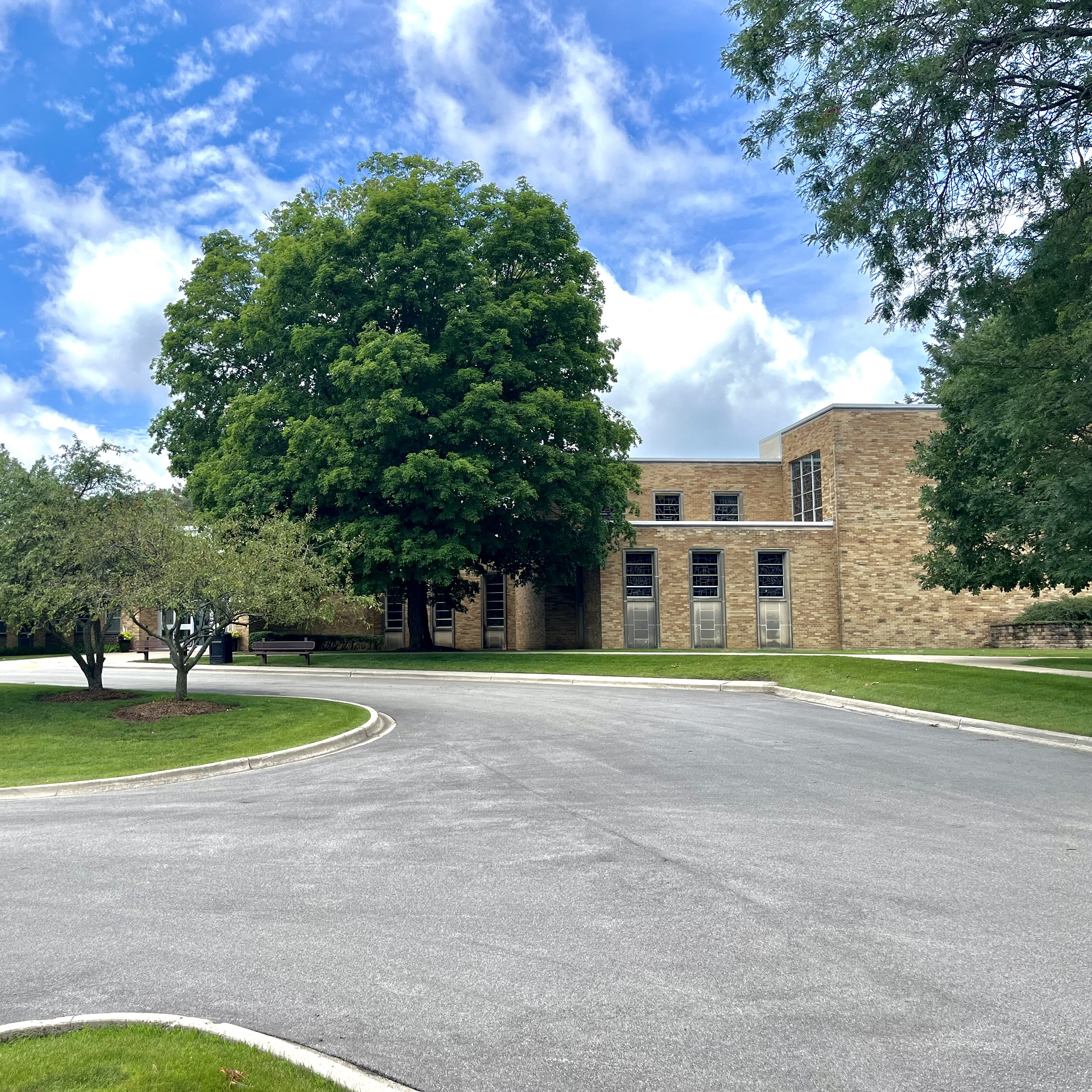
Carmel High School

=== Public schools ===
For the history see Arthur Zilversmit, Changing schools: Progressive education theory and practice, 1930-1960 (University of Chicago Press, 1993).

==== Diamond Lake School District 76 ====
Diamond Lake School District was established in 1847. The district includes three schools: Diamond Lake school from kindergarten through second grade, West Oak Elementary Schools from third to fifth grade, and West Oak Middle School from grades six to eight. Fairhaven School was previously a part of the district, and is now a special education school.

==== Fremont School District 79 ====
Fremont School District 79 (previously Fremont Center District 79) includes Fremont Elementary School, Fremont Intermediate School, and Fremont Middle School. The District annexed Ivanhoe School District 77, Swan School District 78, Maple Grove School District 80, and Murray School District 81 in 1955.

==== Hawthorn Community Consolidated School District 73 ====
Hawthorn Community Consolidated School District 73 primarily serves the nearby village of Vernon Hills. The school district contains four elementary schools, two middle schools, and a bilingual school.

==== Libertyville School District 70 ====
Libertyville's school district was founded c. 1850. The school district includes four elementary schools: Adler Park School, Butterfield School, Copeland Manor School, Rockland School, and one middle school (Highland Middle School).

==== Mundelein Elementary School District 75 ====
Mundelein School District was founded with the establishment of Lincoln School in 1894. The school district comprises Washington Early Learning Center from Kindergarten to second grade, which opened in 1951, Mechanics Grove Elementary School from third to fifth grade, which opened in 1970, and Carl Sandburg Middle School from sixth through eighth grade, which is named after American writer Carl Sandburg who dedicated the building in 1959.

The district's boundary changed significantly in 2003–2004, in response to studies indicating sharp disparities in ethnic makeup among various schools in the district.

==== Mundelein High School ====
The public high school for Mundelein is Mundelein High School. It was built in 1960 and started classes in 1961 and split its own school district in 1964. The campus was renovated in 1987, 1997, and 2016.

=== Private Schools ===
==== University of Saint Mary of the Lake ====
University of Saint Mary of the Lake is a seminary in Mundelein. The seminary was designed by architect Joseph W. McCarthy. The charter for the school was initially granted in 1844, and the first version of the school was opened in Chicago. The seminary closed in 1866 due to financial problems, and the building was destroyed in 1871 in the Great Chicago Fire. The Archdiocese of Chicago started purchasing land in Mundelein in 1915, and the school opened in 1921. The seminary is the third largest employer in the village,. The village namesake, George Mundelein, is buried in the Chapel of the Immaculate Conception on campus.

==== Carmel High School ====
Carmel High School is a private Catholic high school in Mundelein. The site of the school was formerly occupied by a railroad terminal for the 28th International Eucharistic Congress. Carmel High School for boys opened in 1962, and the sister school Carmel High School for girls opened in 1963. The schools merged in 1988.

==== Santa Maria del Popolo School ====
Santa Maria del Popolo School previously served as a private Catholic school. The four-room school opened in 1950 with 187 enrolled students. The Roman Catholic Archdiocese of Chicago announced the closure of the school in January 2014, which by then only enrolled approximately 80 students. The school was previously a K–8 school, and later, an elementary school.

== Transportation ==
=== Public transportation ===
Mundelein has a station on Metra's North Central Service, which provides weekday rail service between Antioch and Chicago Union Station. The station opened in 1996 after a thirty-three-year hiatus after commuter rail service was shut down in 1963. The tracks that the North Central Service ran on were bought out by CN in 2001 after the railway acquired Wisconsin Central Ltd.

Pace provides bus services on Route 574 connecting Mundelein to Grayslake, Vernon Hills, and other destinations.

The town is near Milwaukee Mitchell International Airport, O'Hare International Airport, and Midway International Airport.

=== Major streets ===
- Lake Street
- Illinois Route 60
- Illinois Route 83
- Maple Avenue
- Midlothian Road
- Hawley Street

Interstate 94 is located five miles east of Mundelein.

== Media ==
The Chicago Tribune provides coverage for Mundelein, and runs the local newspaper Mundelein Review through its ownership of Pioneer Press. Mundelein is also provided news coverage by Daily Herald, based in Arlington Heights, Illinois, and FOX 32 Chicago.

== Notable people ==
- Cardinal George Mundelein, the namesake of the town, died of coronary thrombosis in his Mundelein residence in 1939

=== Sports ===
- Zaire Barnes, American football linebacker for the New York Jets
- Ryan Borucki, professional baseball pitcher
- Charlie Campbell, soccer player
- Courtney Frerichs, track and field athlete and Olympic medalist
- Tõnis Kasemets, Estonian racing driver
- Johnny McCarthy, professional baseball first baseman
- Sean McGrath, American football tight end and coach
- Brienne Minor, American tennis player
- Bud O'Rourke, professional basketball forward
- Andy Sabados, American football guard

=== Politics ===
- Al Salvi, former member of the Illinois House, US Senate candidate, managing partner of Salvi & Maher, LLC
- Penny Bernard Schaber, former member of the Wisconsin State Assembly
- Ed Sullivan Jr., Republican politician

== Works cited ==
- Killackey, Shawn P (2009). Mundelein. Arcadia Publishing. ISBN 978-0-7385-7732-6
