= Illinois Route 63 =

State highway in the Chicago metropolitan area of Illinois, US

Illinois Route 63
- Former IL 63 (latest) highlighted in red

Route information
- Length: 32.3 mi (52.0 km)
- Existed: 1929–1973

Major junctions
- Southwest end: IL 72 in East Dundee
- US 14 in Barrington; US 12 in Lake Zurich; US 45 in Mundelein; I-94 Toll in Gurnee
- Northeast end: US 41 in Gurnee

Location
- Country: United States
- State: Illinois
- Counties: Kane, Cook, Lake

Highway system
- Illinois State Highway System; Interstate; US; State; Tollways; Scenic
← IL 62	→ I-64

Illinois Route 63 (IL 63) was an east–west state highway in the Chicago metropolitan area. At its latest routing, it traveled from Illinois Route 72 (IL 72) in East Dundee to US 41 in Gurnee.

== Route description ==
At its latest routing, IL 63 started to travel northeast from IL 72 in East Dundee. In under one mile (1.6 km), it then intersected IL 25. Continuing northeast, it then briefly ran concurrently with IL 62 in Barrington Hills. Then, it ran concurrently with IL 59 all the way towards IL 22 in North Barrington. Meanwhile, they intersected IL 68, also in Barrington Hills, and then US 14 in Barrington. After intersecting IL 22, IL 63 turned eastward, running concurrently with IL 22 and intersecting with US 12 before leaving the concurrency. At this point, the route turned northeast along Midlothian Road. In Mundelein, IL 63 turned east via IL 176 before turning north via IL 21 in Libertyville. IL 21 then branched northwest to Grayslake as they intersected IL 137. IL 63 alone then met IL 120 at a parclo, I-94 at an incomplete diamond interchange, and IL 132 at an intersection before it intersected at US 41. At this point, the route ended there.

== History ==
Initially, in 1929, IL 63 traveled from Chicago to East Dundee mostly via present-day IL 72 and then to Barrington via parts of present-day IL 68 and IL 59. In 1932, IL 63 was extended north along present-day IL 59 from US 12/IL 19 (now US 14) in Barrington to IL 22 in North Barrington. By 1934, US 14's eastern extension was established to travel along several state routes (including IL 63) in order to get to Chicago. In 1935, IL 63's Dundee–Chicago connection was removed in favor of US 14. By 1939, IL 63 was extended northeast roughly along present-day Illinois Route 22 (from North Barrington to Lake Zurich), Midlothian Road (from Lake Zurich to Mundelein), Illinois Route 176 (from Mundelein to Libertyville), and Illinois Route 21 (from Libertyville to Gurnee). This resulted in the decommissioning of Illinois Route 172 between US 45 (now IL 137) in Libertyville to IL 68 (now US 41) in Gurnee. In 1973, without any significant changes to the routing since 1939, the routing was removed.

== Major intersections ==
County	Location	mi	km	Destinations	Notes
Kane	East Dundee	0.0	0.0	IL 72 (Main Street)	Southwestern terminus
Kane	East Dundee–Carpentersville line	1.0	1.6	IL 25 (Dundee Avenue)	
Cook	Barrington Hills	5.1	8.2	IL 62 west (Algonquin Road) / Brinker Road	Southwestern end of IL 62 concurrency
Cook	Barrington Hills			IL 62 east (Algonquin Road) / IL 59 south	Northeastern end of IL 62 concurrency; southwestern end of IL 59 concurrency
Cook	Barrington Hills	7.1	11.4	IL 68 east (Dundee Road)	Former western terminus of IL 68; now extended westward via IL 63 to East Dundee
Lake	Barrington	8.9	14.3	US 14 (Northwest Highway)	
Lake	North Barrington	12.4	20.0	IL 59 north (Hough Street) / IL 22 west	Northeastern end of IL 59 concurrency; southwestern end of IL 22 concurrency
Lake	Lake Zurich	15.8	25.4	US 12 (Rand Road)	
Lake	Lake Zurich	19.8	31.9	IL 22 east (Main Street)	Northeastern end of IL 22 (pre-downtown bypass) concurrency
Lake	Mundelein	23.2	37.3	IL 60 (Townline Road) / IL 83	
Lake	Mundelein	24.2	38.9	IL 176 west (Maple Avenue)	Southwestern end of IL 176 concurrency
Lake	Mundelein			US 45 (Lake Street)	
Lake	Libertyville	26.3	42.3	IL 176 east (Park Avenue) / IL 21 south (Milwaukee Avenue)	Northeastern end of IL 176 concurrency; southwestern end of IL 21 concurrency
Lake	Libertyville			IL 21 north / IL 137 east (Peterson Road/Buckley Road)	Northeastern end of IL 21 concurrency; IL 21 now follows along former IL 63 to Gurnee
Lake	Gurnee	33.3	53.6	IL 120 (Belvidere Road) to I-94 Toll east	Parclo interchange
Lake	Gurnee			I-94 Toll west (Tri-State Tollway)	No access to I-94 eastbound and from I-94 westbound
Lake	Gurnee			IL 132 (Grand Avenue)	
Lake	Gurnee			US 41 (Skokie Highway)	Northeastern terminus
1.000 mi = 1.609 km; 1.000 km = 0.621 mi: Concurrency terminus; Incomplete access	Gurnee				
