= Dempster Street =

Street in Chicago, Illinois, U.S.

- Thacker Street; 8800 North
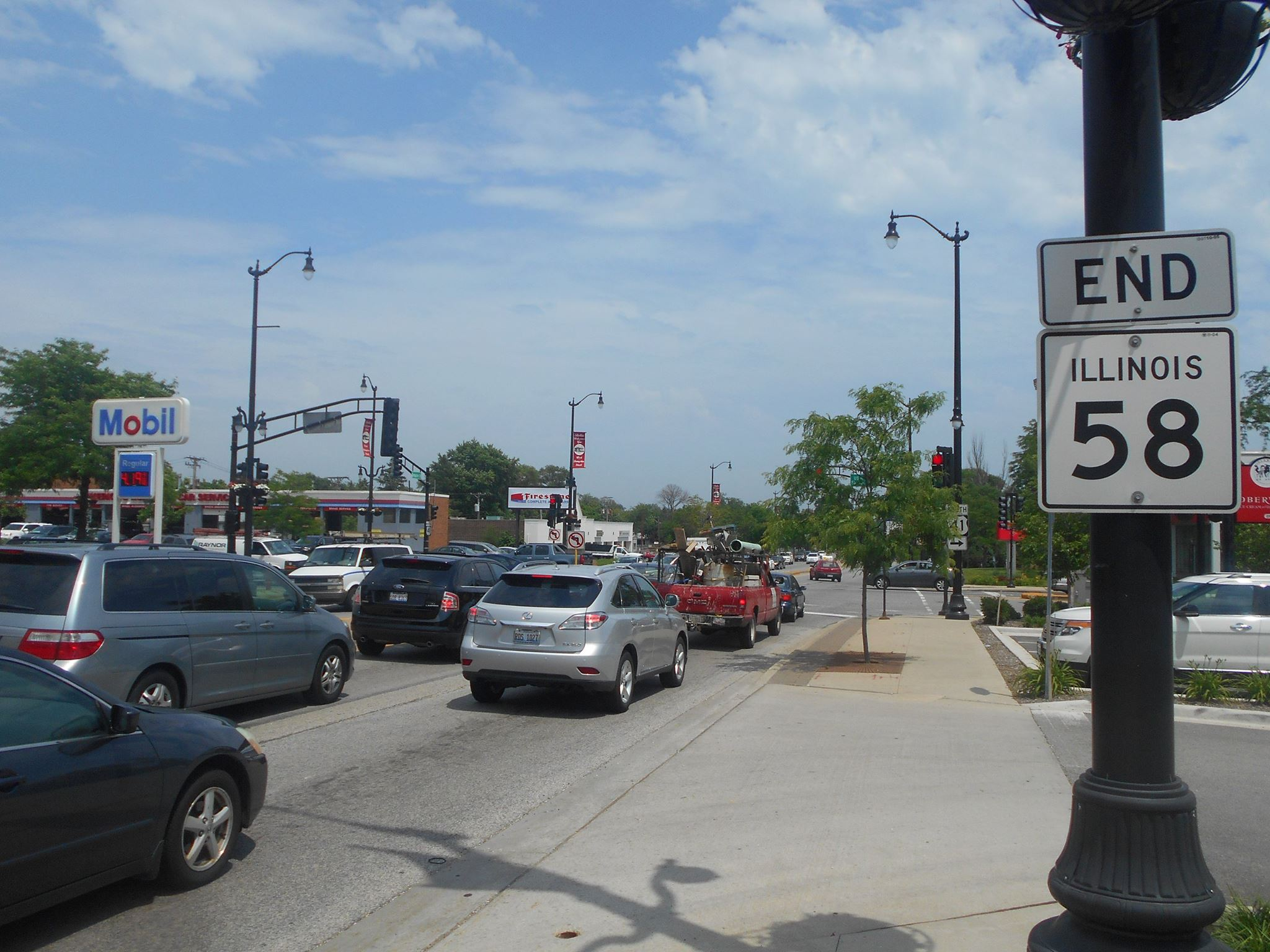
- IL 58 ending at Dempster Street/Skokie Boulevard
- Part of: US 14 / IL 58
- Length: 4.19 miles (6.74 km) (western segment); 10.35 miles (16.66 km) (eastern segment); 14.54 miles (23.40 km) (total)
- Location: Chicago
- West end: IL 62 (Algonquin Road) in Mount Prospect
- East end: cul-de-sac just west of Lake Michigan in Evanston

Dempster Street is a major east–west street in the northern suburbs of Chicago. It is assigned 8800 North in the Chicago address system, being located 11 miles (18 km) north of Madison Street.

The road begins at Illinois Route 62 (Algonquin Road) in Mount Prospect. From there, it goes east and enters Des Plaines, where it intersects Illinois Route 83 (Elmhurst Road). At Mount Prospect Road in Des Plaines, Dempster Street becomes Thacker Street until the eastern end of its western segment at Des Plaines River Road in Des Plaines. Just west of its east end, Thacker Street intersects U.S. Routes 12 and 45.

Dempster Street resumes at Rand Road and Interstate 294 (Tri-State Tollway) in Des Plaines and Park Ridge. At this point, U.S. Route 14 joins the road. Dempster Street, as well as U.S. Route 14, continues west as Miner Street. In Niles and Park Ridge, the road intersects Cumberland Avenue and Illinois Route 21 (Milwaukee Avenue). In Morton Grove, Harlem Avenue intersects U.S. Route 14. At Waukegan Road in Morton Grove, U.S. Route 14 goes south, following Illinois Route 43. U.S. Route 14 splits just south of here and becomes Caldwell Avenue. It is also at this point that Dempster Street picks up Illinois Route 58. Illinois Route 58 continues north on Waukegan Road. Further east into Skokie, Dempster Street intersects Interstate 94 (Edens Expressway) as well as U.S. Route 41 (Skokie Boulevard). Illinois Route 58 ends at U.S. Route 41. While still in Skokie, the road intersects Crawford Avenue. The road then enters Evanston and intersects Ridge Avenue. Dempster Street finally ends at a cul-de-sac at the shores of Lake Michigan in Evanston.

== Major intersections ==
The entire route is in Cook County.

Location	mi	km	Destinations	Notes
Arlington Heights–Mt. Prospect line	0.0	0.0	IL 62 (Algonquin Road)	Western terminus
Mt. Prospect–Des Plaines line	1.2	1.9	IL 83 (Elmhurst Road)	
Des Plaines	3.7	6.0	US 12 east / US 45 south (Graceland Avenue)	
Des Plaines	3.8	6.1	US 12 west / US 45 north (Mannheim Road / Lee Street)	
Des Plaines	4.2	6.8	River Road	
Des Plaines	4.2	6.8	Gap in route	
Des Plaines	4.2	6.8	Northwest Highway / Rand Road / US 14 west (Miner Street)	Western end of US 14 concurrency
Des Plaines–Park Ridge line	4.3	6.9	I-294 Toll south (Tri-State Tollway)	No exit to I-294 northbound; no entrance from I-294 southbound
Niles	6.6	10.6	IL 21 (Milwaukee Avenue)	Interchange
Morton Grove	7.9	12.7	US 14 east / IL 43 / IL 58 west (Waukegan Road)	Eastern end of US 14 concurrency; western end of IL 58 concurrency
Morton Grove–Skokie line	9.7	15.6	I-94 (Edens Expressway)	
Skokie	10.6	17.1	US 41 (Skokie Boulevard) / IL 58 ends	Eastern end of IL 58; eastern terminus of IL 58
Evanston	14.6	23.5	Cul-de-sac west of Lake Michigan	Eastern terminus
1.000 mi = 1.609 km; 1.000 km = 0.621 mi: Concurrency terminus; Incomplete access
