= Illinois Route 131 =

State highway in Lake County, Illinois, US

Illinois Route 131
- Green Bay Road
- IL 131 highlighted in red

Route information
- Maintained by IDOT
- Length: 15.15 mi (24.38 km)
- Existed: 1938–present

Major junctions
- South end: IL 176 in Lake Bluff
- North end: WIS 31 / CR A1 in Winthrop Harbor

Location
- Country: United States
- State: Illinois
- Counties: Lake

Highway system
- Illinois State Highway System; Interstate; US; State; Tollways; Scenic
← IL 130	→ IL 132

Illinois Route 131 (IL 131) is a north–south state route in northeastern Illinois. It extends south from Wisconsin Highway 31 and Lake CR A1/19 (128th Street) at the Illinois/Wisconsin state line by Pleasant Prairie, south to Illinois Route 176 in Lake Bluff, a distance of 15.15 miles (24.38 km).

== Route description ==
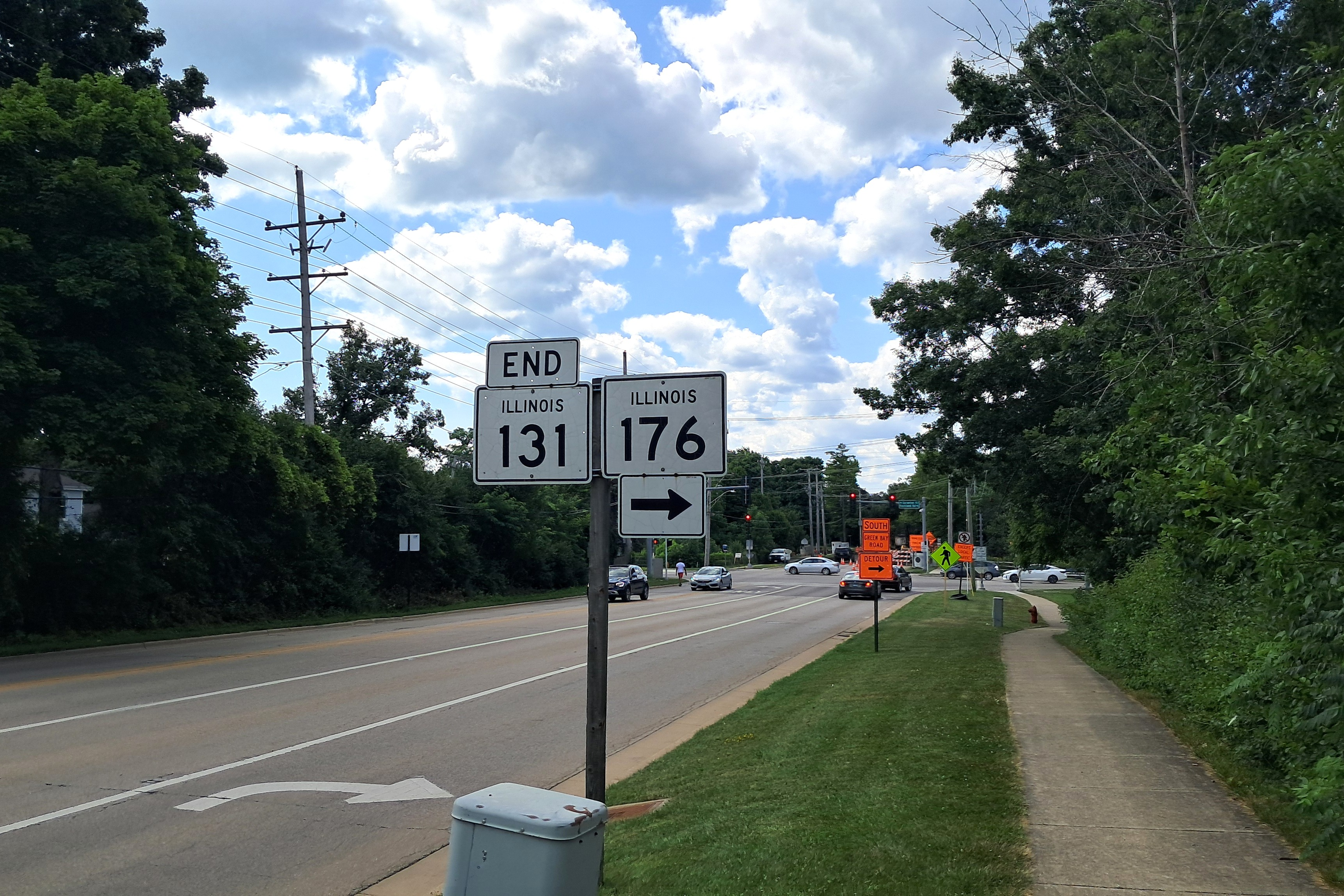
IL 131 at its southern terminus

Illinois 131 is called Green Bay Road for its entire length, but Green Bay Road becomes a residential street and extends south through various North Shore communities to Evanston, a distance of approximately 20 miles (32 km) south of Illinois 176. It is one of very few state routes whose named road is longer than the marked state road. Green Bay Road actually continues south to Old Elm Road (Lake CR 52) while there is a second segment of Green Bay Road that starts at a dead end in Highwood and ends at Ridge Avenue in Evanston. The Green Bay Road name also stretches continuously through Racine County and Kenosha County, WI, with route signage changing to Wisconsin Highway 31, before merging with Wisconsin Highway 32 north of Racine. However, other large portions of the formerly continuous Green Bay Road still bear the name, such as Green Bay Avenue in Milwaukee and several Green Bay Road segments in Ozaukee County.

The road parallels U.S. Route 41 (Skokie Highway), which is only a few miles to the west, and Illinois Route 137 (Amstutz Expressway), which is only a few miles to the east. It is the major north–south road between those two expressways.

== History ==
SBI Route 131 ran from Mattoon to Greenup in southeastern Illinois. This was dropped in 1937 for Illinois Route 121. The next year, Illinois 131 was used on a road that extended Highway 31 south into Illinois. This had formerly been Illinois Route 68. Had Illinois 31 not already been in use, the road south of Wisconsin may have been designated Illinois 31 instead.

== Major Intersections ==
The entire route is in Lake County.

Location	mi	km	Destinations	Notes
Lake Bluff	0.0	0.0	IL 176 west (Rockland Rd)	Southern terminus of IL 131; eastern terminus of IL 176
North Chicago	2.0	3.2	IL 137 (Buckley Rd)	
Waukegan	5.0	8.0	IL 120 west (Belvidere Rd)	Eastern terminus of IL 120
Waukegan	6.5	10.5	IL 132 west (Grand Ave)	Eastern terminus of IL 132
Zion	13.1	21.1	IL 173 (Rosecrans Rd)	
Zion	15.15	24.38	WIS 31	Wisconsin state line; northern terminus of IL 131
1.000 mi = 1.609 km; 1.000 km = 0.621 mi
