= Illinois Route 137 =

State highway in Lake County, Illinois, US

Illinois Route 137
- Buckley Road; Sheridan Road
- IL 137 highlighted in red

Route information
- Maintained by IDOT
- Length: 23.49 mi (37.80 km)
- Existed: 1953–present
- Tourist routes: Lake Michigan Circle Tour

Major junctions
- West end: IL 83 in Grayslake
- US 45 in Libertyville; I-94 in Green Oaks; US 41 in North Chicago
- North end: WIS 32 / CR A1 in Winthrop Harbor

Location
- Country: United States
- State: Illinois
- Counties: Lake

Highway system
- Illinois State Highway System; Interstate; US; State; Tollways; Scenic
← IL 136	→ IL 138

Illinois Route 137 (IL 137) is a 23.49-mile-long (37.80 km) state highway in northeast Illinois. It runs from the Wisconsin state line north of Winthrop Harbor south to North Chicago, west to Libertyville, and then back northwest to Grayslake, terminating at IL 83 just south of IL 120.

The eastern portion of IL 137 carries part of the Amstutz Expressway, a short freeway between downtown Waukegan and Lake Michigan.

== Route description ==
IL 137 is called Buckley Road in the northwest-southeast segment, as well as the east–west segment east of IL 21 (Milwaukee Avenue). Between these segments, in northern Libertyville, business addresses use Peterson Road. However, street signs name it Buckley Road, which continues west as IL 137 turns northwest. In North Chicago, at the east end of the Buckley Road alignment, the route turns north where it cuts Naval Station Great Lakes into two areas, and becomes Sheridan Road for most of its remaining length to the Wisconsin state line. The exception is the Amstutz Expressway (a short, limited-access road in downtown Waukegan), which runs from Sheridan Road near the southern border of Waukegan to Greenwood Avenue roughly two miles (3.2 km) north, where the expressway abruptly ends; IL 137 follows Greenwood Avenue west a short distance back to Sheridan Road and continues north through Beach Park, Zion, and Winthrop Harbor before terminating at the state line. Sheridan Road continues north as Wisconsin WIS 32.

== History ==
IL 137 was first established in 1928. It ran from IL 1 to St. Francisville, resembling a spur route of IL 1. In 1929, the easternmost portion of IL 137 (from St. Francisville to Indiana state line) was removed. In 1936, without any significant changes to the routing, the designation was removed.

IL 137 was established again in 1953, running from IL 21/IL 63 (now just IL 21) to IL 42 (now Sheridan Road) along its present-day routing. In 1973, one year after the decommissioning of IL 42, IL 137 was cut back from Sheridan Road to IL 131. By 1975, IL 63 was decommissioned, resulting in IL 21 rerouting away from Grayslake and into Gurnee. IL 137 was promptly extended to take the place of the former alignment of IL 21. By 1979, the Amstutz Expressway opened between Grand Avenue and Greenwood Avenue. However, the expressway was not signed upon opening. By 1992, IL 137 was extended north to WIS 32 at the Wisconsin state line. The extension traveled along former IL 42, the Amstutz Expressway, and part of IL 173 from Zion to Winthrop Harbor.

=== Amstutz Expressway ===
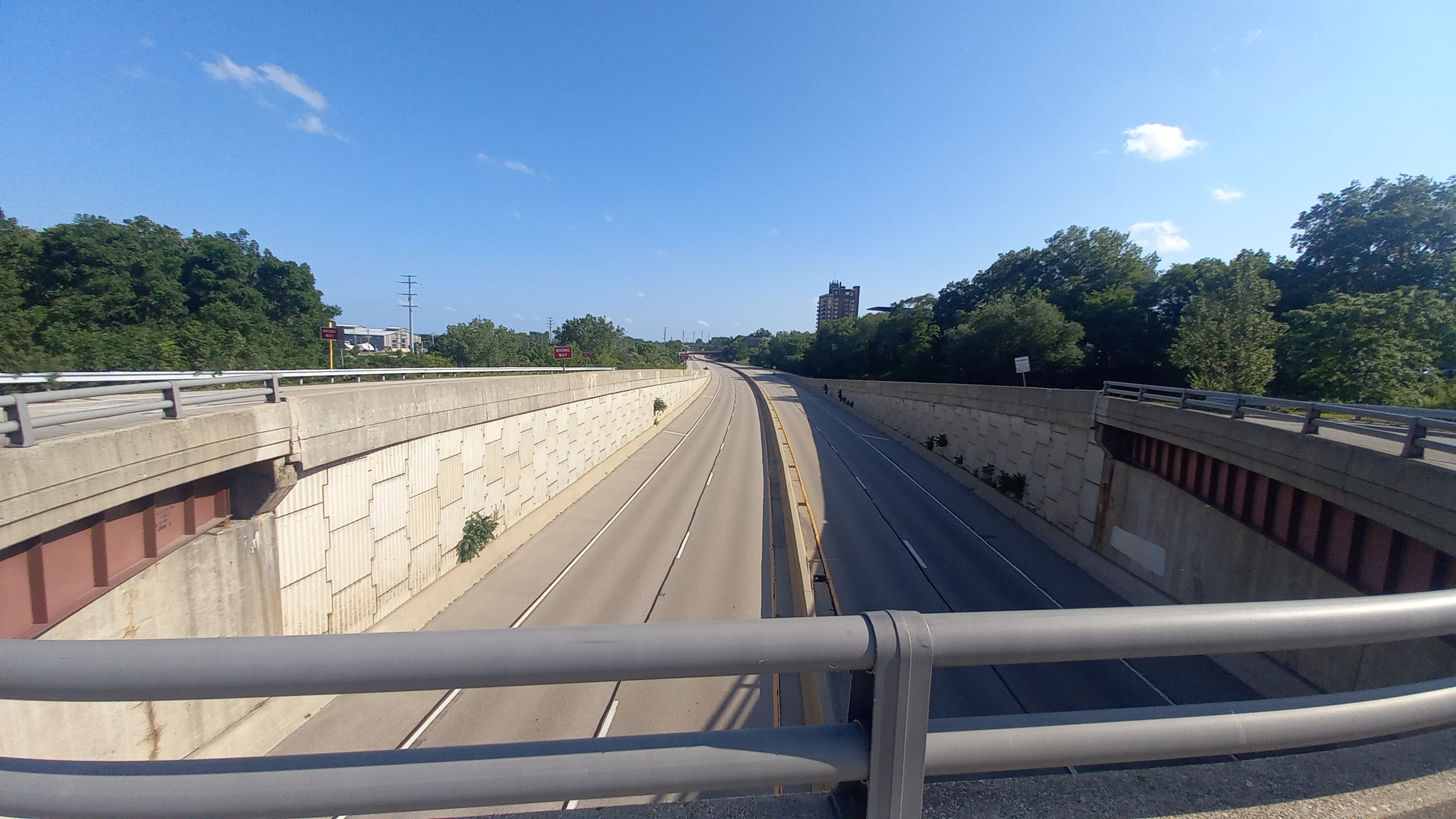
South view of the Amstutz Expressway at Grand Avenue

The Amstutz Expressway was built in the 1970s in an attempt to ease traffic in Waukegan’s downtown area, but is now also known as the "road to nowhere." The 2.9-mile (4.7 km), four-lane highway was intended to be a connecting route for the downtown area, but a critical link through the neighboring village of North Chicago was never built, and the factories that the expressway was designed to serve have since closed. Today, the thoroughfare carries fewer than 15,000 vehicles per day. Because it is used so little, this short stretch of highway has been the setting for filming such movies and television programs as Groundhog Day, The Blues Brothers, The Ice Harvest, Batman Begins, and Chicago Fire.

At one point, the expressway was proposed to extend south from Grand Avenue to I-94 (Tri-State Tollway); the extension was designated as Federal-Aid Primary (FAP) 437. At that time, the expressway ended at Grand Avenue. However, the expressway was only extended south to Genesee Street in 1992.

In the early 2000s, proposals were made to remove the expressway, thus narrowing the space needed for roadway, and then moving the nearby railroad right-of-way to the unused expressway land as part of a revitalization project for the lakefront area. IL 137 follows the entire length of the expressway, and received this designation in 1994 when IL 137 was extended north to the Wisconsin state line.

The Amstutz Expressway was named after Mel Amstutz, a former Lake County Highway Superintendent. In 2007, legislation was pending in the Illinois General Assembly to rename the expressway, Bobby Thompson Expressway, after the former mayor of North Chicago. The bill received unanimous support in the Illinois House of Representatives, but has not yet been voted on by the Illinois Senate. This name change took effect in 2010.

== Major intersections ==
The entire route is in Lake County.

Location	mi	km	Destinations	Notes
Grayslake	0.0	0.0	IL 83	
	1.8	2.9	US 45	Interchange
Libertyville			Peterson Road – Lake County Fairgrounds	Westbound exit and eastbound entrance; interchange
Libertyville	4.3	6.9	IL 21 (Milwaukee Avenue)	
Green Oaks	7.3	11.7	I-94 Toll (Tri-State Tollway) – Wisconsin, Indiana	I-94 exit 13
Green Oaks–North Chicago line	7.9	12.7	IL 43 (Waukegan Road)	
North Chicago	8.7	14.0	US 41 (Skokie Highway)	
North Chicago	9.5	15.3	IL 131 (Green Bay Road)	
North Chicago			Buckley Road east to Sheridan Road	IL 137 changes from east–west to north–south
North Chicago			24th Street	Interchange; no northbound entrance
Waukegan			Genesee Street (Sheridan Road)	Southern end of freeway
Waukegan			Grand Avenue	Interchange; former IL 132 west
Waukegan			Greenwood Avenue east	Northern end of freeway
Zion	21.3	34.3	IL 173 west (21st Street, 173rd Airborne Brigade Highway)	
Winthrop Harbor	23.49	37.80	WIS 32 north / LMCT CR A1 west (Russell Road)	Wisconsin state line
1.000 mi = 1.609 km; 1.000 km = 0.621 mi: Incomplete access
