= IL-21 =

IL-21 or IL 21 can refer to:

- Interleukin 21
- Illinois's 21st congressional district, an obsolete district
- Illinois Route 21
