= Illinois Route 43 =

North-south state highway in Illinois, US

Illinois Route 43
- IL 43 highlighted in red

Route information
- Maintained by IDOT and CDOT
- Length: 60.30 mi (97.04 km)
- Existed: 1967–present

Major junctions
- South end: US 30 in Frankfort
- I-80 in Tinley Park; US 6 in Orland Park; US 12 / US 20 in Bridgeview; I-55 in Summit; US 34 in Berwyn; I-290 / IL 110 (CKC) in Oak Park; I-90 in Chicago; US 14 / IL 58 in Morton Grove; I-94 Toll in Northbrook
- North end: US 41 / IL 120 in Park City

Location
- Country: United States
- State: Illinois
- Counties: Will, Cook, Lake

Highway system
- Illinois State Highway System; Interstate; US; State; Tollways; Scenic
← IL 42	→ US 45

Illinois Route 43 (IL 43) is a 60.30-mile-long (97.04 km) major north–south state highway in the U.S. state of Illinois. It runs from U.S. Route 30 (US 30) in Frankfort north to the large intersection of IL 120 (Belvidere Road) and US 41 (Skokie Highway) in Waukegan.

== Route description ==
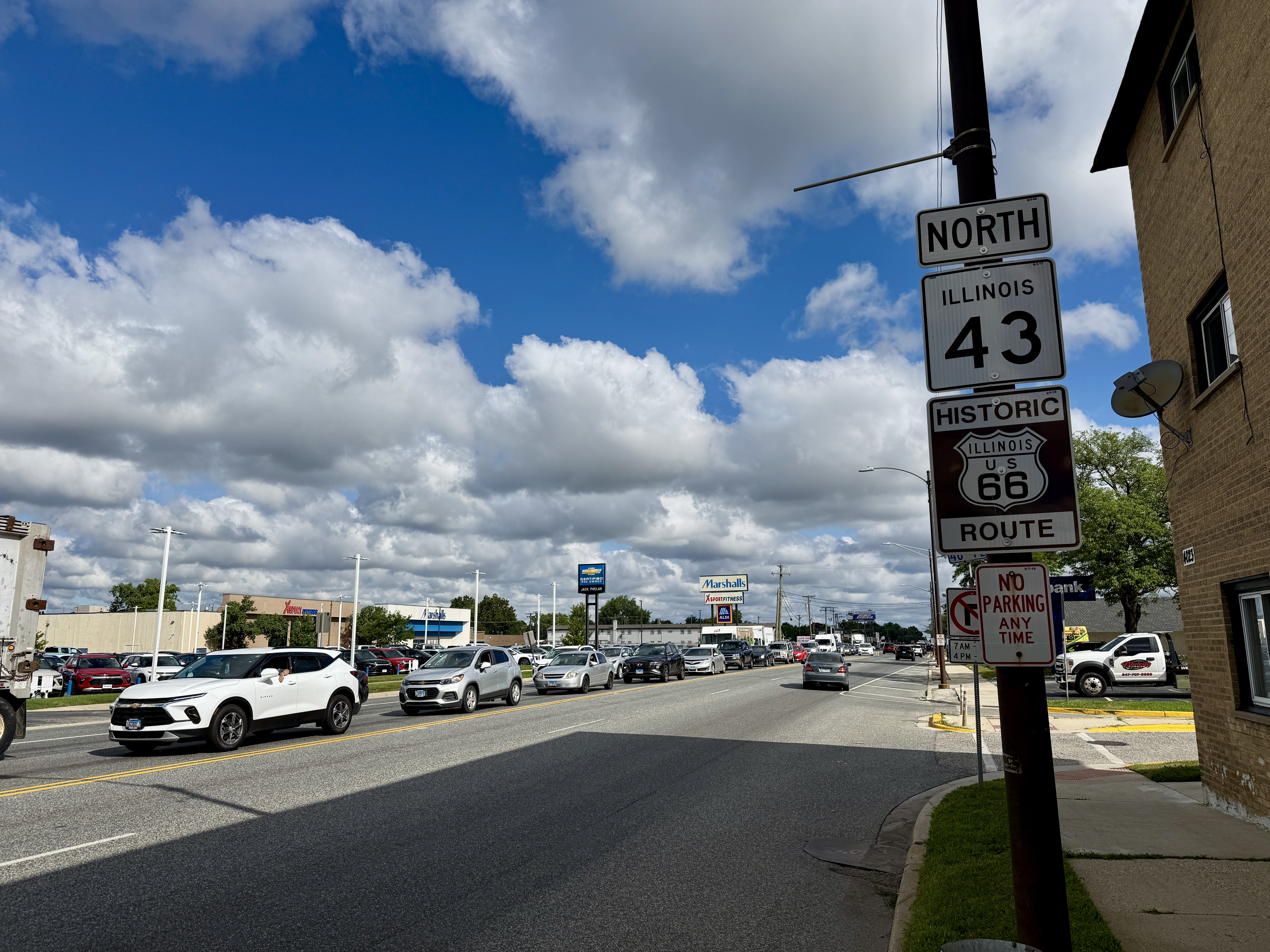
IL 43 northbound in Stickney

IL 43 is called Waukegan Road for the first 20 miles (32 km) until its intersection with Oakton Street in Niles; it then follows that road west one block until it turns back south and remains Harlem Avenue for the duration. When IL 50 begins in Skokie and IL 171 begins in Chicago, it parallels those routes for much of the rest of its length. It enters, exits, and runs parallel to Chicago limits several times, passing through or parallel to Edison Park, Norwood Park, Dunning, Montclare, and Austin on the Northwest Side then Garfield Ridge and Clearing on the Southwest Side. Listed as 7200 West in the Chicago address system, it is one of seven state roads that travel through the city of Chicago.

== History ==
IL 43 was originally part of what is now US 136 and IL 10 from Havana to Mason City. By 1935, IL 43 was moved to what is now IL 4 from Olive Township to Oraville. By 1964, IL 4 supplanted all of IL 43. In 1967, Illinois Route 42A, which originally followed Waukegan Road and Harlem Avenue, was decommissioned and was replaced by IL 43.

In Deerfield, IL 43 is designated a Blue Star Memorial Highway.

== Major intersections ==
County	Location	mi	km	Destinations	Notes
Will–Cook county line	Frankfort	0.00	0.00	US 30 / Lincoln Highway	Road continue south as Harlem Avenue
Will–Cook county line	Tinley Park	3.1	5.0	I-80 – Joliet, Gary	I-80 exit 148
Cook	Orland Park–Tinley Park line	6.6	10.6	US 6 (159th Street)	
Cook	Palos Heights	11.7	18.8	IL 83 (119th Street, College Drive)	
Cook	Worth	13.3	21.4	IL 7 south (Southwest Highway)	Northern terminus of IL 7
Cook	Bridgeview	14.7	23.7	US 12 / US 20 (95th Street) to I-294 Toll	Interchange
Cook	Forest View	20.4	32.8	I-55 (Stevenson Expressway)	I-55 exit 283
Cook	Lyons	21.6	34.8	Historic US 66 west (Joliet Road)	Southern end of Historic US 66 concurrency
Cook	Riverside	22.1	35.6	US 34 west / Historic US 66 east (Ogden Avenue)	Northern end of Historic US 66 concurrency; eastern terminus of US 34
Cook	Forest Park	25.5	41.0	I-290 / IL 110 (CKC) (Eisenhower Expressway)	I-290 exit 21B
Cook	River Forest	27.9	44.9	IL 64 (North Avenue)	
Cook	Chicago	31.0	49.9	IL 19 (Irving Park Road)	
Cook	Chicago	33.0	53.1	IL 72 west (Higgins Avenue)	Eastern terminus of IL 72
Cook	Chicago	33.1	53.3	I-90 (Kennedy Expressway)	I-90 exit 81A
Cook	Niles	35.5	57.1	IL 21 north (Milwaukee Avenue)	Southern terminus of IL 21
Cook	Morton Grove	37.0	59.5	US 14 east (Caldwell Avenue)	Southern end of US 14 concurrency
Cook	Morton Grove	37.3	60.0	US 14 west / IL 58 east (Dempster Street)	Northern end of US 14 concurrency; southern end of IL 58 concurrency
Cook	Morton Grove	38.3	61.6	IL 58 west (Golf Road, Evanston-Elgin Road)	Northern end of IL 58 concurrency
Cook	Northbrook	44.5	71.6	IL 68 (Dundee Road)	
Cook	Northbrook	45.0	72.4	I-94 Toll west (Edens Spur) – Milwaukee	No direct access from I-94 west or to I-94 east
Lake	Bannockburn	49.2	79.2	IL 22 (Half Day Road)	
Lake	Lake Forest	52.1	83.8	IL 60 (Kennedy Road)	
Lake	Lake Bluff	54.9	88.4	IL 176 (Rockland Road)	
Lake	North Chicago	57.1	91.9	IL 137 (Buckley Road)	
Lake	Park City	60.30	97.04	US 41 north (Skokie Highway) / IL 120 (Belvidere Road) – Grayslake	IL 120: Southbound exit and northbound entrance; US 41: Northbound exit and southbound entrance
1.000 mi = 1.609 km; 1.000 km = 0.621 mi: Concurrency terminus; Incomplete access
