= Illinois Route 60 =

State highway in Lake County, Illinois, US

Illinois Route 60
- Town Line Road; Kennedy Road
- IL 60 highlighted in red

Route information
- Maintained by IDOT
- Length: 17.22 mi (27.71 km)
- Existed: February 1967–present

Major junctions
- West end: IL 120 in Volo
- US 45 in Mundelein I-94 Toll in Lake Forest
- East end: US 41 in Lake Forest

Location
- Country: United States
- State: Illinois
- Counties: Lake

Highway system
- Illinois State Highway System; Interstate; US; State; Tollways; Scenic
← US 60	→ IL 61

Illinois Route 60 (IL 60) is a 17.22-mile-long (27.71 km) east–west state highway in Lake County, in northeastern Illinois. It connects the village of Volo at Illinois Route 120 (Belvidere Road) just east of Illinois Route 59 with the city of Lake Forest at U.S. Highway 41 (Skokie Highway).

== Route description ==
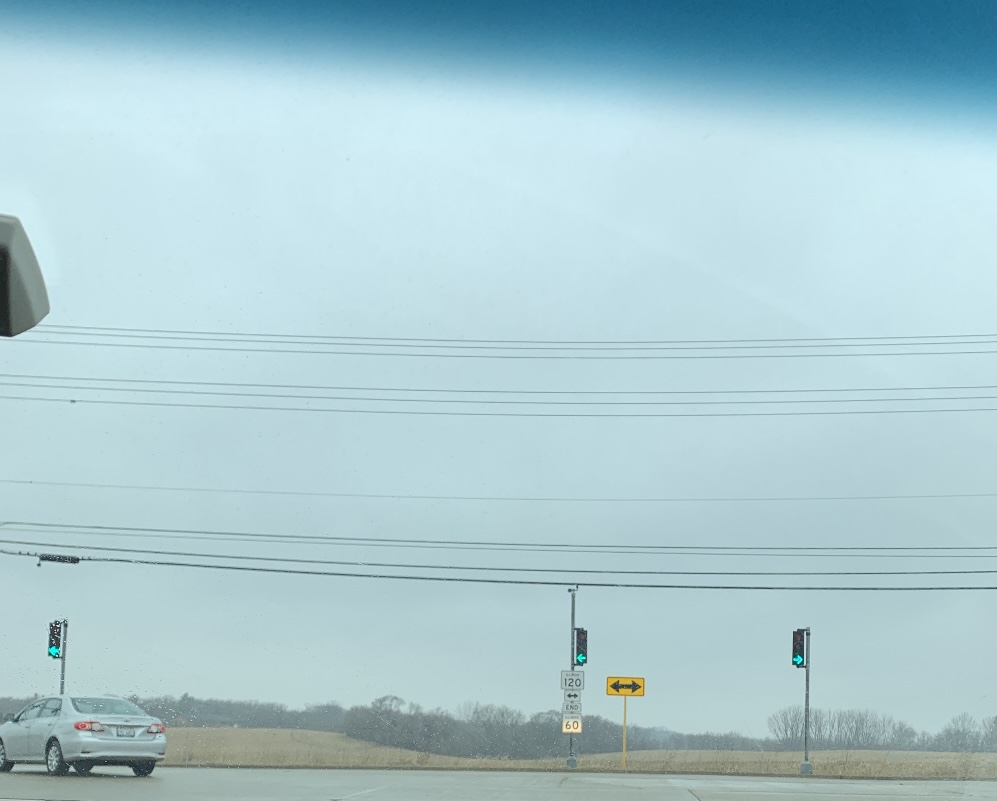
Illinois Route 60’s Northern Terminus at IL 120

Illinois 60's northern terminus is at a T-intersection in Volo with Illinois 120. It runs southeast as a 2-lane road serving a mixture of farmland and suburban neighborhoods in Grayslake and Round Lake. Running south through Mundelein, the roadbed begins to carry Illinois 83 just north of an intersection with Illinois 176.

Illinois 60 overlaps with Illinois Route 83 south of Ivanhoe where Illinois 83 curves around U.S. Route 45. It is called Town Line Road east of Illinois 83 and west of the Tri-State Tollway (Interstate 94), because Illinois 60 straddles the line separating Vernon and Libertyville Townships for most of its length.

Through Vernon Hills, Illinois 60 serves as a major arterial route for traffic from Interstate 94 to access the village's expansive retail and residential areas. Through Lake Forest to the east, Route 60 is called Kennedy Road.

Route 60, especially the portion between Milwaukee Avenue and Interstate 94 in Mettawa, experiences unusually heavy traffic for an arterial road, although less so in recent years.

== History ==
SBI Route 60 ran from the original alignment of US 12 in Richmond to Chicago via the present alignment of US 12, Rand Road/Northwest Highway, Touhy Avenue, and US 14. This was removed in 1938 to accommodate the realignment of US 12 and US 14 as well as the addition of US 12 City. In February 1967, IL 60 was brought back to replace IL 59A as part of replacing some superfluous designations. In 1972, IL 60 was removed east of US 41 due to the decommissioning of IL 42.

== Major intersections ==
The entire route is in Lake County.

Location	mi	km	Destinations	Notes
Volo	0.00	0.00	IL 120 (Belvidere Road)	Western terminus of IL 60
Mundelein	6.7	10.8	IL 83 north	Western end of concurrency with IL 83
Mundelein	6.8	10.9	IL 176 (Maple Avenue)	
Vernon Hills	10.2	16.4	IL 83 south	Eastern end of concurrency with IL 83
Vernon Hills	10.5	16.9	US 45 (Lake Street)	
Vernon Hills	13.1	21.1	IL 21 (Milwaukee Avenue)	
Mettawa	15.3	24.6	I-94 Toll (Tri-State Tollway) – Indiana, Wisconsin	I-94 exit 19
Lake Forest	16.8	27.0	IL 43 (Waukegan Road)	
Lake Forest	17.22	27.71	US 41 (Skokie Highway)	Eastern terminus of IL 60
1.000 mi = 1.609 km; 1.000 km = 0.621 mi: Concurrency terminus
