= Illinois Route 176 =

State highway in northern Illinois, US

Illinois Route 176
- IL 176 highlighted in red

Route information
- Maintained by IDOT
- Length: 41.28 mi (66.43 km)
- Existed: 1926–present

Major junctions
- West end: IL 23 in Marengo
- US 14 in Crystal Lake; IL 31 in Crystal Lake; US 12 / IL 59 in Wauconda; US 45 in Mundelein; I-94 Toll in Green Oaks; US 41 in Lake Bluff
- East end: IL 131 in Lake Bluff

Location
- Country: United States
- State: Illinois
- Counties: McHenry, Lake

Highway system
- Illinois State Highway System; Interstate; US; State; Tollways; Scenic
| ← IL 175 | → IL 177 |
| ← US 67 | → IL 68 |

Illinois Route 176 (IL 176) is a 41.28-mile-long (66.43 km) east–west state route in northern Illinois. It runs from IL 23 (State Street) in Marengo to the southern terminus of IL 131 (Green Bay Road) in Lake Bluff.

== Route description ==
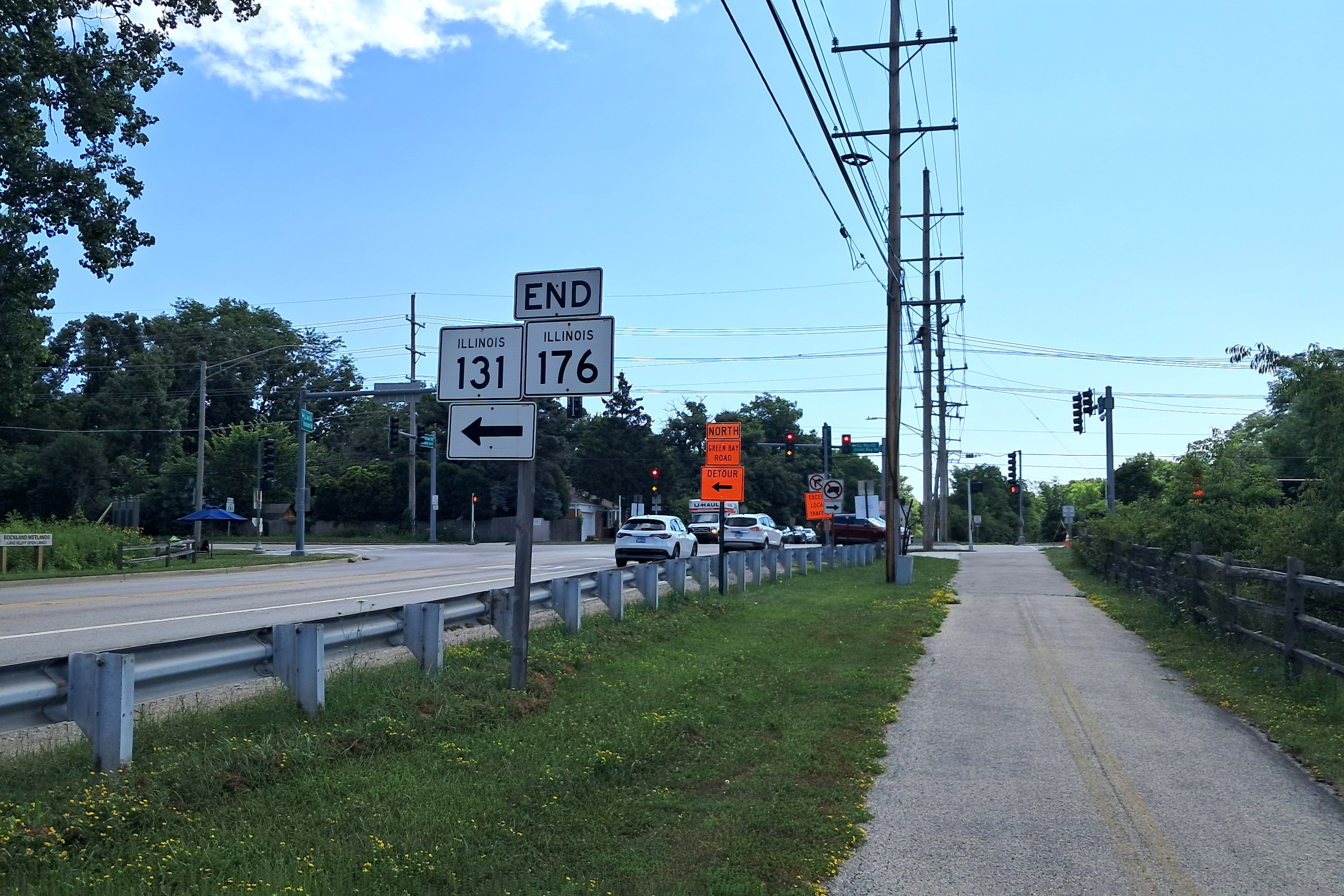
IL 176 at its eastern terminus

IL 176 is a two- to four-lane arterial in northern Illinois. The eastern terminus of IL 176 is unique in that both IL 131 and IL 176 terminate at that corner; neither state route extends beyond that point in any direction.

IL 47 overlaps IL 176 east of Marengo.

== History ==
SBI Route 176 originally ran from Crystal Lake to Lake Bluff. In 1941, the designation was extended westward to Marengo, replacing IL 67, redundant to the newly-designated US 67.

== Future ==
The village of Wauconda hired an engineering firm in 2014 to suggest improvements to the congested interchange with US 12. They proposed eliminating the interchange and converting it to an at-grade intersection with dual left turn lanes at each leg, two lanes in each direction for IL 176, three lanes in each direction of US 12, and developing the frontage of the intersection. The estimated cost to convert the US 12 interchange with IL 176 and the US 12 interchange with IL 59 to at-grade signalized arterial intersections is $300 million, none of which would come from IDOT.

== Major Intersections ==
| County | Location | mi | km | Destinations | Notes |
|---|---|---|---|---|---|
| McHenry | Marengo | 0.0 | 0.0 | IL 23 (State St) to US 20 | Western terminus of IL 176 |
| McHenry | | 9.0 | 14.5 | IL 47 north – Woodstock | West end of IL 47 concurrency |
| McHenry | Woodstock | 9.8 | 15.8 | IL 47 south – Huntley | East end of IL 47 concurrency |
| McHenry | Crystal Lake | 13.8 | 22.2 | US 14 (Virginia St) – Woodstock | |
| McHenry | Crystal Lake | 16.8 | 27.0 | IL 31 | |
| Lake | Wauconda | 25.2 | 40.6 | US 12 / IL 59 (Rand Rd) | interchange |
| Lake | Mundelein | 31.4 | 50.5 | IL 60 / IL 83 | |
| Lake | Mundelein | 33.3 | 53.6 | US 45 (Lake St) | |
| Lake | Libertyville | 36.1 | 58.1 | IL 21 (Milwaukee Ave) | |
| Lake | Green Oaks | 38.3 | 61.6 | I-94 Toll east (Tri-State Tollway) – Indiana | No access to I-94 west or from I-94 east; I-94 exit 16 |
| Lake | Lake Bluff | 40.0 | 64.4 | IL 43 (Waukegan Rd) | |
| Lake | Lake Bluff | 40.3 | 64.9 | US 41 (Skokie Hwy) | |
| Lake | Lake Bluff | 41.28 | 66.43 | IL 131 north (Green Bay Rd) | Eastern terminus of IL 176; southern terminus of IL 131 |
1.000 mi = 1.609 km; 1.000 km = 0.621 mi: Concurrency terminus; Incomplete access
