= Illinois Route 132 =

State highway in Lake County, Illinois, US

Illinois Route 132
- Grand Avenue
- IL 132 highlighted in red

Route information
- Maintained by IDOT
- Length: 13.57 mi (21.84 km)
- Existed: 1950–present

Major junctions
- West end: IL 59 in Lake Villa
- US 45 in Lindenhurst I-94 Toll in Gurnee; US 41 in Gurnee
- East end: IL 131 in Waukegan

Location
- Country: United States
- State: Illinois
- Counties: Lake

Highway system
- Illinois State Highway System; Interstate; US; State; Tollways; Scenic
← IL 131	→ IL 133

Illinois Route 132 (IL 132) is an arterial state route that connects IL 59 at the village line between Fox Lake Hills and Lake Villa, with IL 131 in Waukegan. It is known as Grand Avenue for its entire length, and Grand Avenue extends west beyond Lindenhurst to near U.S. Route 12 (US 12), 12 miles (19 km) west. Though IL 132 is one of the busiest state highways in Illinois, it is only 13.57 miles (21.84 km) long (21.83 km).

== Route description ==
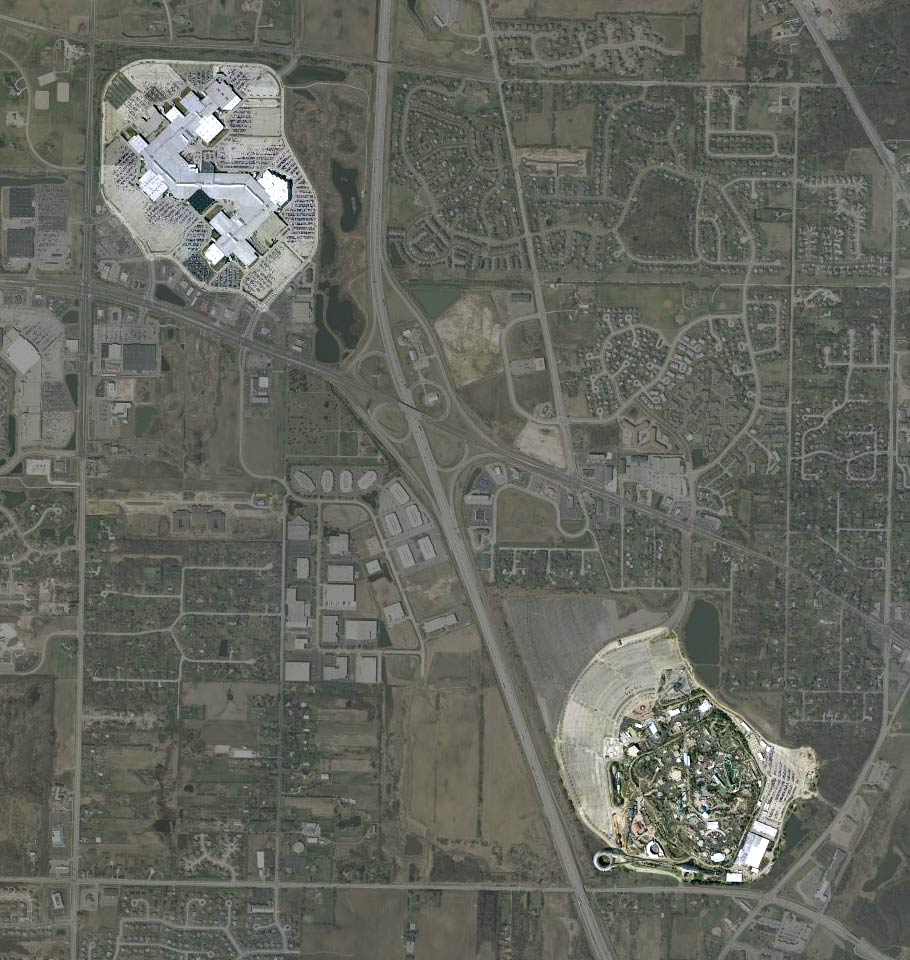
The intersection of Interstate 94 and Illinois 132. Gurnee Mills and Six Flags are highlighted.

Illinois 132 serves the town of Gurnee. Grand Avenue is the main road to both the Gurnee Mills Shopping Center and Six Flags Great America. At this point Illinois 132 is a divided, six lane road—its length wavers between 2 and 6 lanes around Gurnee.

Because Route 132 is a well-traveled road in suburban Chicago, it is also a major suburban Chicago shopping and industry corridor, especially on the Grand Avenue section of the route. A variety of car dealers, retail stores, full-service restaurants, mid-range hotels, etc. are located on this roadway.

== History ==
SBI Route 132 was initially what is now Illinois Route 121 from Decatur to Mattoon in central Illinois; in 1937, Illinois 121 replaced Illinois 131 and Illinois 132. In 1950 it was reassigned to the whole stretch of Grand Avenue; in 1967 it was dropped east of Illinois 131 and west of Illinois Route 59.

== Major intersections ==
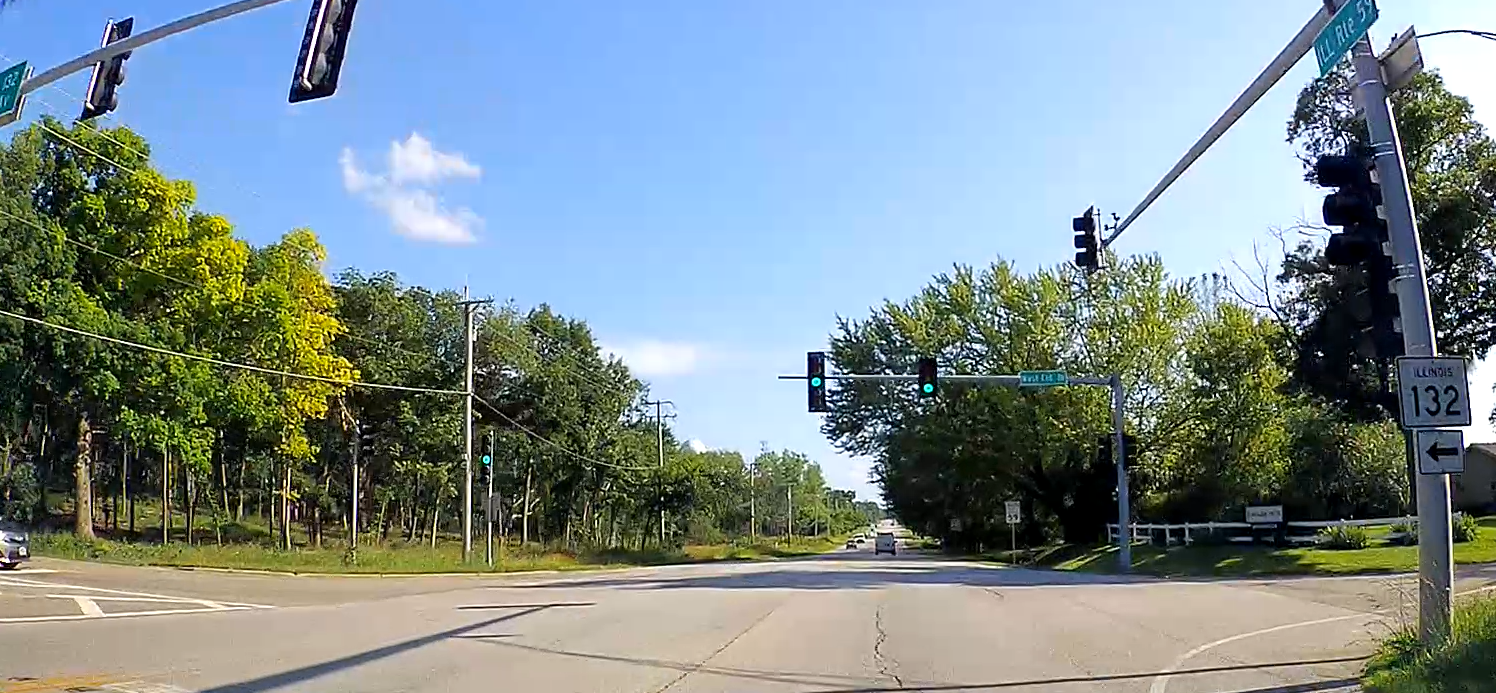
Illinois 132's Western Terminus, seen from its intersection with IL 59

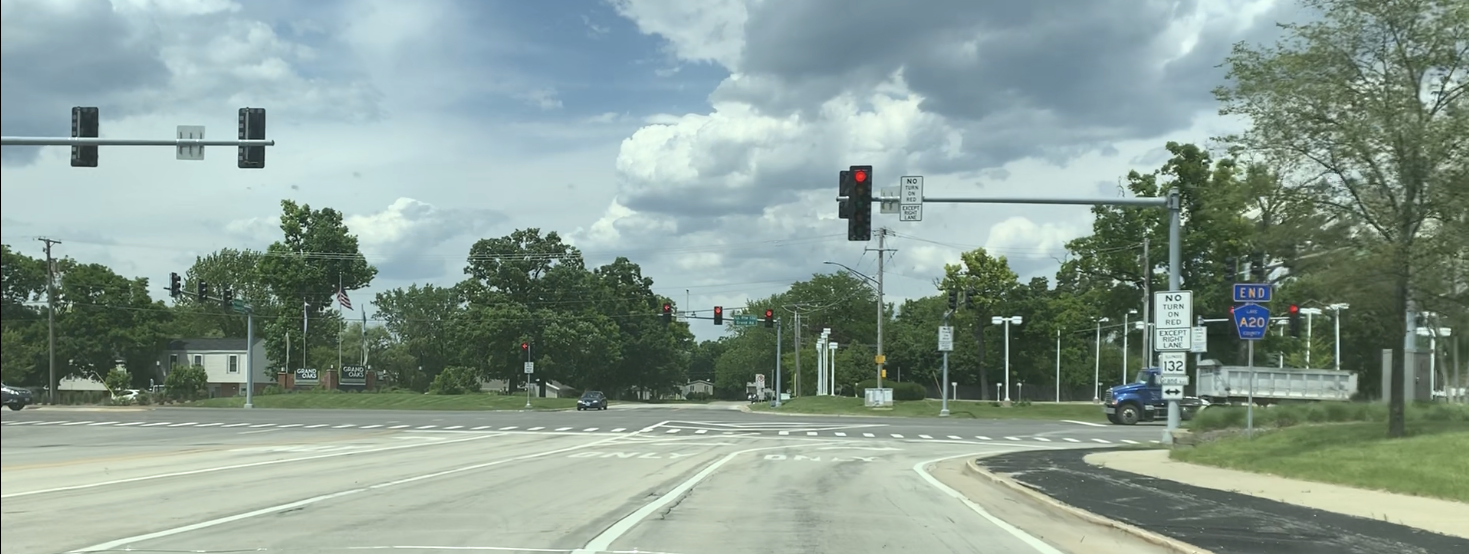
Illinois 132 as seen from its intersection with Rollins Road in Gurnee, IL

The entire route is in Lake County.

Location	mi	km	Destinations	Notes
Fox Lake Hills–Lake Villa village line	0.0	0.0	IL 59	Western terminus
Lake Villa	2.6	4.2	IL 83 (Milwaukee Avenue)	
Lindenhurst–Grandwood Park village line	7.0	11.3	US 45	
Gurnee	9.9	15.9	I-94 Toll (Tri-State Tollway) – Chicago, Wisconsin	Cloverleaf interchange; I-94 exit 8
Gurnee	11.2	18.0	IL 21 (Riverside Drive)	
Gurnee	12.7	20.4	US 41 (Skokie Highway)	
Waukegan	13.57	21.84	IL 131 (Green Bay Road)	Eastern terminus
1.000 mi = 1.609 km; 1.000 km = 0.621 mi
