= Illinois Route 68 =

State highway in northeastern Illinois, US

Illinois Route 68
- Dundee Road
- IL 68 highlighted in red

Route information
- Maintained by IDOT
- Length: 25.74 mi (41.42 km)
- Existed: 1942–present

Major junctions
- West end: IL 72 in East Dundee
- US 14 in Inverness; US 12 in Palatine; IL 53 in Arlington Heights; US 45 / IL 21 in Wheeling
- East end: I-94 / US 41 in Northbrook

Location
- Country: United States
- State: Illinois
- Counties: Kane, Cook

Highway system
- Illinois State Highway System; Interstate; US; State; Tollways; Scenic
← IL 67	→ I-70

Illinois Route 68 (IL 68) is a 25.74-mile-long (41.42 km) east–west state highway in the northeastern part of the U.S. state of Illinois. It travels east from IL 72 (Higgins Road) in the Dundee area to the concurrency of Interstate 94 (I-94)/U.S. Route 41 (US 41) (Edens Expressway) in Glencoe.

== Route description ==
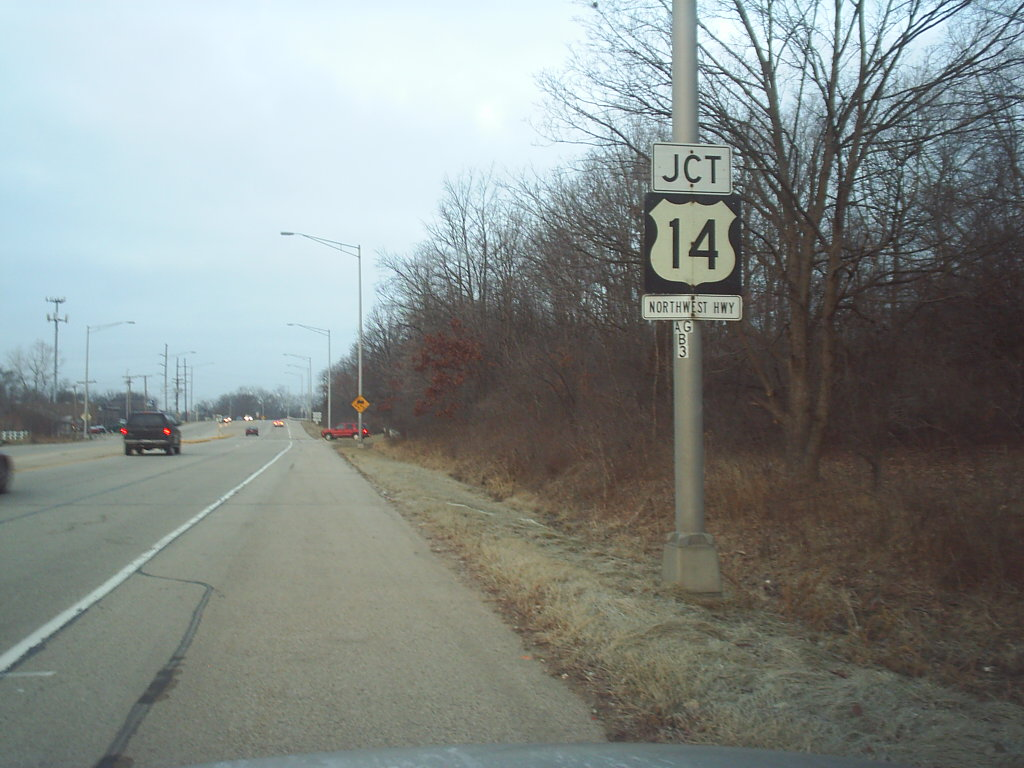
IL 68 approaching the interchange with US 14

IL 68 is called Dundee Road east of IL 25. It is known as Penny Avenue in East Dundee. East, in Glencoe, it continues as a local road to Green Bay Road.

The Dundee area refers to the cities of East Dundee and West Dundee. The towns are named after Dundee, Scotland, the hometown of a young settler who won the naming rights in a competition.

== History ==
State Bond Issue (SBI) Route 68 originally traveled from Lake Bluff to the Wisconsin state line on what is now IL 131 and US 41. IL 68 was changed to these routes from 1935 through 1937. In 1942, it was moved to the current IL 68 between IL 59 and then IL 42, which is still Sheridan Road to this day. In 1972, IL 68 was dropped east of US 41, which today is also I-94. The next year, it was extended west to East Dundee, replacing IL 63 and IL 22A.

== Major intersections ==
County	Location	mi	km	Destinations	Notes
Kane	East Dundee	0.00	0.00	IL 72 (Main Street)	Western terminus
Kane	East Dundee	0.80	1.29	IL 25 (Dundee Avenue)	
Cook	Barrington Hills	4.74	7.63	IL 62 west (Algonquin Road)	Western end of IL 62 concurrency
Cook	Barrington Hills	5.03	8.10	IL 59 south (Sutton Road) / IL 62 east (Algonquin Road)	Eastern end of IL 62 concurrency; southern end of IL 59 concurrency
Cook	Barrington Hills	6.42	10.33	IL 59 north (Hawthorne Road)	Northern end of IL 59 concurrency
Cook	Palatine	9.79	15.76	US 14 (Northwest Highway, Ronald Reagan Highway)	Diamond interchange
Cook	Palatine	13.51	21.74	US 12 / IL 53 north (Rand Road)	Western end of IL 53 concurrency
Cook	Palatine	14.24	22.92	IL 53 south To Lake Cook Road	Eastern end of IL 53 concurrency; partial cloverleaf interchange
Cook	Wheeling	17.88	28.78	IL 83 (Elmhurst Road)	
Cook	Wheeling	19.35	31.14	US 45 / IL 21 (Milwaukee Avenue)	
Cook	Northbrook	23.60	37.98	IL 43 (Waukegan Road) to I-94 Toll west	
Cook	Northbrook	25.74	41.42	I-94 east / US 41 south (Edens Expressway)	Eastern terminus; roadway continues as Dundee Road; no access from or to I-94 west/US 41 north; I-94 exit 30
1.000 mi = 1.609 km; 1.000 km = 0.621 mi: Concurrency terminus; Incomplete access
