= U.S. Route 14 in Illinois =

Segment of American highway

U.S. Route 14
- Ronald Reagan Highway
- US 14 highlighted in red

Route information
- Maintained by IDOT and CDOT
- Length: 69.55 mi (111.93 km)
- Existed: 1933–present

Major junctions
- West end: US 14 in Harvard
- IL 53 in Palatine; US 12 / US 45 in Des Plaines; I-294 Toll in Des Plaines I-94 in Chicago
- East end: US 41 in Chicago

Location
- Country: United States
- State: Illinois
- Counties: McHenry, Lake, Cook

Highway system
- United States Numbered Highway System; List; Special; Divided; Illinois State Highway System; Interstate; US; State; Tollways; Scenic
← IL 13	→ IL 14

U.S. Route 14 (US 14) in the state of Illinois is a major arterial that runs southeast from the Wisconsin state line north of Harvard to the north side of Chicago at US 41.

== Route description ==
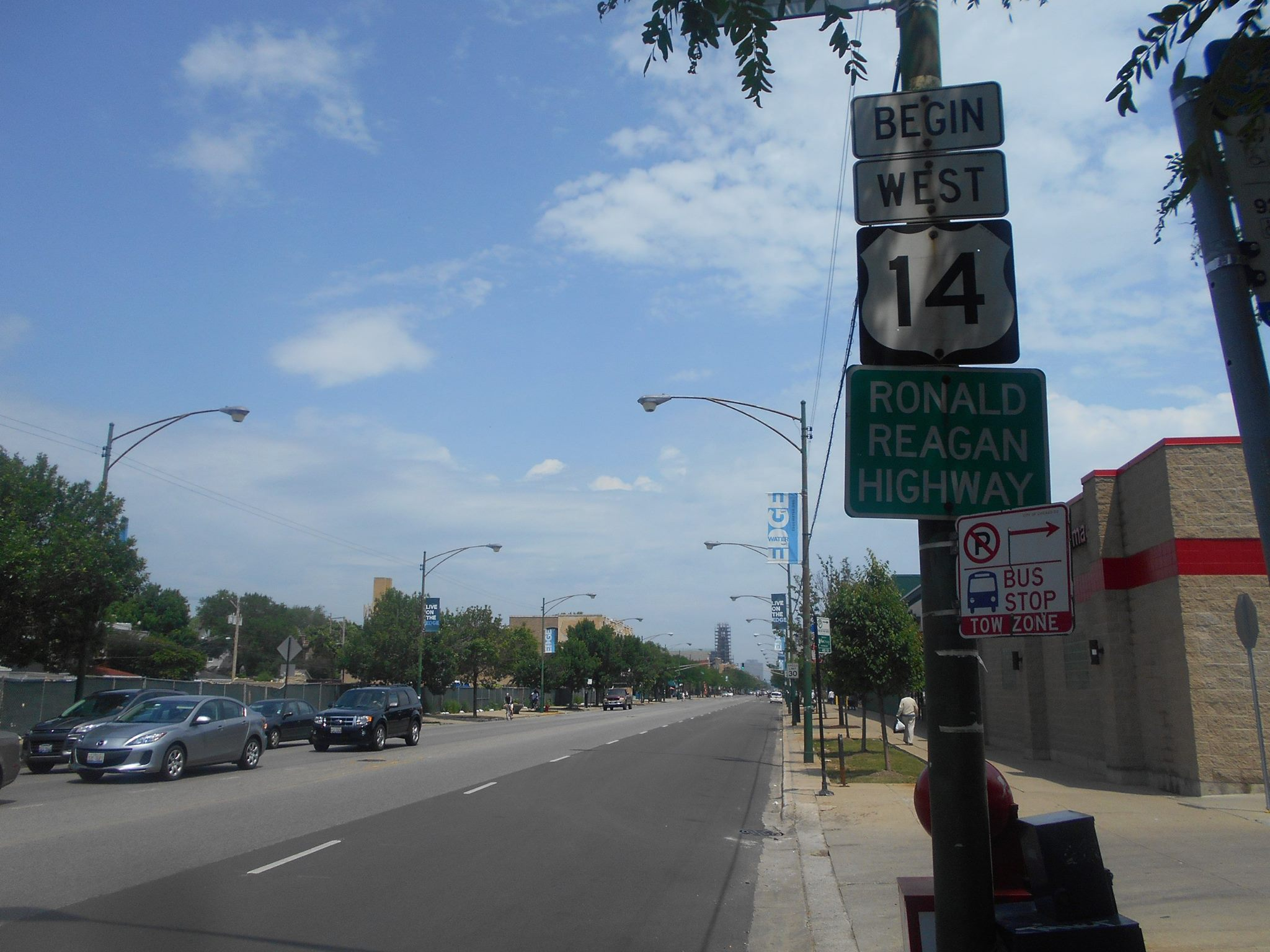
First signage on US 14 westbound after its terminus at US 41 in Chicago

US 14 begins in Chicago as Broadway on the city's north side. It runs north as Broadway and turns northwest onto Ridge Boulevard. One half block after crossing Clark Street, US 14 turns west onto Peterson Avenue. At Cicero Avenue, Peterson Avenue becomes Caldwell Avenue and travels in a northwest/northern direction entering Niles. US 14 joins Illinois Route 43 (IL 43; Waukegan Road) for a short time before turning west onto Dempster Street. US 14 travels west briefly touching Park Ridge and enters Des Plaines.

Where US 14 crosses Interstate 294 (I-294) is an unusual intersection where all four street names change. From the south is Northwest Highway coming out of Park Ridge and Chicago; from the north is Rand Road. US 14 continues straight west but no longer as Dempster Street, but now as Miner Street. Miner Street begins a northwesterly direction into downtown Des Plaines crossing two intersections of US 45 and US 12. The name Miner Street changes to Northwest Highway after going under a wooden railroad underpass on a large S-curve. US 14 continues for most of the rest of its length northwest to Wisconsin designated as Northwest Highway.

Though the name is not used among locals, the entire portion of US 14 in Illinois is given the honorary name Ronald Reagan Highway, which was named for President Ronald Reagan and is not to be confused with the Ronald Reagan Memorial Tollway. US 14 in Illinois is 69.55 miles (111.93 km) in length.

Large portions of US 14 run alongside the Union Pacific Northwest Line.

== History ==
Before the late 1930s, US 14 followed present-day IL 31 south of Crystal Lake, IL 72 east of West Dundee, Nagle Avenue in the Big Oaks neighborhood, and Addison Street in Dunning before terminating at Lake Shore Drive (US 41) in Lake View. In the late 1930s, the designation was rerouted to follow most of its current designation which directly connected to Park Ridge and Niles via Busse Highway and Center Street (now Touhy Avenue) before reaching Caldwell Avenue.

Between 1952 and 1978, US 14 continued toward Foster Avenue to Lake Shore Drive, where it then turned south. It left Lake Shore Drive for Michigan Avenue and then intersected at Jackson Boulevard (part of US 66 before 1974) where it terminated. Since 1978, US 14 now ends at Foster Avenue (US 41) in Uptown.

== Major intersections ==
County	Location	mi	km	Destinations	Notes
McHenry	Chemung Township	0.00	0.00	US 14 west – Walworth	Wisconsin state line
McHenry	Harvard	2.6	4.2	CR A15 east (Oak Grove Road)	Western terminus of CR A15
McHenry	Harvard	5.2	8.4	IL 173 east (Diggins Street)	Northern end of IL 173 concurrency
McHenry	Harvard	5.7	9.2	IL 173 west (Brink Street)	Southern end of IL 173 concurrency
McHenry	Harvard	6.2	10.0	CR A22 (McGuire Road, Airport Road)	
McHenry	Harvard	6.9	11.1	IL 23 south – Marengo	Northern terminus of IL 23
McHenry	Woodstock	11.5	18.5	CR A28 east (Deep Cut Road)	Western terminus of CR A28
McHenry	Woodstock	12.4	20.0	CR A29 west (Dunham Road)	Eastern terminus of CR A29
McHenry	Woodstock	14.9	24.0	IL 120 east (Washington Street)	Western terminus of IL 120
McHenry	Woodstock	19.6	31.5	IL 47 (Eastwood Drive)	
McHenry	Crystal Lake	25.4	40.9	IL 176 (Terra Cotta Avenue)	
McHenry	Crystal Lake	29.3	47.2	IL 31 – Algonquin, Elgin, McHenry	Interchange
McHenry	Fox River Grove	34.1	54.9	IL 22 east	Western terminus of IL 22
Lake	Barrington	38.5	62.0	IL 59 (Hough Street, Barrington Road) – Hoffman Estates, Wauconda	
Cook	Palatine Township	41.7	67.1	IL 68 (Dundee Road) – Dundee, Wheeling	Interchange
Cook	Palatine	46.6	75.0	IL 53	Interchange
Cook	Mt. Prospect	51.6	83.0	IL 83 (South Main Street)	
Cook	Des Plaines	52.9	85.1	IL 58 (Golf Road, Wolf Road)	Access via State Street
Cook	Des Plaines	54.5	87.7	US 12 / US 45 (Mannheim Road, Lee Street, Graceland Avenue)	
Cook	Des Plaines	55.6	89.5	I-294 Toll south (Tri-State Tollway) – Indiana	No access to I-294 north or from I-294 south; I-294 exit 44
Cook	Niles	57.7	92.9	IL 21 (Milwaukee Avenue)	Interchange
Cook	Morton Grove	59.1	95.1	IL 43 north (Waukegan Road) / IL 58 (Dempster Street)	Northern end of IL 43 concurrency
Cook	Morton Grove	59.5	95.8	IL 43 south (Waukegan Road)	Southern end of IL 43 concurrency
Cook	Chicago	63.8	102.7	I-94 (Edens Expressway) – Downtown Chicago, Milwaukee	No eastbound exit to I-94 west; no westbound entrance from I-94 east; I-94 exits 41A-B
Cook	Chicago	63.9	102.8	IL 50 (Cicero Avenue)	
Cook	Chicago	66.0	106.2	US 41 (Lincoln Avenue)	
Cook	Chicago	68.5	110.2	Hollywood Avenue to Lake Shore Drive	
Cook	Chicago	69.2	111.4	US 41 (Foster Avenue)	Eastern terminus of US 14
1.000 mi = 1.609 km; 1.000 km = 0.621 mi: Concurrency terminus; Incomplete access

U.S. Route 14
Previous state: Wisconsin	Illinois	Next state: Terminus
