= Illinois Route 50 =

State highway in northeastern Illinois, US

Illinois Route 50
- IL 50 highlighted in red

Route information
- Maintained by IDOT and CDOT
- Length: 66.49 mi (107.01 km)
- Existed: 1924–present

Major junctions
- South end: US 45 / US 52 in Kankakee
- I-57 in Bradley; US 30 in Matteson; US 6 in Oak Forest I-294 Toll in Alsip; US 12 / US 20 in Oak Lawn; I-55 in Chicago I-290 / IL 110 (CKC) in Chicago; I-94 in Chicago; US 14 in Chicago
- North end: US 41 in Skokie

Location
- Country: United States
- State: Illinois
- Counties: Kankakee, Will, Cook

Highway system
- Illinois State Highway System; Interstate; US; State; Tollways; Scenic
← US 50	→ US 51

Illinois Route 50 (IL 50) is a 66.49-mile-long (107.01 km) north–south state highway in northeastern Illinois. It runs from the junction with U.S. Route 45 (US 45) and U.S. Route 52 (US 52) in West Kankakee north to US 41 in Skokie. In Chicago and the suburbs, it is known as Cicero Avenue. Before this, Cicero Avenue was previously known as 48th Avenue, owing to its City of Chicago address of 4800 West.

== Route description ==
IL 50 begins in Kankakee at an intersection with Southeast Avenue (US 45/US 52) and heads north as Schuyler Avenue. The four-lane road crosses the Kankakee River and then turns east onto East River Street before turning north onto a one-way pair of Harrison Avenue northbound and Indiana Avenue southbound. While on this one-way pair, IL 50 crosses two railroads, then turns east onto Fair Street and crosses a third. After crossing the railroads, the roadway curves in a northerly direction and becomes Hobbie Avenue before it enters Bradley.

In Bradley, the road is known as Kinzie Avenue, and it continues due north, meeting a diamond interchange with Interstate 57 (I-57), then leaving the city. North of the city, IL 50 begins to parallel a railroad. It bends to the northeast, crosses the southern branch of Rock Creek, and passes through Manteno. Northeast of Manteno, the highway leaves Kankakee County and crosses into Will County. Still paralleling the railroad and I-57, IL 50 passes through Peotone and heads toward Monee. In Monee, the route dips to the north and crosses the railroad, then crosses into University Park. Here the route is known as Governors Highway. It curves north before leaving the city and Will County, crossing into urban Cook County.

Upon crossing into Cook County, IL 50 enters Richton Park. From here northward the road is known as Cicero Avenue. It passes straight through Richton Park and into Matteson. In Matteson, IL 50 meets Lincoln Highway (US 30). The route then continues due north through the remainder of Matteson, through the Southern Green Belt Forest Preserve, and into Country Club Hills. Continuing north through Country Club Hills, IL 50 crosses under I-80, then under I-57, without access to either highway. Just north of I-57, IL 50 curves slightly to the northwest, leaves Country Club Hills and enters Oak Forest. The route continues northward in Oak Forest, intersecting 159th Street (US 6). North of the US 6 intersection, the highway crosses into Midlothian, where it intersects IL 83 south at 149th Street.

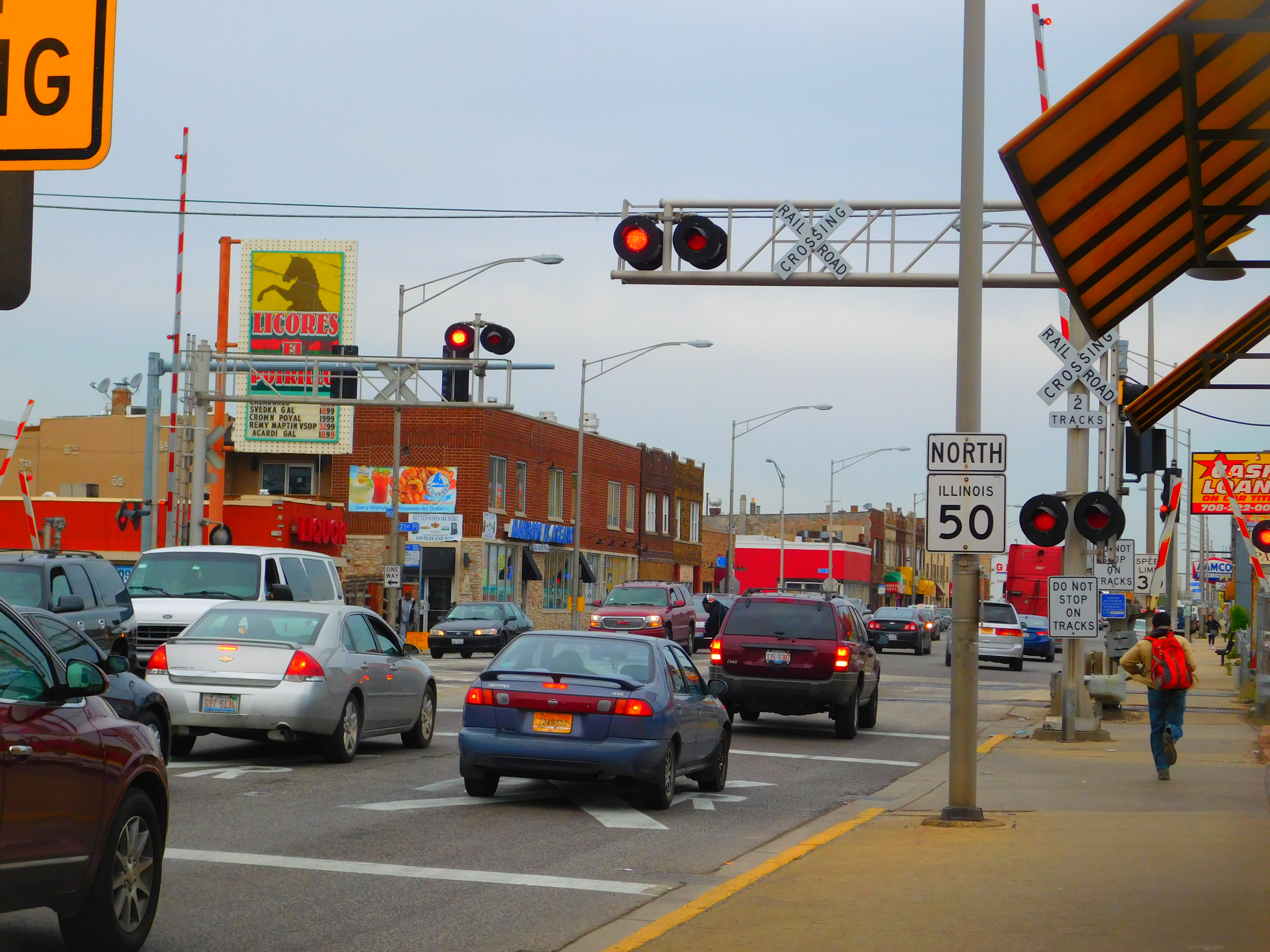
IL 50 northbound at the Pink Line, with a train approaching

IL 50 and IL 83 head north and enter Crestwood. In the northern part of this city, IL 83 splits off to the northwest at an intersection with Cal Sag Road, while IL 50 continues heading north and crosses the Little Calumet River into Alsip. Here, the highway shares an interchange with I-294 (Tri-State Tollway), then continues due north into Oak Lawn. In Oak Lawn, IL 50 meets US 12 and US 20 at 95th Street, then continues north and leaves the city. Around 79th street, It begins to parallel Illinois Route 171 and Illinois Route 43 to the west. It parallels Illinois 171 until its terminus at Illinois Route 72 and Illinois Route 43 for the duration of the route. Continuing north, the highway enters Chicago entirely and serves Chicago Midway International Airport, then meets I-55 (Stevenson Expressway) at a diamond interchange.

North of the interchange with I-55, IL 50 crosses the Chicago Ship and Sanitary Canal, leaving Chicago and entering Cicero. The route re-enters Chicago a short distance later, meeting I-290 (Dwight D. Eisenhower Expressway) just north of the boundary. Heading north through the western portion of the city, the highway intersects IL 64 and IL 19 before crossing under I-90 (Kennedy Expressway) without access. Continuing north, IL 50 meets I-94 (Edens Expressway) at an interchange in which IL 50 has no access to I-94, and only traffic travelling eastbound on I-94 can access IL 50 southbound. The route then crosses the north branch of the Chicago River and intersects US 14 at Peterson Avenue. North of this intersection, the highway leaves Chicago and passes through Lincolnwood. It then continues north to its northern terminus at Lincoln Avenue (US 41) in Skokie.

== Transportation ==
In Chicago and its near suburbs, Cicero Avenue is primarily served by three bus routes. 54 Cicero runs from 24th Place near Cicero station to Montrose Avenue near Mayfair station. 54A North Cicero/Skokie Blvd runs from Irving Park station to Skokie Courthouse. 54B South Cicero runs from 54th/Cermak station to Ford City Mall.

== Major intersections ==
County	Location	mi	km	Destinations	Notes
Kankakee	Kankakee	0.0	0.0	US 45 / US 52 (Southeast Avenue / Schuyler Avenue)	Southern terminus
Kankakee	Kankakee	1.4	2.3	IL 17 (Court Street)	
Kankakee	Bourbonnais	5.1	8.2	I-57 – Champaign, Chicago	I-57 exit 315
Will	No major junctions				
Cook	Matteson	29.8	48.0	US 30 / Lincoln Highway	
Cook	Oak Forest	35.59	57.28	167th Street to I-57	
Cook	Oak Forest	36.6	58.9	US 6 (159th Street)	
Cook	Midlothian	38.1	61.3	IL 83 south (147th Street)	South end of IL 83 concurrency
Cook	Alsip	40.6	65.3	IL 83 north (127th Street)	North end of IL 83 concurrency
Cook	Alsip	40.8	65.7	I-294 Toll (Tri-State Tollway) – West Suburbs, Indiana	I-294 exit 12; access to southbound I-294 via 127th street
Cook	Oak Lawn	44.7	71.9	US 12 / US 20 (95th Street)	
Cook	Chicago	49.2	79.2	Chicago Midway International Airport	Interchange
Cook	Chicago	51.4	82.7	I-55 (Stevenson Expressway) – Chicago, St. Louis	I-55 exit 286
Cook	Cicero	53.2	85.6	Historic US 66 (Ogden Avenue) to 26th Street	Interchange
Cook	Chicago	55.2	88.8	I-290 west / IL 110 (CKC) west (Eisenhower Expressway)	I-290 exit 24B; no direct access from or to I-290 east/IL 110 east
Cook	Chicago	57.8	93.0	IL 64 (North Avenue)	
Cook	Chicago	60.8	97.8	IL 19 (Irving Park Road) / Milwaukee Avenue	The Six Corners
Cook	Chicago	62.7	100.9	I-94 east (Edens Expressway)	I-94 exit 41C; southbound entrance only
Cook	Chicago	63.3	101.9	US 14 (Caldwell Avenue / Peterson Avenue) to I-94	
Cook	Skokie	66.49	107.01	US 41 (Skokie Boulevard / Lincoln Avenue)	Northern terminus
1.000 mi = 1.609 km; 1.000 km = 0.621 mi: Concurrency terminus; Incomplete access
