= Illinois Route 120 =

State highway in northeastern Illinois, US

Illinois Route 120
- Belvidere Road
- IL 120 highlighted in red

Route information
- Maintained by IDOT
- Length: 34.62 mi (55.72 km)
- Existed: 1941–present

Major junctions
- West end: US 14 in Woodstock
- US 12 / IL 59 in Volo; US 45 in Grayslake I-94 Toll in Gurnee; US 41 in Park City
- East end: IL 131 in Waukegan

Location
- Country: United States
- State: Illinois
- Counties: McHenry, Lake

Highway system
- Illinois State Highway System; Interstate; US; State; Tollways; Scenic
← IL 119	→ IL 121
← US 20	IL 20	→ IL 21

Illinois Route 120 (IL 120) is a major east–west state highway in northeastern Illinois. It runs from U.S. Route 14 near Woodstock to Illinois Route 131 in Waukegan. It travels a distance of 34.62 miles (55.72 km) and is one of the few roads that provides direct access from McHenry County to Interstate 94 (Tri-State Tollway) in Lake County. Throughout its length, it shifts between two and four lanes as it passes through a setting that consists of open rural areas, as well as larger developments and heavy congestion.

Although small capacity expansions have been made over time, a lengthy two lane section of road in the Grayslake vicinity has yet to see any major expansion. This key segment has been the subject of much debate regarding the greater traffic flow across north-central Lake County. In October 2009, a special council approved a unified vision for a plan for most of the Lake County portion of Illinois 120, which includes a long discussed bypass around downtown Grayslake.

== Route description ==
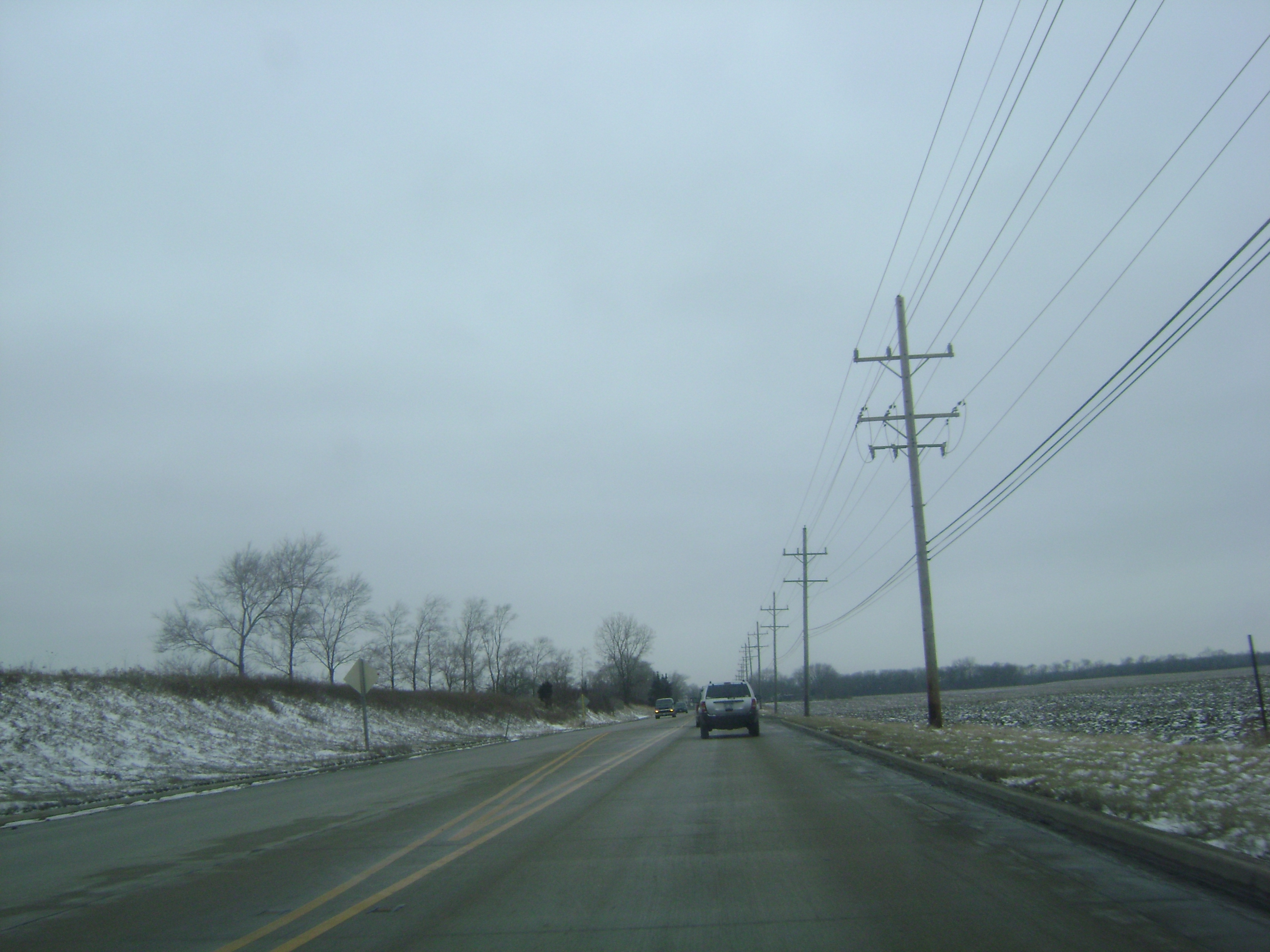
Westbound IL 120 after narrowing down to two lanes, just west of the McHenry area.

=== McHenry County ===
Beginning at its western terminus at a rural unsignalized intersection with U.S. Route 14 (Northwest Highway), IL 120 starts out as a two lane road just west of the city of Woodstock. This section is known as Washington Street as it heads in a southeast direction and enters the outer residential neighborhoods of Woodstock. In this area, the road curves due east, crosses the Metra Union Pacific Northwest Line tracks near the station, then briefly heads north before turning once more to the northwest. Immediately after doing so, it passes a signalized intersection with IL 47 (Seminary Avenue/Eastwood Drive) before traveling north of the McHenry County Fairgrounds and then heading out of the Woodstock area and back into a prairie setting. The road then curves back to the north and then takes a right turn at an unsignalized intersection where it continues generally east for the remainder of its length.

Before reaching the McHenry area a little more than four miles east, the road passes through two signalized intersections, some light forests, and some sparse residential developments. Now entering the busier city of McHenry, it takes on the name Elm Street and widens to four lanes west of Ringwood Road. Light commercial buildings with neighborhoods behind them line the roadway until the crossing of the McHenry Branch of the Union Pacific/Northwest Line near the McHenry Metra station. At the next intersection, IL 120 meets with IL 31 (Front Street/Richmond Road) where they briefly run concurrently for less than a half mile. It next travels over the Fox River, passes by another section of commercial business, and then returns to a quieter setting that features a mix of open areas, neighborhoods, small business, and Lily Lake.

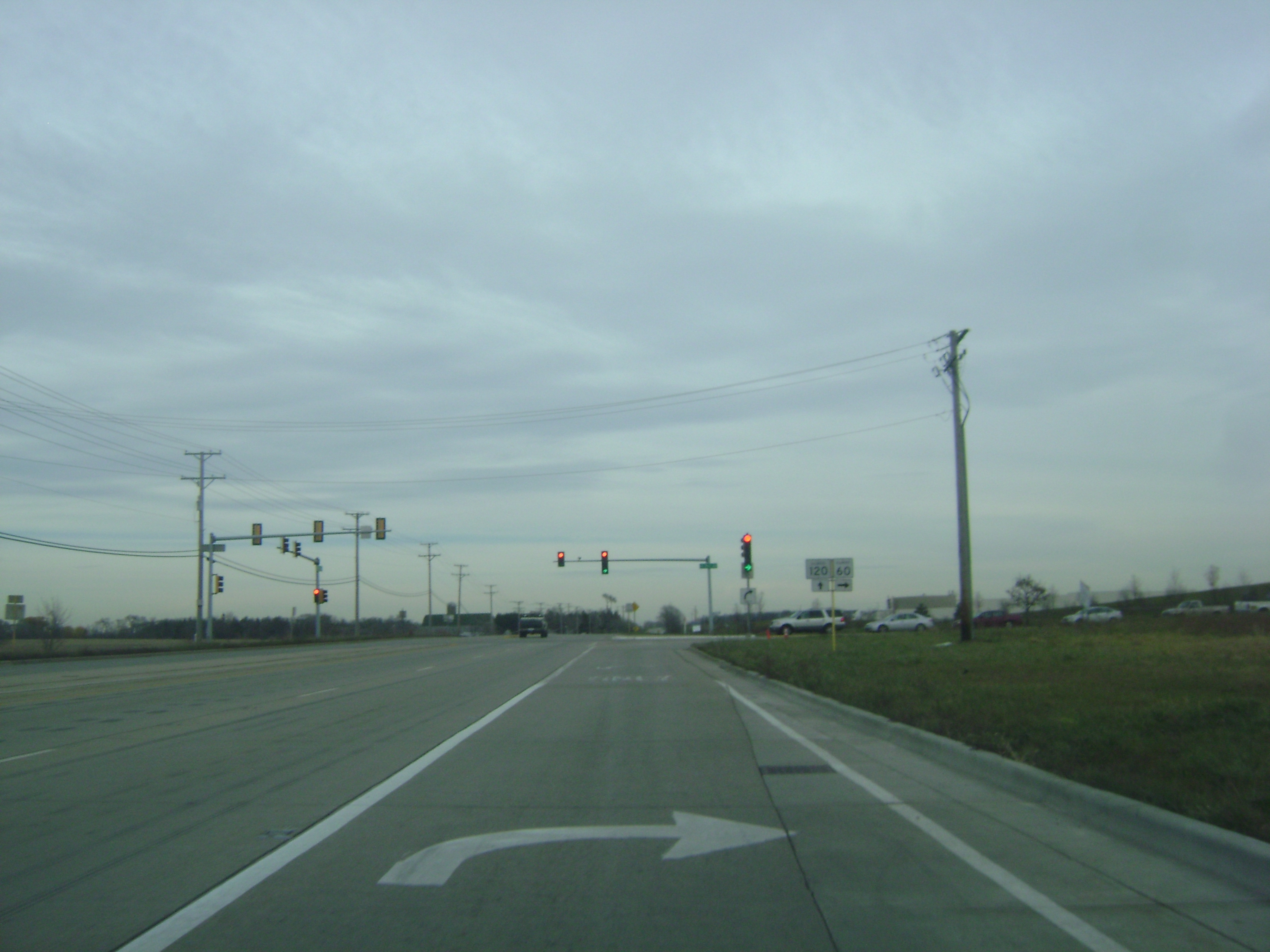
The western terminus of IL 60 in Volo, shortly before reverting to two lanes.

=== Lake County ===
Continuing its somewhat rural journey to the east, Illinois 120 becomes known as Belvidere Road as it enters Lake County and the town of Lakemoor which is soon followed by the busy intersection of U.S. Route 12/Illinois Route 59 (Rand Road). The road then heads into the town of Volo which features land developed with businesses and homes on the south and undeveloped land on the north. This is also where it passes the intersection of the western terminus of IL 60 and then narrows down to two lanes. The road then runs past the Baxter Healthcare facility and proceeds into the Round Lake area where it goes by the Nippersink Forest Preserve on the north and then between two residential developments. For just a slight instance, it travels through Round Lake Park before entering the town of Hainesville where it passes the Metra Milwaukee District North Line tracks, the eastern terminus of IL 134, and a few businesses before going into the more populated city of Grayslake. Neighborhoods and occasional small businesses lie north and south of the road until it crosses Canadian National Railway (CN) tracks (used by the Metra North Central Service) immediately before an intersection with IL 83 (Barron Boulevard). After passing a shopping plaza on the south, the next stretch of roadway contains a mix of other businesses and residential developments, as well as a branch of the Lake Forest Hospital, while also widening to four lanes on its approach to a major junction with U.S. Route 45. Past the intersection, the road passes a commercial plaza and again narrows back to two lanes before going by more neighborhoods on the north, and some open areas that contain the Almond Marsh Forest Preserve on the south.

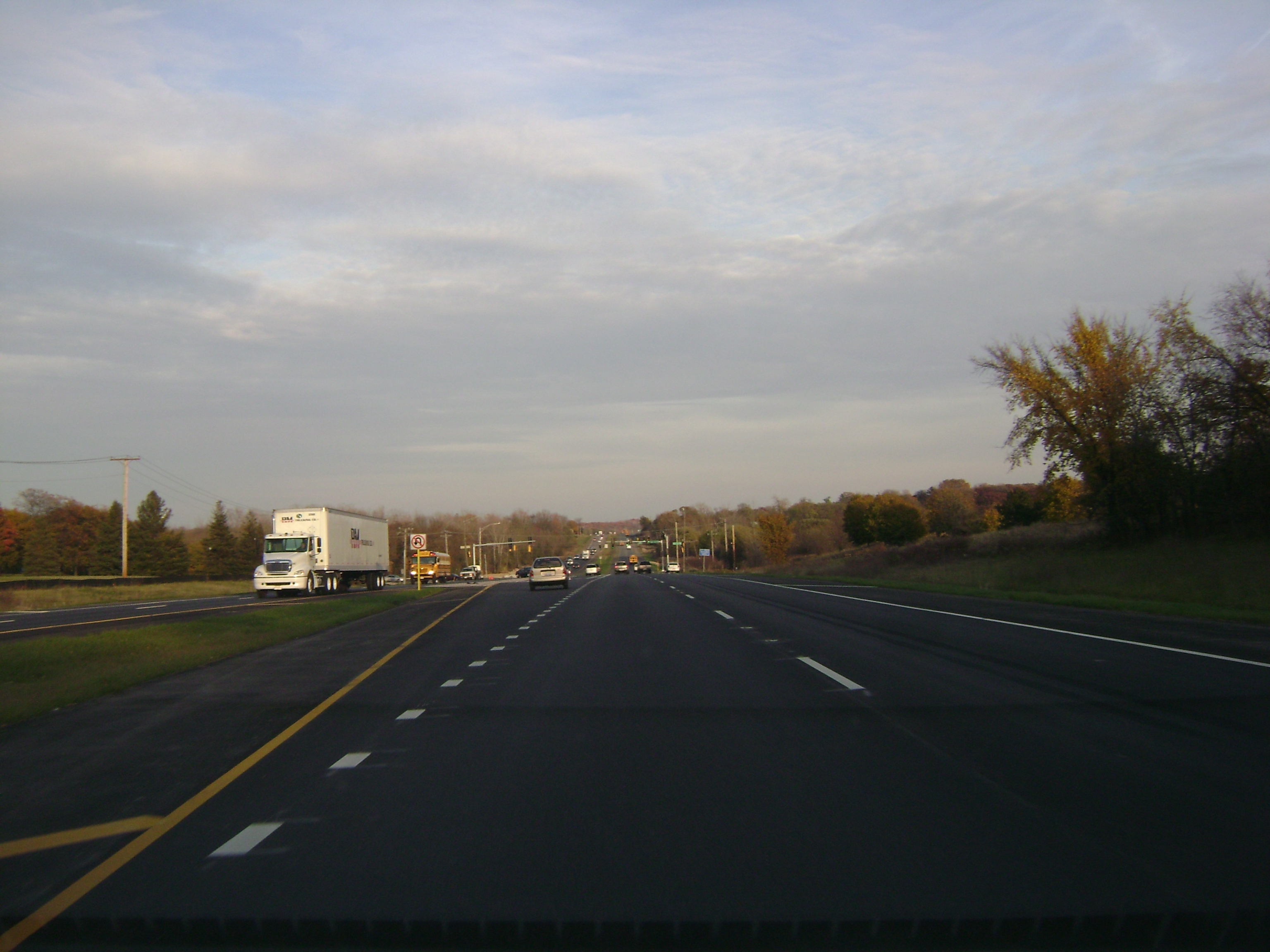
Eastbound IL 120 approaching Hunt Club Road on divided highway section.

At this point it widens to become a four-lane divided highway west of Almond Road and it enters the southern part of Gurnee where travels near the Merit Club golf course which lies to the south of a "T" intersection with Hunt Club Road. The eastbound approach to this intersection features the only dual-left turn lanes on the entire length of Illinois 120. The remaining section of highway, although only briefly limited-access, does have limited signalized intersections which keeps traffic flowing at a more constant rate. It first passes under a grade separation at Illinois Route 21 (Milwaukee Avenue) and goes over the Des Plaines River before forming an interchange with Interstate 94 (Tri-State Tollway). Only southbound access is permitted to I-94; northbound access is available via IL 21. It next enters part of the Waukegan area and shortly encounters an at-grade intersection with O'Plaine Road and then continues with more grade separation at the Canadian Pacific Railway (CP) tracks and Greenleaf Avenue. Interchanges with IL 43 (Waukegan Road) and U.S. Route 41 (Skokie Highway) closely follow one another with a brief transition into Park City located between these two junctions. It can be confusing in this area as there is no direct access to northbound US-41 or southbound IL-43, which terminates immediately north at US-41. Illinois 120 loses its divided highway status after traveling over the Union Pacific (UP) tracks and passing by its last stretch of businesses as it reenters Waukegan. It soon reaches the commercially developed, signalized intersection of Illinois Route 131 (Green Bay Road) where it terminates as a state route; Belvidere Road continues east as a local road.

== History ==
State Bond Issue (SBI) Route 120 originally ran from Havana to Mason City in west-central Illinois. In 1939 this became IL 119, and in 1951, U.S. Route 136. In the meantime, in 1941 Illinois 120 replaced Illinois Route 20 to avoid confusion with nearby U.S. Route 20. In 1972, the designation was removed east of IL 131. During the early 1990s, plans came about to widen 5.7 miles of roadway in McHenry and Lake counties. The project extended from River Road in McHenry to east of Illinois 60. These plans also included the construction of a short southern bypass around the town of Volo. By 1994, the work had concluded which resulted in four concrete travel lanes. In 2000, a $4.6 million construction project was completed at the intersection of US-45. The changes that took place to Illinois 120 were: expanding to two lanes in each direction and adding a right turn lane to the eastbound approach. The most recent major construction that has taken place was between August 2007 and July 2008 at the interchange with I-94. The work consisted of demolishing the two bridge structures that travel over the tollway and replacing them with new ones.

== Future ==
In recent years there has been much discussion on how to improve the east–west traffic flow throughout north-central Lake County. IL 120 enters Lake County from the west as a four-lane highway and then becomes a two-lane highway less than three miles east, just past IL 60 and later becomes a four lane divided highway west of Hunt Club Road. Since there is heavy traffic from nearby Interstate 94 to the east as well as traffic traveling to and from McHenry County in the west, some believe this gap should become four lanes. As part of this expansion plan, a 7-mile southern bypass in Grayslake would be constructed. This has since become known as the "120 bypass".

This project is closely related to another long delayed Lake county transportation project; the IL 53 extension. The currently stalled project has been planned to extend the limited-access expressway, which carries IL 53 and terminates at Lake-Cook Road, north to connect to the 120 bypass, and then branch off toward U.S. Route 12 to the west and Interstate 94 to the east. If the project were ever built, the east–west 120 bypass would likely be built as a limited-access expressway to connect with the proposed north–south Illinois 53 extension which is also limited-access. The entire scope of this project; starting on Illinois 120 at Interstate 94, continuing west on the 120 bypass, and connecting with the Illinois 53 extension would provide a direct route for commuters in northern Lake County to gain access to the western and southwestern Chicago suburbs. Since there have been many delays over the decades on how to proceed with this extension, the 120 bypass project moved forward on its own as an independent project.

In 2006, a feasibility study got underway by a special corridor planning council which was composed of groups from nearby communities and local government officials and took public input. Initially, the main focus for the public was to provide feedback for the road character or type of road. The alternatives considered were: a four lane roundabout boulevard, four lane signalized boulevard, six lane signalized arterial, and six lane expressway. In December 2008, it was revealed that the four lane boulevard option was selected in an 11–2 vote over an expressway, however it still remained open whether or not roundabouts would be used in place of traffic signals at intersections. The cost of the project was estimated at $521 million. In May 2009, the preferred roadway alignment was selected.

On October 14, 2009, the Route 120 Corridor Planning Council Governance Board came to a consensus and approved a vision for the project which recommends that the bypass be built as a four lane arterial highway with limited-access. The next step is for the Illinois Department of Transportation to begin a Phase I Preliminary Engineering Study.

In 2012, the Blue Ribbon Advisory Council revived the 120 expressway alternative as a tollway, rather than a roundabout or signalized boulevard, and proposed the Route 53/120 expressway plan to IDOT as a four-lane, completely below grade tollway with a speed limit of 45 mph. The proposed roadway would include such features as a multi-use path, bioswale grassy median, landscaped raised berms, in-pavement lighting, all electronic tolling, and innovative interchange designs.

In 2016, Lake County Board Chairman Aaron Lawlor withdrew his support for the project, issuing a statement indicating his belief that "financial and political realities have become insurmountable" and would prevent the extension from happening in the environmental way envisioned in the 2012 report. Despite the withdrawn support, the Illinois State Toll Highway Authority made no changes to the plan to conduct an environmental impact study, with Chairman Bob Schillerstrom stating "many of the questions that Chairman Lawlor raised would be answered" by such a study.

On May 25, 2017, the Illinois Tollway board unanimously approved a $25 million expenditure for an environmental impact study of the proposed northward extension of Illinois Route 53 into Lake County. Opponents continued to criticize the project as expensive and harmful to the environment, while supporters believe it will provide congestion relief and a boon to the economies of Lake and McHenry counties. The U.S. Public Interest Research Group, a consumer advocacy organization, included the Route 53 extension in a list of "nine wasteful highway boondoggles," pegging the cost at $2.3 billion and saying it "would jeopardize the environment and lacks a viable funding plan."

== Major intersections ==
County	Location	mi	km	Destinations	Notes
McHenry	Woodstock	0.0	0.0	US 14 (Northwest Highway)	Western terminus
McHenry	Woodstock	3.0	4.8	IL 47 (Seminary Avenue)	
McHenry	McHenry	13.3	21.4	IL 31 south (Front Street)	West end of IL 31 overlap
McHenry	McHenry	13.6	21.9	IL 31 north (Richmond Road)	East end of IL 31 overlap
Lake	Lakemoor–Volo village line	19.3	31.1	US 12 / IL 59	
Lake	Volo	19.9	32.0	IL 60	Western terminus of IL 60
Lake	Hainesville	24.4	39.3	IL 134 (Main Street)	Eastern terminus of IL 134
Lake	Grayslake	26.4	42.5	IL 83 (Barron Boulevard)	
Lake	Grayslake	27.8	44.7	US 45	
Lake	Gurnee	30.9	49.7	IL 21 (Milwaukee Avenue)	Grade separated; partial cloverleaf interchange
Lake	Gurnee	32.0	51.5	I-94 Toll east (Tri-State Tollway) – Chicago	No access to I-94 west or from I-94 east; I-94 exit 11
Lake	Waukegan	33.1	53.3	Fountain Square Place / Greenleaf Street to IL 43 south	Grade separated; Diamond interchange
Lake	Park City	33.7	54.2	US 41 (Skokie Highway) – Chicago, Milwaukee	Grade separated
Lake	Waukegan	34.6	55.7	IL 131 (Green Bay Road)	Eastern terminus
1.000 mi = 1.609 km; 1.000 km = 0.621 mi: Concurrency terminus; Incomplete access
