= U.S. Route 41 in Illinois =

U.S. Highway in Illinois

U.S. Route 41
- US 41 highlighted in red

Route information
- Maintained by IDOT and CDOT
- Length: 64.81 mi (104.30 km)
- Existed: November 11, 1926–present
- Tourist routes: Lake Michigan Circle Tour

Major junctions
- South end: US 12 / US 20 / US 41 at Chicago
- I-90 Toll / Chicago Skyway in Chicago; US 12 / US 20 in Chicago; I-55 in Chicago; US 14 in Chicago; I-94 in Northfield; I-94 Toll in Northbrook; I-41 / I-94 Toll near Zion
- North end: I-41 / I-94 / US 41 near Zion

Location
- Country: United States
- State: Illinois
- Counties: Cook, Lake

Highway system
- United States Numbered Highway System; List; Special; Divided; Illinois State Highway System; Interstate; US; State; Tollways; Scenic
← I-41	→ IL 41

U.S. Route 41 (US 41) in the U.S. state of Illinois runs north from the Indiana border beneath the Chicago Skyway on Indianapolis Boulevard to the Wisconsin border north of the northern terminus of the Tri-State Tollway with Interstate 94. It is the only north–south U.S. Route to travel through a significant portion of the city of Chicago, carrying Lake Shore Drive through the central portion of the city along the lakefront. US 41 in Illinois is 64.81 miles (104.30 km) in length.

== Route description ==
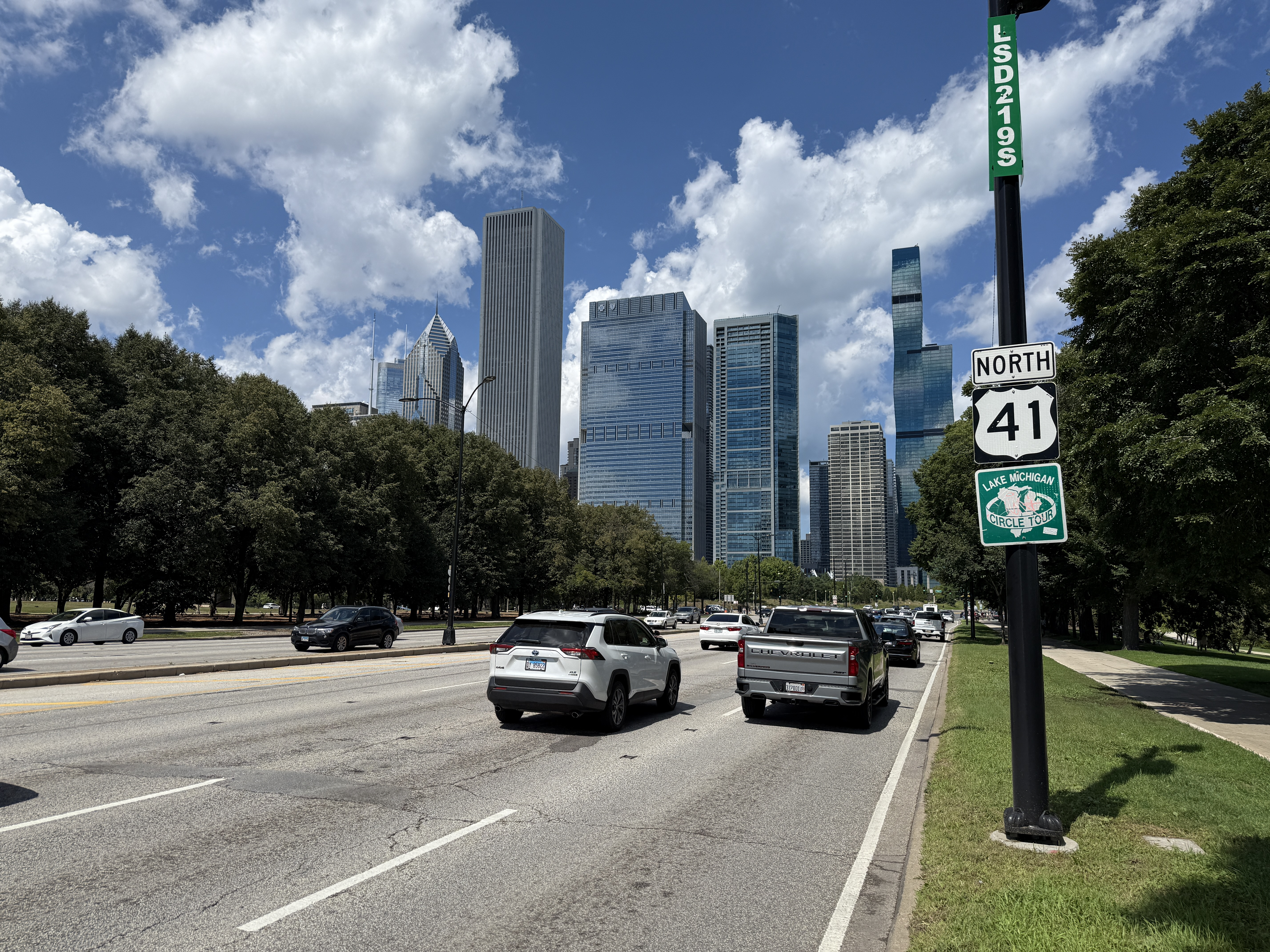
US 41 northbound on Lake Shore Drive in Chicago

US 41 enters Illinois running concurrently with US 12 and US 20 on the far southeast side of Chicago. They run together until the junction of 95th Street and Ewing Avenue. US 41 then continues down Ewing Avenue for one-half mile (800 m) before heading northwest–southeast along the extension of Lake Shore Drive. Lake Shore Drive continues until US 41 meets South Shore Drive and 79th Street. This is the western terminus of the Lake Shore Drive extension and US 41 continues through the South Shore neighborhood's section of South Shore Drive before reaching the southern terminus of Lake Shore Drive.

The Lake Shore Drive section of US 41 is a six- to eight-lane highway along the shores of Lake Michigan through Chicago's lakefront park system. It is a limited-access highway except for five signalized intersections near downtown Chicago.

Just short of the northern terminus of Lake Shore Drive, US 41 exits at Foster Avenue. It follows Foster Avenue west for over two miles (3.2 km) and then heads northwest on Lincoln Avenue into neighboring Lincolnwood. Between Lake Shore Drive and Lincolnwood, US 41 intersects US 14 twice; once at its terminus at Foster Avenue and Broadway, and once again at the intersection of Peterson Avenue and Lincoln Avenue.

US 41 is named Skokie Boulevard through Skokie, then its name changes to Skokie Road in Wilmette. Traveling north, it joins I-94 (Edens Expressway) westbound just north of the Old Orchard Shopping Center; they split a few miles north when US 41 becomes the Skokie Highway. The highway serves as a major north–south arterial expressway for much of its routing through Chicago's northern suburbs, as well as an oft-used alternate for truckers avoiding the cost of tolls on the Tri-State Tollway. Before reaching the Wisconsin border, US 41 rejoins I-94 at the northern terminus of the Tri-State Tollway; these two roads continue, toll-free, north one mile (1.6 km) to the Wisconsin border.

== History ==
Initially, US 41 followed what used to be Illinois Route 42. In 1931, it was rerouted away from Zion and Winthrop Harbor while IL 42 north of Chicago remained untouched. In 1935, an entire section of US 41 between Chicago and Waukegan was realigned to a new alignment. The new alignment closely matched the current routing of US 41. By 1939, Skokie Highway (part of US 41) was fully completed. With the completion of the Edens Expressway in 1951, US 41 was moved onto the expressway north of Touhy Avenue. Eventually, in 1959, Interstate 94 appeared on the Edens Expressway as well as the Edens Spur and part of the Tri-State Tollway. In 1966, US 41 was rerouted back onto Skokie Boulevard. In 1987, the S-curve was straightened out. By 1997, the northbound lanes were moved west to the southbound lanes; eliminating the split at Museum Campus. Around that same year, the overpass north of I-55 became fully pedestrianized in favor of expanding McCormick Place.

A $64 million Lake Shore Drive extension project, spanning from 79th Street to 92nd Street/Ewing Avenue/Harbor Avenue junctions, began in April 2012. Unlike the northern portion of LSD, the extension would function more like an arterial road instead of a limited-access road. Previously, a portion of U.S. Route 41 used to travel north through Mackinaw Avenue, west through 87th Street, north through Burley Avenue, west through 85th Street, northwest through Baker Avenue, and north through South Shore Drive until it reached 79th Street. The extension eventually opened on October 27, 2013. As a result, US 41 moved eastward onto the new road.

== Major intersections ==
County	Location	mi	km	Exit	Destinations	Notes
Cook	Chicago	0.00	0.00		US 12 east / US 20 east / US 41 south / LMCT (Indianapolis Boulevard) – Hammond	Continuation into Indiana
Cook	Chicago	0.01	0.016		I-90 Toll west / Chicago Skyway west	Access to I-90 east is in Indiana; I-90 exit 107
Cook	Chicago	1.71	2.75		US 12 west / US 20 west (95th Street)	Northern end of US 12/US 20 overlap
Cook	Chicago	6.41	10.32		Jeffery Drive, Marquette Drive	Southern end of DuSable Lake Shore Drive
Cook	Chicago	7.7	12.4		57th Drive to I-90 Toll east / Chicago Skyway east	Southern end of freeway
Cook	Chicago	8.2	13.2	—	53rd Street	Southbound exit only
Cook	Chicago	8.6	13.8	—	Hyde Park Boulevard (5100 South)	Southbound exit only
Cook	Chicago	9.1	14.6	—	47th Street	
Cook	Chicago	10.3	16.6	—	Oakwood Boulevard (3940 South)	
Cook	Chicago	11.3	18.2	—	31st Street	
Cook	Chicago	12.0	19.3	—	I-55 south (Stevenson Expressway) to I-90 / I-94 – St. Louis	Northern terminus of I-55
Cook	Chicago	12.7	20.4	—	18th Drive – Museum Campus	Northern end of freeway
Cook	Chicago	12.9	20.8		Waldron Drive (1600 South)	At-grade intersection; northbound exit and entrance
Cook	Chicago	13.2	21.2		Columbus Drive (300 East) to I-290	Northbound exit and southbound entrance
Cook	Chicago	13.2	21.2		McFetridge Drive (1326 South)	Northbound exit and entrance
Cook	Chicago	13.4	21.6		Roosevelt Road (1200 South) to I-90 / I-94	
Cook	Chicago	13.8	22.2		Balbo Drive (700 South) to I-90 / I-94 / I-290	
Cook	Chicago	14.2	22.9		Jackson Drive (300 South) to I-90 / I-94 / I-290	
Cook	Chicago	14.6	23.5	—	Randolph Street (150 North)	
Cook	Chicago	14.7	23.7	—	Wacker Drive (300 North) to I-290	Northbound exit is via Randolph Street; southbound exit is via Grand Avenue
Cook	Chicago	15.2	24.5	—	Illinois Street (500 North), Grand Avenue (530 North)	
Cook	Chicago	15.3	24.6	—	Ontario Street (620 North)	Southbound exit only
Cook	Chicago	15.6	25.1		Chicago Avenue (800 North)	At-grade intersection; no southbound exit (Note: This intersection is closed to traffic entering & exiting the drive from either direction from 6:45am–9:30am Monday through Friday (traffic light on the drive remains solid green and cones block the turning lanes and exit point; the Chestnut Street southbound exit is unaffected))
Cook	Chicago	15.7	25.3	—	Chestnut Street (860 North)	Southbound exit only
Cook	Chicago	16.2	26.1	—	Michigan Avenue/Oak Street (1000 North)	Southbound exit and northbound entrance
Cook	Chicago	16.9	27.2	—	IL 64 west (LaSalle Drive, North Avenue (1600 North))	Eastern terminus of IL 64
Cook	Chicago	17.8	28.6	—	Fullerton Parkway (2400 North)	
Cook	Chicago	19.0	30.6	—	Belmont Avenue (3200 North)	
Cook	Chicago	19.5	31.4	—	Recreation Drive (3400 North)	Northbound exit only
Cook	Chicago	20.0	32.2	—	IL 19 west (Irving Park Road (4000 North))	Eastern terminus of IL 19
Cook	Chicago	20.5	33.0	—	Montrose Avenue (4400 North)	
Cook	Chicago	20.8	33.5	—	Wilson Avenue (4600 North)	
Cook	Chicago	21.0	33.8	—	Lawrence Avenue (4800 North)	
Cook	Chicago	21.51	34.62	—	DuSable Lake Shore Drive north	Interchange; northern end of Lake Shore Drive overlap; northbound exit and southbound entrance
Cook	Chicago	22.01	35.42		US 14 west (Broadway Street)	Eastern terminus of US 14
Cook	Chicago	25.01	40.25		US 14 (Peterson Avenue)	
Cook	Lincolnwood	27.3	43.9		Touhy Avenue to I-94	
Cook	Skokie	27.9	44.9		IL 50 south (Cicero Avenue / Skokie Boulevard)	Northern terminus of IL 50
Cook	Skokie	29.5	47.5		IL 58 west (Dempster Street)	Eastern terminus of IL 58
Cook	Wilmette	32.9	52.9		I-94 east (Edens Expressway)	Southern end of I-94 overlap; southbound exit and northbound entrance; I-94 exit 34A; exit numbers follow I-94
Cook	Northfield	34.0	54.7	33	Willow Road	Northbound exit and southbound entrance; signed as exits 33A (west) and 33B (east)
Cook	Northfield	35.1	56.5	31	Tower Road	Southbound exit and northbound entrance
Cook	Northbrook	36.7	59.1	30	IL 68 west (Dundee Road)	Northbound exit and southbound entrance; signed as exits 30A (west) and 30B (east); eastern terminus of IL 68
Cook	Northbrook	37.3	60.0		I-94 Toll west (Edens Spur) – Milwaukee	Northern end of I-94 overlap; interchange; northbound exit and southbound entrance; I-94 exit 29
Cook–Lake county line	Northbrook–Highland Park city line	37.8	60.8	—	Lake Cook Road	
Lake	Highland Park	38.4	61.8	—	Clavey Road, Skokie Valley Road	
Lake	Highland Park	38.8	62.4		Chantilly Road	Northbound exit and entrance
Lake	Highland Park	40.0	64.4	—	Central Avenue, Deerfield Road	
Lake	Highland Park			Northern end of freeway		
Lake	Highland Park	41.5	66.8		IL 22 west (Half Day Road)	Separate jughandle ramps for traffic exiting onto IL 22; eastern terminus of IL 22
Lake	Lake Forest	44.7	71.9		IL 60 west (Kennedy Road)	Eastern terminus of IL 60
Lake	Lake Forest	45.2	72.7	—	Deerpath Road	
Lake	Lake Bluff	47.5	76.4		IL 176 (Rockland Road)	Southbound traffic exits via Washington Avenue/Shagbark Road; northbound traffic exits via Skokie Valley Road
Lake	North Chicago	49.6	79.8		IL 137 (Buckley Road)	
Lake	Waukegan	51.6	83.0	—	Northpoint Boulevard	Southbound exit and entrance
Lake	Waukegan	52.0	83.7	—	Old Skokie Highway	Northbound exit and entrance
Lake	Waukegan	52.4	84.3	—	IL 120 (Belvidere Road)	Interchange
Lake	Waukegan	52.7	84.8	—	IL 43 south (Waukegan Road)	Northbound traffic from IL-43 merges onto northbound U.S. Route 41; southbound traffic from U.S. 41 to IL-43 South and IL-120 West use the same ramp; northern terminus of IL 43
Lake	Gurnee	53.2	85.6	—	Washington Street	Interchange; northbound ramp also goes to Old Skokie Highway
Lake	Gurnee	54.0	86.9	—	IL 132 (Grand Avenue)	Northbound ramp also goes to Grandville Avenue
Lake	Gurnee	56.1	90.3		IL 21 north (Riverside Drive)	Northern terminus of IL 21
Lake	Wadsworth	59.0– 61.6	95.0– 99.1		IL 173 (Rosecrans Road)	
Lake	Wadsworth	62.8	101.1		I-94 Toll east (Tri-State Tollway) – Chicago, Indiana I-41 begins	Southern end of I-41/I-94 concurrency; southern terminus of I-41; southern end of freeway; southbound exit and northbound entrance; I-94 exit 1B
Lake	Wadsworth	63.3	101.9	1	CR A1 (Russell Road)	Signed as exit 1A southbound
Lake	Wadsworth	64.81	104.30		I-41 north / I-94 west / US 41 north – Milwaukee	Continuation into Wisconsin
1.000 mi = 1.609 km; 1.000 km = 0.621 mi: Concurrency terminus; Incomplete access; Route transition

== Notes ==
U.S. Route 41
Previous state: Indiana	Illinois	Next state: Wisconsin
