= Illinois Route 21 =

State highway in northeastern Illinois, US

Illinois Route 21
- Milwaukee Avenue; Riverside Drive
- IL 21 highlighted in red

Route information
- Maintained by IDOT
- Length: 28.13 mi (45.27 km)
- Existed: November 5, 1918–present

Major junctions
- South end: IL 43 in Niles
- US 14 in Niles; US 45 in Prospect Heights; US 45 in Lincolnshire I-94 Toll in Gurnee
- North end: US 41 in Gurnee

Location
- Country: United States
- State: Illinois
- Counties: Cook, Lake

Highway system
- Illinois State Highway System; Interstate; US; State; Tollways; Scenic
← US 20	→ IL 22

Illinois Route 21 (IL 21) is an arterial north–south state highway in northeastern Illinois. It runs from Illinois Route 43 (Harlem Avenue) in Niles to U.S. Route 41 (Skokie Highway) north of Gurnee. Illinois 21 is 28.13 miles (45.27 km) long.

Along most of its length, Illinois 21 is called Milwaukee Avenue. North of Gurnee, it is called Riverside Drive.

== Route description ==
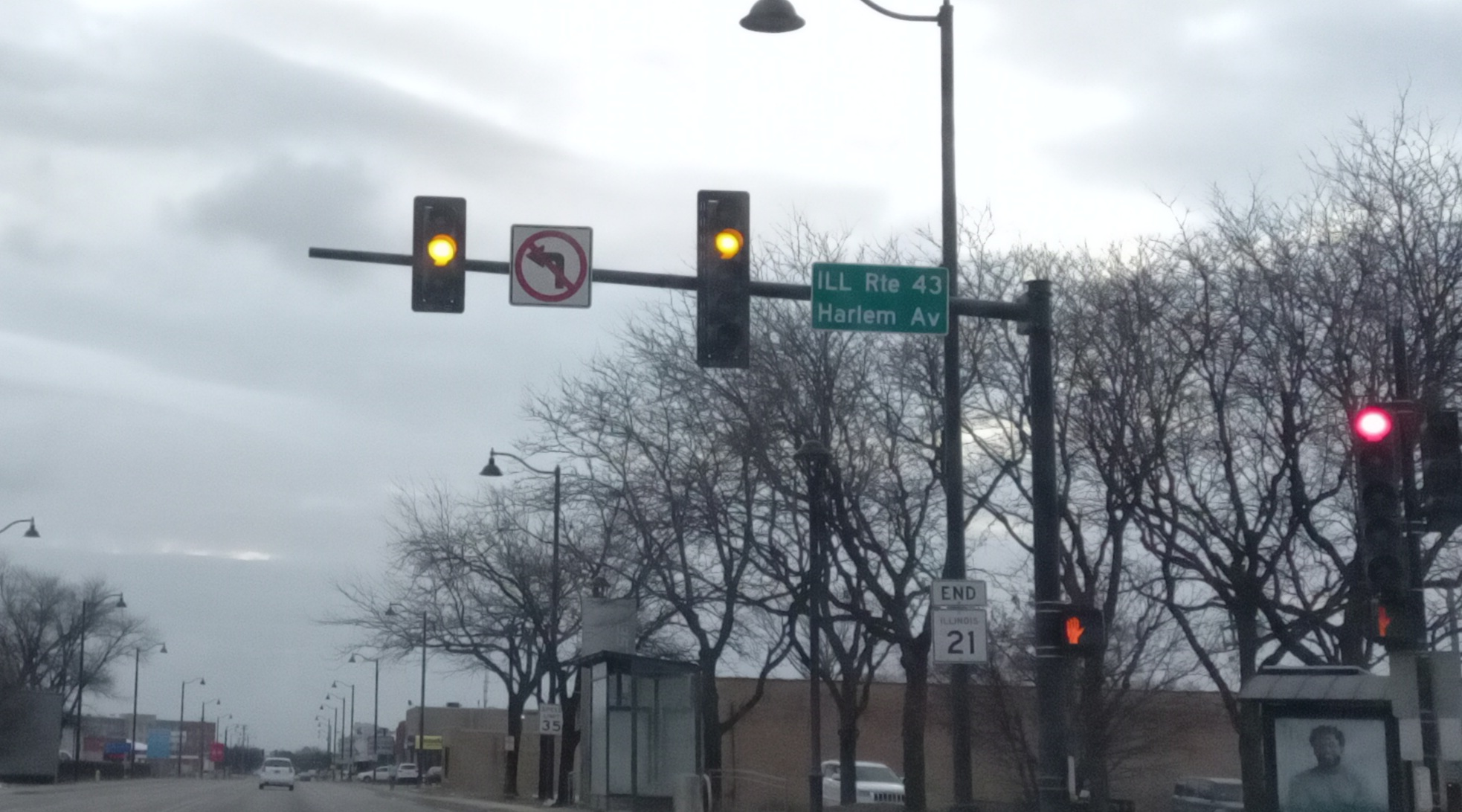
Southern terminus of IL 21 at IL 43

Illinois 21 was the principal route to Milwaukee, Wisconsin before the construction of both the Skokie Highway and the Tri-State Tollway (Interstate 94 and Interstate 294). The towns of Glenview, Libertyville, and Gurnee are principally located along this road. It follows the Des Plaines River for its entire length, and overlaps U.S. Route 45 between Lincolnshire and Prospect Heights.

South of Illinois 43, Milwaukee Avenue remains a major arterial road until it reaches the downtown area of Chicago, where its historical terminus at Lake Street has been moved back to Grand Avenue. It is one of the few diagonal streets in the grid street layout of Chicago.

== History ==
SBI Route 21 ran from Chicago to Antioch along Milwaukee Avenue and current Illinois Routes 43, 83 and 137. In Chicago, it also ran along Elston Avenue. In 1940, the route was moved to a new route to Grayslake, and then continued to Antioch. In 1963, Illinois 21 was dropped entirely from Grayslake to Antioch, and in 1972, it was shortened further to its current southern terminus at Illinois 43. The next year, Illinois 21 was rerouted to Gurnee. Illinois 83 and 137 replaced the old Route 21 to (and through) Grayslake.

== Major intersections ==
County	Location	mi	km	Destinations	Notes
Cook	Niles	0.0	0.0	IL 43 (Harlem Avenue)	
Cook	Niles	1.9	3.1	US 14 (Dempster Street)	Grade-separated interchange
Cook	Niles	3.0	4.8	IL 58 (Golf Road)	
Cook	Prospect Heights	7.3	11.7	US 45 south (Des Plaines River Road)	South end of US 45 overlap
Cook	Prospect Heights	7.6	12.2	Willow Road, Palatine Road to I-294 Toll	Grade-separated interchange
Cook	Wheeling	10.0	16.1	IL 68 (Dundee Road)	
Cook–Lake county line	Wheeling	11.0	17.7	Lake Cook Road	Grade-separated interchange
Lake	Lincolnshire	14.2	22.9	IL 22 (Half Day Road)	
Lake	Lincolnshire	14.5	23.3	US 45 north	North end of US 45 overlap
Lake	Vernon Hills	17.2	27.7	IL 60 (Town Line Road)	
Lake	Libertyville	20.2	32.5	IL 176 (Park Avenue)	
Lake	Libertyville	21.8	35.1	IL 137 (Peterson Road, Buckley Road)	
Lake	Gurnee	24.7	39.8	IL 120 (Belvidere Road)	Grade-separated interchange
Lake	Gurnee	25.8	41.5	I-94 Toll west (Tri-State Tollway) – Wisconsin	No access to I-94 east or from I-94 west; I-94 exit 10
Lake	Gurnee	27.0	43.5	IL 132 (Grand Avenue)	
Lake	Gurnee	28.13	45.27	US 41 (Skokie Highway)	
1.000 mi = 1.609 km; 1.000 km = 0.621 mi: Concurrency terminus; Incomplete access
