= U.S. Route 12 in Illinois =

Section of U.S. Highway in Illinois

U.S. Route 12
- Iron Brigade Memorial Highway
- US 12 highlighted in red

Route information
- Maintained by IDOT and CDOT
- Length: 85.14 mi (137.02 km)
- Existed: 1928–present

Major junctions
- West end: US 12 near Richmond
- US 14 / US 45 in Des Plaines; I-190 in Chicago; US 20 in Stone Park; I-290 / IL 110 (CKC) in Westchester; US 34 in La Grange; I-55 in Hodgkins; US 45 in Hickory Hills; I-294 Toll in Bridgeview; I-94 in Chicago; US 41 in Chicago
- East end: US 12 / US 20 / US 41 in Chicago

Location
- Country: United States
- State: Illinois
- Counties: McHenry, Lake, Cook

Highway system
- United States Numbered Highway System; List; Special; Divided; Illinois State Highway System; Interstate; US; State; Tollways; Scenic
| ← IL 10 | → IL 13 |

U.S. Route 12 (US 12) in the U.S. state of Illinois is an arterial highway that runs northwest to southeast through the Chicago metropolitan area. It enters Illinois at the Wisconsin border north of Richmond, and exits into Hammond, Indiana, from Chicago near the foot of the onramp to the Indiana Toll Road (Interstate 90, or I-90); as it exits Illinois, the route is also concurrent with US 20 and US 41. Within Illinois, US 12 runs for a distance of 85.14 miles (137.02 km).

== Route description ==
=== Richmond to Des Plaines ===
The westernmost portion of US 12 in Illinois runs south from the Wisconsin border, between Genoa City, Wisconsin, and Richmond. North of Genoa City, US 12 is a four-lane limited-access freeway. In Illinois, it reverts to a two-lane, undivided surface road prior to a traffic light with Illinois Route 173 (IL 173) north of Richmond. South of Richmond, through traffic on US 12 must turn left at IL 31 to continue. It continues to the Fox Lake area, at which point it becomes a four-lane divided highway, with occasional interchanges.

US 12 runs concurrently with IL 59 south of Fox Lake at an access-controlled interchange, and then intersects with IL 134 at a traffic light. In Volo, there is a traffic light with IL 120, but then reverts to an expressway, with interchanges for IL 176 (Liberty Street) and IL 59. From the state line to this point, US 12 is also marked as the main route for the Fox River Valley, which continues south on IL 59.

In Lake Zurich, US 12 picks up the name Rand Road, named so for a former name of the city of Des Plaines. There is also an intersection with IL 22 (Main Street). US 12 proceeds toward Deer Park and Kildeer before entering Cook County in Palatine. US 12 then briefly overlaps IL 53 between Hicks Road and IL 68 (Dundee Road) in northeast Palatine. At the expressway portion of IL 53, US 12 traffic can only access southbound IL 53.

From IL 53, US 12 travels through the heavily populated areas of Arlington Heights and Mount Prospect, intersecting with IL 83 (Elmhurst Road) in Mount Prospect. US 12 enters the Des Plaines area at IL 58 (Golf Road) and joins with US 45 (Des Plaines River Road) north of downtown.

In Des Plaines, US 12/US 45 separates, as southbound traffic travels on Graceland Avenue, while northbound traffic runs one block east. In downtown Des Plaines, US 12/45 has a major intersection with US 14 (Miner Street) at a busy at-grade crossing with the Harvard Subdivision of the Union Pacific Railroad.

=== Des Plaines to Hickory Hills ===
After turning south from Des Plaines, US 12/US 45 forms a major north–south artery through the western suburbs. North of Cermak Road, the route is known as Mannheim Road, while, south of Cermak Road, it is known as La Grange Road. The distance from the intersection of US 12/US 45 and US 14 in Des Plaines to the US 12/US 20/US 45 split in Hickory Hills is 9.97 miles (16.05 km).

US 12/US 45 runs through various streets in Des Plaines before following Mannheim Road north of O'Hare International Airport. This routing also closely parallels the north–south orientation of the Canadian National Railway rail line. US 12/US 45 intersects IL 72 (Higgins Road) at the northeast corner of the airport and then travels south along the eastern border of the airport. There is a full interchange with I-190 for passenger airport traffic. At the southeast corner of the airport, a signalized intersection terminates a brief expressway portion of IL 19 (Irving Park Road).

South of Irving Park Road, US 12/US 45 travels beneath the Bensenville Bridge on I-294 (Tri-State Tollway) while also crossing over the Canadian Pacific Kansas City railyard in Franklin Park; however, there is no interchange with I-294 at this point. This rail line also carries the Metra's Milwaukee District West Line trains. In Melrose Park, US 12/US 45 has a grade-separated intersection with IL 64 (North Avenue), a major east–west artery west of Chicago. About a mile (1.6 km) south, US 20 joins with US 12/US 45 to form a triple concurrency over the Union Pacific Railroad's Proviso Yard as well as the mainline tracks of the Geneva Subdivision (Union Pacific West Line).

US 12/US 20/US 45 continues south and becomes the eastern endpoints of two state routes: IL 56 in Bellwood and IL 38 in Westchester. In between lies a full intersection with I-290 (Eisenhower Expressway). In downtown La Grange, US 12/US 20/US 45 intersects with US 34 (Ogden Avenue), making it the only location in the Chicago area (and possibly the state of Illinois) where four U.S. Highways intersect. In addition, there is a level-grade crossing with BNSF Railway tracks very near the intersection, which leads to frequent traffic backups and delays.

South of La Grange, US 12/US 20/US 45 has a full interchange with I-55 (Stevenson Expressway). It then crosses the Des Plaines River and Chicago Sanitary and Ship Canal before a complex interchange with IL 171 (Archer Avenue). A ramp from I-294 to US 12/US 20/US 45 formerly existed but was removed in the late 1990s due to safety concerns. Just south of the Tri-State Tollway, US 12/US 20/US 45 becomes southbound 96th Avenue, passing through the Forest Preserve District of Cook County for nearly two miles (3.2 km) before US 12/US 20 split from US 45 onto eastbound 95th Street.

=== Hickory Hills to Chicago ===
After turning off the US 45 routing in Hickory Hills, US 12/US 20 runs east on 95th Street for 16.31 miles (26.25 km)—combined with a concurrency with US 41, this segment runs for an additional 18.02 miles (29.00 km) into the state of Indiana.

The 95th Street portion of US 12/US 20 is a four-lane undivided arterial surface street through the southern suburbs of Palos Hills, Bridgeview, Oak Lawn, and Evergreen Park. It serves the main commercial areas of these communities and the Chicago south side neighborhoods of Beverly, Washington Heights, Roseland, Burnside, Pullman, Calumet Heights, South Deering, and East Side.

In Bridgeview, US 12/US 20 has interchanges with I-294 and IL 43 (Harlem Avenue). In Oak Lawn, it intersects IL 50 (Cicero Avenue). Further east, in Chicago, US 12/US 20 nearly intersects IL 1 (Halsted Street); IL 1 technically terminates at I-57 a half mile (0.80 km) south. US 12/US 20 then has an interchange with I-94 (Dan Ryan Expressway) just north of the I-57/I-94 split. Shortly after bridging the Calumet River, US 12/US 20 joins with US 41.

The concurrent US 12/US 20/US 41 combination runs south on Ewing Avenue beneath the Chicago Skyway, narrowing from two northbound and southbound lanes to one northbound and one southbound lane before turning onto Indianapolis Boulevard, a six-lane divided highway. At 104th Street, there is a traffic light for a relocated offramp (from 106th Street) from the Chicago Skyway to Indianapolis Boulevard. The southbound onramp to the Indiana Toll Road is still located at 106th Street.

The Illinois portion of US 12/US 20/US 41 terminates beneath the I-90 bridge over Indianapolis Boulevard; this is also where the Chicago Skyway becomes the Indiana Toll Road.

== History ==
In 1928, US 12 followed its current route south from Wisconsin into Richmond. It then continued straight on what is now IL 31 to Crystal Lake and then ran along what is now US 14 into Chicago. This route began to be depicted on Chicago maps in 1932 along the Northwest Highway, Foster Avenue, Lake Shore Drive, South Parkway (now most likely the 57th Street/Cornell Avenue combination), Stony Island Avenue, and 95th Street.

From 1928 to 1929, the section between the Wisconsin state line to Crystal Lake was being constructed; this segment was designated Temporary U.S. Route 12 (Temp. US 12) at the time.

In 1938, US 12 was moved north off the US 14 routing to the current routing to Des Plaines. In addition, US 12 was moved to what is now Mannheim Road, La Grange Road, and 95th Street. The former US 12 became U.S. Route 12 City (US 12 City).

In 1939, US 12 was moved to a bypass around Lake Zurich and widened to four lanes. Old Rand Road was the name given to the former US 12 alignment. The original 1939 Elgin, Joliet and Eastern Railway Railroad 4 span concrete bridge over the US 12 bypass remains in Lake Zurich with telegraph poles visible on the bridge. The original pot hole full 1939 asphalt pavement has since been resurfaced including replacing with concrete lanes and widening from through lanes to six through lanes between IL 22 and Ela Road in a project in 2007.

In the early 1950s, US 12 was moved to a bypass around Wauconda and widened to four lanes extending to IL 120 in Volo. Old Rand Road was the name given to the former US 12 alignment. The original pothole-full 1950s asphalt pavement with double yellow lines visible in the west bound lanes between Old McHenry and Old Rand roads has since been resurfaced in 2013. Mature trees in the interchange grassy areas and 1950s style motels remain in Wauconda.

In the late 1950s, US 12 was widened to four lanes extending to Fox Lake. Mature trees lining the frontage roads and 1950s-style motels and diners remain in Fox Lake. US 12 in Illinois has not been widened further northwest since then.

There were no further changes to the US 12 routing until 1960, when US 12 City became U.S. Route 12 Business (US 12 Bus.). In 1963, US 12 was moved onto the Chicago Skyway and became U.S. Route 12 Toll Business (US 12 Toll Bus.) until 1968, when all US 12 Bus. designations were dropped.

In Illinois, the highway has been designated as the Iron Brigade Memorial Highway to honor the Civil War Union Army unit, a designation it also has in Michigan, Indiana, and Wisconsin.

== Major intersections ==
All exits are unnumbered.

| County | Location | mi | km | Destinations | Notes |
|---|---|---|---|---|---|
| McHenry | Richmond | 0.00 | 0.00 | US 12 west – Lake Geneva | Continuation into Wisconsin |
| McHenry | Richmond | 1.1 | 1.8 | IL 173 (Kenosha Street) | |
| McHenry | Richmond | 3.1 | 5.0 | IL 31 south (Richmond Road) – McHenry | Northern terminus of IL 31 |
| Lake | Fox Lake | 13.0 | 20.9 | IL 59 north | Western end of IL 59 concurrency; westbound exit and eastbound entrance |
| Lake | Fox Lake | 13.5 | 21.7 | IL 134 east (Big Hollow Road) | Western terminus of IL 134 |
| Lake | Volo | 16.8 | 27.0 | IL 120 (Belvidere Road) | |
| Lake | Wauconda | 21.4 | 34.4 | IL 176 (Liberty Street) | Diamond interchange |
| Lake | Wauconda | 22.0 | 35.4 | IL 59 south (Barrington Road) | Eastern end of IL 59 concurrency; westbound entrance and eastbound exit |
| Lake | Lake Zurich | 27.3 | 43.9 | IL 22 (Main Street) | |
| Cook | Palatine | 32.2 | 51.8 | IL 53 north (Hicks Road) | Western end of IL 53 concurrency |
| Cook | Palatine | 33.0 | 53.1 | IL 53 south / IL 68 (Dundee Road) | Eastern end of IL 53 concurrency |
| Cook | Arlington Heights | 34.2 | 55.0 | IL 53 south | Partial diamond interchange |
| Cook | Mount Prospect | 39.0 | 62.8 | IL 83 (Elmhurst Road, Main Street) | |
| Cook | Des Plaines | 41.8 | 67.3 | IL 58 (Golf Road) | |
| Cook | Des Plaines | 42.6 | 68.6 | US 45 north (Des Plaines River Road north) | Western end of US 45 concurrency |
| Cook | Des Plaines | 43.1 | 69.4 | US 14 (Miner Street) | |
| Cook | Rosemont–Chicago line | 46.4 | 74.7 | IL 72 (Higgins Road) | |
| Cook | Chicago | | | Economy Parking F, Rental Car Return | West end of expressway; no eastbound exit |
| Cook | Chicago | 47.7 | 76.8 | I-190 (Kennedy Expressway) – Chicago, O'Hare | Parclo interchange; no direct access from I-190 EB; I-190 west exits 2A-B |
| Cook | Chicago–Schiller Park line | | | Balmoral Avenue | East end of expressway |
| Cook | Schiller Park | 48.7 | 78.4 | IL 19 (Irving Park Road) to I-294 Toll north | |
| Cook | Franklin Park | | | Frontage Road | Interchange via connector roads |
| Cook | Melrose Park–Stone Park line | 53.0 | 85.3 | IL 64 (North Avenue) | |
| Cook | Melrose Park–Stone Park line | 53.7 | 86.4 | US 20 west (Lake Street) | Western end of US 20 concurrency |
| Cook | Bellwood–Hillside line | 54.8 | 88.2 | IL 56 west (Washington Boulevard) | Eastern terminus of IL 56 |
| Cook | Hillside–Westchester line | 55.6 | 89.5 | I-290 / IL 110 (CKC) | I-290 exit 17 |
| Cook | Hillside–Westchester line | 56.1 | 90.3 | IL 38 west (Roosevelt Road) | Eastern terminus of IL 38 |
| Cook | La Grange | 59.3 | 95.4 | US 34 (Ogden Avenue) | |
| Cook | Countryside–Hodgkins line | 62.0 | 99.8 | Historic US 66 (Joliet Road) | |
| Cook | Countryside–Hodgkins line | 63.2 | 101.7 | I-55 (Stevenson Expressway) to I-294 Toll north – Chicago, St. Louis | I-55 exit 279 |
| Cook | Willow Springs | 64.7 | 104.1 | IL 171 (Archer Avenue) to 79th Street / I-294 Toll south (Tri-State Tollway) – Indiana | Cloverleaf interchange; left exit eastbound |
| Cook | Hickory Hills | 66.5 | 107.0 | US 45 south (La Grange Road south) | Eastern end of US 45 overlap |
| Cook | Bridgeview | 68.8 | 110.7 | I-294 Toll (Tri-State Tollway) – Wisconsin, Indiana | Tolled; I-294 exit 17 |
| Cook | Bridgeview | 69.2 | 111.4 | IL 43 (Harlem Avenue) | Cloverleaf interchange |
| Cook | Oak Lawn | 71.7 | 115.4 | IL 50 (Cicero Avenue) | |
| Cook | Chicago | 77.3 | 124.4 | Halsted Street to I-57 / I-94 east / IL 1 | |
| Cook | Chicago | 78.3 | 126.0 | I-94 west (Dan Ryan Expressway) | I-94 exit 62 |
| Cook | Chicago | 80.3 | 129.2 | Stoney Island Avenue to I-94 | Northern terminus of Stony Island Avenue expressway (southbound); at-grade street northbound |
| Cook | Chicago | 82.8 | 133.3 | US 41 north / LMCT (Ewing Avenue north) | Western end of US 41 overlap |
| Cook | Chicago | 84.3 | 135.7 | I-90 Toll west / Chicago Skyway west (Toll Bridge) | Signed as "To I-90 west"; access to I-90 east is in Indiana; I-90 exit 107 |
| Cook | Chicago | 84.4 | 135.8 | US 12 east / US 20 east / US 41 south / LMCT (Indianapolis Boulevard) – Hammond | Continuation into Indiana |
1.000 mi = 1.609 km; 1.000 km = 0.621 mi: Concurrency terminus; Electronic toll collection; Incomplete access

U.S. Route 12
| Previous state: Wisconsin | Illinois | Next state: Indiana |
