= Scenic highways in Illinois =

Illinois Scenic Byways

Highway names
- Interstates: Interstate X (I-X)
- US Highways: U.S. Route X (US X)
- State: Illinois Route X (IL X)

System links
- Illinois State Highway System; Interstate; US; State; Tollways; Scenic

== List ==
List of Illinois Byways
Name	Southern or western terminus	Northern or eastern terminus	Length		Date	Description	Ref(s).
Name	Southern or western terminus	Northern or eastern terminus	mi	km	Date	Description	Ref(s).
Ohio River Scenic Byway	Kentucky state line in Cairo	Indiana state line				Closely parallels the Ohio River in Illinois	
Illinois River Road	Havana, Illinois, East Laural Street (U.S. Route 136) at South Charlotte Street.	Ottawa, Illinois, Washington Square Park				Parallels the Illinois River along both banks.	
Lincoln Highway	Iowa state line	Indiana state line			October 4, 2011	Follows the Illinois portion of the original route of the Lincoln Highway	
Historic Route 66 Scenic Byway	Chicago	Martin Luther King Bridge at the Missouri state line in East St. Louis					
