= Warren-Newport Public Library District =

Public library in Illinois, US

- 42°21′47.6″N 87°54′55″W
- Location: 224 O'Plaine Rd, Gurnee, Illinois, USA
- Type: Public library
- Established: January 10, 1973
- Service area: Lake County: Gurnee, Grandwood Park, Park City, Wildwood. Partially included: Beach Park, Grayslake, Lake Villa, Old Mill Creek, Third Lake, Wadsworth, Waukegan, Milburn

Collection
- Size: 318,041

Access and use
- Circulation: 777,000
- Population served: 66,690
- Members: 42,850

Other information
- Budget: $6.8 million
- Director: Ryan Livergood
- Website: www.wnpl.info

The Warren-Newport Public Library is located in Gurnee, Illinois. The library serves 60,000 people within a 55-square-mile (140 km^{2}) area that covers all or most of Warren Township and Newport Township, Illinois. The library is a member of the Reaching Across Illinois Library System (RAILS).

== Overview ==
Lake County, Illinois communities that fall completely within the boundaries of the district are Gurnee; Grandwood Park; Park City; and Wildwood. Partially included in the district are the communities of Beach Park; Grayslake; Lake Villa; Old Mill Creek; Third Lake; Wadsworth; Waukegan; and Milburn.

The Warren-Newport Public Library District began in 1971 when the Gurnee Women's Club began to look for a meaningful service which their club could offer the area. The library opened on January 10, 1973. The library opened its doors for 45 hours per week with 3,000 volumes. The library moved into its current location in 1978, and in 1997 opened a $5.6 million, 31,000-square-foot (2,900 m^{2}) addition.

In 2004, the library was an early adopter of passive RFID (radio frequency identification) technology to automate item check-in.

In April 2010, the library began an extensive expansion and renovation project, which was completed in December 2011. The building was expanded by about 4,500 square feet, and an additional 28,000 square feet were renovated. Improvements included additional study and community meeting rooms, a new teen space, and a new home for the Friends of the Library-sponsored used book sales.

In November 2011, November 2012, and November 2013, the Chicago Tribune named the Warren-Newport Public Library one of the Top 100 Places to Work in the Chicago area.

According to statistics gathered by the Library Research Center at the University of Illinois, the Warren-Newport Public Library is the second busiest library in Lake County, after the Cook Memorial Library in Libertyville.

According to its mission statement, the Warren Newport Public Library "provides the community with access to information, kindles the imagination of children and adults, and supports lifelong learning." The Warren-Newport Public Library offers a collection of over 155,000 books, hundreds of magazines, and over 40,000 CDs and DVDs, as well as programming for all ages designed to provide personal enrichment, education, and entertainment. The library also delivers bookmobile service to 47 neighborhoods five days a week.
