= Mill Creek (Des Plaines River tributary) =

River in Illinois, United States

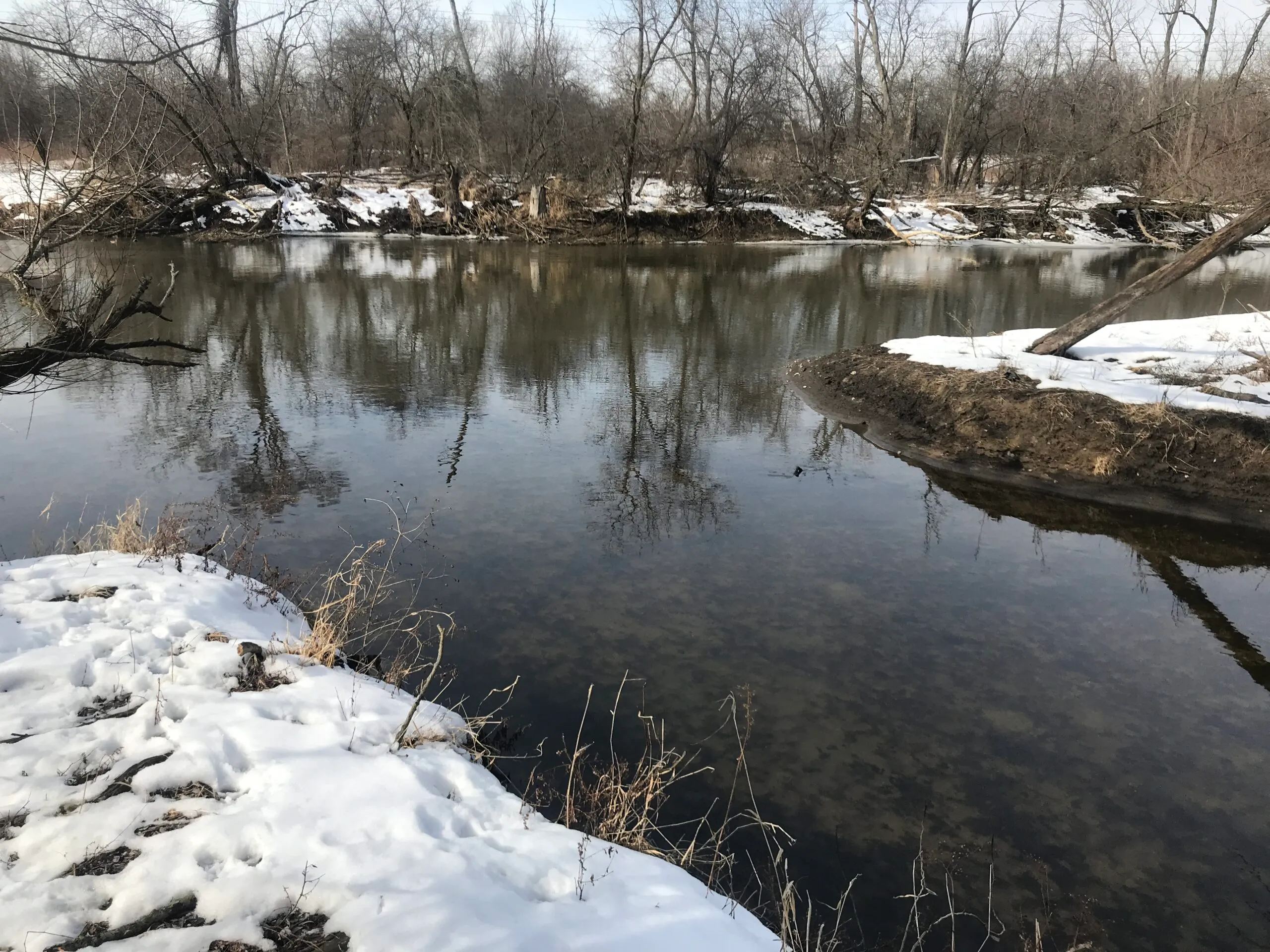
- Confluence of Mill Creek (bottom-right) and the Des Plaines River in Gurnee (2023)

- Mill Creek

Location
- Country: United States
- State: Illinois
- County: Lake

Physical characteristics
- Mouth: Des Plaines River
  - coordinates: 42°25′04″N 87°55′56″W
- Length: 15 miles (24 km)
- Depth
  - average: 6.51 ft (1.98 m)

Basin features
- Progression: Mill Creek → Des Plaines River → Illinois River → Mississippi River → Gulf of Mexico

Mill Creek is a tributary of the Des Plaines River, roughly 15 miles (24 km) long and located entirely within Lake County, Illinois. Mill Creek begins in the village of Grayslake and flows into the Des Plaines River at the 26.5 river mile within the village of Gurnee. Upkeep is done by the Lake County Forest Preserve District.

== History ==
In 1838 a man known by the name of Jacob Miller built a sawmill along the tributary somewhere near the village of Old Mill Creek in addition to the first flouring mill of Lake County. However, this year is debated and historians believe it could have been built as early as 1834, but no later than 1840. This date is historically significant as this could mean that the name either predates or came after the formation of Lake County by the Illinois State Legislature in 1839. The exact location of the sawmill is also lost to history, though it is said that it was located "not far from the town line now separating Warren from Newport." Likely near where modern day West Millburn Road and Ancona Avenue would have met. It is also seen on maps that a structure listed as Chittenden's Mill was located in what is now the census-designated place of Grandwood Park by 1849. Said gristmill is now gone.

Mill Creek has been labeled on maps of the state and county as early as 1840.

In 1941 an unnamed farmer built a small timber dam on Mill Creek in what is now Grandwood Park. This consequently formed Grandwood Lake that same year. The dam was partially destroyed due to heavy rains in northern Illinois in 2017 and was replaced with one made of concrete in 2019.

The Des Plaines River Trail crosses the confluence of the two rivers in the Sedge Meadow Forest Preserve.
