= Newport Township, Illinois =

Township in the United States

Newport Township
- Township
- Location in Lake County

- Lake County's location in Illinois
- Coordinates: 42°27′12″N 87°56′28″W
- Country: United States
- State: Illinois
- County: Lake
- Established: November 6, 1849

Area
  - Total: 32.38 sq mi (83.9 km^{2})
  - Land: 31.86 sq mi (82.5 km^{2})
  - Water: 0.52 sq mi (1.3 km^{2}) 1.60%
- Elevation: 669 ft (204 m)

Population (2020)
  - Total: 6,831
  - Density: 214.4/sq mi (82.78/km^{2})
- Time zone: UTC-6 (CST)
  - Summer (DST): UTC-5 (CDT)
- FIPS code: 17-097-52753
- Website: www.newporttownshipil.com

Newport Township is a township in Lake County, Illinois, USA. As of the 2020 census, its population was 6,831. It includes most parts of the villages of Old Mill Creek and Wadsworth, as well as smaller portions of the villages of Antioch, Beach Park, and a corner of the city of Waukegan. The unincorporated communities of Rosecrans and Russell are also within the township, and the unincorporated community of Millburn is also located partially within Newport Township.

== Geography ==
According to the 2021 census gazetteer files, Newport Township has a total area of 32.38 square miles (83.86 km^{2}), of which 31.86 square miles (82.52 km^{2}) (or 98.40%) is land and 0.52 square miles (1.35 km^{2}) (or 1.60%) is water. Lakes in this township include Sterling Lake. The streams of Mill Creek, North Mill Creek and Pettibone Creek run through this township.

=== Cities and towns ===
- Old Mill Creek (northeast three-quarters)
- Wadsworth (majority)
- Waukegan (partial)
- Zion (unincorporated parts)

=== Other Communities ===
- Eddy at 42.461411°N 87.898407°W
- Rosecrans
- Russell

=== Adjacent townships/villages ===
- Pleasant Prairie, Wisconsin (northeast)
- Bristol, Wisconsin (northwest)
- Benton Township (east)
- Zion Township (east)
- Waukegan Township (southeast)
- Warren Township (south)
- Antioch Township (west)
- Lake Villa Township (west)

=== Cemeteries ===
The township contains four cemeteries: Millburn, Mount Rest, Oakdale and Saint Patricks.

=== Airports and landing strips ===
- Herbert C Maas Airport

== Demographics ==
As of the 2020 census, there were 6,831 people, 2,443 households, and 1,882 families residing in the township. The population density was 210.98 inhabitants per square mile (81.46/km^{2}). There were 2,551 housing units at an average density of 78.79 per square mile (30.42/km^{2}). The racial makeup of the township was 58.69% White, 11.43% African American, 0.67% Native American, 8.90% Asian, 0.00% Pacific Islander, 9.72% from other races, and 10.58% from two or more races. Hispanic or Latino of any race were 21.07% of the population.

There were 2,443 households, out of which 24.20% had children under the age of 18 living with them, 68.28% were married couples living together, 2.82% had a female householder with no spouse present, and 22.96% were non-families. 20.70% of all households were made up of individuals, and 10.10% had someone living alone who was 65 years of age or older. The average household size was 2.75 and the average family size was 3.19.

The township's age distribution consisted of 21.1% under the age of 18, 11.2% from 18 to 24, 16.2% from 25 to 44, 29.2% from 45 to 64, and 22.4% who were 65 years of age or older. The median age was 47.2 years. For every 100 females, there were 115.4 males. For every 100 females age 18 and over, there were 114.9 males.

The median income for a household in the township was $85,347, and the median income for a family was $99,167. Males had a median income of $63,477 versus $31,123 for females. The per capita income for the township was $40,356. About 1.3% of families and 2.4% of the population were below the poverty line, including 6.6% of those under age 18 and 0.7% of those age 65 or over.

Historical population
Census	Pop.	Note	%±
2010	6,770		—
2020	6,831		0.9%
U.S. Decennial Census

== Education ==
=== Gurnee School District 56 ===
The schools in the district include:

==== Public elementary/middle schools ====
- Spaulding Elementary School, Gurnee, grades PK-2
- O Plaine Intermediate School, Gurnee, grades 3-5
- Viking Middle School, Gurnee, grades 6-8
- Woodland Elementary School, Gurnee K-3
- Woodland Intermediate School, Gurnee, grades 4-5
- Woodland Middle School, Gurnee, grades 6-8
- Gurnee Grade School, Gurnee, grades K-8

==== Public high school ====
- Warren Township High School, Gurnee, grades 9-12

==== Private elementary/middle schools ====
- S Da Christian School of Lake County, grades KG-8

=== Antioch Community Consolidated School District 34 ===
The schools in the district include:

==== Public elementary schools ====
- Hillcrest Elementary School, Antioch, grades PK-2
- Antioch Elementary School, Antioch, grades 2-5
- Oakland Elementary School, Antioch, grades 2-5
- W C Petty Elementary School, Antioch, grades 2-5
- Emmons Grade School, Antioch, grades K-8
- Grass Lake Grade School, Antioch, grades PK-8

==== Public middle school ====
- Antioch Middle School, Antioch, grades 6-8

==== Public high school ====
- Antioch Community High School, Antioch, grades 9-12

==== Private elementary/middle schools ====
- St Peter Catholic School, Antioch, grades KG-8
- Faith Evangelical Lutheran School, Antioch, grades PK-8

=== Beach Park Community Consolidated School District 3 ===
The schools in the district include:

==== Public elementary schools ====
- Howe Elementary School, Beach Park, grades K-5
- Kenneth Murphy Elementary School, Beach Park, grades K-5
- Newport Elementary School, Wadsworth, grades K-5
- Oak Crest Elementary School, Zion, grades K-5

==== Public middle school ====
- Beach Park Middle School, Beach Park, grades 6-8

=== Millburn Community Consolidated School District 24 ===
The schools in the district include:

- Millburn Elementary School (formerly Millburn Central), Wadsworth, grades K-5
- Millburn Middle School (formerly Millburn West), Lindenhurst, grades 6-8
