= Grandwood Park, Illinois =

Census designated place

Grandwood Park
- Census-designated place
- Motto: "Lake County's Best Kept Secret"
- Location in Illinois Location in the United States
- Coordinates: 42°23′38″N 87°59′52″W
- Country: United States
- State: Illinois
- County: Lake
- Township: Warren

Area
  - Total: 1.47 sq mi (3.80 km^{2})
  - Land: 1.45 sq mi (3.75 km^{2})
  - Water: 0.019 sq mi (0.05 km^{2})
- Elevation: 745 ft (227 m)

Population (2020)
  - Total: 5,297
  - Density: 3,658.2/sq mi (1,412.45/km^{2})
- Time zone: UTC-6 (CST)
  - Summer (DST): UTC-5 (CDT)
- ZIP Code: 60031 (Gurnee)
- Area codes: 224, 847
- FIPS code: 17-30900
- GNIS feature ID: 2393022

Grandwood Park is a census-designated place (CDP) in Warren Township, Lake County, Illinois, United States. Per the 2020 census, the population was 5,297.

== History ==
Before the Industrial Revolution had made its way to the western Great Lakes, the land remained in the hands of the Potawatomi until the 1833 Treaty of Chicago. Small farm families dotted the land for several decades until 1873, of which a train station was built along the Chicago, Milwaukee, St. Paul and Pacific Railroad in the n eighboring village (once an unincorporated area) of Gurnee. This over time caused an increase in the local population.

One of the earliest accounts of an individual living in the immediate community was a farmer in 1941. This farmer is credited for constructing a dam that barred Mill Creek and consequently formed Grandwood Lake that same year.

Development of the area began in the early 1960s and it started to receive fire and police support from Gurnee. The Grandwood Park Civic Association was established in 1962.

The Grandwood Park Park District was established in 1965. It acts as a municipal governing agency providing parks, recreation facilities, and events/programs for residents.

=== Des Plaines River Flood of 2017 ===
After heavy rains in Grandwood Park and surrounding areas of Warren Township, in July, 2017, the dam barring Mill Creek to Grandwood Lake partially failed. Flooding averaging a foot in depth consumed adjoining Lake Park and nearby residences. For two weeks following the incident a variety of fish were found swimming on the park grounds and in yards, notably grass carp. Road closures were lifted on the 25th of July.

It was decided that same season that a new dam would ultimately be necessary. It would have to wait until 2019 when the lake was drained and a new concrete and steel dam was built. Original estimates for the project were between $900,000 and $1.7 million. The official number was never released. During a Board of Commissioners session on February 8, 2023, it was proposed that an electric light should be added to Lake Park in order to illuminate the dam. The estimated cost is $2,150.

=== Post - 2020 ===
In 2020 the original bridge built across Mill Creek along North Hutchins Road in 1969, along with the culvert, were dismantled and rebuilt. Traffic was rerouted for nearly four months until the bridge was comepleted on June 18. The estimate price of the project was $1.46 million.

== Geography ==
The community is in north-central Lake County, in the northwestern part of Warren Township. It is bordered to the north by the village of Old Mill Creek, to the west by Lindenhurst, and to the south and east by Gurnee. U.S. Route 45 runs along the west side of the CDP, leading south 9 miles (14 km) to Mundelein and north 12 miles (19 km) to Bristol, Wisconsin. Illinois Route 132 forms the southern boundary of the CDP; it leads east 4 miles (6 km) to Gurnee and northwest 3 miles (5 km) to Lindenhurst. Exit 8 on Interstate 94 is 2 miles (3 km) east of Grandwood Park on Route 132, 44 miles (71 km) north of downtown Chicago.

According to the 2021 census gazetteer files, Grandwood Park has a total area of 1.47 square miles (3.81 km^{2}), of which 1.45 square miles (3.76 km^{2}) (or 98.64%) is land and 0.02 square miles (0.05 km^{2}) (or 1.36%) is water. Grandwood Lake is a small impoundment on Mill Creek in the center of the community.

=== Environment ===
==== Marine Life ====
As it is fed by Mill Creek, the shallow waters of Grandwood Lake harbor a variety of different freshwater fish. This includes an abundancy of many types of panfish such as Bluegill, Pumpkinseed, Redear Sunfish, Warmouth, and Yellow Perch. Sport fish such as Largemouth Bass and the occasional Northern Pike. In addition to some ray-finned fish such as Yellow Bullhead and Grass Carp.

Although it is not officially stated, it is suggested that Smallmouth Bass, Rock Bass, Common Chub, as well as Black Crappie and White Crappie can be found in the lake. No Walleye or Muskellunge have been reported.

==== Bird Life ====
The small marsh-like environment surrounding Grandwood Lake is home to variety of song and water birds. The trees along the edge of the lake are often frequented by the American Robin, the House Sparrow, and a large number of woodpecker species such as the Downy woodpecker. The Red-Winged Blackbird can also be seen perching in patches of bulrush at the lake's edge.

During the mating season some large water birds can be seen feeding from the lake. Which can include but is not limited to the Snowy Egret, the Great Blue Heron, and the Green Heron.

Canada Geese can be found in Grandwood Park and surrounding areas year round.

== Demographics ==
Historical population
Census	Pop.	Note	%±
1990	2,470		—
2000	4,521		83.0%
2010	5,202		15.1%
2020	5,297		1.8%
U.S. Decennial Census; 2010 2020

=== Racial and ethnic composition ===
Grandwood Park CDP, Illinois – Racial and ethnic composition Note: the US Census treats Hispanic/Latino as an ethnic category. This table excludes Latinos from the racial categories and assigns them to a separate category. Hispanics/Latinos may be of any race.
Race / Ethnicity (NH = Non-Hispanic)	Pop 2000	Pop 2010	Pop 2020	% 2000	% 2010	% 2020
White alone (NH)	3,799	3,668	3,196	84.03%	70.51%	60.34%
Black or African American alone (NH)	184	283	366	4.07%	5.44%	6.91%
Native American or Alaska Native alone (NH)	5	1	3	0.11%	0.02%	0.06%
Asian alone (NH)	196	584	635	4.34%	11.23%	11.99%
Native Hawaiian or Pacific Islander alone (NH)	0	1	0	0.00%	0.02%	0.00%
Other race alone (NH)	11	15	40	0.24%	0.29%	0.76%
Mixed race or Multiracial (NH)	74	102	233	1.64%	1.96%	4.40%
Hispanic or Latino (any race)	252	548	824	5.57%	10.53%	15.56%
Total	4,521	5,202	5,297	100.00%	100.00%	100.00%

=== 2020 census ===
As of the 2020 census, Grandwood Park had a population of 5,297 and 1,858 households. The median age was 38.8 years. 25.8% of residents were under the age of 18 and 12.2% were 65 years of age or older. For every 100 females there were 93.5 males, and for every 100 females age 18 and over there were 91.3 males age 18 and over.

100.0% of residents lived in urban areas, while 0.0% lived in rural areas.

Of all households, 38.8% had children under the age of 18 living in them. 63.5% were married-couple households, 11.7% were households with a male householder and no spouse or partner present, and 19.5% were households with a female householder and no spouse or partner present. About 18.4% of all households were made up of individuals, and 6.9% had someone living alone who was 65 years of age or older.

There were 1,910 housing units, of which 2.7% were vacant. The homeowner vacancy rate was 1.7% and the rental vacancy rate was 1.9%.

=== Income and poverty ===
The median income for a household in the CDP was $127,155, and the median income for a family was $149,722. Males had a median income of $84,435 versus $41,827 for females. The per capita income for the CDP was $55,168. About 1.0% of families and 1.9% of the population were below the poverty line, including 2.5% of those under age 18 and 2.3% of those age 65 or over.

== Transportation and public services ==
Grandwood Park is served by the Warren-Newport Public Library District.

Pace Bus - Route 565 runs along Grand Avenue between Waukegan's Metra Station and the College of Lake County in Grayslake. Seven stops are offered alongside the neighborhood.

=== Major streets ===
- Grand Avenue
- US-45
- Stearns School Road
- Hutchins Road
- Grandwood Drive

== Education ==
Most areas are in the Woodland Community Consolidated School District 50 while a small piece is in the Millburn Community Consolidated School District 24. All areas are in the Warren Township High School District 121.
