= Wilson, Illinois =

- Former community
- Location within Illinois Location within the United States
- Coordinates: 42°20′48″N 87°54′22″W
- Country: United States
- State: Illinois
- County: Lake
- Township: Warren
- Elevation: 709 ft (216 m)
- Time zone: UTC-6 (Central (CST))
  - Summer (DST): UTC-5 (CDT)
- GNIS feature ID: 421281

Wilson was an unincorporated community in southern Warren Township, Lake County, Illinois, United States. The community was located along Illinois Route 120 (Belvidere Road) and is now part of the cities of Waukegan and Park City and the village of Gurnee.

== History ==
The community in southern Warren Township was originally known as "Warrenton". In 1873, the Milwaukee & St. Paul Railroad (predecessor to the Milwaukee Road) built a railroad depot in Warrenton, and the following year, Warrenton School was organized. In the early 20th century, entrepreneur Thomas E. Wilson purchased 2,000 acres (810 ha) of land in the area, which became known as the Edellyn Farms estate. The depot, post office and school were eventually renamed "Wilson" in his honor. After World War II, Wilson's identity slowly began to disappear. In 1954, Wilson School was sold for use as a private residence. It was eventually razed to make room for the expansion of Belvidere Road. In 1959, the Milwaukee Road Depot was abandoned and eventually razed. The nearby communities of Gurnee and Waukegan expanded, incorporating large parts of Wilson into their borders. In 1958, other parts of the area were incorporated into Park City to avoid annexation by Waukegan. In 1968, several hundred acres of Edellyn Farms were sold to the city of Waukegan for development as the (now defunct) Lakehurst Mall. Today, very little of the Wilson area remains unincorporated, though the name still appears on topographic maps.
