= Woodland Community Consolidated School District 50 =

School district in Illinois, United States

Address
- 1105 Hunt Club Road Gurnee, Lake County, Illinois, 60031; United States

District information
- Grades: K-8
- Established: 1948; 78 years ago
- Superintendent: Robert Machak
- Asst. superintendent(s): Yuliana Yucus - Executive Assistant to the Superintendent of Schools Laura Campanella - Educational Support Center Administrative Supervisor
- Business administrator: Christopher Bobek - Associate Superintendent, CSBO
- School board: Mrs. Anna Chang-Yen - President Mr. Corey Holmer - Vice President Ms. Gari Matsey - Secretary Dr. Carla Little - Board Member Mrs. Renea Amen, JD - Board Member Mrs. Brianna Powvens - Board Member Mrs. Amy Sabor - Board Member Mrs. Laura Campanella - Board Recording Secretary
- Schools: 4
- NCES District ID: 1743110

Students and staff
- Students: 4,695
- Teachers: 373.2 (FTE)
- Staff: 404.40 (FTE)
- Student–teacher ratio: 16:1
- District mascot: Wiley the Wildcat
- Colors: Green and White

Other information
- Website: dist50.net

Woodland School District 50 is in Lake County, Illinois. The school has approximately 600 students per grade and is the seventh largest school district in Illinois. The district's superintendent is Robert Machak. Members of the district are collectively known as the Wildcats

The district includes portions of Gurnee, Gages Lake, Grandwood Park, Grayslake, Old Mill Creek, Park City, Wadsworth, and Waukegan.

The student population is 4,526 students in the grades of kindergarten through eighth grade. There are four schools: the primary school, the elementary school, the intermediate school, and the middle school. The primary school offers early childhood programs and kindergarten. The elementary school teaches grades one, two, and three. The intermediate school has fourth and fifth grades. Woodland Middle School is the home of grades 6–8.
