= Warren Township High School =

Public school in Lake County, Illinois, United States

Warren Township High School (WTHS)

Location
- Almond Campus: 34090 Almond Road; O'Plaine Campus: 500 N. O'Plaine Road; Gurnee, Lake County, Illinois 60031; United States; 42°22′02″N 87°54′55″W

Information
- School type: Public high school
- Founded: 1917
- School district: Warren Township High School District 121 (WTHS)
- CEEB code: 142175
- Principal: O'Plaine Campus: Michele Bertola; Almond Campus: Rob Parrott
- Faculty: 296
- Grades: 9-12
- Enrollment: 3,687 (2023-2024)
- Student to teacher ratio: 20:1
- Language: English
- Campuses: 2 (O'Plaine and Almond)
- Colors: Royal blue and gold
- Athletics conference: Illinois North Suburban
- Mascot: Blue Devil
- Team name: Blue Devils
- Website: www.d121.org

Warren Township High School (WTHS), or Warren, is a public four-year high school located in Warren Township, Lake County, Illinois. Because of the size of the student body, the school is split across two campuses: the O'Plaine Road Campus in Gurnee for freshmen and sophomores, and the Almond Road Campus in Gages Lake for juniors and seniors. Both campuses are located about 4.5 miles (7.2 km) apart, and have Gurnee postal addresses.

Warren(Almond and O'plane Road Campus) is the sole school of Warren Township High School District 121. The district headquarters is in the Almond Road campus.

== History ==
Warren Township High School District 121 was formed in 1917. Its initial facility was a one-story building on O'Plaine Road. Warren has seen graduating initial classes of about 25 students in the beginning to more than 1000 today. There are more than 4,500 students divided between two campuses, representing one comprehensive high school program for more than 61,000 residents from Gurnee, Beach Park, Gages Lake, Grandwood Park, Grayslake, Lindenhurst, Old Mill Creek, Park City, Third Lake, Wadsworth, Waukegan, Wildwood and Lake Villa.

The first high school was erected in 1917. The one-floor school first opened in the fall of 1918 with 57 pupils in attendance. Between the years 1920 and 1924, a Vocational Agriculture Building and Farm Shop (separate from the school) were constructed. In 1926, a second floor and gymnasium were added to the 1917 structure. Additions to this structure were also made in 1951, 1956, 1960, 1968, and 1974.

On December 20, 1984, the high school building was destroyed by a fire. All students and staff moved to the Lake Forest West Campus where Warren Township High School existed from January 1985 to June 1987. Students and staff returned to Gurnee in August 1987 after the high school was rebuilt on the same site.

With enrollment continuing to increase, a second campus for Warren Township High School opened in 1997 for juniors and seniors. Called the Almond Campus, it is dependent on the O'Plaine Campus for amenities such as the football field, indoor pool and auditorium.

Two awards were presented to the high school in the 1999-2000 school year with a “Those Who Excel” recognition for creating a learning community throughout the school organization and the national “Blue Ribbon School” recognition from the U.S. Department of Education.

In 2008 a major construction project was partially completed which included a renovation of the Almond Campus lunchroom. A 3 million dollar project that converted the black box theater into a larger seating area for students.

According to Warren's 2008 Report Card, the school failed to meet the minimum requirements for adequate yearly progress for the sixth year in a row. The school's 2008-09 Federal Improvement Status is Restructuring. The school's 2008-09 State Improvement Status is Academic Watch Status Year 3.

Since the 2004-2005 Report Card, Warren has had the status of "Choice". This was intended to allow parents to transfer their children to a school with passing scores.

Since the 2005-2006 Report Card, Warren has had the status of "Supplemental Educational Services" under the federal law. This requires Warren to offer free outside tutoring to economically disadvantaged students.

The first NCLB report card was published in the fall of 2003, the first year of Dr. Sobocinski's superintendency. The district failed to meet the minimum standards of NCLB in 2003, 2004, 2005, 2006, 2007 and 2008. The failure was always the result of failures within subgroups. In the All-Student category, Warren met the AYP standard. In each of the six years, the school district was found to have required all 11th graders to take the state assessment.

In 2025, construction began on the addition of new locker rooms at the O'Plaine Campus. Replacing older ones located in the basement, that were subject to flooding, plumbing issues, and sewage backup. Bids came in at $10,783,466 with a budget of $12,662,834. Construction was completed in late summer 2026.

== District boundary ==
The district includes Gurnee, Gages Lake, and Grandwood Park, as well as most of Old Mill Creek, Park City, and Wadsworth, and parts of Beach Park, Grayslake, Third Lake, and Waukegan. It also covers the community of Wildwood.

== Statistics ==
=== School overview ===
The overall view of the school through the Illinois Interactive Report Card.

Average Teacher Salary	$103,490
Average Teacher Experience	10.9 years
Student Attendance	91%
Students with IEPs	12%
Low Income	34%
Pupil/Teacher ratio	20:1
District Avg Spending per student	$17,000
Expenditures excluded from per-pupil averages	$8,039,219
Total District Expenditures	$72,780,796

== Sports ==
Warren's Blue Devils compete in the North Suburban Conference. The following sports are offered at Warren:

- Football
- Basketball
- Soccer
- Tennis
- Swimming
- Cross country
- Track and field
- Golf
- Lacrosse
- Diving
- Volleyball
- Gymnastics
- Softball
- Baseball
- Bowling
- Wrestling
- Ice hockey
- Water polo
- Badminton
- Marching band

=== Sports Achievements ===
On March 15, 2025, the Varsity Boys Basketball team placed 2nd in the IHSA State Final Tournament, they lost to Benet Academy 54-55.

== Notable alumni ==
- Kevin Anderson, actor
- Nathan Boothe, basketball player
- Will Brooks, MMA fighter
- Mike Caplan, Meteorologist
- Michael M. Crow, Arizona State University president
- Jaxson Davis, basketball player (Attended Senior year at Monarch Academy)
- Brandon Paul, professional basketball player
- Derek Shelton, Major League Baseball, Manager, Minnesota Twins
- J. R. Singleton, NFL nose tackle for the Seattle Seahawks
- William G. Stratton, Governor of Illinois
