= Gages Lake, Illinois =

Gages Lake
- Census-designated place
- Location in Illinois Location in the United States
- Coordinates: 42°21′01″N 88°00′05″W
- Country: United States
- State: Illinois
- County: Lake
- Township: Warren

Area
  - Total: 3.17 sq mi (8.20 km^{2})
  - Land: 2.98 sq mi (7.71 km^{2})
  - Water: 0.19 sq mi (0.49 km^{2})
- Elevation: 771 ft (235 m)

Population (2020)
  - Total: 10,637
  - Density: 3,574.5/sq mi (1,380.14/km^{2})
- Time zone: UTC-6 (CST)
  - Summer (DST): UTC-5 (CDT)
- FIPS code: 17-28248
- GNIS feature ID: 2393015

Gages Lake is a census-designated place (CDP) in Warren Township, Lake County, Illinois, United States. The population was 10,637 at the 2020 census.

== History ==
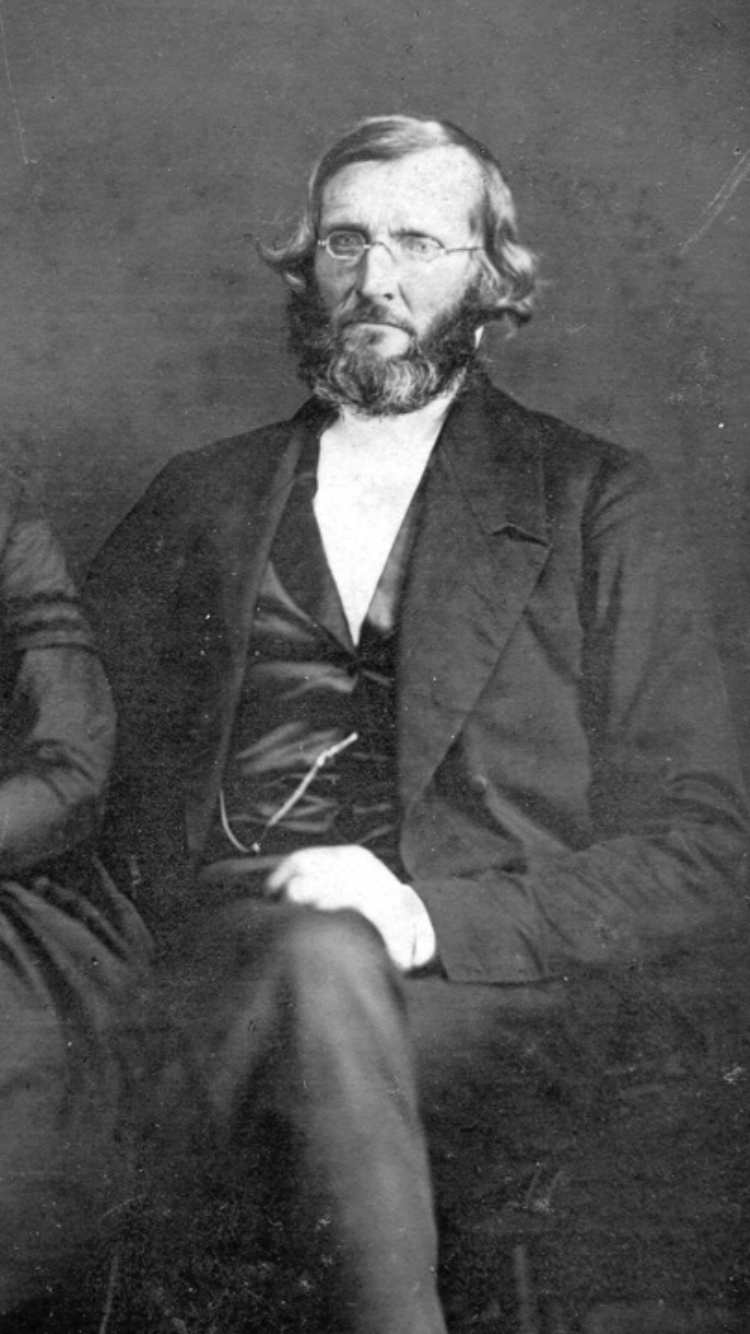
John Gage, 1880

The body of water known as Gages Lake was estimated to have formed nearly 10,000 years ago during the most recent ice age.

In 1838 a schoolhouse was built in the area that would in time become Warren Township High School in 1917. In the 1840s a man known as John Gage and his brother George Gage began sellings parcels of land surrounding the lake which he called the North Grange Resort. Sometime prior to the developments in the 1920s, Richard Warren Sears (no relation to the name of the township) had purchased and owned the lake/surrounding land.

The census-designated place has received fire and police service from the neighboring village of Grayslake since the 1960s.

As part of the Wildwood Park District, in the 1970s the Gages Lake Conservation Committee (GLCC) was formed which still exists to this day.

== Geography ==
The CDP is located in central Lake County in southwestern Warren Township and is bordered to the north and east by the village of Gurnee, to the northwest by the village of Third Lake, and to the west by the village of Grayslake. The water body of Gages Lake is in the western part of the CDP and extends into the village of Third Lake. The CDP includes the communities of Idlewild and Wildwood.

U.S. Route 45 runs along the western edge of the community, leading south 6 miles (10 km) to Mundelein and north 15 miles (24 km) to Bristol, Wisconsin. Illinois Route 120 runs along the southern edge, leading east 8 miles (13 km) to Waukegan and west 4 miles (6 km) to Hainesville. The CDP is 42 miles (68 km) northwest of downtown Chicago.

According to the 2021 census gazetteer files, Gages Lake has a total area of 3.17 square miles (8.21 km^{2}), of which 2.98 square miles (7.72 km^{2}) (or 94.00%) is land and 0.19 square miles (0.49 km^{2}) (or 6.00%) is water.

=== Major streets ===
- Washington Street
- Gages Lake Road
- Hunt Club Road
- Almond Road

== Demographics ==
Historical population
Census	Pop.	Note	%±
1970	5,337		—
1980	3,814		−28.5%
1990	8,349		118.9%
2000	10,415		24.7%
2010	10,198		−2.1%
2020	10,637		4.3%
U.S. Decennial Census; 2010 2020 (Note: Census area returned as Gages Lake-Wildwood in 1970.)

=== Racial and ethnic composition ===
Gages Lake CDP, Illinois – Racial and ethnic composition Note: the US Census treats Hispanic/Latino as an ethnic category. This table excludes Latinos from the racial categories and assigns them to a separate category. Hispanics/Latinos may be of any race.
Race / Ethnicity (NH = Non-Hispanic)	Pop 2000	Pop 2010	Pop 2020	% 2000	% 2010	% 2020
White alone (NH)	9,317	8,121	7,231	89.46%	79.63%	67.98%
Black or African American alone (NH)	206	367	505	1.98%	3.60%	4.75%
Native American or Alaska Native alone (NH)	19	17	27	0.18%	0.17%	0.25%
Asian alone (NH)	323	608	818	3.10%	5.96%	7.69%
Native Hawaiian or Pacific Islander alone (NH)	1	5	6	0.01%	0.05%	0.06%
Other race alone (NH)	7	19	46	0.07%	0.19%	0.43%
Mixed race or Multiracial (NH)	106	189	500	1.02%	1.85%	4.70%
Hispanic or Latino (any race)	436	872	1,504	4.19%	8.55%	14.14%
Total	10,415	10,198	10,637	100.00%	100.00%	100.00%

=== 2020 census ===
As of the 2020 census, Gages Lake had a population of 10,637. The median age was 41.5 years. 21.9% of residents were under the age of 18 and 13.5% of residents were 65 years of age or older. For every 100 females there were 97.6 males, and for every 100 females age 18 and over there were 95.4 males age 18 and over.

100.0% of residents lived in urban areas, while 0.0% lived in rural areas.

There were 4,015 households in Gages Lake, of which 31.8% had children under the age of 18 living in them. Of all households, 57.5% were married-couple households, 15.1% were households with a male householder and no spouse or partner present, and 22.2% were households with a female householder and no spouse or partner present. About 22.4% of all households were made up of individuals and 9.1% had someone living alone who was 65 years of age or older.

There were 4,175 housing units, of which 3.8% were vacant. The homeowner vacancy rate was 1.3% and the rental vacancy rate was 5.3%.

=== Income and poverty ===
The median income for a household in the CDP was $93,837, and the median income for a family was $108,021. Males had a median income of $59,679 versus $41,719 for females. The per capita income for the CDP was $45,673. About 4.5% of families and 6.0% of the population were below the poverty line, including 10.6% of those under age 18 and 2.0% of those age 65 or over.

== Education ==
All areas are in the Woodland Community Consolidated School District 50 and the Warren Township High School District 121.

Warren Township High School Almond Campus (grades 9-10) is in Gages Lake CDP; it has a Gurnee postal address.

== See also ==
- List of census-designated places in Illinois
