= Millburn Community Consolidated School District 24 =

School district in Illinois, United States

Address
- 18550 Millburn Road Wadsworth, Illinois, 60083; United States

District information
- Grades: PreK-8
- Superintendent: Dr. Jason Lind

Other information
- Website: Official website

Millburn Community Consolidated School District 24 is a Lake County, Illinois school district that covers parts of Lindenhurst, Old Mill Creek and Wadsworth. As of 2021, the superintendent is Dr. Jason Lind.
