= Newport Library =

Newport Library may refer to:

- Newport Central Library, city of Newport, South Wales, United Kingdom
- Newport Public Library, Newport, Rhode Island, United States
- Newport News Public Library, Newport News, Virginia, United States
- Warren-Newport Public Library District, Lake County, Illinois, United States
