= Mother Rudd House =

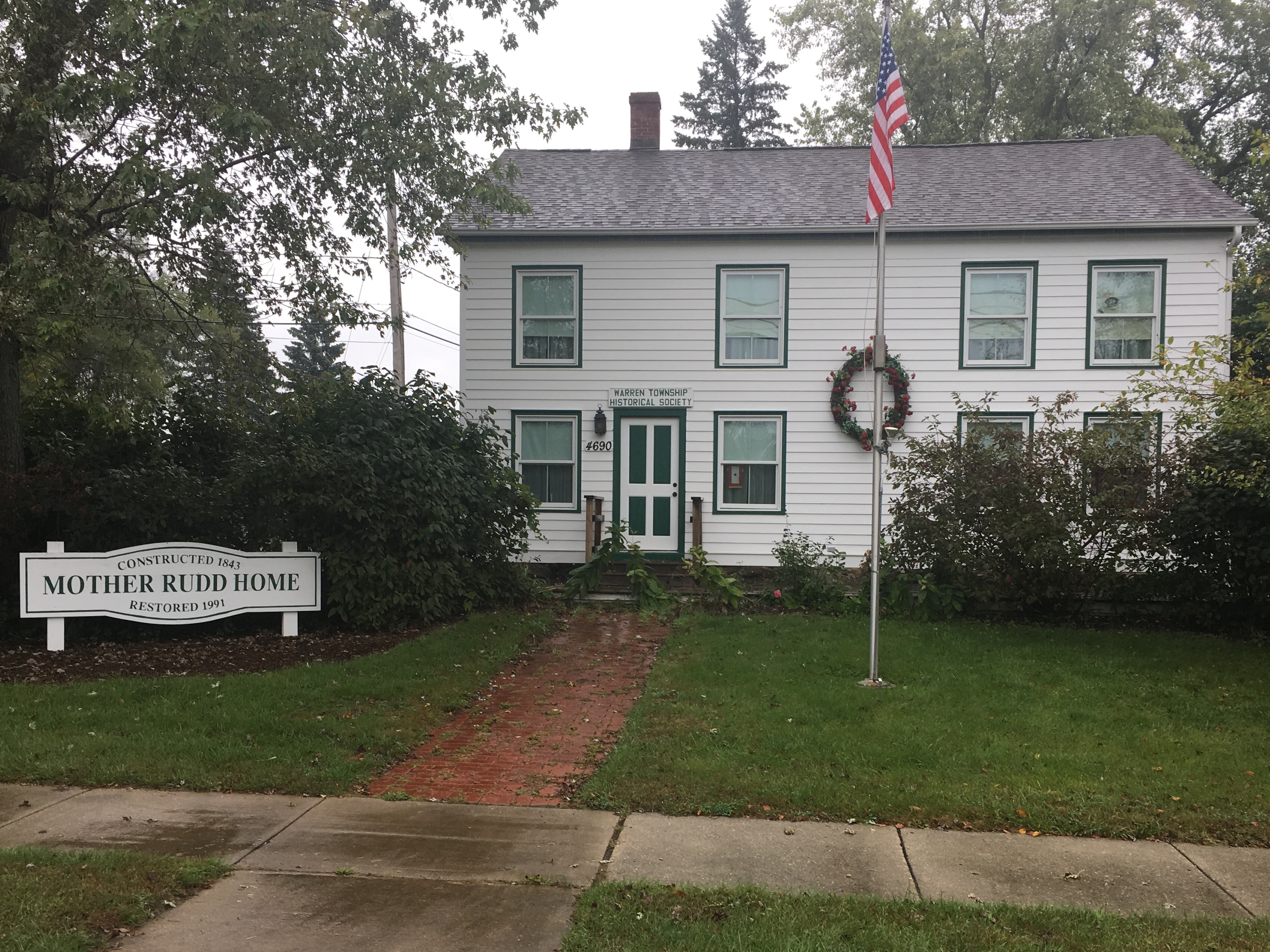
- Mother Rudd House in 2018
- Interactive map of the Mother Rudd House area

General information
- Architectural style: Georgian
- Location: 4690 Old Grand Ave, Gurnee, Illinois
- Coordinates: 42°22′20″N 87°55′09″W
- Construction started: 1843
- Completed: 1844
- Renovated: 1991

The Mother Rudd House is a historic home in Gurnee, Illinois. It is the oldest building in Warren Township and one of the oldest in both Lake County and the state. Completed in 1844, the building serves as the headquarters of the Warren Township Historical Society.

== History ==
Prior to the construction of the home, an adjacent inn was built in 1841 that is now lost. The two-story home began construction in 1843 as a stage coach stop for travelers coming and going from the settlement of "Little Fort". Now known as Waukegan. Originally named the O'Plain House, the land was purchased by Wealthy Buell (b. 1793 in Lebanon, Connecticut) and Jonathan Harvey, where they would open their temperance tavern that same year. Only four years after the establishment of Lake County. After Jonathan died in January 1845, Wealthy married Erastus Rudd in 1846. When Warren Township was formed in 1850 the building served as a local town hall, post office, and general store. Being the most popular gathering spot in town, Wealthy over time became known as "Mother Rudd." Erastus passed away in 1870.

The Rudd's were known as strong Union supporters. Before, during, and after the Civil War, it is said that the Mother Rudd Barn (located behind the house) served as a stop for escaped slaves traveling along the Underground Railroad as well as horses for stagecoaches. Its location was optimal as it is only 100 feet from the Des Plaines River. Following heavy winds in the 1970's, the barn's roof was damaged resulting in the rest of the structure being dismantled soon after. Leaving just the stone foundation. Mother Rudd died on August 8, 1880 at the age of 87. She was buried in Warren Cemetery two miles west of the home. She was the mother of thirteen children. Her daughter Nancy continued to run the inn until 1894. The property was then sold to the McCann family who would run a candy shop out of the home.

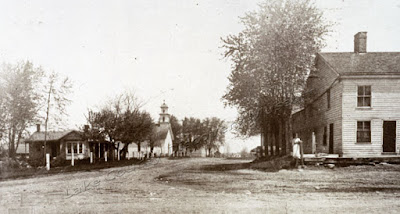
Corner of (modern) Kilbourne and Old Grand Ave, Mother Rudd House (right) c.1910

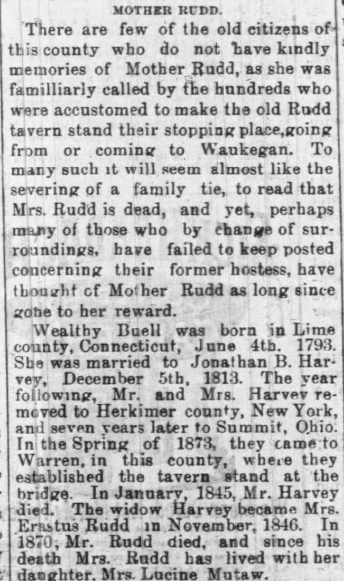
Wealthy's obituary in The Waukegan Weekly Gazette Aug 14, 1880.

The Warren Township Historical Society was established in 1975. After multiple owners would come and go, the three acre property was purchased by the village of Gurnee in 1984 and underwent a large renovation that was completed in 1991. Exactly 150 years after the original inn was first built. As of 2018, the WTHS has ownership of 27,000 local artifacts.
