= Rosecrans, Illinois =

- Unincorporated place
- Location within Illinois Location within the United States
- Coordinates: 42°27′55″N 87°57′09″W
- Country: United States
- State: Illinois
- County: Lake
- Township: Newport
- Named for: William Starke Rosecrans
- Elevation: 719 ft (219 m)
- GNIS feature id: 416952

Rosecrans is an unincorporated community along Rosecrans Road (Illinois Route 173) just west of U.S. Route 41 in northern Lake County, Illinois, 2.0 miles (3.2 km) south of the Wisconsin state line and 7.8 miles (12.6 km) west of Lake Michigan. The community is named for American Civil War General William Starke Rosecrans. The business district is at the intersection of IL 173 and US 41, east of the residential community.
