= Waukegan Township, Illinois =

Waukegan Township
- Township
- Location in Lake County

- Lake County's location in Illinois
- Coordinates: 42°22′23″N 87°51′01″W
- Country: United States
- State: Illinois
- County: Lake
- Established: November 6, 1849

Government
  - Supervisor: Patricia Jones

Area
  - Total: 21.53 sq mi (55.8 km^{2})
  - Land: 21.14 sq mi (54.8 km^{2})
  - Water: 0.39 sq mi (1.0 km^{2}) 1.81%
- Elevation: 650 ft (198 m)

Population (2020)
  - Total: 90,386
  - Density: 4,276/sq mi (1,651/km^{2})
- Time zone: UTC-6 (CST)
  - Summer (DST): UTC-5 (CDT)
- FIPS code: 17-097-79306
- Website: www.waukegantownship.com

Waukegan Township is a township in Lake County, Illinois, USA. As of the 2020 census, its population was 90,386.

== Geography ==
According to the 2021 census gazetteer files, Waukegan Township has a total area of 21.53 square miles (55.76 km^{2}), of which 21.14 square miles (54.75 km^{2}) (or 98.19%) is land and 0.39 square miles (1.01 km^{2}) (or 1.81%) is water. Lakes in this township include Dead Lake. Sunderland Creek and the Waukegan River run through this township.

=== Cities and towns ===
- Beach Park (north quarter)
- North Chicago (south quarter)
- Park City (west quarter)
- Waukegan (partial)

=== Adjacent townships ===
- Benton Township (north)
- Shields Township (south)
- Libertyville Township (southwest)
- Warren Township (west)
- Newport Township (northwest)

=== Cemeteries ===
The township contains five cemeteries: Am Echod Jewish, North Shore Garden of Memories, Oakwood, Pahlman Family and Saint Marys.

=== Major highways ===
- U.S. Route 41
- Illinois Route 120
- Illinois Route 131
- Illinois Route 132
- Illinois Route 137

=== Airports and landing strips ===
- Waukegan Regional Airport
- Saint Therese Medical Center Heliport
- Victory Memorial Hospital Off Heliport

== Demographics ==
As of the 2020 census there were 90,386 people, 29,825 households, and 20,281 families residing in the township. The population density was 4,198.34 inhabitants per square mile (1,620.99/km^{2}). There were 31,955 housing units at an average density of 1,484.28 per square mile (573.08/km^{2}). The racial makeup of the township was 20.82% White, 18.28% African American, 2.81% Native American, 2.66% Asian, 0.07% Pacific Islander, 37.69% from other races, and 17.66% from two or more races. Hispanic or Latino of any race were 63.71% of the population.

There were 29,825 households, out of which 41.10% had children under the age of 18 living with them, 42.02% were married couples living together, 18.98% had a female householder with no spouse present, and 32.00% were non-families. 26.40% of all households were made up of individuals, and 10.00% had someone living alone who was 65 years of age or older. The average household size was 2.89 and the average family size was 3.56.

The township's age distribution consisted of 27.7% under the age of 18, 11.8% from 18 to 24, 27.7% from 25 to 44, 22.2% from 45 to 64, and 10.6% who were 65 years of age or older. The median age was 32.3 years. For every 100 females, there were 98.1 males. For every 100 females age 18 and over, there were 98.1 males.

The median income for a household in the township was $48,245, and the median income for a family was $58,325. Males had a median income of $31,604 versus $25,048 for females. The per capita income for the township was $20,743. About 14.1% of families and 17.1% of the population were below the poverty line, including 26.5% of those under age 18 and 8.8% of those age 65 or over.

Historical population
Census	Pop.	Note	%±
2000	92,693		—
2010	90,893		−1.9%
2020	90,386		−0.6%
U.S. Decennial Census
