= Gurnee, Illinois =

- Village
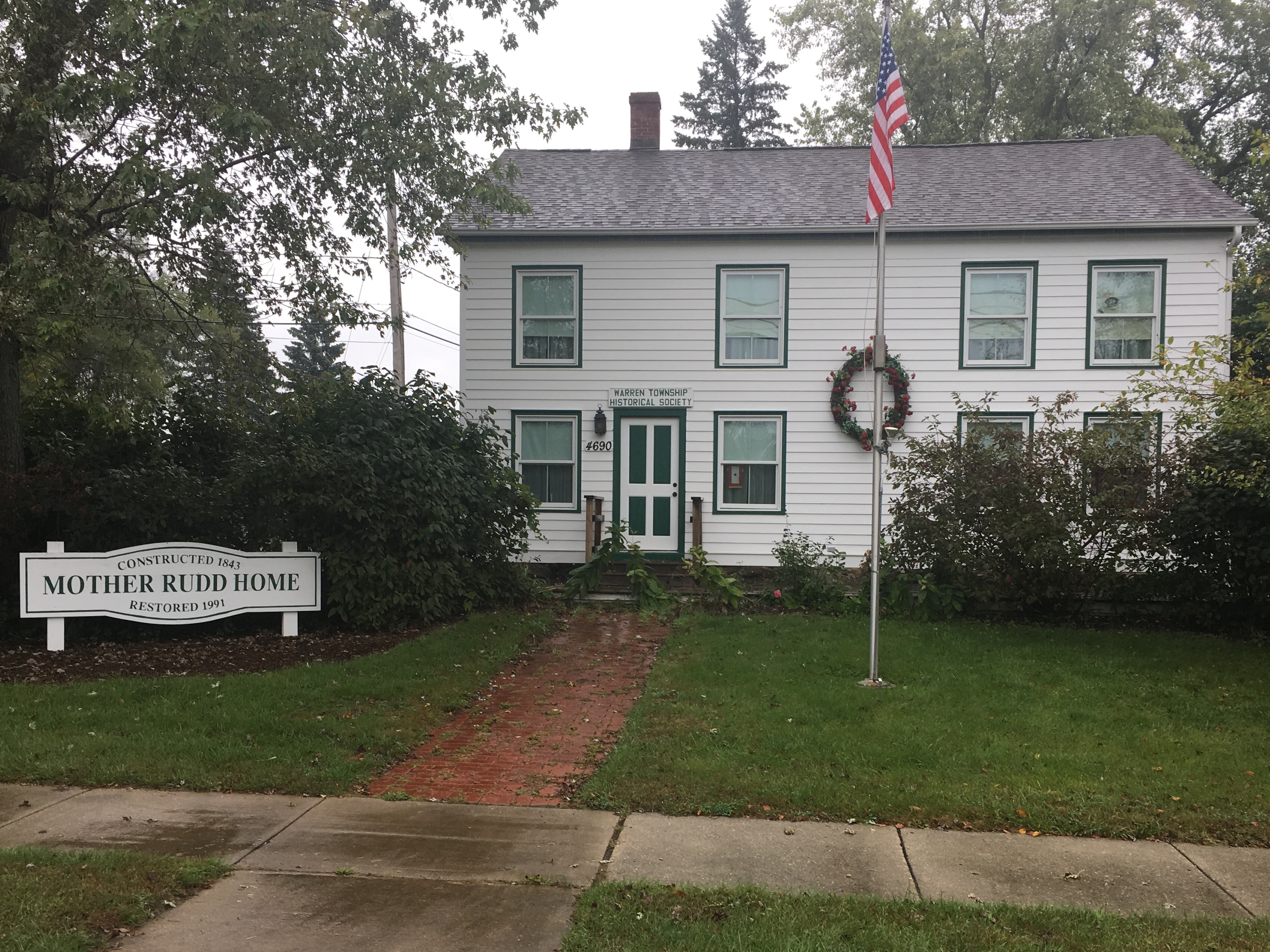
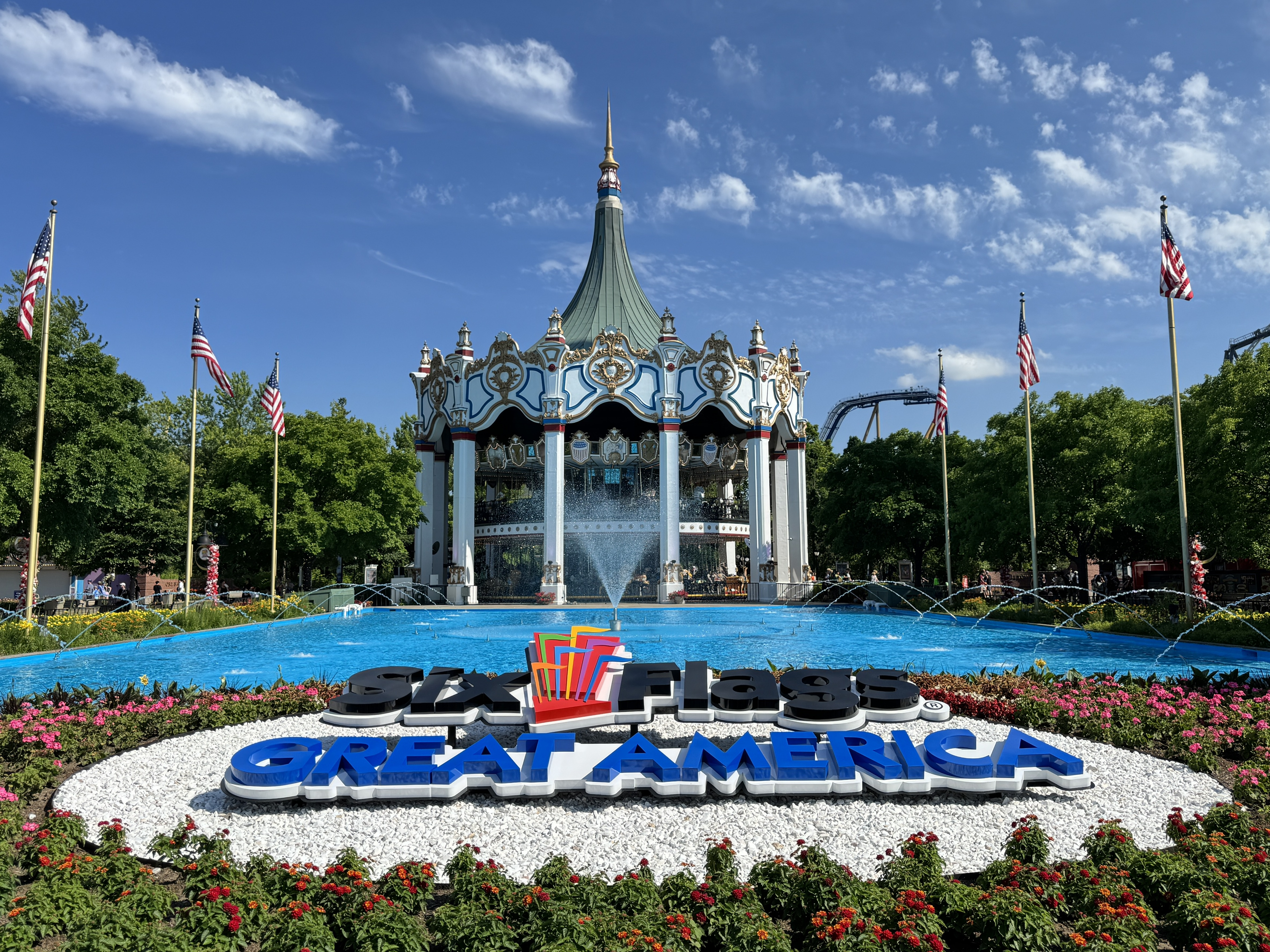
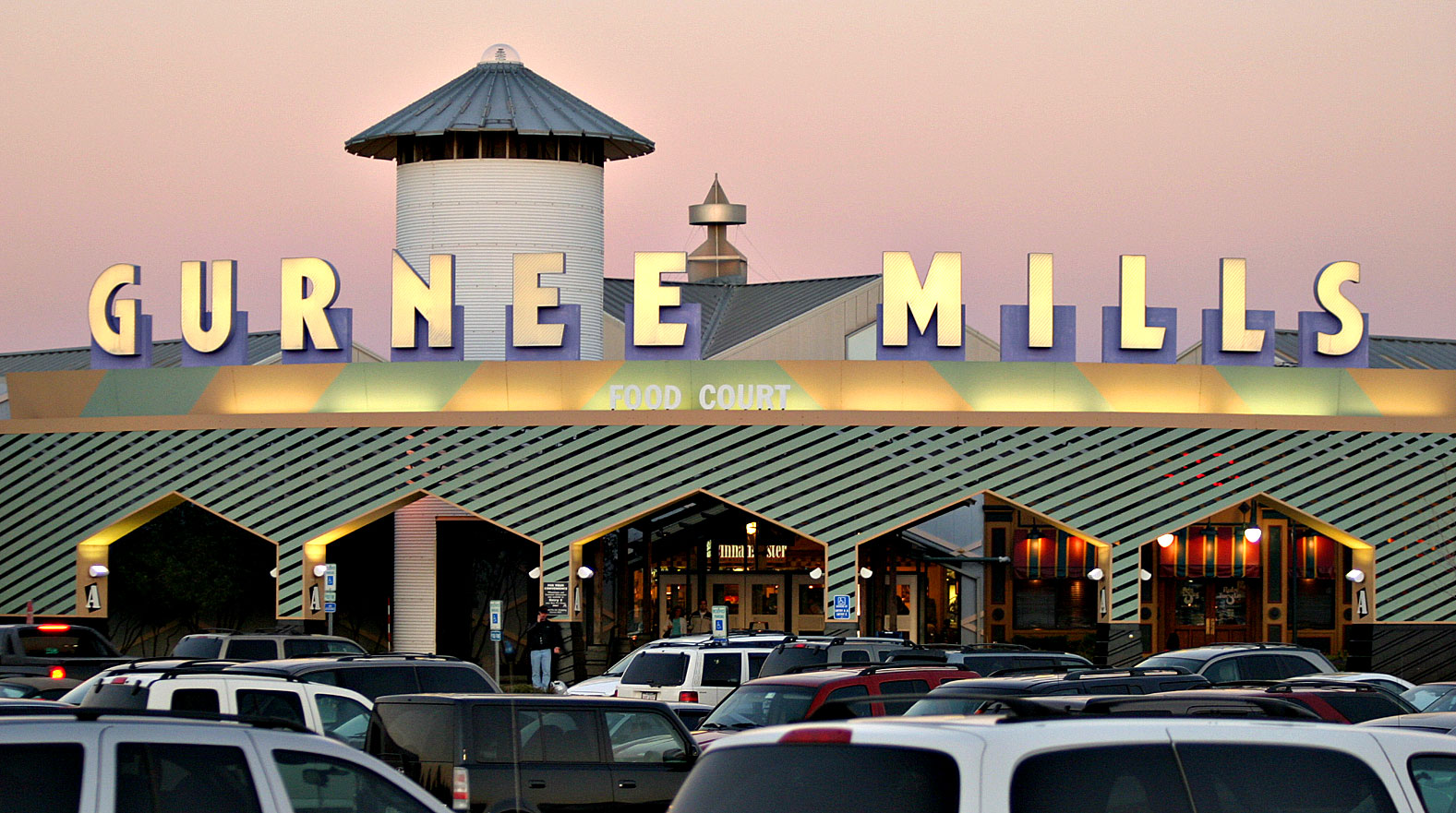
- Mother Rudd House Six Flags Great America Gurnee Mills

- Logo
- Motto: "Community of Opportunity"
- Location of Gurnee in Lake County, Illinois.
- Coordinates: 42°22′40″N 87°58′20″W
- Country: United States
- State: Illinois
- County: Lake
- Founded: 1928
- Named for: Walter S. Gurnee

Area
  - Total: 13.58 sq mi (35.18 km^{2})
  - Land: 13.51 sq mi (34.99 km^{2})
  - Water: 0.077 sq mi (0.20 km^{2})
- Elevation: 715 ft (218 m)

Population (2020)
  - Total: 30,706
  - Density: 2,273.0/sq mi (877.62/km^{2})
- Time zone: UTC−6 (CST)
  - Summer (DST): UTC−5 (CDT)
- ZIP code: 60031
- Area codes: 224, 847
- FIPS code: 17-32018
- GNIS feature ID: 2398219
- Website: gurneeil.gov

Gurnee (/ɡərˈniː/ ghər-NEE) is a village in Lake County, in the U.S. state of Illinois. As of the 2020 census, its population was 30,706. Located in the Chicago metropolitan area, it borders the city of Waukegan. It is roughly 40 miles (64 km) north of Chicago and 50 miles (80 km) south of Milwaukee. The village was founded in 1928 and is named after former Chicago mayor Walter S. Gurnee.

The village is a major regional tourist attraction, home to the Six Flags Great America and Hurricane Harbor Chicago amusement park and water park complex, the Gurnee Mills shopping mall, and the Great Wolf Lodge resort. Attracting more than 23 million visitors annually, Gurnee is accessible via Interstate 94 which runs directly through the village. Gurnee is home to the corporate headquarters of High Sierra Sport Company.

== History ==
Early settlers in the Gurnee area came by foot horseback and by "Prairie Schooners" drawn by oxen or via the Erie Canal and the Great Lakes. They came from the town of Warren, New York, which was named in honor of Major General Joseph Warren, killed at the Battle of Bunker Hill. Warren Township, formed in 1850, was also named after him. The first settlement of Warren Township commenced in 1835 in the vicinity of the Aux Plaines River (now the Des Plaines River).

In 1835–36, a land company from New York State erected a Community House (site of the old Gurnee Grade School) to accommodate families while they were locating and getting government land grants to their farms. Near the Community House, there was a ford used by the Potowatomi Indians for crossing the river. A floating log bridge was built in 1842. Later, both a wood and iron bridge were built.

With the erection of a permanent bridge, roads were established, and this area became the hub of the township. It was at this junction that the Milwaukee Road crossed the river from west to east, and then continued north to eventually connect Chicago to Milwaukee. This road was "laid out" in 1836 by three early settlers: Thomas McClure, Mark Noble, and Richard Steele. The east–west road, now known as Grand Avenue, was a main route from McHenry County to the port of Waukegan. Stage coaches ran on this route as late as 1870.

The hamlet was originally called "Wentworth", after Congressman "Long John" Wentworth, who also served as the Republican Mayor of Chicago between 1857 and 1863. Thereafter, Walter S. Gurnee, the 14th Mayor of Chicago and one of the directors of the railroad, agreed to develop a station in Wentworth, which was called "Gurnee Station" in his honor. Over time, Gurnee Station became known simply as "Gurnee" and was incorporated as such.

Just east of the bridge, at the junction of Milwaukee Road and Grand Avenue, was the Mutaw Tavern, earlier known as "Marm Rudd's Tavern" and more recently as the Mother Rudd House. This was a stage coach stop between Chicago and Milwaukee and was a stopover for farmers from the west traveling to Little Fort (now known as Waukegan) to barter their crops for supplies and to ship out from the ports. It also served as a stop during the Underground Railroad. This building was acquired by the Village of Gurnee in 1984, has been restored, and now houses the Warren Township Historical Society.

In May 2004, Gurnee received major rainfall, causing the worst flooding in 100 years. The flood forced several schools to close and caused building damage to dozens of homes and businesses.

== Geography ==
According to the 2021 census gazetteer files, Gurnee has a total area of 13.59 square miles (35.20 km^{2}), of which 13.51 square miles (34.99 km^{2}) (or 99.44%) is land and 0.08 square miles (0.21 km^{2}) (or 0.56%) is water. It is located on the banks of the Des Plaines River and is split by Interstate 94, which divides the village into east (old) and west (new) sides.

== Demographics ==
Historical population
Census	Pop.	Note	%±
1930	503		—
1940	661		31.4%
1950	1,097		66.0%
1960	1,831		66.9%
1970	2,738		49.5%
1980	7,179		162.2%
1990	13,701		90.8%
2000	28,834		110.5%
2010	31,295		8.5%
2020	30,706		−1.9%
U.S. Decennial Census; 2010 2020

=== Racial and ethnic composition ===
Gurnee village, Illinois – Racial and ethnic composition Note: the US Census treats Hispanic/Latino as an ethnic category. This table excludes Latinos from the racial categories and assigns them to a separate category. Hispanics/Latinos may be of any race.
Race / Ethnicity (NH = Non-Hispanic)	Pop 2000	Pop 2010	Pop 2020	% 2000	% 2010	% 2020
White alone (NH)	22,705	20,872	17,463	78.74%	66.69%	56.87%
Black or African American alone (NH)	1,442	2,362	2,643	5.00%	7.55%	8.61%
Native American or Alaska Native alone (NH)	39	57	40	0.14%	0.18%	0.13%
Asian alone (NH)	2,345	3,601	3,743	8.13%	11.51%	12.19%
Native Hawaiian or Pacific Islander alone (NH)	9	14	22	0.03%	0.04%	0.07%
Other race alone (NH)	54	52	189	0.19%	0.17%	0.62%
Mixed race or Multiracial (NH)	502	672	1,166	1.74%	2.15%	3.80%
Hispanic or Latino (any race)	1,738	3,665	5,440	6.03%	11.71%	17.72%
Total	28,834	31,295	30,706	100.00%	100.00%	100.00%

=== 2020 census ===
As of the 2020 census, Gurnee had a population of 30,706, with 11,900 households and 8,080 families.

There were 12,386 housing units, of which 3.9% were vacant. The homeowner vacancy rate was 1.2% and the rental vacancy rate was 5.3%. The population density was 2,260.29 inhabitants per square mile (872.70/km^{2}), and there were 911.74 per square mile (352.02/km^{2}) housing units.

The median age was 41.8 years. 21.7% of residents were under the age of 18 and 15.3% of residents were 65 years of age or older. For every 100 females, there were 91.3 males, and for every 100 females age 18 and over there were 88.1 males age 18 and over.

31.6% of households had children under the age of 18 living in them. Of all households, 53.5% were married-couple households, 14.3% were households with a male householder and no spouse or partner present, and 27.2% were households with a female householder and no spouse or partner present. About 27.0% of all households were made up of individuals and 11.2% had someone living alone who was 65 years of age or older. The average household size was 3.25 and the average family size was 2.67.

99.3% of residents lived in urban areas, while 0.7% lived in rural areas.

=== Income and poverty ===
The median income for a household in the village was $100,892, and the median income for a family was $129,858. Males had a median income of $70,322 versus $44,004 for females. The per capita income for the village was $47,800. About 3.1% of families and 4.8% of the population were below the poverty line, including 4.6% of those under age 18 and 4.0% of those age 65 or over.

== Economy ==
Gurnee hosts the headquarters of the sports apparel company High Sierra Sport Company, a subsidiary of Samsonite, and PurposeBuilt Brands, the owner of the Goo Gone adhesive remover.

=== Tourism ===
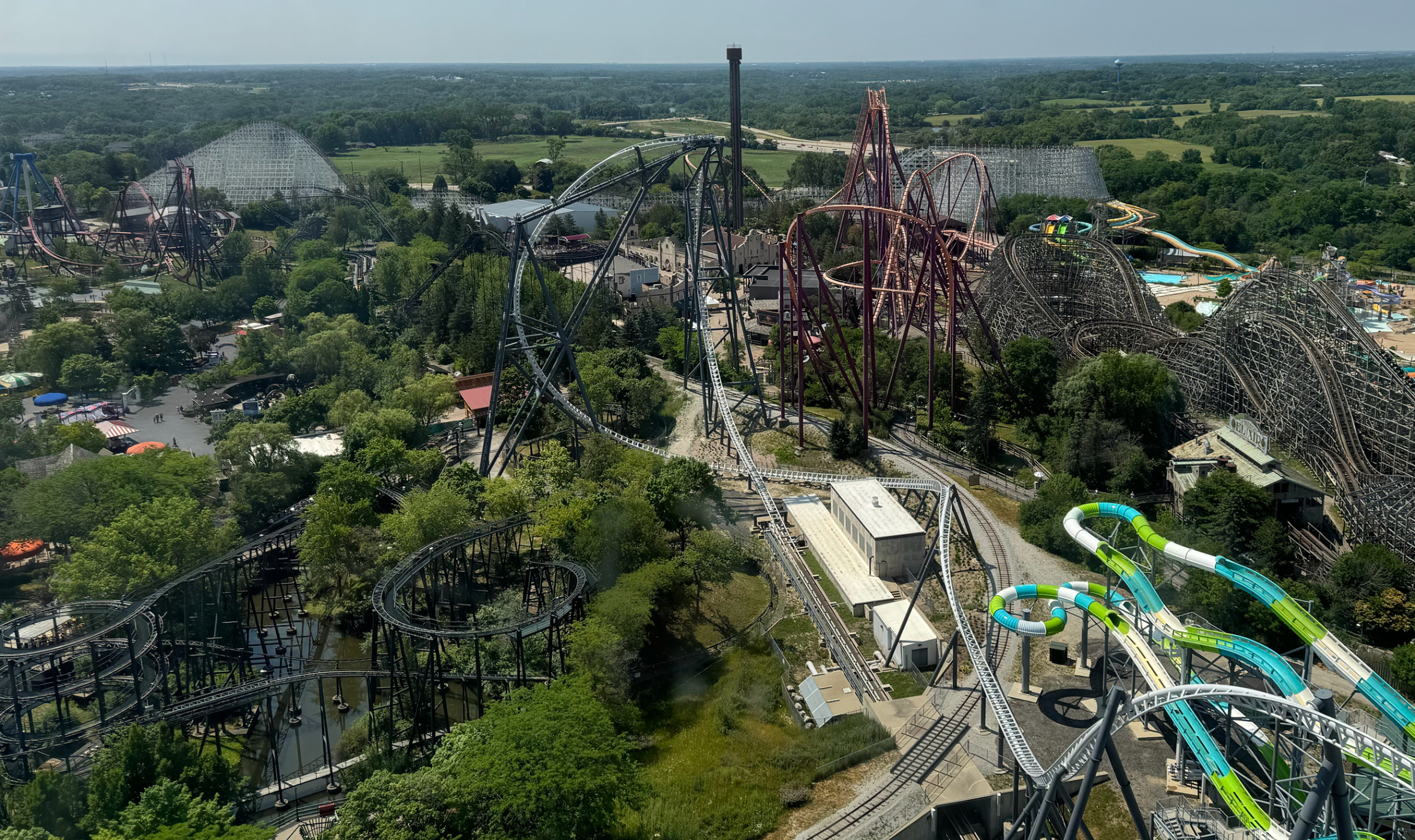
Six Flags Great America transformed Gurnee into a regional tourist attraction following its 1976 opening.

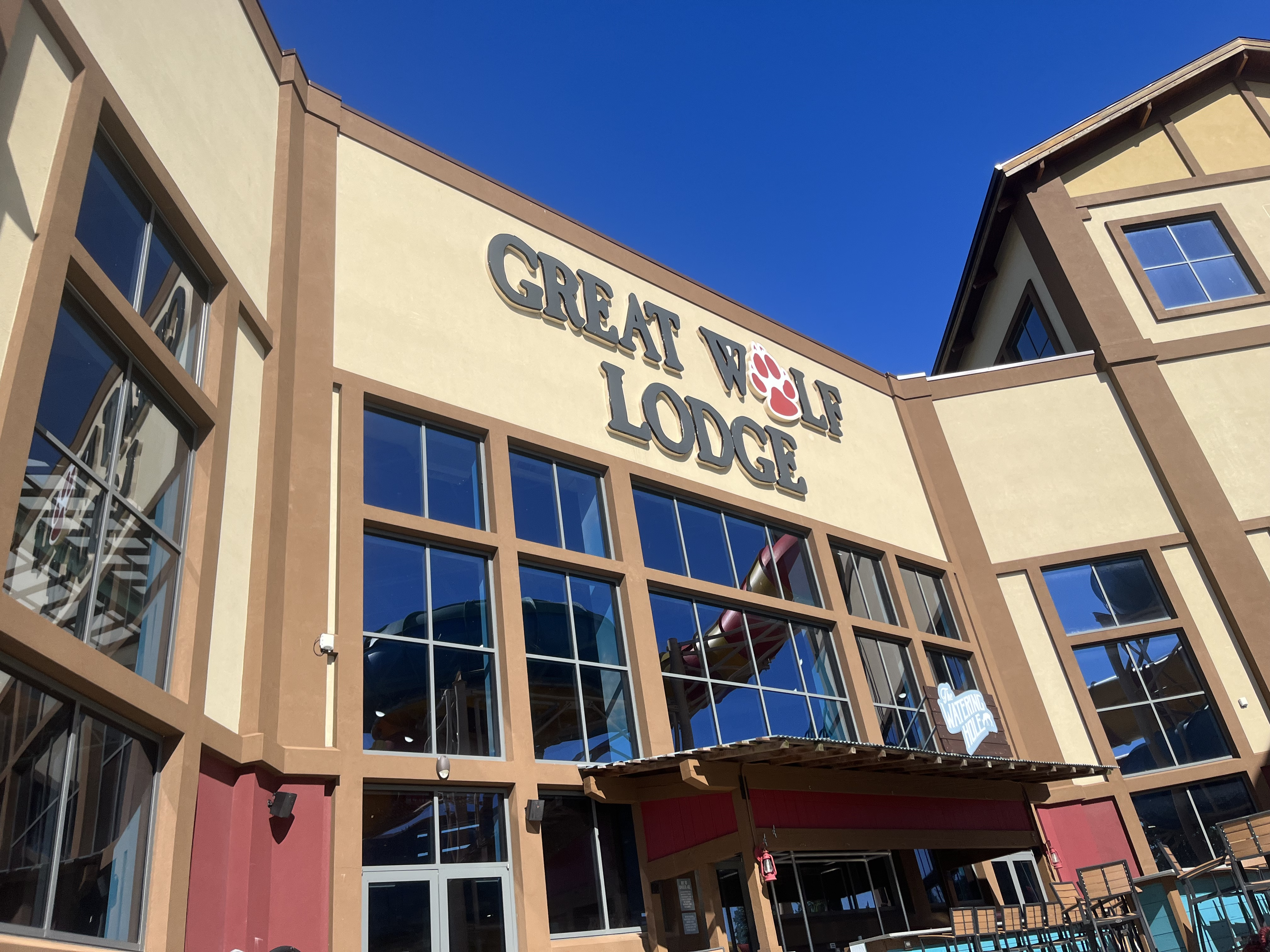
Great Wolf Lodge, an resort with an indoor water park, opened in 2007 as Key Lime Cove

Gurnee has a tourism industry anchored by the Six Flags Great America and Hurricane Harbor Chicago amusement–water park complex, the Gurnee Mills mall and Great Wolf Lodge resort, in addition to other shopping and lodging. The village attracts around 23 million visitors annually.

The amusement park Six Flags Great America and its water park Six Flags Hurricane Harbor Chicago are both major tourist attractions in Gurnee. The amusement park originally opened in 1976 as Marriott's Great America, while the water park opened in 2005. 3 million visitors attended Great America in 2023, ranking it among the top 20 most visited amusement parks in North America. The parks have helped transform Gurnee from a rural town into a regional tourist attraction and are one of the largest revenue sources for the village.

Gurnee Mills has attracted between 15 million to 20 million visitors per year since its opening in 1991. The mall was advertised as the "world's largest outlet mall" upon its opening, and is the fourth largest mall in Illinois. The 30-acre (12 ha) Great Wolf Lodge is a major hotel resort and has an indoor waterpark, originally opening in 2007 as Key Lime Cove. It was sold to Great Wolf Resorts in 2017.

=== Top employers ===
Gurnee no longer reports employer numbers as of 2025 for privacy reasons. According to Gurnee's 2021 Comprehensive Annual Financial Report, the top employers in the village were:

#	Employer	# of Employees
1	Six Flags Great America; Hurricane Harbor Chicago	3,315
2	Woodland School District 50	832
3	Warren Township High School	484
4	Nosco Inc.	400
5	Gurnee School District No. 56	390
6	Great Wolf Lodge	356
7	Bass Pro Shops	350
8	Gurnee Park District	330
9	Village of Gurnee (full-time equivalent)	233

== Arts and culture ==
=== Library ===
The Gurnee Public Library is located at 224 N. O'Plaine Road. The Warren-Newport Public Library offers a collection of over 270,000 books, hundreds of magazines, and over 37,000 CDs and DVDs, as well as programming for all ages designed to provide personal enrichment, education and entertainment. The library serves a population of 60,000 residents.

The Warren-Newport Public Library District began in 1971, when the Gurnee Women's Club began to look for a meaningful service which their club could offer the area. Opening day for the library came on January 10, 1973. The library opened its doors for 45 hours per week with 3,000 volumes. The library moved into its current location in 1978. In 1997, the library opened a $5.6 million (~$10.1 million in 2024), 31,000-square-foot (2,900 m^{2}) addition. In the fall of 2010, an $8.5 million (~$11.9 million in 2024) construction project began, adding 4,500 square feet and renovating 28,000 square feet of the oldest parts of the building.

Lake County, Illinois communities that fall completely within the boundaries of the district are Gurnee, Illinois; Grandwood Park, Illinois; Park City, Illinois; and Wildwood, Illinois. Partially included in the district are the communities of Beach Park, Illinois; Grayslake, Illinois; Lake Villa, Illinois; Old Mill Creek, Illinois; Third Lake, Illinois; Wadsworth, Illinois; Waukegan, Illinois; and Millburn, Illinois.

In 2004, the library was one of the early adopters of passive RFID (radio frequency identification) technology for the automation of item check-in (News Sun, September 28, 2004).

According to statistics gathered by the Library Research Center at the University of Illinois, the Warren-Newport Public Library is the second busiest library in Lake County, after the Cook Memorial Library in Libertyville. (News Sun, October 3, 2006).

According to its mission statement, the Warren Newport Public Library "provides the community with access to information, kindles the imagination of children and adults, and supports lifelong learning."

== Government ==
The village of Gurnee is a home rule municipality which functions under the council-manager form of government with a Village President and a six-member Board of Trustees, all of whom are elected to four-year terms. The Village President and three of the Trustees are elected every four years. The other group of three Trustees are also elected for four-year terms, but this election is staggered and takes place two years after the first group. As of 2025, the mayor is Thomas B. Hood.

== Education ==
The majority of the eastern half of the village is served by Gurnee School District #56. Four schools make up District #56. They are:

- River Trail School (grades K-8)
- Prairie Trail School (grades 3–5)
- Spaulding School (grades PK-2)
- Viking Middle School (grades 6–8)

The western section of Gurnee, along with portions of the village's east side is served by Woodland Community Consolidated School District 50. Woodland comprises:

- Woodland Middle School (grades 6–8)
- Woodland Intermediate School (grades 4–5)
- Woodland Elementary School (grades 1–3)
- Woodland Primary School (K)

The village is served by Warren Township High School District 121. This district operates Warren Township High School, which is made up of the O'Plaine Road Campus (freshmen and sophomores) and the Almond Road Campus (juniors and seniors).

There is a charter school, Prairie Crossing Charter School, which has grades K-8. It admits students from areas within school districts 50 and 79. It is not a Woodland District 50 school.)

== Infrastructure ==
=== Transportation ===
Interstate 94 (The Tri-State Tollway) is the main expressway servicing Gurnee, allowing easy access to Milwaukee and Chicago.

Pace provides bus service on multiple routes connecting Gurnee to downtown Waukegan, Grayslake and other destinations.

The CPKC main line between Chicago and Minneapolis serves Gurnee.

=== Drinking water supply ===
Gurnee's water supply comes from Lake Michigan, and is distributed by the Central Lake County Joint Action Water Agency located in Lake Bluff, Illinois.

== Notable people ==
- Kevin Anderson, actor
- Larry Farmer, basketball coach
- Max Floriani, soccer player
- Robbie Gould, football player
- Tommie Harris, football player
- Tank Johnson, football player
- Allen James Lynch, United States Army recipient of the Medal of Honor for heroic actions during the Vietnam War
- Muhsin Muhammad, football player
- Brandon Paul, basketball player
- Greg Rallo, hockey player
- Mitchell Trubisky, football player
- Tim Weigel, Chicago television broadcaster
