= Grandwood Lake =

Lake in Illinois, United States

- Location within Illinois Location within the United States
- Location: Grandwood Park
- Coordinates: 42°23′25″N 87°59′35″W
- Type: Man-made (technically, a reservoir)
- Basin countries: United States
- Surface area: 12 acres (4.9 ha)
- Average depth: 5 ft (1.5 m)
- Max. depth: 6.7 ft (2.0 m)
- Shore length^{1}: 0.8 mi (1.3 km)
- ^{1} Shore length is not a well-defined measure.

Grandwood Lake is a small man-made lake in Lake County, Illinois. It is located within the census-designated place of Grandwood Park, near the intersection of Illinois Route 132 and U.S. Route 45. It is home to many different species of fish, birds, reptiles, and amphibians. Mill Creek, a tributary of the Des Plaines River, flows through the lake.

== History ==
In 1941 an unnamed farmer built a small timber dam that barred Mill Creek. This subsequently resulted in the formation of the lake that same year.

After the Des Plaines River Flood of 2017 the then-76-year-old dam was in dire straits. Large floods began to consume the adjoining parks and residences every spring and summer even prior to the flood. By 2019 the Grandwood Park Park District, which owns the lake, got around to draining the lake and constructing a new concrete and steel dam. The delay was largely impacted by a lack of funding. Despite the final cost being unknown, it was originally estimated to be between $900,000 and $1.7 million.

== Etymology ==
Despite being referred to as a lake, due to the small size of the body of water, many of the residents consider it a pond. However, there is no official criteria that distinguishes one from the other. A pond typically is a small, still body of water. Since Mill Creek flows through the lake, this is likely why the Lake County Government and Google Maps label it as such. In addition to being recognized as a lake by the Illinois Department of Natural Resources.

== Species ==
- Largemouth bass
- Walleye
- Northern pike
- Bluegill
- Warmouth
- Carp
- Yellow bullhead
- Yellow perch
- Pumpkinseed
- Western painted turtle
- Common snapping turtle
- Bull-frog
- Leopard frog
- American toad
