= Russell, Illinois =

- Unincorporated community
- Location within Illinois Location within the United States
- Coordinates: 42°29′26″N 87°54′45″W
- Country: United States
- State: Illinois
- County: Lake
- Township: Newport
- Elevation: 696 ft (212 m)
- Time zone: UTC-6 (Central (CST))
  - Summer (DST): UTC-5 (CDT)
- ZIP code: 60075
- Area codes: 847 & 224
- GNIS feature ID: 417059

Russell is an unincorporated community in Lake County, Illinois, United States. The community is located on Russell Road, a few miles east of Interstate 94 (also the terminus of Interstate 41), and was named for industrialist and political figure Russell Sage, who was connected with the Chicago, Milwaukee, St. Paul and Pacific Railroad (Milwaukee Road, later Soo Line Railroad and now, Canadian Pacific) which bisects the village. Russell is near the Wisconsin state line 5 miles (8.0 km) west of Winthrop Harbor. Russell has a post office with ZIP code 60075.
