= High Sierra Sport Company =

American sports apparel company

- Formerly: H. Bernbaum Import & Export Company
- Type: Private
- Industry: Accessories; Apparel
- Founded: December 1978; 47 years ago (as H. Bernbaum Import & Export Company) in Vernon Hills, Illinois, U.S.
- Founder: Harry and Hank Bernbaum
- Headquarters: Gurnee, Illinois, U.S.
- Area served: Worldwide
- Products: Outdoor gear, adventure travel gear, hiking gear, luggage, hydration packs, active wear, outdoor apparel, children's backpacks, and framepacks
- Owner: Samsonite

High Sierra Sport Company is an American sports apparel company that manufactures for a global market active-outdoor and sports bags, mainly soft-sided backpacks, wheeled luggage, duffels as well as leather travel bags and day packs. Founded in 1978 in Vernon Hills, Illinois as H. Bernbaum Import & Export Company by Harry Bernbaum and his son Hank, it was acquired by Samsonite on July 31, 2012, for $110 million in cash. The subsidiary employs 51-200 people and is headquartered in Gurnee, Illinois.

== History ==
Founded in 1978 by Harry Bernbaum, a lover of the outdoors, High Sierra Sport Company was named after High Sierra, the 1941 Humphrey Bogart-starring film, as well as the Sierra Nevada mountains, both of which inspired the aesthetic of High Sierra, the company's eponymous brand and line of bags, as Bernbaum intended his manufacturing company's bag and luggage products to appeal to both the adventurous outdoorsman and the adventure-seeking sort of ordinary traveler. As for the line of soft-leather bags and luggage that he also envisioned to be a part of his brand, Bernbaum outsourced its manufacture to companies in Korea and China through his son Hank, one of the first American companies to do so.

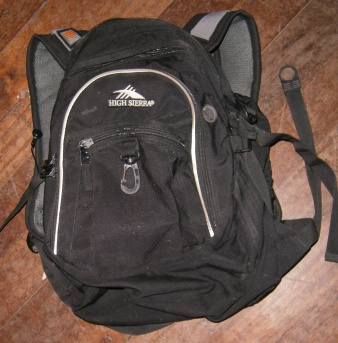
A High Sierra backpack.

Throughout the 1980s and 1990s, the brand would add camping and hiking gear to its line, including tents, coolers, and weather-repellent sleeping bags, to compete with other brands like Patagonia and The North Face. In the early 1980s the High Sierra canvas bag with leather trim became a bestseller of the brand, particularly among its preppy college students market. But the brand's biggest success through the decades has been its innovative, feature-laden backpacks for various sports and activities, including for hiking and biking, wheeled soft-sided bags, and short-trip daypacks.

In May 2012, the company moved to Gurnee, Illinois.

=== Acquisition ===
In 2012, Samsonite offered to buy High Sierra for $110 million in cash. The acquisition was formalized on July 31, 2012.

== Sponsorship ==
High Sierra has served as an official sponsor and supplier of the U.S. Ski Team as well as the U.S. Snowboarding Team, providing them with sport-specific bags and gear.
