= Gurnee School District 56 =

School district in Illinois, United States

Address
- 3706 Florida Avenue Gurnee, Illinois, 60031; United States

District information
- Type: Public
- Grades: PreK–8
- Superintendent: Dr. Luis Correa

Other information
- Website: Official website

Gurnee School District 56 is a PK-8 school district located in the northern Lake County village of Gurnee, Illinois. Gurnee School District 56 is composed of four schools, Spaulding School, Prairie Trail School, Viking School and River Trail School.

The district includes portions of Gurnee, Wadsworth, Waukegan, and Park City.

== Schools ==
=== Spaulding School ===
Spaulding School is an elementary school that serves pre-kindergarten through second grade. As of 2024, the school's principal is Sara Rosheger.

=== Prairie Trail School ===
Prairie Trail School is an elementary school that offers third grade through fifth grade. As of 2024, the school's principal is Ms. Allison Waller.

=== Viking School ===
Viking School, built in 1998, is a middle school that offers sixth grade through eighth grade. As of 2024, the school's principal is Mr. Ryan Lazar.

=== River Trail School ===
River Trail School is a combined elementary and middle school that offers kindergarten through eighth grade. As of 2022, the school's principal is Dr. Jennifer Glickley.
