= Warren Township, Lake County, Illinois =

Warren Township
- Township
- Location in Lake County

- Lake County's location in Illinois
- Coordinates: 42°22′20″N 87°56′54″W
- Country: United States
- State: Illinois
- County: Lake
- Established: November 6, 1849

Government
  - Supervisor: Elmer C. Fallos

Area
  - Total: 36.76 sq mi (95.21 km^{2})
  - Land: 35.97 sq mi (93.17 km^{2})
  - Water: 0.78 sq mi (2.03 km^{2}) 2.14%
- Elevation: 709 ft (216 m)

Population (2020)
  - Total: 65,883
  - Density: 1,831/sq mi (707.1/km^{2})
- Time zone: UTC-6 (CST)
  - Summer (DST): UTC-5 (CDT)
- FIPS code: 17-097-78877
- Website: www.warrentownship.net

Warren Township is a township in Lake County, Illinois, USA. As of the 2020 census, its population was 65,883. The cities of Gurnee, Park City, and Grayslake lie within its borders. The township was established in 1850 by settlers who came from the town of Warren, New York. Both were named in honor of Major General Joseph Warren, killed at the Battle of Bunker Hill.

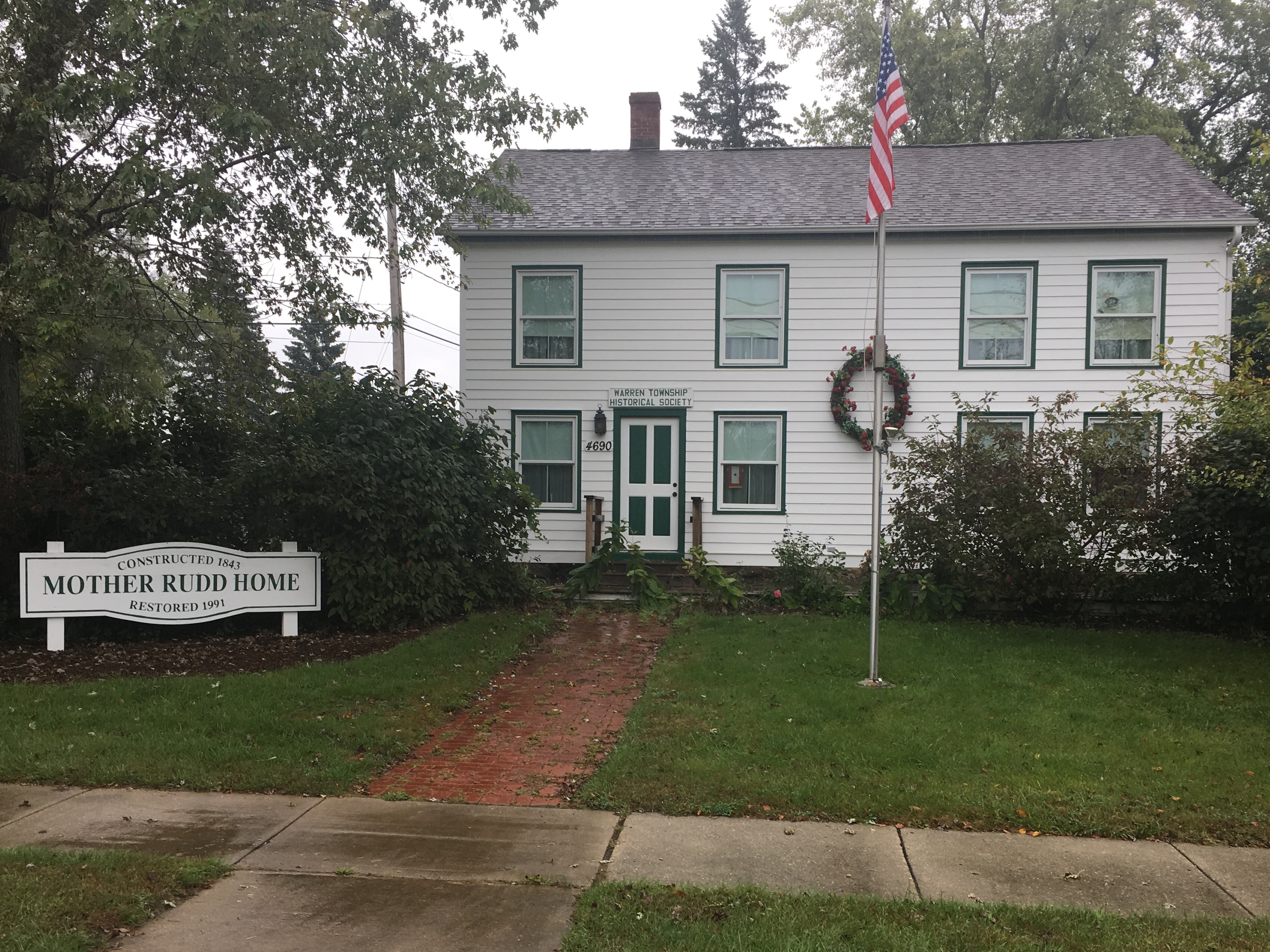
The Mother Rudd House, completed in 1843, is the oldest surviving structure in the township.

== Geography ==
Warren Township covers an area of 36.77 square miles (95.2 km^{2}); of this, 0.78 square miles (2.0 km^{2}) or 2.03 percent is water. Lakes in this township include Gages Lake, Grandwood Lake, Twin Lakes and Valley Lake.

=== Cities and towns ===
- Grayslake (east portion)
- Gurnee
- Lake Villa (east-most portions)
- Libertyville (northeast corner)
- Lindenhurst (US-45 business plaza area)
- Old Mill Creek (south quarter)
- Park City (west half)
- Third Lake (east third)
- Wadsworth (south part)
- Waukegan (far west area)

=== Census-designated place ===
- Gages Lake CDP
- Grandwood Park CDP

=== Adjacent townships ===
- Newport Township (north)
- Benton Township (northeast)
- Waukegan Township (east)
- Shields Township (southeast)
- Libertyville Township (south)
- Fremont Township (southwest)
- Avon Township (west)
- Lake Villa Township (west)

=== Cemeteries ===
The township contains three cemeteries: Highland Memorial Park, Saint Sava Serbian Orthodox Monastery, and Warren.

=== Major highways ===
- Interstate 94
- U.S. Route 41
- U.S. Route 45
- Illinois Route 21
- Illinois Route 43
- Illinois Route 120
- Illinois Route 131
- Illinois Route 132

=== Airports and landing strips ===
- O John Clark RLA Airport (historical)

=== Railroad lines ===
- The Milwaukee Road

== Demographics ==
Historical population
Census	Pop.	Note	%±
2010	64,841		—
2020	65,883		1.6%
U.S. Decennial Census

As of the 2020 census, there were 65,883 people living in the township. The population density was approximately 1,800/sq mi (690/km^{2}). There were 25,853 housing units. The racial makeup of the township was 55.8% White, 12.2% Asian, 9.1% Black or African American, 0.9% American Indian or Alaska Native, 0.1% Native Hawaiian or Pacific Islander, 10.8% from other races, and 11.2% from two or more races. Hispanic or Latino of any race were 22.8% of the population.

The median age in the township was 38.8 years. 23.4% of the population was under 18 years, and 10.8% were 65 years and over.

There were 25,747 households, out of which 28.5% had people under the age of 18 living with them and 27.7% had people 65 years and older living with them. 54% of households were married couples living together, 23.5% had a female householder with no spouse present, 13.1% had a male householder with no spouse present, and 9.3% were cohabiting couples living together. The average household size was 2.54 and the average family size was 3.10.

The median income for a household in the township was $86,649, and the median income for a family was $116,845. 7.4% of residents were below the poverty line.
