= Millburn, Illinois =

- Unincorporated community
- Location within Illinois Location within the United States
- Coordinates: 42°25′33″N 88°00′14″W
- Country: United States
- State: Illinois
- County: Lake
- Townships: Lake Villa, Newport
- Elevation: 748 ft (228 m)
- Time zone: UTC-6 (Central (CST))
  - Summer (DST): UTC-5 (CDT)
- Area codes: 847 & 224
- GNIS feature ID: 413564
- Millburn Historic District
- U.S. National Register of Historic Places
- U.S. Historic district
- Location: Millburn, Illinois
- Area: 27 acres (11 ha)
- Built: 1856
- Architectural style: Greek Revival, Italianate, Gothic;Queen Anne
- NRHP reference No.: 79000851
- Added to NRHP: September 18, 1979

Millburn is a former unincorporated community in Lake Villa Township and Newport Township, Lake County, Illinois, United States. Millburn is located at the junction of U.S. Route 45 and County Routes A10 and A14; it lies within the village of Old Mill Creek and borders Lindenhurst to the west. It is 5 miles (8 km) south of the Illinois-Wisconsin state border and 10 miles (16 km) west of Waukegan.

== History ==
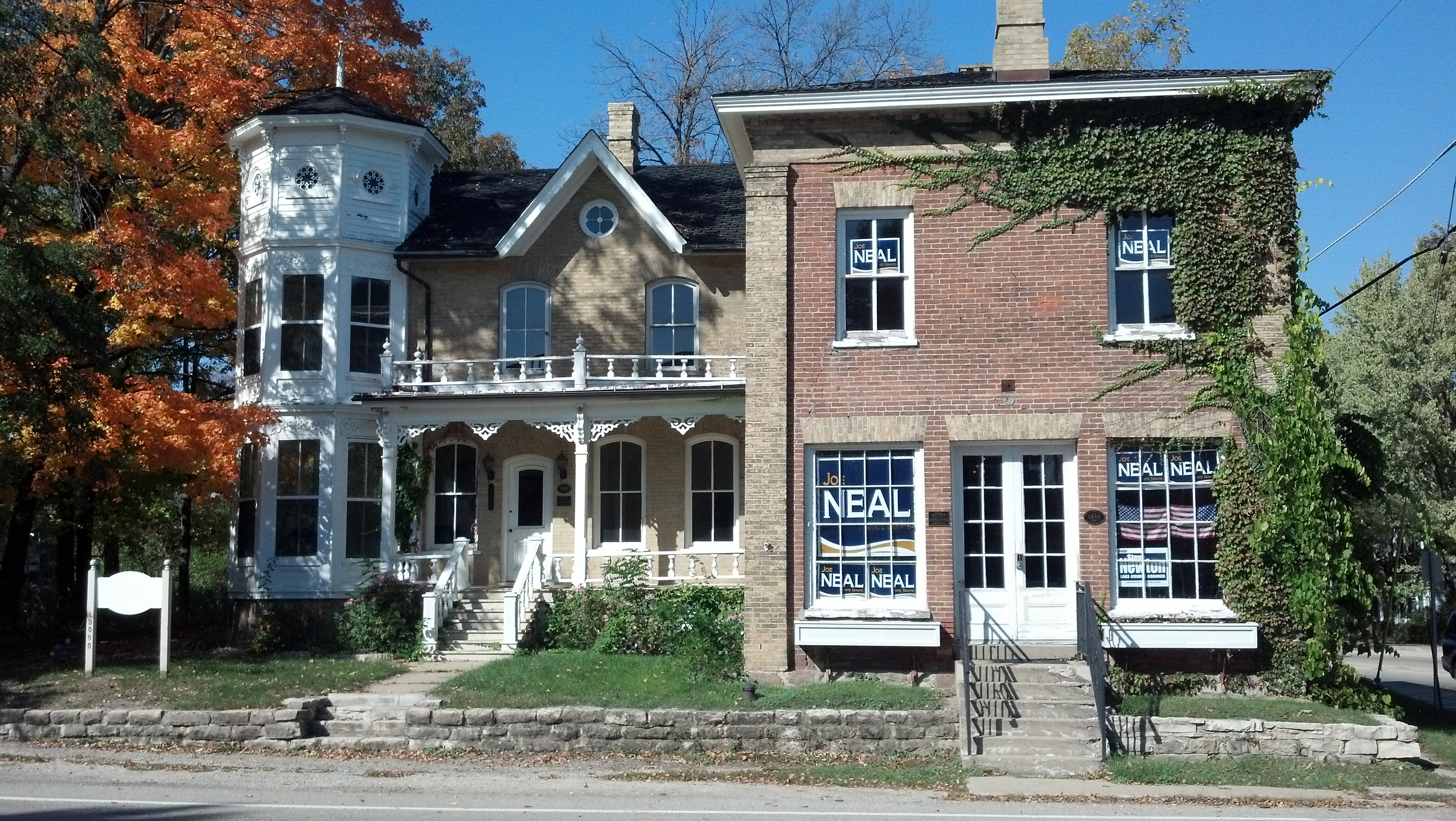
The Robert Strang Store, the first store in Millburn

Millburn was founded in 1837, when brothers George, Robert, and Peter Strang came from Ontario, Canada to settle in Illinois. They sought work on the Illinois and Michigan Canal, under construction at the time. After working for a year, the family issued claims on territory in Lake County, then returned to Canada. In 1839, they returned to their claim with their parents, a fourth brother (Jake), and their parents. The family was of Scottish descent, which lured other settlers of Scottish origin to what was then called Strang's Corners. By 1840, the First Congregational Church was founded.

Jake, Peter, and George Strang participated in the California Gold Rush. Jake appears to have accumulated significant wealth from it, judging by his ability to design a high-style house shortly afterward. Robert Strang remained in Millburn and opened a store in 1856. He is generally credited as the father of the settlement because he was the only one of his brothers who remained in Millburn without interruption and his store was the first in the vicinity. Robert's son John M. succeeded him in running the store. Cobbler Richard Pantall was another early settler. He opened a general merchandise store in Millburn in 1862. Pantall was named postmaster and used his store as the town post office starting in 1864, a role it maintained until 1904. James Jamieson came from Scotland in 1859 and later served as Lake County Treasurer.

The small settlement is unusual as an example of a mid-19th century rural community near Chicago. Although one of the roads through the village became U.S. Route 45, the village maintained its heritage. The oldest remaining buildings date back to 1856. The entire village was listed by the National Park Service on the National Register of Historic Places on September 18, 1979.

== Buildings ==
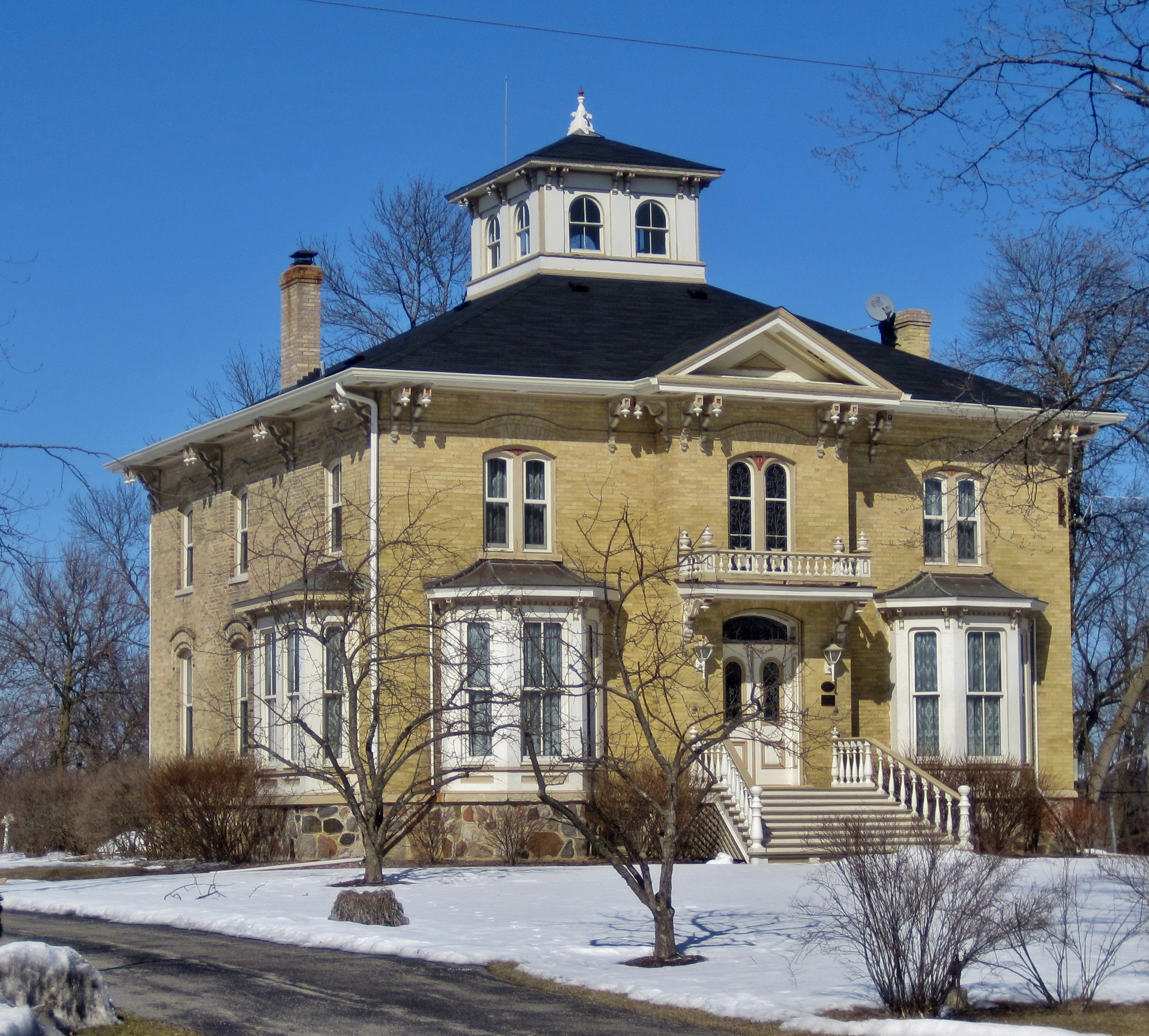
John M. Strang House

Almost all of the buildings in Millburn are part of the historic district. The only exception is a house on the southeast corner of Millburn Road and Route 45.

- Jake Strang House, 1856
- Robert Strang Store, 1856
- John M. Strang House, 1880
- Robert Strang House, 1867, designed by William Mavor
- Pantall–Martin Store, 1862, built for Richard Pantall
- James Jamieson House, c. 1868
- 18980 Millburn Road, c. 1865
- Dr. David B. Taylor House, built after 1865
- Samuel Smith House, possibly 1905. The south half may date before 1858.
- George L. Stewart House, 1870
- William Stewart House, date unknown
- Millburn Congregational Church, moved from Oak Park in 1937. A school addition was constructed in 1968.
- George Jamieson House, 1892
- 2nd building north of Millburn Road on Route 45, date unknown. Some sections may date before 1860.
- Arthur Johannsson Filling Station, c. 1930
- Richard Pantall House, 1868
- Edward Martin House, 1908
