= Park City, Illinois =

- City
- City of Park City
- Seal

- Location of Park City in Lake County, Illinois.
- Coordinates: 42°21′08″N 87°53′29″W
- Country: United States
- State: Illinois
- County: Lake
- Townships: Warren, Waukegan

Area
  - Total: 1.16 sq mi (3.00 km^{2})
  - Land: 1.16 sq mi (3.00 km^{2})
  - Water: 0.0039 sq mi (0.01 km^{2})
- Elevation: 715 ft (218 m)

Population (2020)
  - Total: 7,885
  - Density: 6,814.8/sq mi (2,631.19/km^{2})
- Time zone: UTC-6 (CST)
  - Summer (DST): UTC-5 (CDT)
- ZIP code: 60085
- Area code(s): 847, 224
- FIPS code: 17-57654
- GNIS feature ID: 2396144
- Website: parkcityil.com

Park City is a small city located in the Warren and Waukegan townships of Lake County, Illinois, United States, on the northern end of the Chicago metropolitan area. Per the 2020 census, the population was 7,885.

== History ==
Park City was incorporated in 1958 through the approval of a referendum by Park City residents. The incorporation was spearheaded by the owners of four trailer parks in the community who wanted to avoid annexation by the neighboring city of Waukegan. In the late 1970s, a federal lawsuit was filed against Park City, alleging that the city was engaging in housing discrimination against non-whites. Since that time, the city has become a multi-cultural community, accepting a wide diversity of people from different backgrounds and ethnicities.

Of the city's residential uses, two-thirds are manufactured residential housing and apartments, and one third is single-family housing. The city is split into residential, commercial and industrial zones. Park City sponsors a Chamber of Commerce to promote its growing business base.

== Geography ==
According to the 2021 census gazetteer files, Park City has a total area of 1.16 square miles (3.00 km^{2}), of which 1.16 square miles (3.00 km^{2}) (or 99.83%) is land and 0.00 square miles (0.00 km^{2}) (or 0.17%) is water.

== Demographics ==
Historical population
Census	Pop.	Note	%±
1960	1,408		—
1970	2,906		106.4%
1980	3,673		26.4%
1990	4,677		27.3%
2000	6,637		41.9%
2010	7,570		14.1%
2020	7,885		4.2%
U.S. Decennial Census; 2010 2020

=== Racial and ethnic composition ===
Park City city, Illinois – Racial and ethnic composition Note: the US Census treats Hispanic/Latino as an ethnic category. This table excludes Latinos from the racial categories and assigns them to a separate category. Hispanics/Latinos may be of any race.
Race / Ethnicity (NH = Non-Hispanic)	Pop 2000	Pop 2010	Pop 2020	% 2000	% 2010	% 2020
White alone (NH)	2,865	1,564	887	43.17%	20.66%	11.25%
Black or African American alone (NH)	493	529	710	7.43%	6.99%	9.00%
Native American or Alaska Native alone (NH)	10	7	2	0.15%	0.09%	0.03%
Asian alone (NH)	583	386	498	8.78%	5.10%	6.32%
Native Hawaiian or Pacific Islander alone (NH)	4	9	2	0.06%	0.12%	0.03%
Other race alone (NH)	12	34	42	0.18%	0.45%	0.53%
Mixed race or Multiracial (NH)	164	108	141	2.47%	1.43%	1.79%
Hispanic or Latino (any race)	2,506	4,933	5,603	37.76%	65.17%	71.06%
Total	6,637	7,570	7,885	100.00%	100.00%	100.00%

=== 2020 census ===
As of the 2020 census, Park City had a population of 7,885. There were 1,837 families residing in the city. The median age was 31.1 years. 30.9% of residents were under the age of 18 and 7.1% were 65 years of age or older. For every 100 females, there were 96.7 males, and for every 100 females age 18 and over, there were 94.4 males.

There were 2,588 households, of which 46.6% had children under the age of 18 living in them. Of all households, 41.0% were married-couple households, 19.3% were households with a male householder and no spouse or partner present, and 29.9% were households with a female householder and no spouse or partner present. About 23.7% of all households were made up of individuals and 6.9% had someone living alone who was 65 years of age or older.

There were 2,675 housing units at an average density of 2,308.02 per square mile (891.13/km^{2}), of which 3.3% were vacant. The homeowner vacancy rate was 0.7% and the rental vacancy rate was 3.3%.

=== Income and poverty ===
The median income for a household in the city was $50,860, and the median income for a family was $56,789. Males had a median income of $28,809 versus $22,790 for females. The per capita income for the city was $18,388. About 11.5% of families and 13.1% of the population were below the poverty line, including 19.3% of those under age 18 and 1.8% of those age 65 or over.

=== Households and housing ===
A diversity of housing exists within the city including single and multi-family housing as well as various mobile home parks. The 2000 median house value was $139,000 and the median rent cost was $679.

== Government ==
Park city is divided into three wards, with two aldermen representing each ward. City government consists of six aldermen, a city clerk, a city treasurer, and a mayor. Each are elected to four year terms. Zoning matters are reviewed by a combined Zoning Board of Appeals/Plan Commission.

The city is served by a full-time police department, a parks and recreation department, public works department, and building department. The city maintains a full-time teen center in cooperation with Warren Township, its own park system and bike trails.

The Mayor and Park City have developed a new plan to redevelop Greenleaf Street to serve as the focal point of the city. The first phase of the plan involves the installation of new sidewalks, decorative streetlights, and flowering trees and vegetation along Greenleaf Street. The second phase involves the development and implementation of architectural standards for office building development for properties along Greenleaf Street, to include landscape standards, parking lot light standards, architectural design standards, and decorative sign standards. The third phase involves developing incentives and encouraging development along the Greenleaf Street corridor in compliance with the architectural standards.

The first phase was accomplished, and streetlights and sidewalks were installed, the lights were turned on and the sidewalks were open to the public in a ceremony that took place on November 8, 2012. The second phase was accomplished through the adoption of the Greenleaf Street Overlay Zoning District on May 21, 2009, which provides the development standards for construction on Greenleaf Street, and phase three started with the completed construction of the Lake County Branch Court Complex on Greenleaf Street. Phase three is not yet completed, and there are properties yet to be developed on the corridor.

Park City has an aggressive policy on traffic enforcement, and the police department is one of the top agencies in the issuance of traffic citations, including DUI enforcement.

== Transportation ==
Pace provides bus service on Routes 564, 568 and 572 connecting Park City to downtown Waukegan and other destinations.

=== Major streets ===
- Skokie Highway
- Belvidere Road
- Greenleaf Avenue
- Washington Street
- Old Skokie Road

== Education ==
Most of Park City is in the Woodland Community Consolidated School District 50 and the Warren Township High School District 121. A few northern pieces are in the Gurnee School District 56 and the Warren Township High School District 121. An eastern portion is in the Waukegan Community Unit School District 60.

Park City is served by the Warren-Newport Public Library District.
