= Lindenhurst, Illinois =

- Village
- Flag Logo

- Location of Lindenhurst in Lake County, Illinois.
- Coordinates: 42°25′03″N 88°01′33″W
- Country: United States
- State: Illinois
- County: Lake

Area
  - Total: 4.86 sq mi (12.60 km^{2})
  - Land: 4.53 sq mi (11.72 km^{2})
  - Water: 0.34 sq mi (0.87 km^{2})
- Elevation: 764 ft (233 m)

Population (2020)
  - Total: 14,406
  - Density: 3,182.5/sq mi (1,228.77/km^{2})
- Time zone: UTC-6 (CST)
  - Summer (DST): UTC-5 (CDT)
- ZIP code: 60046
- Area code(s): 847, 224
- FIPS code: 17-43770
- GNIS feature ID: 2398444
- Home value: $202,336 (2013)
- Website: www.lindenhurstil.org

Lindenhurst is a village in Lake County, Illinois, United States. Per the 2020 census, the population was 14,406. Lindenhurst lies within Lake Villa Township.

== History ==
The Village of Lindenhurst lies within the Valparaiso moraine from the most recent Ice Age. The area is rich in lakes and swamp land; it was inhabited by the Potawatomi Indian tribe, who mixed agriculture with hunting and fishing. The rich soil ultimately attracted European farmers. An expedition led by Colbee Benton in the 1830s was followed by treaties by which the Potawatomi, the Sauk and the Blackhawk Tribes agreed to leave the area. Most Euro-American settlers came from the east coast, the first recorded being the Pennsylvanian Noer Potter. There were also a number of early Scottish, German and English arrivals.

Incorporation papers for Lindenhurst were filed in November 1956 with Lake County Judge Minard Hulse. The first village officials were elected in a December 1956 election, with 90% voter turnout. The village was incorporated on January 16, 1957.

The first village president was Lee R. Lewis, and meetings were held on Saturdays to accommodate the commuting members of the board and community. The first meeting was held in the home of trustee Helen Skelton. Another election – mandated by law – was held in April 1957, and Robert Randall was elected the new president. The board held fundraisers like dances to purchase such things as stationery and record books. After his first year in office, President Randall reflected on the successes: ordinances and zoning laws had been passed, roads were being graded, snow removed, and police were patrolling the village. Running water from a tower near Fairfield Road and Hawthorne Drive arrived in the late 1950s.

In June, 2001, Lindenhurst was the site of a shootout between neo-Nazi National Alliance member Eric Hanson and local police. Police had attempted to arrest Hanson on charges of unlawful possession of a firearm before he managed to escape and lead a car chase to a grocery store on Grand Avenue. A standoff between Hanson and the Lindenhurst Police Department forces lasted until the next morning, when police stormed the building and found Hanson in a meat locker. During a second confrontation, Hanson was shot twelve times by police and died on the scene.

== Incorporation ==
=== Housing ===
The village of Lindenhurst grew out of the farm of a wealthy landowner in northern Illinois. The Ernst E. Lehmann farm, known as Lindenhurst, was acquired by developer Morton "Mort" Engle, who bought it from Lehmann family friend Edna Siebel. The name Lindenhurst came from the two rows of linden trees outlining the original farmhouse. Engle subdivided the 600-acre (2.4 km^{2}) farm in 1952, and in 1953, the first homes were built behind what is now Linden Plaza. Engle Homes at the time cost $12,000–$15,000, roof extra. "The idyllic family homes of Lindenhurst offered the perfect solution for a home-hungry nation," states local historian Joseph Brysiewicz. In 1961, Ted Flanagan was elected mayor, and 200 houses were being built each year, under the control of Engle. After building an estimated 2,000 homes, Mort Engle sold his remaining 250 acres (1.0 km^{2}) to the U.S. Home Corporation and 200 acres (0.81 km^{2}) to the Federal Life Insurance Company and moved to Arizona. 550 acres (2.2 km^{2}) were annexed into the village, and the growth of Lindenhurst brought up school and public safety issues.

=== Education ===
The first school was completed in September 1958. Built on land from the Howard Bonner farm and redistricted from the Millburn school district to Lake Villa Community Consolidated School District 41, the school was named B.J. Hooper School after District 41 school board president and prominent Lake Villa citizen B.J. Hooper.

=== Business Development ===
Lindenhurst's first business, Thor's Shell, stood at the intersection of Grand Avenue and Lindenhurst Drive. By 1960, the first major commercial development in Lindenhurst was the building of Linden Plaza, featuring Slove Bakery, Village Laundry, Linden Cleaners, and Piggly Wiggly. Other businesses established in Lindenhurst included Linden Texaco, Linden Barber Shop, Ben Franklin Variety Store, and Stretch-A-Dollar Clothing Store. The Lindenhurst Civic Center built its own facility in 1961 using the remains of the original Lindenhurst Farm ice house to anchor its building. It served as a meeting place for groups and organizations, card parties, socials, polling place, wedding receptions and family reunions. A school for the old Lindenhurst farm served as Village Hall until it burned down, and the offices moved to Linden Plaza. By 1970, the village numbered 3,141 people. The village offices couldn't be crammed into Linden Plaza any longer, and the new village hall that was built in 1974 housed office space, the mayor, the police department, the building inspector, and the village garage.

=== Public Safety ===
The Lindenhurst police force was all-volunteer at first, buying their own uniforms and using their own cars; fundraisers were held to pay for salaries and a patrol car. A full-time police position was created in 1963, and the village acquired a reputation as a "speed trap", due to radar use by the police. Lindenhurst became front-page headline material on November 27, 2006, when the village's first homicide in over nine years took place. A Burger King manager was killed in an apparent robbery at the national fast-food chain's Lindenhurst franchise.

In 1965, the village created its first sanitary district, replacing individual septic systems with a sewer system. Streets were paved and gutters installed during this period as well. Ted Flanagan was reelected mayor in 1969 and served until 1983.

=== Community ===
Besides the village's 25th anniversary, the 1980s brought the village, cable TV access, fast food, and a budget of $1.5 million. Lindenfest was founded by volunteers in 1983. It grew out of tents and booths set up by local clubs and organizations in the village hall parking lot. Today it has a carnival, games, contests, marathons, and music. Other additions to Lindenhurst in recent years include Victory Lakes, the Lindenhurst-Lake Villa Chamber of Commerce, and the Lindenhurst Park District.

The population in 1990 was 8,044 and is over 14,000 today. In a 1999 Lake Villa and Lindenhurst Review article, Village Administrator James Stevens said that Lindenhurst "has been able to keep the small town flavor, in large part, through selective land annexation, and by carefully choosing developers for high quality but diversified housing types, including single family, town homes and condominiums. And all the housing types have to be integrated with the lakes, marshes, open space and forested areas of the village." The Lindenhurst motto is "Developing Today for Tomorrow".

== Geography ==
According to the 2021 census gazetteer files, Lindenhurst has a total area of 4.86 square miles (12.59 km^{2}), of which 4.53 square miles (11.73 km^{2}) (or 93.07%) is land and 0.34 square miles (0.88 km^{2}) (or 6.93%) is water.

Lindenhurst's first stop light was erected at Grand Avenue and Sand Lake Road in the 1980s.

=== Major streets ===
- Grand Avenue
- Grass Lake Road
- Savage Road
- Gelden Road
- Deep Lake Road
- Granada Boulevard
- Sand Lake Road
- Beck Road

== Demographics ==
Historical population
Census	Pop.	Note	%±
1960	1,259		—
1970	3,141		149.5%
1980	6,220		98.0%
1990	8,038		29.2%
2000	12,539		56.0%
2010	14,462		15.3%
2020	14,406		−0.4%
U.S. Decennial Census; 2010 2020

=== Racial and ethnic composition ===
Lindenhurst village, Illinois – Racial and ethnic composition Note: the US Census treats Hispanic/Latino as an ethnic category. This table excludes Latinos from the racial categories and assigns them to a separate category. Hispanics/Latinos may be of any race.
Race / Ethnicity (NH = Non-Hispanic)	Pop 2000	Pop 2010	Pop 2020	% 2000	% 2010	% 2020
White alone (NH)	11,320	12,182	11,044	90.28%	84.23%	76.66%
Black or African American alone (NH)	169	332	391	1.35%	2.30%	2.71%
Native American or Alaska Native alone (NH)	17	29	20	0.14%	0.20%	0.14%
Asian alone (NH)	369	655	733	2.94%	4.53%	5.09%
Native Hawaiian or Pacific Islander alone (NH)	1	4	2	0.01%	0.03%	0.01%
Other race alone (NH)	17	14	46	0.14%	0.10%	0.32%
Mixed race or Multiracial (NH)	138	262	516	1.10%	1.81%	3.58%
Hispanic or Latino (any race)	508	984	1,654	4.05%	6.80%	11.48%
Total	12,539	14,462	14,406	100.00%	100.00%	100.00%

=== 2020 census ===
As of the 2020 census, Lindenhurst had a population of 14,406. The population density was 2,961.76 inhabitants per square mile (1,143.54/km^{2}), and housing unit density was 1,066.41 per square mile (411.74/km^{2}).

The median age was 40.4 years. 24.9% of residents were under the age of 18 and 13.2% of residents were 65 years of age or older. For every 100 females, there were 96.2 males, and for every 100 females age 18 and over, there were 92.8 males age 18 and over.

100.0% of residents lived in urban areas, while 0.0% lived in rural areas.

There were 5,040 households, of which 38.9% had children under the age of 18 living in them. Of all households, 64.0% were married-couple households, 11.8% were households with a male householder and no spouse or partner present, and 19.7% were households with a female householder and no spouse or partner present. About 18.0% of all households were made up of individuals, and 6.9% had someone living alone who was 65 years of age or older. There were 3,894 families residing in the village.

There were 5,187 housing units, of which 2.8% were vacant. The homeowner vacancy rate was 1.1% and the rental vacancy rate was 4.7%.

=== Income and poverty ===
The median income for a household in the village was $115,495, and the median income for a family was $122,719. Males had a median income of $72,033 versus $49,544 for females. The per capita income for the village was $44,420. About 3.4% of families and 4.3% of the population were below the poverty line, including 3.9% of those under age 18 and 4.3% of those age 65 or over.
