= Old Mill Creek, Illinois =

Old Mill Creek
- Village
- Location of Old Mill Creek in Lake County, Illinois.
- Coordinates: 42°25′50″N 87°59′52″W
- Country: United States
- State: Illinois
- County: Lake

Area
  - Total: 10.85 sq mi (28.09 km^{2})
  - Land: 10.67 sq mi (27.64 km^{2})
  - Water: 0.17 sq mi (0.45 km^{2})
- Elevation: 715 ft (218 m)

Population (2020)
  - Total: 162
  - Density: 15.2/sq mi (5.86/km^{2})
- Time zone: UTC-6 (CST)
  - Summer (DST): UTC-5 (CDT)
- ZIP codes: 60083, 60046
- Area code(s): 847, 224
- FIPS code: 17-55639
- GNIS feature ID: 2399567
- Website: oldmillcreekil.govoffice3.com

Old Mill Creek is a village in Lake County, Illinois, United States. Per the 2020 census, the population was 162.

== History ==
In 1838 a man known by the name of Jacob Miller built a sawmill along a tributary of the Des Plaines River, of which he named Mill Creek. However, this year is debated and historians believe it could have been built between 1835 and 1840.

There were no public schools in the area until 1840. It is reported that there were nearly a dozen instructional buildings built between the mid-1800s and 1900. Although the exact date is unknown, it is believed that Browe School existed since 1859 and would remain open for 101 years until 1960. The land was then sold to a private resident.

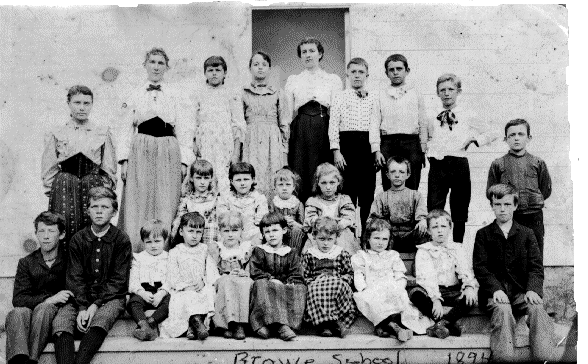
Browe School, Old Mill Creek 1894

In 1850 land was purchased in order to construct a cemetery and it would stay in place until 1883 when the remains of nearly 80 individuals were moved to their current resting place. The oldest headstone dates to 1826.

In 1873 a train station was built along the Chicago, Milwaukee, St. Paul and Pacific Railroad in the neighboring village (once another unincorporated area) of Gurnee. This over time caused the settlement to grow.

Old Mill Creek was incorporated as a village in 1959.

The village has received fire support from Wadsworth, IL since the 1960s.

== Geography ==
According to the 2021 census gazetteer files, Old Mill Creek has a total area of 10.85 square miles (28.10 km^{2}), of which 10.67 square miles (27.64 km^{2}) (or 98.39%) is land and 0.18 square miles (0.47 km^{2}) (or 1.61%) is water.

=== Major streets ===
- Tri-State Tollway
- Rosecrans Road
- Edwards Road
- Hunt Club Road
- Main Street
- Old Town Ct.
- Wadsworth Road
- Millburn Road
- Stearns School Road

== Demographics ==
Historical population
Census	Pop.	Note	%±
1960	149		—
1970	164		10.1%
1980	84		−48.8%
1990	73		−13.1%
2000	251		243.8%
2010	178		−29.1%
2020	162		−9.0%
U.S. Decennial Census; 2010 2020

As of the 2020 census there were 162 people, 80 households, and 67 families residing in the village. The population density was 14.94 inhabitants per square mile (5.77/km^{2}). There were 80 housing units at an average density of 7.38 per square mile (2.85/km^{2}). The racial makeup of the village was 82.10% White, 0.62% African American, 0.62% Native American, 0.62% Asian, 0.00% Pacific Islander, 5.56% from other races, and 10.49% from two or more races. Hispanic or Latino of any race were 11.11% of the population.

There were 80 households, out of which 20.0% had children under the age of 18 living with them, 41.25% were married couples living together, 41.25% had a female householder with no husband present, and 16.25% were non-families. 13.75% of all households were made up of individuals, and 3.75% had someone living alone who was 65 years of age or older. The average household size was 2.73 and the average family size was 2.50.

The village's age distribution consisted of 18.5% under the age of 18, 7.0% from 18 to 24, 14% from 25 to 44, 27.5% from 45 to 64, and 33.0% who were 65 years of age or older. The median age was 61.1 years. For every 100 females, there were 102.0 males. For every 100 females age 18 and over, there were 111.7 males.

The median income for a household in the village was $100,648, and the median income for a family was $101,065. Males had a median income of $87,991 versus $33,750 for females. The per capita income for the village was $39,789. None of the population was below the poverty line.

Old Mill Creek village, Illinois – Racial and ethnic composition Note: the US Census treats Hispanic/Latino as an ethnic category. This table excludes Latinos from the racial categories and assigns them to a separate category. Hispanics/Latinos may be of any race.
Race / Ethnicity (NH = Non-Hispanic)	Pop 2000	Pop 2010	Pop 2020	% 2000	% 2010	% 2020
White alone (NH)	218	144	131	86.85%	80.90%	80.86%
Black or African American alone (NH)	6	8	1	2.39%	4.49%	0.62%
Native American or Alaska Native alone (NH)	0	0	1	0.00%	0.00%	0.62%
Asian alone (NH)	16	8	1	6.37%	4.49%	0.62%
Native Hawaiian or Pacific Islander alone (NH)	0	0	0	0.00%	0.00%	0.00%
Other race alone (NH)	1	0	0	0.40%	0.00%	0.00%
Mixed race or Multiracial (NH)	4	0	10	1.59%	0.00%	6.17%
Hispanic or Latino (any race)	6	18	18	2.39%	10.11%	11.11%
Total	251	178	162	100.00%	100.00%	100.00%

== Notable person ==
- Bruce Wolf (1953― ), Chicago sportscaster and radio host. Bought a home in Old Mill Creek in 2010.
