= Wadsworth, Illinois =

- Village
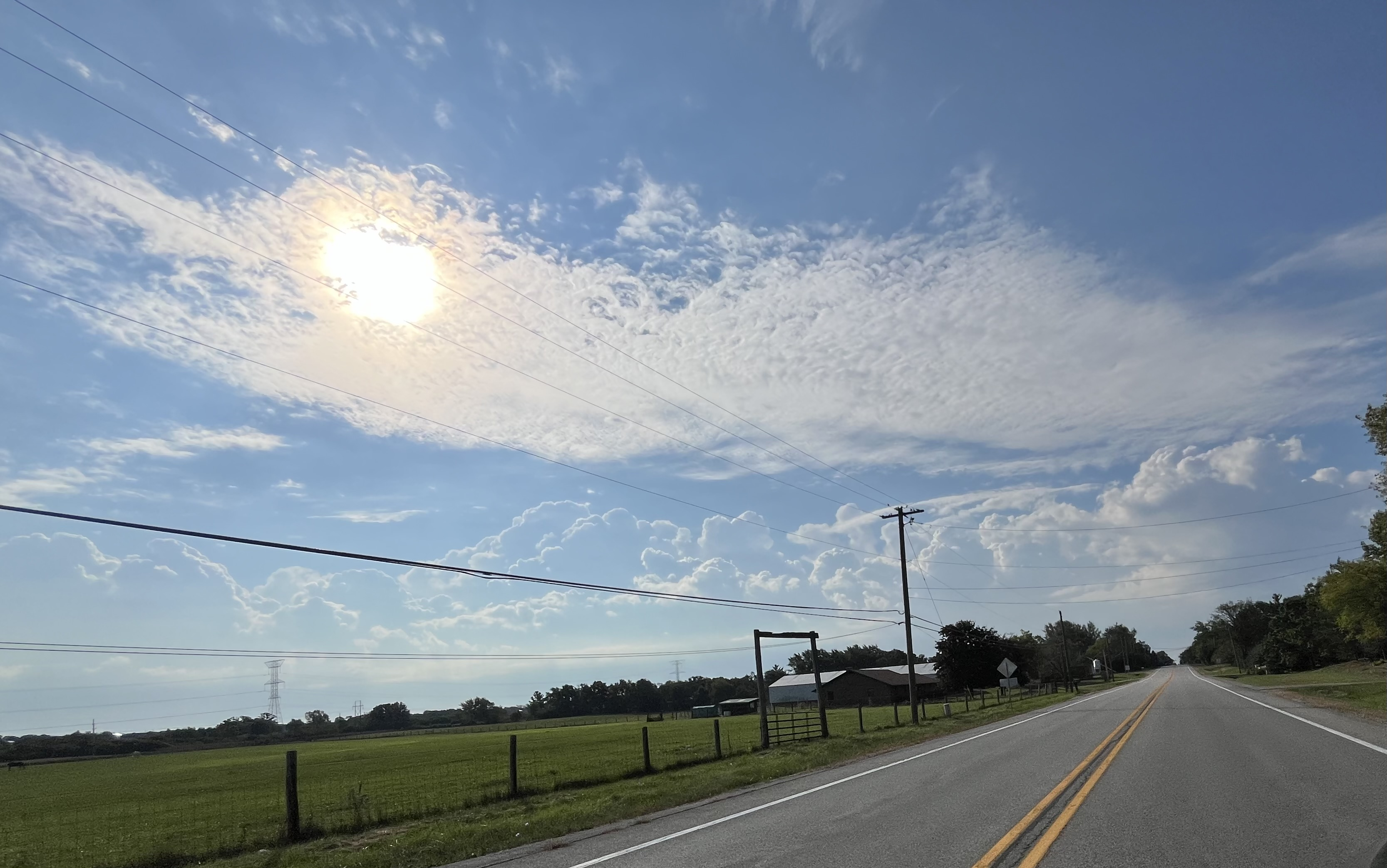
- Approaching Wadsworth
- Motto: "The Village of Country Living"
- Location of Wadsworth in Lake County, Illinois.
- Coordinates: 42°25′37″N 87°55′17″W
- Country: United States
- State: Illinois
- County: Lake

Area
  - Total: 9.93 sq mi (25.73 km^{2})
  - Land: 9.85 sq mi (25.50 km^{2})
  - Water: 0.089 sq mi (0.23 km^{2})
- Elevation: 722 ft (220 m)

Population (2020)
  - Total: 3,517
  - Density: 357.3/sq mi (137.94/km^{2})
- Time zone: UTC-6 (CST)
  - Summer (DST): UTC-5 (CDT)
- ZIP code: 60083
- Area code: 847
- FIPS code: 17-78370
- GNIS feature ID: 2400079
- Website: www.villageofwadsworth.org

Wadsworth is a village in Lake County, Illinois, United States. Per the 2020 census, the population was 3,517. It is named after E. S. Wadsworth, who was a major stockholder for the Chicago, Milwaukee, St. Paul and Pacific Railroad, which passes through the village.

== Geography ==
According to the 2021 census gazetteer files, Wadsworth has a total area of 9.93 square miles (25.72 km^{2}), of which 9.84 square miles (25.49 km^{2}) (or 99.10%) is land and 0.09 square miles (0.23 km^{2}) (or 0.90%) is water.

=== Major streets ===
- Tri-State Tollway
- Old US-41
- Russell Road
- Kilbourne Road
- Delany Road
- Skokie Highway
- Rosecrans Road
- 21st Street
- Wadsworth Road
- Cashmore Road
- Green Bay Road
- Dilleys Road

== Demographics ==
Historical population
Census	Pop.	Note	%±
1880	64		—
1970	756		—
1980	1,104		46.0%
1990	1,826		65.4%
2000	3,083		68.8%
2010	3,815		23.7%
2020	3,517		−7.8%
U.S. Decennial Census; 2010 2020

=== Racial and ethnic composition ===
Wadsworth village, Illinois – Racial and ethnic composition Note: the US Census treats Hispanic/Latino as an ethnic category. This table excludes Latinos from the racial categories and assigns them to a separate category. Hispanics/Latinos may be of any race.
Race / Ethnicity (NH = Non-Hispanic)	Pop 2000	Pop 2010	Pop 2020	% 2000	% 2010	% 2020
White alone (NH)	2,842	3,180	2,581	92.18%	83.36%	73.39%
Black or African American alone (NH)	53	154	137	1.72%	4.04%	3.90%
Native American or Alaska Native alone (NH)	4	3	1	0.13%	0.08%	0.03%
Asian alone (NH)	32	89	70	1.04%	2.33%	1.99%
Native Hawaiian or Pacific Islander alone (NH)	0	2	0	0.00%	0.05%	0.00%
Other race alone (NH)	4	5	17	0.13%	0.13%	0.48%
Mixed race or Multiracial (NH)	39	45	141	1.27%	1.18%	4.01%
Hispanic or Latino (any race)	109	337	570	3.54%	8.83%	16.21%
Total	3,083	3,815	3,517	100.00%	100.00%	100.00%

=== 2020 census ===
As of the 2020 census, Wadsworth had a population of 3,517, with 1,307 households and 1,098 families. The population density was 354.07 inhabitants per square mile (136.71/km^{2}), and there were 1,377 housing units at an average density of 138.63 per square mile (53.53/km^{2}).

The median age was 49.9 years. 18.8% of residents were under the age of 18 and 21.2% of residents were 65 years of age or older. For every 100 females, there were 100.7 males, and for every 100 females age 18 and over, there were 101.8 males age 18 and over.

74.5% of residents lived in urban areas, while 25.5% lived in rural areas.

Of the village's households, 26.0% had children under the age of 18 living in them. 67.9% were married-couple households, 11.9% were households with a male householder and no spouse or partner present, and 15.7% were households with a female householder and no spouse or partner present. About 16.0% of all households were made up of individuals, and 9.2% had someone living alone who was 65 years of age or older.

Of all housing units, 5.1% were vacant. The homeowner vacancy rate was 1.5% and the rental vacancy rate was 8.3%.

=== Income and poverty ===
The median income for a household in the village was $101,307, and the median income for a family was $128,333. Males had a median income of $72,589 versus $40,195 for females. The per capita income for the village was $51,750. About 1.5% of families and 2.5% of the population were below the poverty line, including 9.6% of those under age 18 and 0.0% of those age 65 or over.

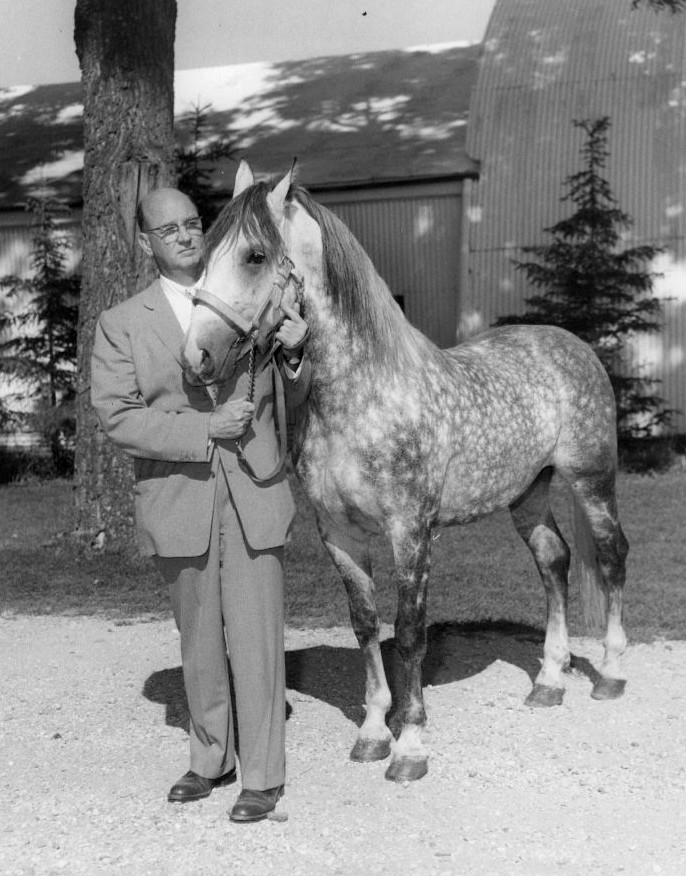
Tempel Farms founder Tempel Smith with one of his stallions in 1958. The farm was then located in Spring Grove, Illinois.

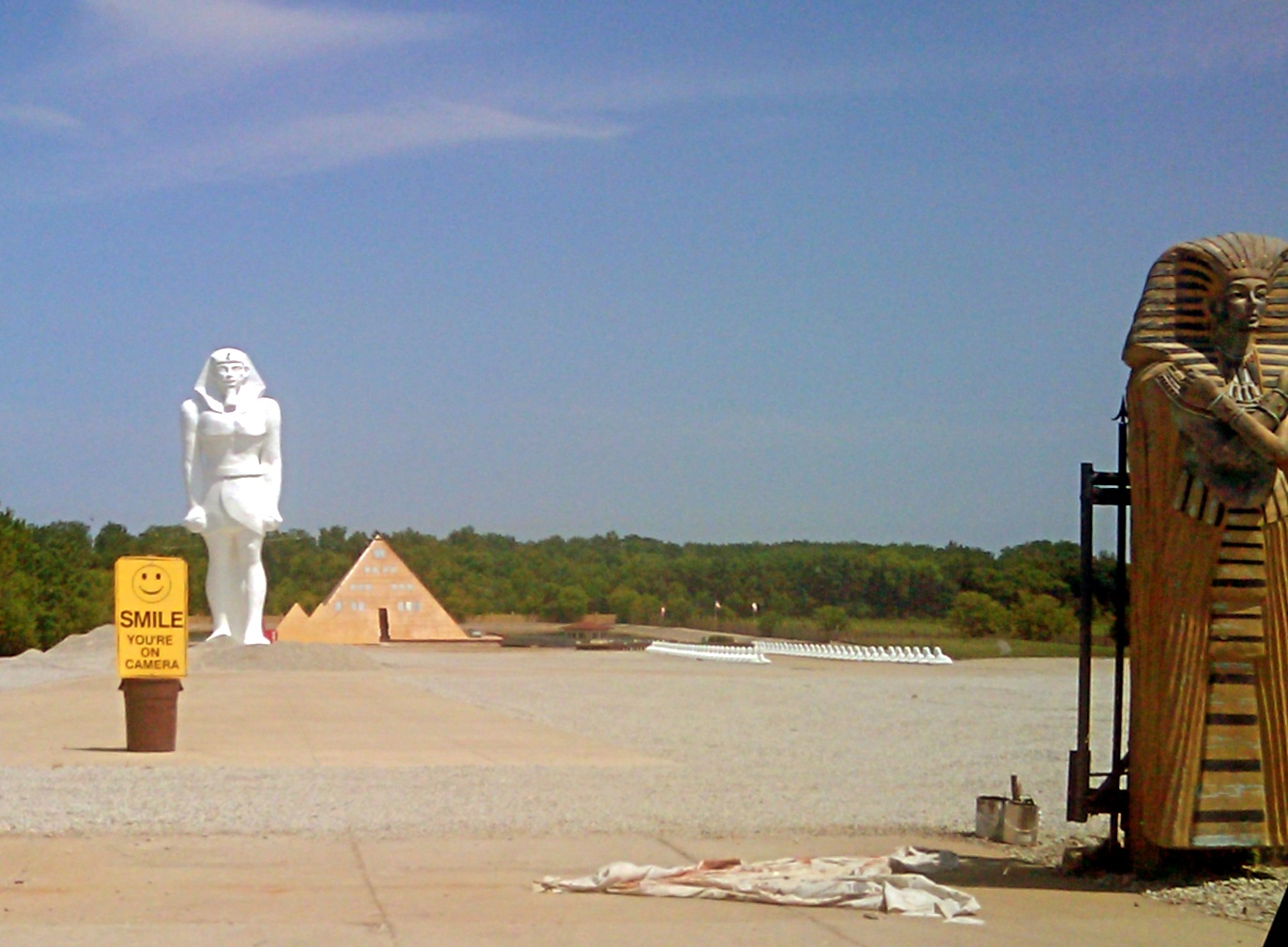
The pyramid house and statues as seen from behind the walls.

Wadsworth is home to the Tempel Farms Lipizzan Horses.

Wadsworth also contains the pyramid house. "The largest 24-karat gold-plated object ever created" is the private home of Jim Onan, a wealthy Armenian garage builder, and his family. The Onans occasionally open the house for tours of the 17,000-square-foot (1,600 m^{2}) 6-story structure containing a replica of King Tut's tomb. The walled property also features a triple-pyramid garage, a 64-foot-tall (20 m) statue of Ramesses II, and a recreation of King Tutankhamun's tomb. In 2018, the pyramid house was severely damaged by fire.
