= Wicker Park =

Wicker Park may mean:

- Wicker Park (film), a 2004 film directed by Paul McGuigan
  - Wicker Park (soundtrack), the accompanying film soundtrack
- Wicker Park, Chicago, a neighborhood in the West Town community area outside of the Chicago Loop
- Wicker Park (Chicago park), an urban park in the Wicker Park neighborhood outside of Chicago's West Town
