= Irazu (disambiguation) =

Irazú is a volcano.

Irazu may also refer to:

- Irazú (satellite)
- Irazu Costa Rica Restaurant, a restaurant in Chicago, Illinois
- Irazu, a Cartoon Network animated short
