= 1958 West North Avenue =

Apartment building in Chicago, Illinois

Coordinates: 41.9106°N 87.6773°W

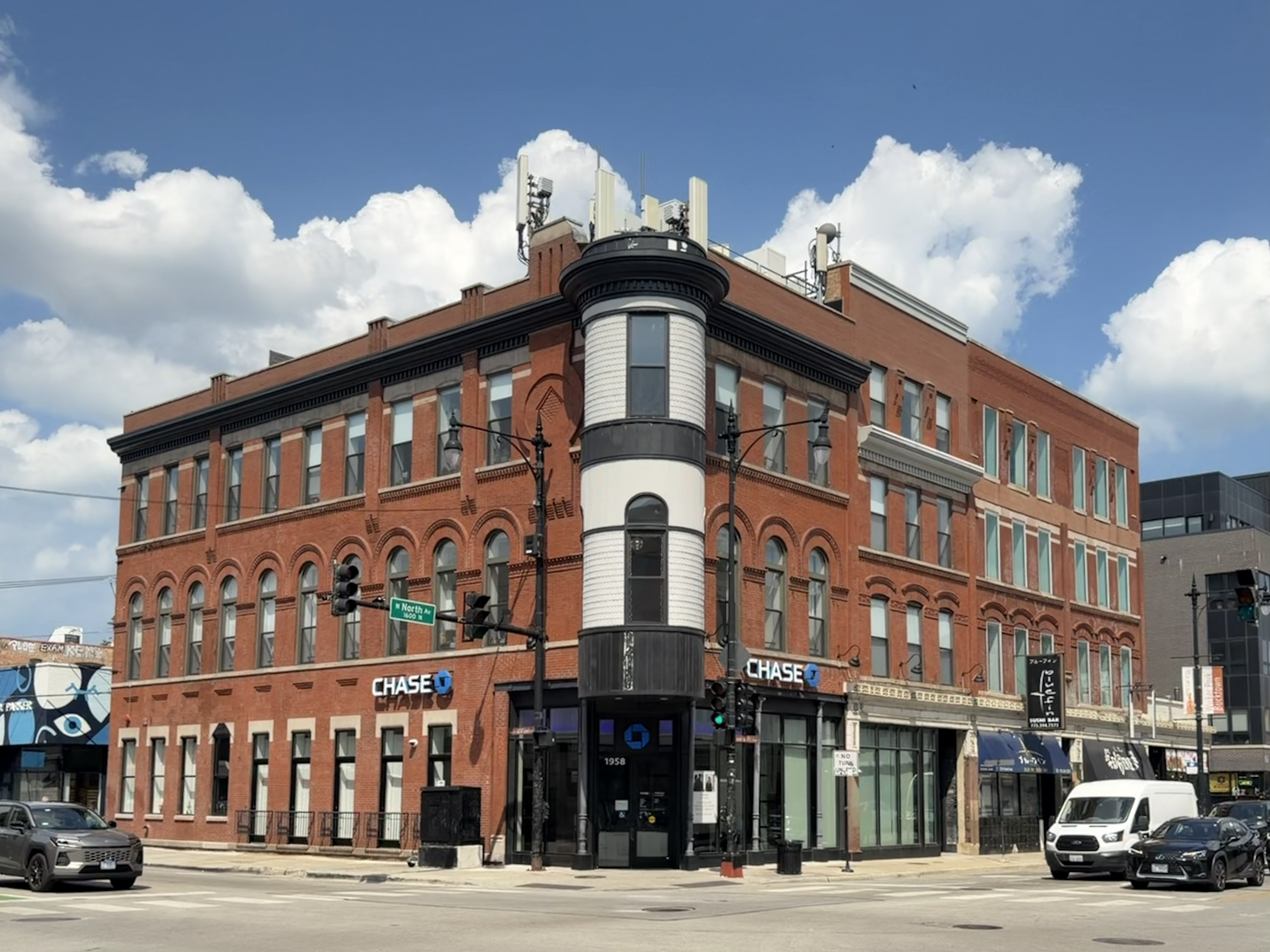
- 1958 W North Avenue in 2026
- Interactive map of the 1958 West North Avenue area

General information
- Construction started: 1870s

1958 West North Avenue is a building in the Wicker Park neighborhood of West Town, Chicago, located at the intersections of Damen Avenue, North Avenue, and Milwaukee Avenue. Built in the 1870s, it had a corner turret, cornice, and mansard roof prior to the 1960s. The ground floor housed a bar continuously from 1979 until 2017; since 2005, that bar had been Tavern, a well-known nightlife haunt. It had also housed a dance club in its upper floors since the 1990s. The building is owned by Tefik Menetti of the nightclub-owning Menetti family; he purchased it from his brother Sam in February 2017.

After the closure of Tavern, the ground floor remained empty until 2022, when Chase Bank made plans to consolidate two of its branches in Wicker Park to a location in the building. The branch of the bank is expected to move in during August 2023; in the previous year, the building and its neighbor experienced much restoration, including a reconstruction of the turret and cornice; however, cell towers placed on the roof prevented restoration of the mansard roofs.
