= Grand Avenue (Chicago) =

Street in Chicago

- (530 North/500 North)
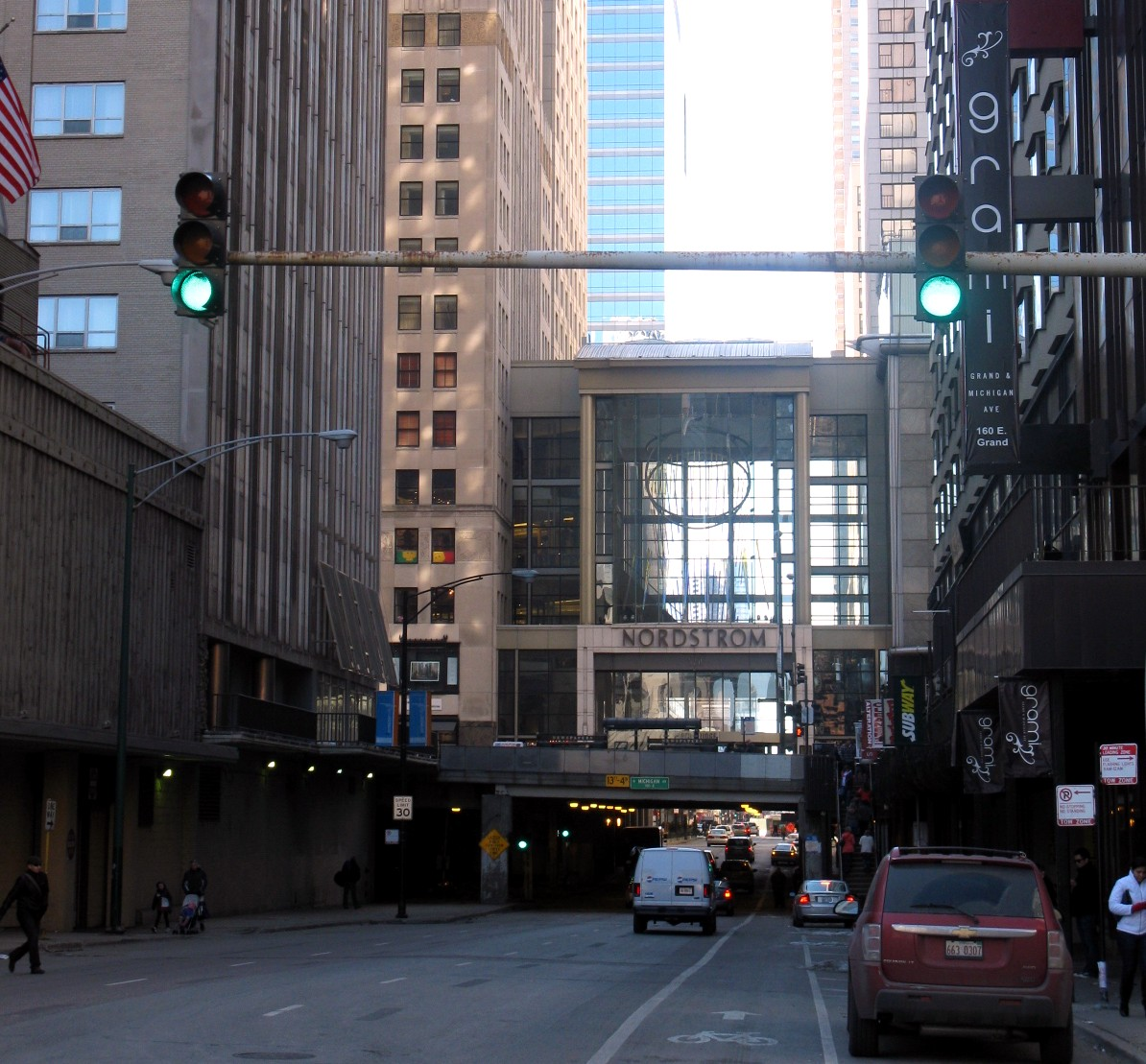
- Grand Avenue approaching Lower Michigan Avenue, 2011
- Interactive map of Grand Avenue
- Part of: CR 20 (DuPage); CR B18 (Cook)
- Maintained by: Chicago Department of Streets and Sanitation, various local agencies
- Length: 19 mi (31 km)
- Location: Elmhurst, Bensenville, Northlake, Franklin Park, River Grove, Elmwood Park, Chicago
- Coordinates: 41.89166°N 87.62807°W
- West end: US 20 / Lake Street at IL 83 / Kingery Highway in Addison
- East end: Navy Pier in Chicago

Grand Avenue is a major east-west street in the city of Chicago and nearby DuPage County, although it deviates somewhat from Chicago's grid system, as it is diagonal west of Western Avenue. The street runs from the Kingery Highway (also known as U.S. Route 20 and Illinois Route 83) in Elmhurst, east through the western suburbs, and then east-southeast into Chicago, through the Magnificent Mile shopping area, and continuing out to Navy Pier, where it ends. This is a distance of about 19 miles (31 km).

== History ==
Grand Avenue was originally known as Whiskey Point Road, first used as a trail by the Miami, Illini and many other Native Nations, it leads to the West Side of Chicago, near Western Avenue. On the Near North Side it was called Indiana Street. Thomas Jefferson Vance Owen, Chicago's first town president, is believed to have named it in 1833 after naming Chicago, "a grand place to live."

== Transit ==
Grand Avenue is serviced by several transit lines.

The Blue Line stops at Grand at Halsted Street and Milwaukee Avenue; this stop is the first one north of The Loop. The Red Line also stops at Grand at State Street, close to the Magnificent Mile and Navy Pier. In 2007, the CTA began a renovation project at the station, which was completed in 2012. Metra's Milwaukee District West Line and the North Central Service parallel Grand Avenue between River Grove and the West Loop

The 65 Grand bus route runs along Grand Avenue, from Nordica Avenue near Mont Clare station to Navy Pier. 319 Grand Avenue, a Pace bus route, serves Grand Avenue west from Nordica Avenue, serving the neighborhood of Montclare in Chicago as well as multiple suburbs like Franklin Park and Elmwood Park. The route usually runs from Nordica Avenue in Chicago to Wolf Road/North Avenue in Northlake. However, certain buses on the same route travel northwest along Wolf Road and Franklin Avenue/Green Street toward Bensenville station.

== Major intersections ==
County	Location	mi	km	Destinations	Notes
DuPage	Elmhurst	0.0	0.0	US 20 (Lake Street) to IL 83 (Kingery Highway) / I-290	Western terminus
Cook	Franklin Park	4.3	6.9	US 12 / US 45 (Mannheim Road)	
Cook	River Grove	6.9	11.1	IL 171 (Thatcher Avenue)	
Cook	Elmwood Park–Chicago line	8.4	13.5	IL 43 (N Harlem Avenue)	
Cook	Chicago	11.7	18.8	IL 50 (N Cicero Avenue)	
Cook	Chicago	12.3	19.8	IL 64 (W North Avenue)	
Cook	Chicago	18.9	30.4	US 41 (N DuSable Lake Shore Drive)	Interchange
Cook	Chicago	19.1	30.7	Navy Pier	Eastern terminus
1.000 mi = 1.609 km; 1.000 km = 0.621 mi
