= Prairie School Freakout =

Studio album by Eleventh Dream Day
- Released: 1988, 2003
- Recorded: July 1987
- Genre: Indie rock; noise rock; alt-country
- Length: 47:00 (1988 original); 58:16 (1990 CD release); 68:14 (2003 re-release)
- Label: Amoeba, New Rose, Thrill Jockey
- Producer: Eleventh Dream Day, Wink O'Bannon

Eleventh Dream Day chronology
Eleventh Dream Day (1987)	Prairie School Freakout (1988)	Beet (1989)

Prairie School Freakout is the second (and first full-length) album by Chicago-based band Eleventh Dream Day, originally released on Amoeba Records in 1988.

== Recording ==
According to the original liner notes, the album "was recorded on a hot pollution alert day during July [1987] in Louisville, Kentucky, and was made at a place called Artist Recording Service. We recorded 15 songs between 11:00 pm and 5:00 am, half of the time spent trying to fix the wild buzz coming out of Rick's amp. We finally gave up and decided to make amp buzz the theme of the record."

== Style and content ==
Neil Young & Crazy Horse, Dream Syndicate, X, Television and "the iconoclastic energy of the American hardcore-punk scene" were recognized by many as being influences on the album's sound. Comes with a Smile considers the album to be "the missing link between sprawling seventies rock and trim eighties post-punk". Pitchfork noted "an overabundance of post-adolescent fervor" in the music. Popmatters considers the album to be "perfect road fodder in its own inimitable way", noting driving-related themes in its lyrics and a similarly suggestive sound in the music (citing the track "Driving Song" as an example). Dusted writes that the "band's approach" is summed up in its opening track "Watching the Candles Burn": "dueling guitars that wildly alternate between a countryish strum and noisy, half-improvised solos; Rick Rizzo's amelodic, almost aggressive singing; a general sense of freewheeling, youthful energy."

== Release ==
The album was originally released through Amoeba Records in 1988. The New Rose Records CD release included "Tenth Leaving Train" as the last track. The album was re-released and expanded with the addition of the entire 3-song Wayne EP and videos for the tracks "Arsonist" (directed by Guy Roadruck for cable TV), "Watching the Candles Burn" and "Among the Pines" in 2003 by Thrill Jockey.

== Reception and legacy ==
Professional ratings
Review scores
Source	Rating
AllMusic	4/5 stars
The Encyclopedia of Popular Music	3/5 stars
The Great Alternative & Indie Discography	6/10
MusicHound Rock	4/5 stars
Ox-Fanzine	10/10
Pitchfork	7.8/10

The album received critical praise upon its release, eventually bringing the band to the attention of Atlantic Records.

Critic Greg Kot wrote of the album in 2003: "As a document of that era, "Prairie School Freakout" is both steeped in tradition (wearing influences from Crazy Horse to Patti Smith) and ahead of its time (prefiguring grunge and alternative rock)." Sean Westergaard of AllMusic wrote that while the band "went on to construct better overall albums [...] they never rocked harder than on Prairie School Freakout. This album smokes." Decrying their lack of success in comparison to their peers, Noel Gardner of Drowned in Sound wrote that the album "is a better record than anything The Flaming Lips, Yo La Tengo, Mercury Rev or Pavement – all similarly venerable, all vastly more bankable – have ever released." The Times called the album "one of those largely unknown records that deserves a second chance to find its place at the top of your list of all-time favourite albums." The album was similarly acclaimed by Trouser Press, who wrote sarcastically that it is "slightly more elegant than roadkill. Guitarists Rizzo and Baird Figi trade leads that could saw down a petrified forest; the lyrics, when decipherable through Rizzo's strangulations, depict lonesome roads, empty rooms and horror-film traumas filled with the same eerie dread as the original Texas Chainsaw Massacre." According to Jim DeRogatis, reviewing the reissues of Beet and Lived to Tell in 2001, Prairie School Freakout "remains the masterpiece" of the band's discography.

Spin named it one of the '80 Excellent Records of the 80s'. The music blog Fast n Bulbous ranked it the 10th greatest indie album of all time. Comedian Stewart Lee named it one of his 5 favorite albums from the 80s, praising its "perfect, shabby glory".

== Track listing ==
1. "Watching the Candles Burn" (Figi) – 4:01
2. "Sweet Smell" (Bean) – 4:37
3. "Coercion" (Bean) – 3:47
4. "Driving Song" (Figi) – 4:09
5. "Tarantula" (Rizzo) – 5:36
6. "Among the Pines" (Rizzo) – 6:24
7. "Through My Mouth" (McCombs) – 4:57
8. "Beach Miner" (Bean/Rizzo) – 3:42
9. "Death of Albert C. Sampson" (Bean) – 4:44
10. "Life on a String" (Rizzo) – 5:04
  Bonus tracks, from Wayne EP (1989)
11. "Tenth Leaving Train" (Rizzo) – 11:19
12. "Southern Pacific" (Neil Young) – 5:04
13. "Go" (Rizzo/Bean) – 4:50

== Personnel ==
Eleventh Day Dream

- Rick Rizzo – guitar, vocals
- Baird Figi – guitar, slide guitar
- Douglas McCombs – bass
- Janet Beveridge Bean – drums, vocals

Production

- Michael Franklin – engineer
- Wink O'Bannon – engineer
- Sheila Sachs – design
- Byron Coley – liner notes (2003 reissue)
