= Lived to Tell =

Studio album by Eleventh Dream Day
- Released: 1991
- Genre: Rock
- Label: Atlantic
- Producer: Paul McKenna

Eleventh Dream Day chronology
Borscht (1990)	Lived to Tell (1991)	Two Sweeties (1992)

Lived to Tell is an album by the American alternative rock band Eleventh Dream Day, released in 1991. Like the band's other two Atlantic Records albums, Lived to Tell was a commercial disappointment. The band supported the album with a North American tour.

== Production ==
Produced by Paul McKenna, the album was recorded in Cub Run, Kentucky, in a studio that had been built in an old barn. All four band members contributed to the songwriting.

== Critical reception ==
Professional ratings
Review scores
Source	Rating
AllMusic	4.5/5 stars
Austin American-Statesman	3.5/4 stars
Calgary Herald	B+
Robert Christgau	A−
The Encyclopedia of Popular Music	3/5 stars
Entertainment Weekly	B
MusicHound Rock: The Essential Album Guide	3/5 stars
The Rolling Stone Album Guide	3/5 stars

Entertainment Weekly wrote that the band "sport a wild instrumental attack, oblique lyrics, and a sturdy, unflinching belief in the healing effects of a silky, soaring guitar." Robert Christgau thought that "a notable guitar sound evolves into an undeniable band sound, roots/trad sonics (steel and slide under lead) and rhythms (buried hints of r&b strut and shuffle) just barely keeping their balance." Trouser Press opined that some songs "waver instead of stampede; for the first time, the band seems to know where they’re going, and that takes some joy out of the ride."

The New York Times wrote: "When the tempos are fast and the guitarists strum at top speed, the songs emerge in a passionate rush. But when songs grow more leisurely, collegiate pretensions emerge; songs called 'Daedalus' and 'It's All a Game' are just the clichés their titles promise." The Chicago Tribune deemed Lived to Tell "an album that ranks as one of the best ever made by a Chicago band." The Boston Globe concluded that "the band's cleverly oblique lyrics are often lost in the guitar din, but for pure energy, you won't find a hotter new band."

AllMusic wrote that "[Rick] Rizzo and Beveridge Bean make a fantastic pair of front singers, strong without being overbearing, on joint harmonies hitting something not far off from the brilliant combination of X's John Doe and Exene Cervenka."

== Track listing ==
No.	Title	Length
1.	"Rose of Jericho"	3:42
2.	"Dream of a Sleeping Sheep"	3:15
3.	"I Could Be Lost"	3:38
4.	"It's Not My World"	4:58
5.	"You Know What It Is"	3:41
6.	"Frozen Mile"	4:22
7.	"Strung Up and/or Out"	3:14
8.	"North of Wasteland"	3:16
9.	"It's All a Game"	4:32
10.	"Trouble"	2:41
11.	"There's This Thing"	4:00
12.	"Daedalus"	3:41
13.	"Angels Spread Your Wings"	2:54

== Personnel ==
Eleventh Dream Day

- Rick Rizzo – vocals, guitar, acoustic guitar, harmonica
- Janet Beveridge Bean – vocals, drums, photography
- Baird Figi – guitar, slide guitar, lap steel guitar
- Douglas McCombs – bass

Additional musicians

- Marshall Bradley Wood III – tenor sax ("There's This Thing")
- David Foster – calliope and cello ("Daedelus")

Production

- Paul McKenna – producer, engineer, mixer
- Kathleen Marie Yore – assistant engineer
- Craig Doubet – assistant mixing engineer
- Dennis King – mastering
- Bob Defrin – art direction
- Catherine Ann Irwin – cover painting
- Robert Miller – back cover photography
