= Beet (album) =

Studio album by Eleventh Dream Day
- Released: November 1989
- Recorded: June 1989
- Genre: Rock
- Length: 43:58
- Label: Atlantic
- Producer: Gary Waleik

Eleventh Dream Day chronology
| Prairie School Freakout (1988) | Beet (1989) | Borscht (1990) |

Beet is the second full-length album by Chicago, Illinois rock band Eleventh Dream Day and their first on a major label, Atlantic Records.

== Critical reception ==
Professional ratings
Review scores
| Source | Rating |
|---|---|
| AllMusic | 3.5/5 stars |
| Chicago Sun-Times | 3.5/4 stars |
| Robert Christgau | C+ |
| The Great Alternative & Indie Discography | 6/10 |
| MusicHound Rock: The Essential Album Guide | 3.5/5 stars |
| Rolling Stone | 3/5 stars |

Chicago Reader wrote: "Beet, recorded over a leisurely four days, is a hoot. Lissome guitar lines float in and amongst varying degrees of thunder riffing; Rizzo's voice flails wildly above the mix."

== Track listing ==
1. "Between Here and There" (Baird Figi, Rick Rizzo) - 4:45
2. "Testify" (Rizzo) - 4:03
3. "Bagdad's Last Ride" (Janet Beveridge Bean) - 4:04
4. "Awake I Lie" (Rizzo) - 5:20
5. "Road That Never Winds" (Rizzo) - 3:22
6. "Axle" (Rizzo) - 3:42
7. "Michael Dunne" (Figi, Rizzo) - 3:28
8. "Bomb the Mars Hotel" (Figi) - 3:32
9. "Teenage Pin Queen" (Rizzo) - 3:58
10. "Love to Hate to Love" (Rizzo) - 3:31
11. "Go (Slight Return)" (Bean, Rizzo) - 4:06
  Bonus tracks
12. "Seiche" (Figi) - 3:07 On CD only

== Personnel ==
- Janet Beveridge Bean – piano, drums, vocals
- Baird Figi – guitar, background vocals, lap steel guitar
- Douglas McCombs – bass, background vocals
- Rick Rizzo – guitar, vocals
