= Wicker Park, Chicago =

Neighborhood in Illinois, US

Coordinates: 41°54′27″N 87°40′37″W

- Wicker Park Historic District
- U.S. National Register of Historic Places
- U.S. Historic district
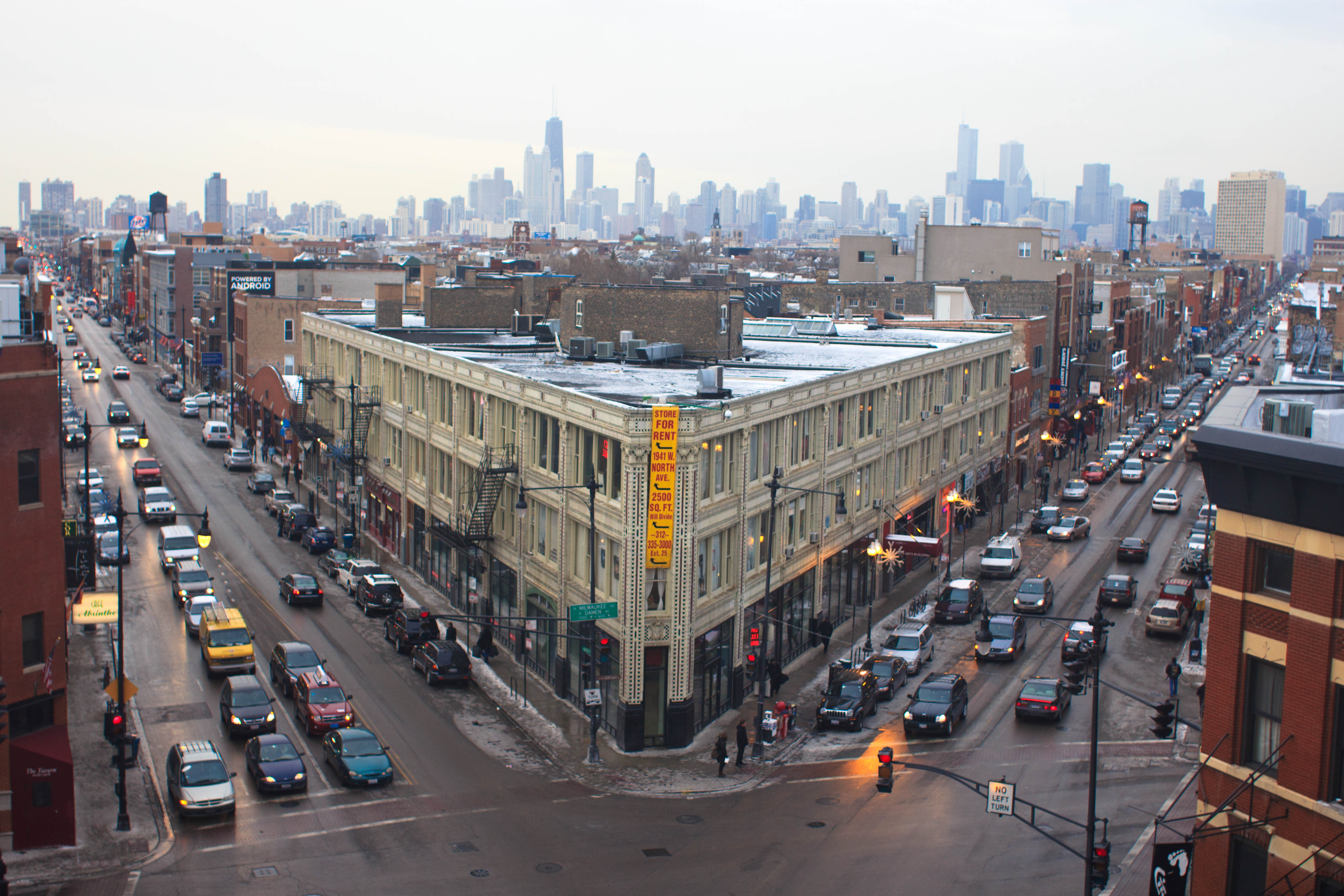
- View of Milwaukee Avenue and North Avenue in Wicker Park, with downtown Chicago in the background

- Location within Chicago metropolitan area Location within Illinois
- Location: Roughly bounded by Wood, Crystal and N. Caton Sts., Claremont and North Aves., Chicago, Illinois
- Area: 166 acres (67 ha)
- Architect: Multiple
- Architectural style: Italianate, Queen Anne, Romanesque
- NRHP reference No.: 79000831
- Added to NRHP: June 20, 1979

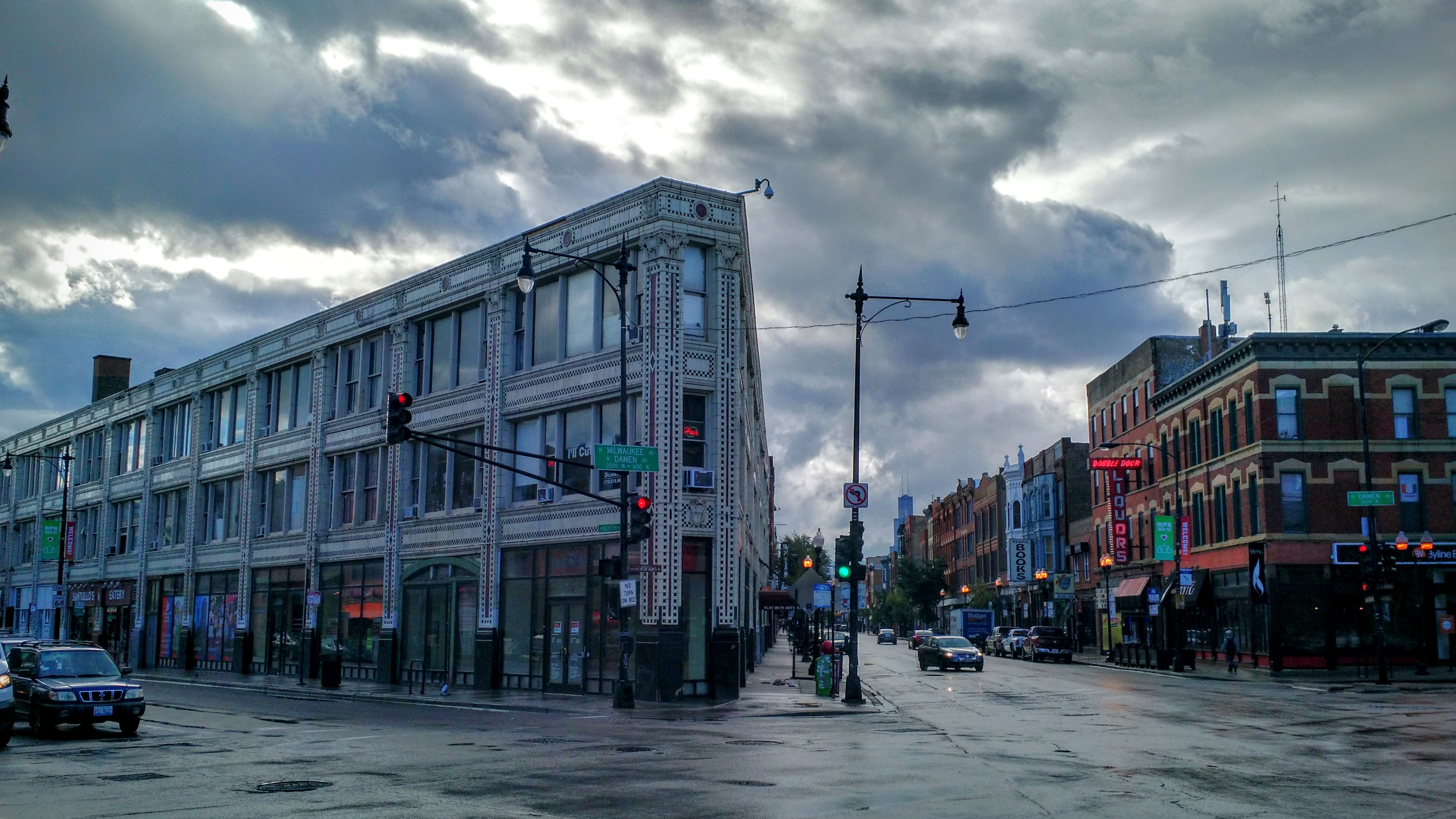
View of Milwaukee Avenue in Wicker Park

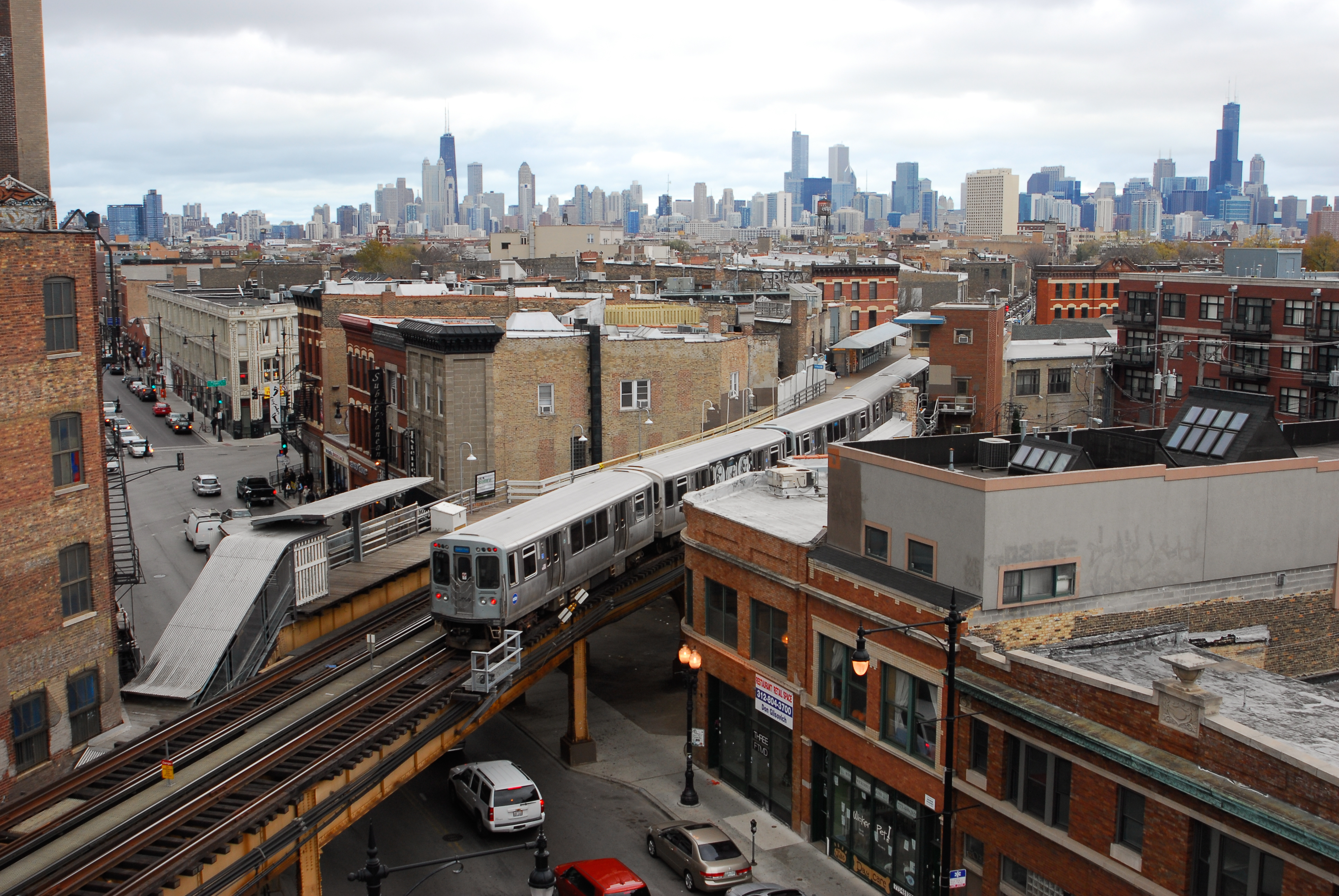
Wicker Park, Chicago

Wicker Park is a neighborhood in the West Town community area of the West Side of Chicago, Illinois, United States, west of the Kennedy Expressway, east of Humboldt Park, and south of the Bloomingdale Trail, known for its nightlife and food scene.

Wicker Park has seen real estate and commercial development, particularly along the CTA Blue Line subway. It is home to many luxury boutique shops and several flagship retail stores. Within the 60622 zip code, Wicker Park is home to some of Chicago's most expensive real estate with median home prices over $550,000.

== Geography ==
The neighborhood is northwest of The Loop, north of East Village and Ukrainian Village, east of Humboldt Park, and south of Bucktown. The 4-acre Chicago Park District Wicker Park is an outdoor gathering place in the neighborhood.

The borders of the Wicker Park neighborhood are generally accepted to be the Bloomingdale Trail (also known as the 606) to the north (~coordinate 1800 North), although historically it has ranged as far north as Armitage (~coordinate 2000 N) at times, Ashland Avenue to the east (~coordinate 1600 W), Division to the south (~coordinate 1200 N), and Western Avenue to the west (~coordinate 2400 W).

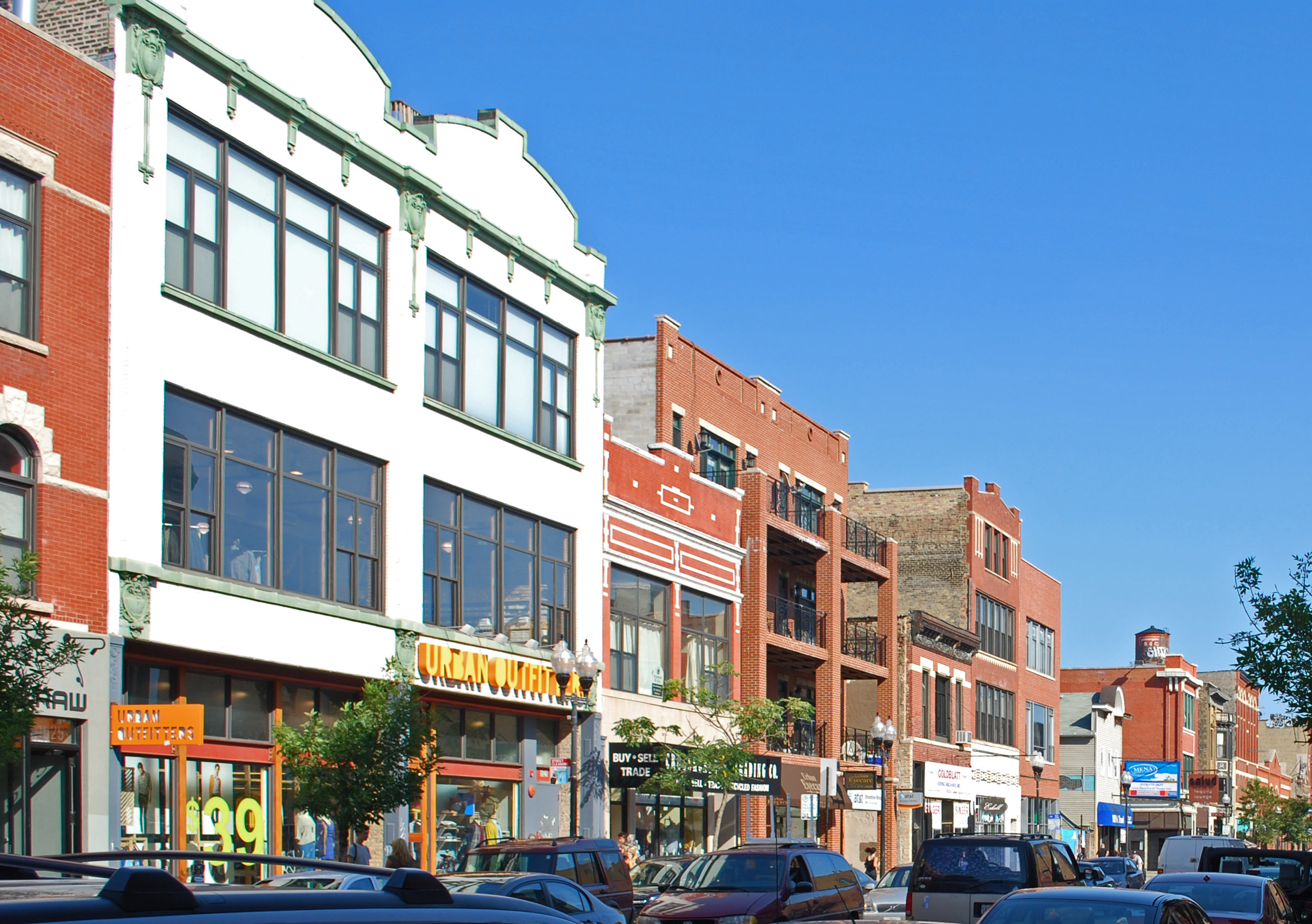
Wicker Park Historic District.

The Wicker Park Historic District is on the National Register of Historic Places listings in Chicago. Much of Wicker Park was also designated as a Chicago Landmark District.

== History ==
=== 19th century ===
In late 1868, the Chicago Board of Public Works announced the desire to build a park "lying west of Milwaukee avenue and south of North avenue. The grounds are of considerable capacity and are laid out in a tasteful and attractive manner as a park." Present at the meeting was alderman Charles Wicker, who, with his brother Joel, purchased 80 acres (32 ha) of land along Milwaukee Avenue in 1870 and laid out a subdivision with a mix of lot sizes surrounding a 4-acre (1.6 ha) park. The Great Chicago Fire of 1871 spurred the first wave of development, as homeless Chicagoans looked to build new houses.

Before the end of the 19th century, Germans and Norwegians tended to live in the area's north and northwestern sections. Wicker Park became the abode of Chicago's wealthy Northern European immigrants. The district proved especially popular with merchants, who built large mansions along the neighborhood's choicest streets—particularly on Hoyne and Pierce, just southwest of North and Damen−known then as Robey. Hoyne was known then as "Beer Baron Row", as many of Chicago's wealthiest brewers built mansions there.

=== Turn of the century ===
With the end of the 19th century the area was subsumed into the surrounding Polish Downtown, being adjacent to Wicker Park, which gave the neighborhood its name, also became known as the "Polish Gold Coast". In the 1890s and 1900s, immigration from Poland and the completion of the Metropolitan West Side Elevated Lines greatly boosted the population density of West Town, especially in areas east of Wicker Park. The area around Division, Milwaukee, and Ashland was once known as "Kostkaville", and the intersection retains the names "Polonia Triangle − Polish Triangle" to the present day.

=== 20th century ===
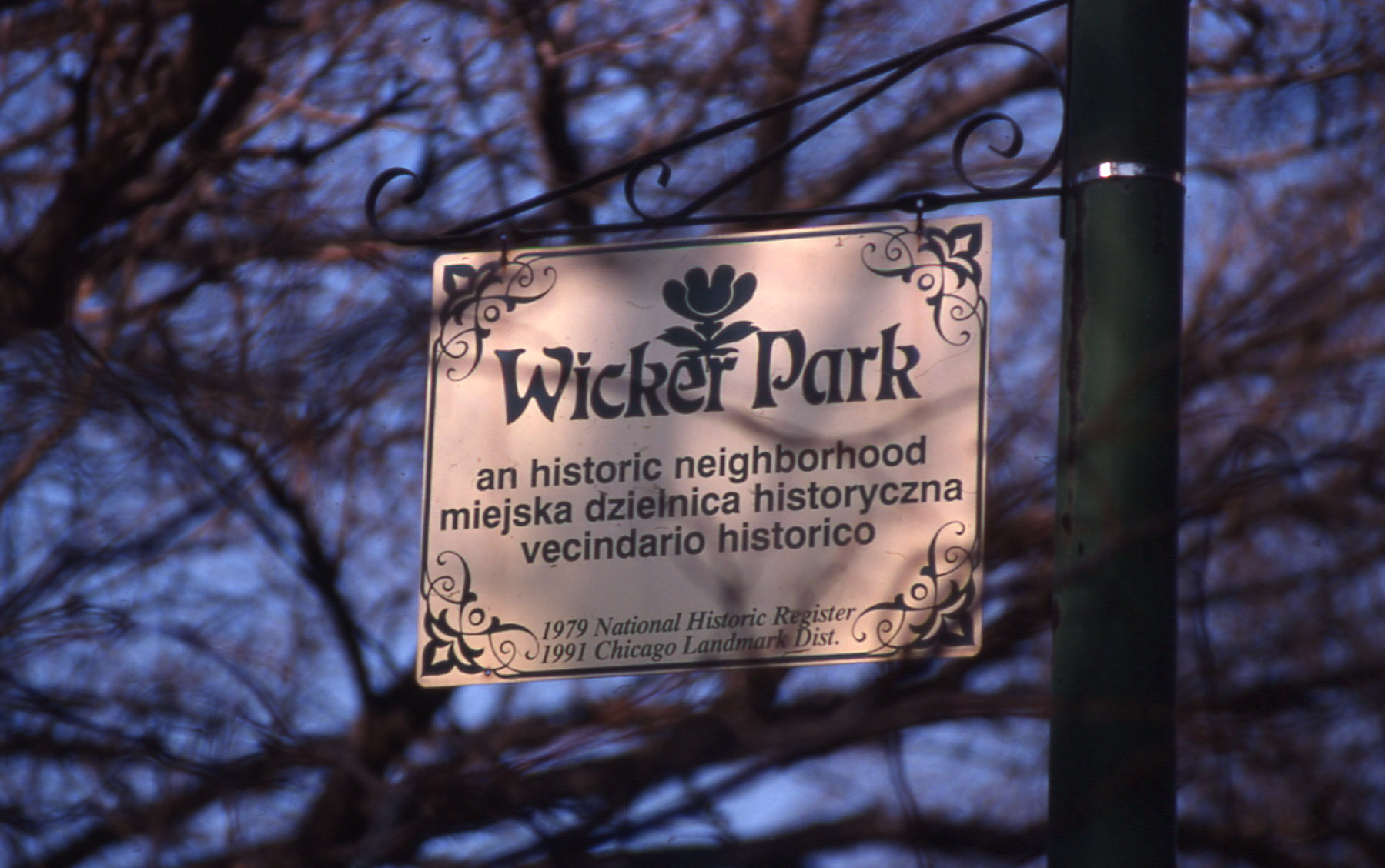
Wicker park sign in 1999

The provisional government of Poland met in Wicker Park during World War I. The near Northwest Side became home to many of the most opulent churches in the Archdiocese of Chicago, built in the Polish Cathedral style of Renaissance Revival and Baroque Revival architecture in the Eastern U.S.

==== 1930s–1950s ====
Polish immigration into the area accelerated during and after World War II when as many as 150,000 Poles are estimated to have arrived between 1939 and 1959 as displaced persons. Like the Ukrainians in neighboring Ukrainian Village, they clustered in established ethnic enclaves like this one that offered shops, restaurants, and banks where people spoke their language. Division Street was referred to as Polish Broadway. Poet John Guzlowski whose parents first came to the area as displaced persons commented on growing up in the area in the 1950s that "it felt like everyone was a Pole", a place where the local store owners, priests, cops, trash men, teachers, librarians all either spoke Polish or had family that did.

Nelson Algren's literary output lionized the Division Street strip in his books such as The Man with the Golden Arm and Never Come Morning focusing on the stories of junkies, gamblers, hookers, and drunks in some areas of that neighborhood. Writing about the area's Polish American underclass against the background of prevalent anti-immigrant xenophobia was taken by Poles as blatant Anti-Polonism and resulted in the book Never Come Morning being banned for decades from the Chicago Public Library system over the massive outcry by Chicago Polonia. Later controversies to commemorate Algren would bring these old wounds back to the surface, most recently when Polonia Triangle was to be renamed to honor the deceased author.

==== 1960s–1970s ====
Beginning in the 1960s, Wicker Park began to change radically. Construction of the Kennedy Expressway, completed in 1960, had displaced many residents and torn holes in the sustaining network of Polish-American churches, settlement houses, and neighborhood groups. Additionally Puerto Ricans and other Latinos displaced by urban renewal in Old Town and Lincoln Park began moving in. In 1960 Latinos comprised less than 1 percent of West Town's population, but by 1970 that number was up to 39 percent. Split from the Lincoln Park neighborhood by the Chicago River and then the Kennedy Expressway in the late 1950s and 60s, it contained the second largest concentration of Puerto Ricans in Chicago. It was the original home to the largest Latino gang at the time, the Latin Kings.

In June 1966, the Division Street riots broke out nearby, after police shot a Puerto Rican man in the leg, and set a dog on a man from the crowd that gathered. In the wake of the riots, the Latin American Defense Organization (LADO) was formed, and begun to work on issues related to welfare rights in Wicker Park. Members of LADO worked closely with the Young Lords, a leftist, Latin American organisation led by Jose Cha Cha Jimenez, which begun organising politically in nearby Lincoln Park in 1968. They worked with the Latin Kings and held sit-ins at the Wicker Park Welfare Office. They also led large nonviolent marches to city hall with the Spanish Action Committee.

Urban renewal projects were undertaken to combat "urban blight" in some parts of the neighborhood, but disinvestment continued at a rapid clip as downtown banks redlined West Town for much of the mid-20th century.

Wicker Park was also promoted by the city's urban renewal plans, as a good "suburb within the city" because of its easy access to downtown, via Milwaukee Avenue and the elevated train (via Damen and Division stations). Chicago and Wicker Park reached a nadir in the 1970s, a decade when the city overall lost 11% of its population. During the 1970s, hundreds of cases of insurance-motivated arson were reported in Wicker Park, near St. Elizabeth Hospital. Many small factories near the area (many in woodworking) also closed or moved away. The city increased building code enforcement and raised taxes. The shift from manufacturing to the new city-sponsored service economy also increased unemployment in the area and it was now in a downward decline. North Avenue between Western Avenue & Milwaukee Avenue became notorious for prostitution and drug dealers and gang crimes. The setting now became feasible for the neighborhood associations to organize land grab tours of real estate and speculators and developers saw a gold mine. The entire Puerto Rican Community along with other low income residents were displaced.

==== 1980s–1990s ====
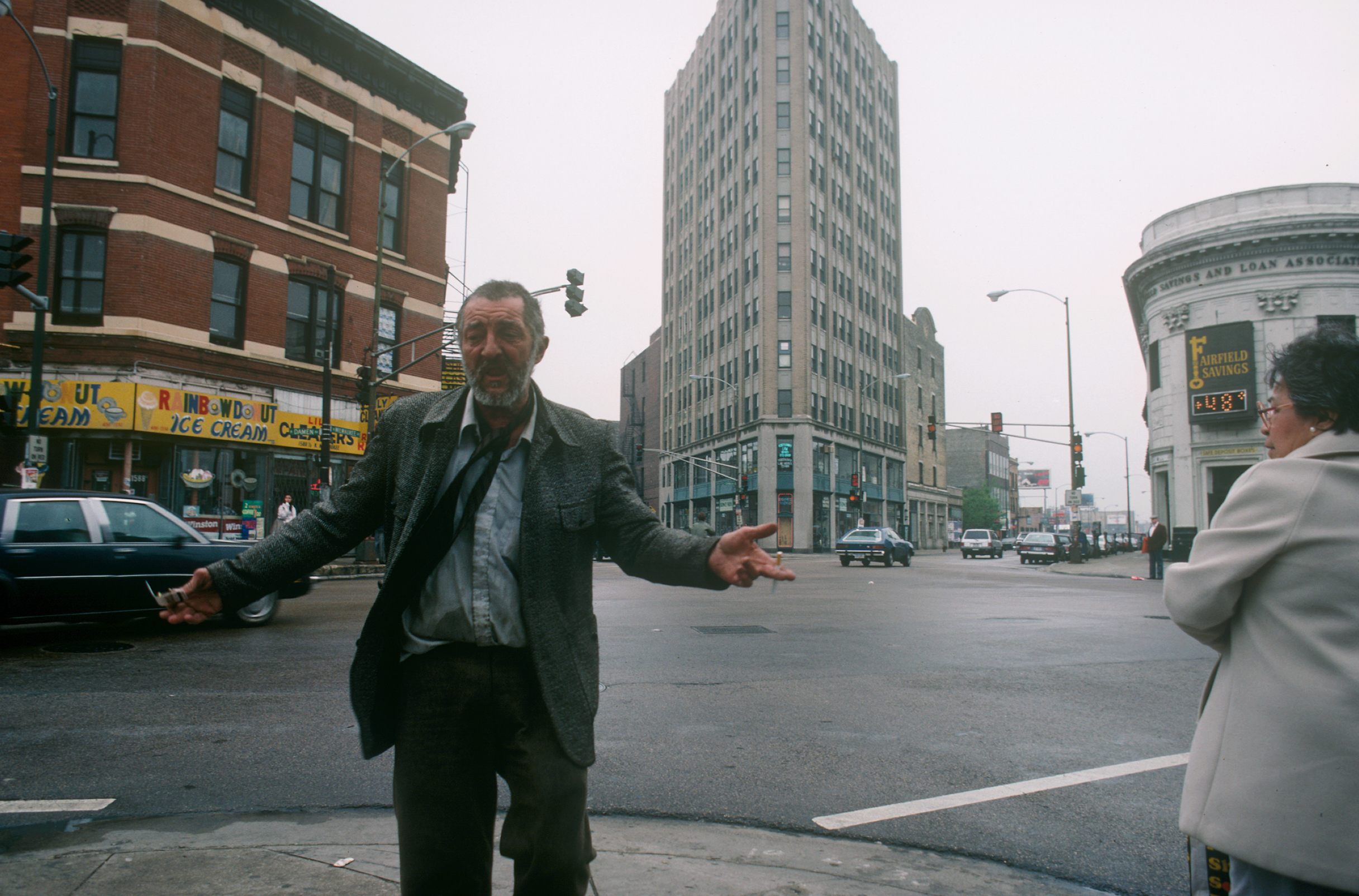
Milwaukee, North, and Damen in May 1988.

Efforts by community development groups like Northwest Community Organization (NCO) to stabilize the community through new affordable-housing construction in the 1980s coincided with the arrival of artists attracted by the neighborhood's easy access to the Loop, cheap loft space in the abandoned factories, and distinctly urban feel.

In 1989, the "Around the Coyote" festival was launched to help the hundreds of working artists and micro-galleries in the neighborhood to gain a level of local and international prominence. This 501(c)3 non-profit was established with the mission to "bring to the art community a professional organization that will help artists network and exhibit their art." For decades, the festival centered on the Flatiron Arts Building and was typically held during the month of October, Chicago's Artist Month. In 2008 "Around the Coyote" moved downtown and was renamed Looptopia. The presence of local artists also declined in the area, many moved to other art communities in Pilsen, Humboldt Park, Logan Square, Jefferson Park, Rogers Park, and Uptown.

=== 21st century ===
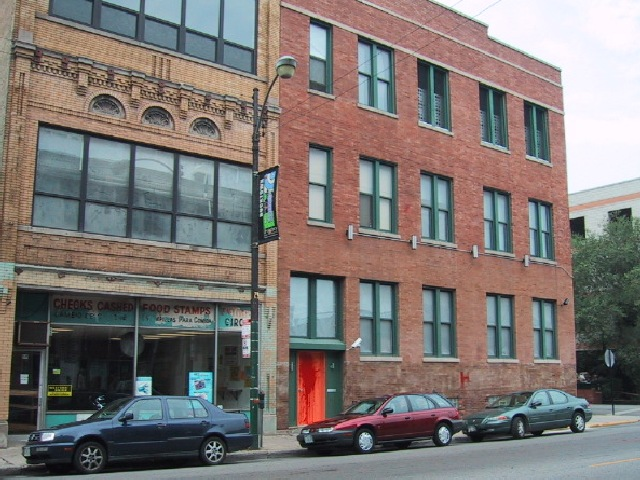
The Real World: Chicago residence on July 16, 2001, note the vandalism (red paint on the door) and street-level brick that has been worn due to graffiti and its continued removal due to protests against perceived gentrification that the show promulgated.

The present day neighborhood is best known for its numerous commercial and entertainment establishments, and being a convenient place to live for downtown workers due to its proximity to public transportation and The Loop. In 2001, MTV's reality TV show The Real World: Chicago was also staged in Wicker Park, which caused protests due to perceived promotion of gentrification. In the past two decades crime has decreased and many new homes have been built as well as older homes being restored, leading to increased business activity. The neighborhood is extremely trendy known for hosting emerging bands, high fashion boutiques, cutting-edge gourmet restaurants and bakeries, European-style cafes, upscale independent grocers, and artsy businesses.

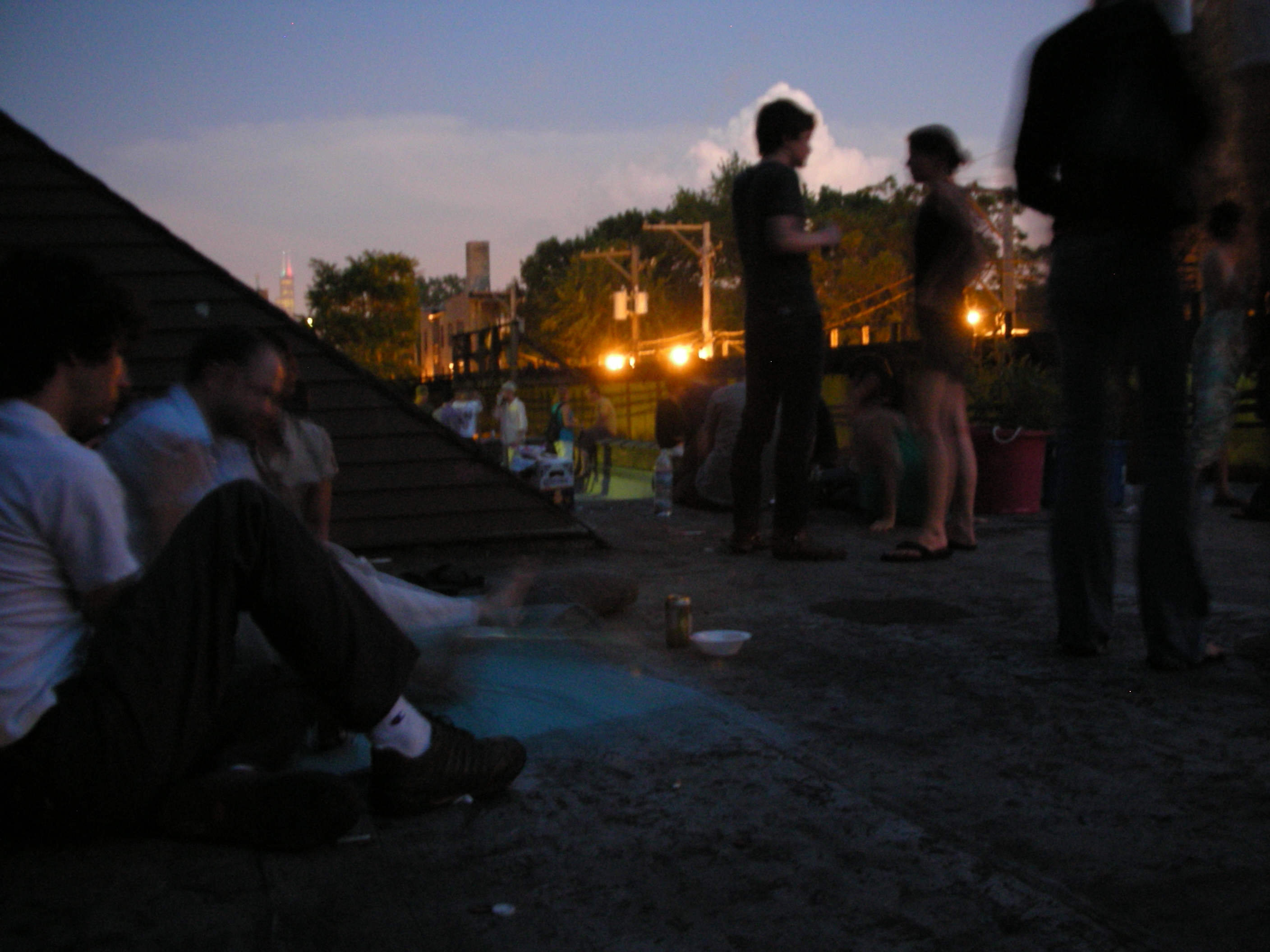
Rooftop art gallery party near El tracks in 2007, Sears Tower visible in background

In a September 2012 Forbes article, Wicker Park was named the #4 hippest hipster neighborhood in the country.

Wicker Park, along with other nearby West Town neighborhoods, has seen rising property values and increasing tax rates, increasing taxes levied by the city. In 2016 the city overall saw an average increase in taxes of 13%, when the city government raised the property tax rate and re-assessed housing values, however Wicker Park saw a 28.1% average increase. Nearby developments including the Bloomingdale Trail (otherwise known as The 606) have fueled an increase in property values and helped spur other large scale developments.

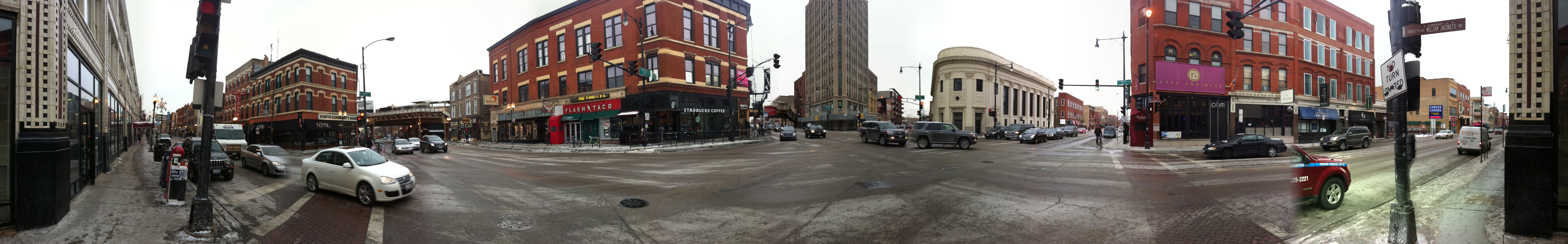
Panorama of the intersections of North, Damen, and Milwaukee Avenues in Wicker Park.

== Education ==
Wicker Park residents are zoned to various schools in the Chicago Public Schools district.

- A. N. Pritzker School, formerly the Wicker Park School, is a performing arts-magnets school in the neighborhood which serves elementary and middle school students. Additionally, Sabin Dual Language School and Lasalle II are also located in the neighborhood.
- Sabin Dual Language Magnet School is a dual language magnet school.
- Jonathan Burr Elementary School serves Kindergarten through 8th grade families.
- LaSalle II Magnet School is a magnet school modeled after LaSalle World Language Academy.

== Culture ==
=== Residents ===
Previous or established residents include:

- Nelson Algren, local author, lived on the 3rd floor of 1958 West Evergreen Avenue 1959–1975
- Colt Cabana, professional wrestler
- CM Punk, professional wrestler
- Hannibal Buress, comedian
- Carrie Coon and Tracy Letts, actors

Previous or established musicians who lived/worked or live/work in Wicker Park include:

- Liz Phair, singer-songwriter, penned her first album Exile in Guyville in Wicker Park
- James Iha, guitarist of the band Smashing Pumpkins
- Matt Skiba, singer/guitarist of The Alkaline Trio.
- Also: Wilco, Tim Kinsella, Archer Prewitt, The Sea and Cake, Joan of Arc (band), Mike Kinsella, Naked Raygun, Tortoise, Pegboy, Veruca Salt, Urge Overkill, Eleventh Dream Day, Trenchmouth, The Jesus Lizard, and Stephanie O'Brien.

=== Media ===
In 2001 a season of MTV's The Real World, named The Real World: Chicago, was filmed in Wicker Park. A protest grew, as residents of the neighborhood felt the exposure may lead to a quicker gentrification of the neighborhood. While the protest began somewhat tongue-in-cheek, it soon intensified and there were 11 arrests by the time the cast of the show left the city.

Wicker Park is the setting of the 2004 film of the same name. However, the filming of this movie was done on location in Montreal, Quebec. Another film of note, that used Wicker Park as its background, is High Fidelity (2000) directed by Stephen Frears and starring Evanston-born John Cusack.

In 2015, a portion of the Spike Lee movie Chiraq was being filmed at Double Door on Milwaukee in Wicker Park, including rapper actor Nick Cannon.

In 2016, the Chicago-based TV show Shameless filmed across Wicker Park. The NBC Chicago franchise including Chicago Fire, Chicago P.D., and Chicago Med often film in Wicker Park.

Milwaukee Avenue's Irazu Costa Rica Restaurant has been featured on PBS television's Check, Please!, Food Network's Diners, Drive-ins and Dives when Guy Fieri sampled several dishes, and Food Network's The Secret Life of Milkshakes. The burritos competed in ESPN's FiveThirtyEight's 2014 Burrito Bracket.

== See also ==
- Wicker Park (Chicago park)
- National Register of Historic Places listings in West Side Chicago
- Poles in Chicago
- Polish-American culture in Chicago−related topics
- Shuga Records
- West Town, Chicago
- Young Lords
- 1958 West North Avenue
