= Grand station (CTA Blue Line) =

Chicago "L" station

Grand 500N 800W
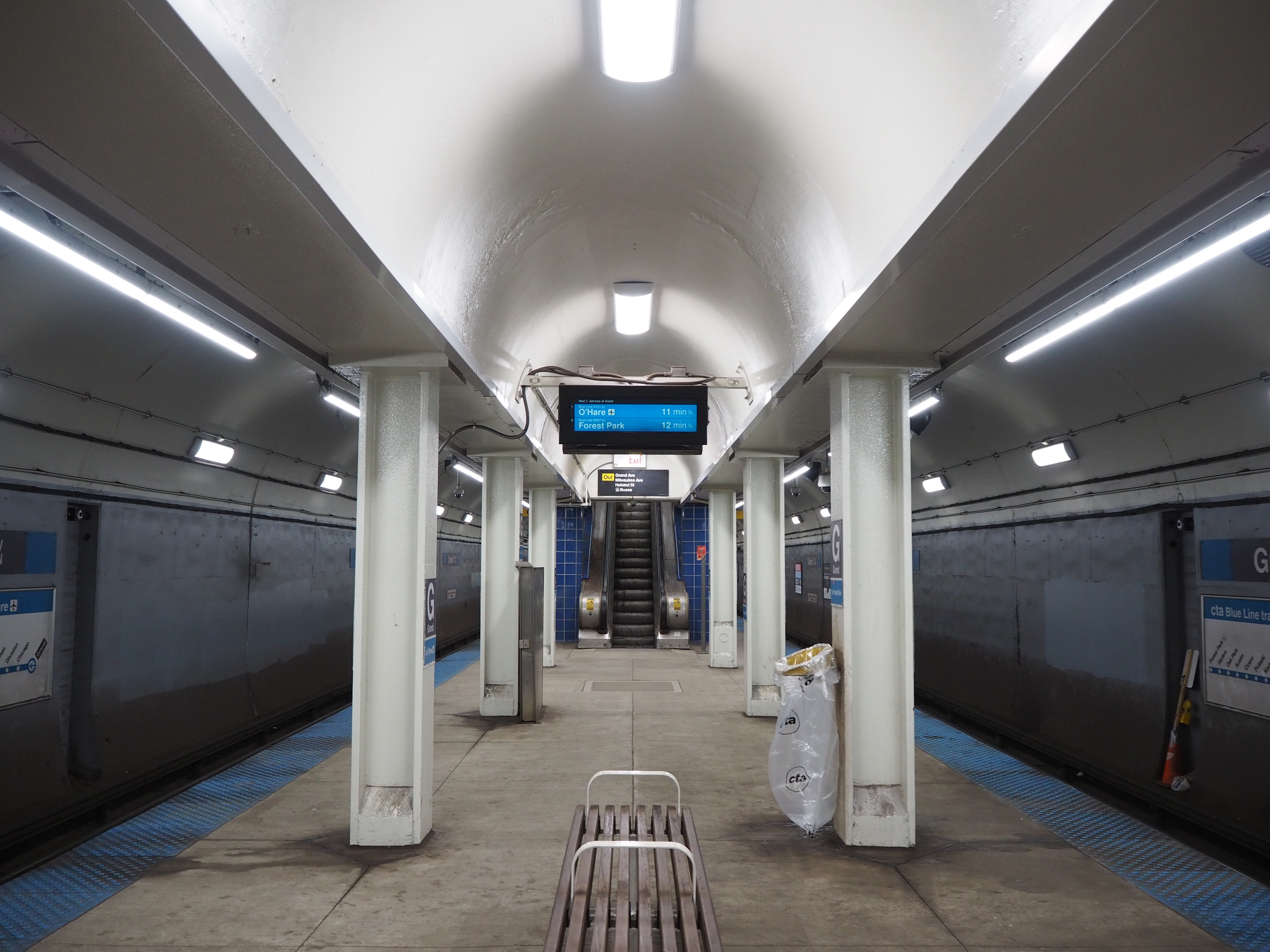

General information
- Location: 502 North Milwaukee Avenue; Chicago, Illinois 60622
- Coordinates: 41°53′28″N 87°38′51″W
- Owner: City of Chicago
- Line: Milwaukee–Dearborn subway
- Platforms: 1 island platform
- Tracks: 2

Construction
- Structure type: Subway
- Depth: 35 feet (11 m)
- Cycle facilities: Yes
- Accessible: No

History
- Opened: February 25, 1951; 75 years ago
- Closed: February 9, 1992; 34 years ago – June 25, 1999; 27 years ago
- Rebuilt: 2019–2020

Passengers
- 2025: 823,229 ▲24%

Services
Preceding station	Chicago "L"	Following station
Chicago toward O'Hare	Blue Line	Clark/Lake toward Forest Park
Track layout
Location

Grand, (Grand/Milwaukee in station announcements) is an 'L' station on the CTA's Blue Line, at Grand Avenue, Halsted Street and Milwaukee Avenue in the southeast corner of the West Town neighborhood. It is also located within the Fulton River District.

== History ==
Grand opened on February 25, 1951, as part of the Milwaukee-Dearborn subway. The Milwaukee-Dearborn subway was the second subway line in Chicago's Loop, since the State Street subway opened 8 years earlier in 1943.

=== Closure and Reopening ===
Starting in 1982, Grand was closed during night and weekend hours as a cost savings measure due to low ridership. By 1992, the station was only serving 850 passengers a day, and as a result, the CTA closed the station on February 9, 1992, due to its low ridership and a budget crisis. While the station was closed, the five stairways to the subway platform became garbage-strewn, and the station fell into disrepair. On April 21, 1999, the CTA decided to reopen Grand due to population growth in the area around the station. After some refurbishment, Grand reopened on June 25, 1999, at 6:00 a.m.

== Bus connections ==
CTA

- 8 Halsted
- 56 Milwaukee
- 65 Grand
