= Ursa Major (Eleventh Dream Day album) =

Studio album by Eleventh Dream Day
- Released: 1994
- Recorded: 1994
- Studios: Idful, Chicago, Illinois
- Label: Atavistic
- Producers: Brad Wood, John McEntire

Eleventh Dream Day chronology
El Moodio (1993)	Ursa Major (1994)	Eighth (1997)

Ursa Major is an album by the American band Eleventh Dream Day. Released in 1994, it was the band's first album for Atavistic Records. The band supported the album with shows in the Chicago area. "Orange Moon" was released as a single.

== Production ==
Originally planned as an EP, the album was produced by Brad Wood and John McEntire. It was recorded at Chicago's Idful Studios in March 1994. Bundy K. Brown and McEntire played on Ursa Major. Guitarist "Wink" O'Bannon left the band after the recording sessions. Opening track "History of Brokeback" is an instrumental.

== Critical reception ==
Professional ratings
Review scores
Source	Rating
AllMusic	3.5/5 stars
Chicago Tribune	4/4 stars
The Encyclopedia of Popular Music	3/5 stars
MusicHound Rock: The Essential Album Guide	4/5 stars
(The New) Rolling Stone Album Guide	2.5/5 stars

Trouser Press determined that the album "suffers greatly from a deliberate lack of pop songcraft, though it delivers on a series of textured, slowly unfolding axe workouts." The Chicago Tribune concluded that "this is music of sweeping atmosphere and drama, and also crushing delicacy, an extended meditation on love, commerce and betrayal"; the paper later listed it as the ninth best album of 1994. The Northwest Herald wrote that "Doug McComb's silky bass has become so integral to EDD's sound that it seems like a lead guitar." The Courier Journal praised the "certain level of dark intensity."

AllMusic considered the album "loaded with supple, pretty melodies and intense, rampaging guitars." (The New) Rolling Stone Album Guide noted the "strong, unhurried rhythm section and clear melodic patterns on guitar."

== Track listing ==
No.	Title	Writer(s)	Length
1.	"History of Brokeback"	Douglas A. McCombs	4:22
2.	"Occupation or Not"	Joseph R. Rizzo	5:31
3.	"Flutter"	Janet Beveridge Bean	3:48
4.	"Orange Moon"	Rizzo	5:25
5.	"Taking Leave"	Rizzo	6:36
6.	"Bearish on High"	Rizzo	3:26
7.	"Nova Zembla"	Bean, McCombs, Rizzo	2:11
8.	"The Blindside"	Rizzo	6:20
9.	"Exit Right"	Rizzo	5:51

== Personnel ==
Eleventh Day Dream

- Rick Rizzo – guitar, vocals
- Janet Beveridge Bean – drums, vocals, guitar, percussion
- Matthew "Wink" O'Bannon – guitar
- Douglas McCombs – bass, guitar

Additional musicians

- Popahna Brandes – cello
- John McEntire – drums, percussion, Putney synthesizer
- Bundy K. Brown – guitar

Production

- John McEntire – recording
- Brad Wood – mixing
