= Eighth (album) =

Studio album by Eleventh Dream Day
- Released: 1997
- Genre: Rock
- Label: Thrill Jockey
- Producer: John McEntire, Casey Rice

Eleventh Dream Day chronology
Ursa Major (1994)	Eighth (1997)	Stalled Parade (2000)

Eighth is an album by the American band Eleventh Dream Day, released in 1997. The band supported it with a North American tour that included shows with Tortoise.

== Production ==
Coproduced by John McEntire, the album was recorded in the band's hometown of Chicago. Eleventh Dream Day considered themselves a part-time entity at this point in their career; they had a small recording budget, rehearsed the songs only a couple of times, and were unconcerned about whether they could reproduce them in a live setting. Frontman Rick Rizzo wrote, sang lead, and played guitar on all of the songs, which the band either quickly worked out in the studio or abandoned. Drummer Janet Beveridge Bean used a click track for the first time on an album. "Motion Sickness" is an instrumental.

== Critical reception ==
Professional ratings
Review scores
Source	Rating
All Music Guide to Rock	5/5 stars
Chicago Tribune	3/4 stars
The Encyclopedia of Popular Music	4/5 stars
The Great Alternative & Indie Discography	7/10
MusicHound Rock: The Essential Album Guide	3.5/5 stars
(The New) Rolling Stone Album Guide	3/5 stars
NME	8/10

The Chicago Tribune said that the album "unfolds in slow motion, the subtle use of electronics thickening the texture on 'For a King' before Bean's voice emerges like a beacon out of the fog." The Boston Phoenix noted that "the unspoken fear that haunts Eighth is the band's fear of finding themselves in the same position as the characters they've sung about, the fear of being left on the margins without the energy to push against them." The Sunday Times stated that "the band's old sound turns inside out, with cyclical jazzy keyboards and dubby effects burying Rizzo's incendiary guitar in the mix."

Rolling Stone said that the album "bursts with quiet intensity, achieving a compelling synthesis of the band's penchant for experimentation and its gift for kick-ass rock & roll." Greil Marcus opined that the band pursues "a realism beyond the reach or perhaps even the desire of anyone else currently making pop records". The Chicago Sun-Times considered Eighth to be Eleventh Dream Day's best album. The Fort Worth Star-Telegram listed it among the 10 best albums of 1997.

== Track listing ==
No.	Title	Writer(s)	Length
1.	"For a King"	Joseph R. Rizzo	7:58
2.	"Writes a Letter Home"	Douglas A. McCombs	4:20
3.	"Two Smart Cookies"	Rizzo	3:42
4.	"Insomnia"	Rizzo	5:25
5.	"View from the Rim"	Rizzo	5:10
6.	"April"	Rizzo	6:07
7.	"Motion Sickness"	Rizzo	5:06
8.	"Last Call"	Rizzo	4:52

== Personnel ==
Eleventh Day Dream

- Rick Rizzo – guitar, vocals
- Douglas McCombs – bass, guitar
- Janet Beveridge Bean – drums, vocals, guitar, percussion

Additiona personnel

- John McEntire – recording, mixing, musical assistance
- Casey Rice – additional recording, musical assistance
- Bob Egan – musical assistance
- Deanna Varagona – musical assistance
- Wesley Kimler – paintings
- Sheila Sachs – layout
