= El Moodio =

Studio album by Eleventh Dream Day
- Released: 1993
- Studio: Sorcerer Sound
- Label: Atlantic
- Producer: Jim Rondinelli

Eleventh Dream Day chronology
Two Sweeties (1992)	El Moodio (1993)	Ursa Major (1994)

El Moodio is an album by the American band Eleventh Dream Day, released in 1993. The band supported the album with a North American tour. It was Eleventh Dream Day's final album for Atlantic Records.

== Production ==
Recorded in New York, the album was produced by Jim Rondinelli. Nine of its 10 songs were written by Janet Beveridge Bean and Rick Rizzo. Matthew O'Bannon joined as the second guitar player. The band started the album with Brad Wood, in Chicago, and also recorded songs that were released on 2013's New Moodio. Velvet Crush's Ric Menck played drums on "That's the Point".

== Critical reception ==
Professional ratings
Review scores
Source	Rating
AllMusic	4/5 stars
Calgary Herald	B+
Robert Christgau	(3-star Honorable Mention)
The Encyclopedia of Popular Music	3/5 stars
Los Angeles Times	2.5/4 stars
MusicHound Rock: The Essential Album Guide	3.5/5 stars
Rolling Stone	3/5 stars
(The New) Rolling Stone Album Guide	2/5 stars

Rolling Stone concluded that "the lion's share of the material reveals a knack for emotionally charged scenes, underscored by Bean's brusque drums," writing that "the root of great rock & roll isn't originality but spirit—and Eleventh Dream Day has passion to burn." The Washington Post determined that the album "still doesn't unite the band's influences—the Velvet Underground, Neil Young and the Dream Syndicate, to name just a few—into a distinctive whole." Greil Marcus, in Artforum, wrote that "on 'Rubber Band', singer/guitarist Rick Rizzo asks the musical question, How far can a phrase be stretched before every trace of the meaning it began with is gone?, and doesn't answer it."

USA Today praised "the shimmery harmonies, grabby melodies and guitar-rock intensity." The Calgary Herald called the album "outsider rock that doesn't try to overthrow the system, that just wants to hang on and hope—and rock with a controlled rage." The Gazette opined that "when Rizzo and Matthew O'Bannon's guitars work alchemy in the ballads, the band approaches grandeur." The Virginian-Pilot deemed El Moodio "an album of moody, nervous guitars and edgy singing."

== Track listing ==
All tracks are written by Rick Rizzo, except where noted.

No.	Title	Writer(s)	Length
1.	"Makin' Like a Rug"	Janet Beveridge Bean, Rick Rizzo	3:41
2.	"Figure It Out"		5:10
3.	"After This Time Is Gone"	Bean, Rizzo	3:36
4.	"Murder"	Matthew O'Bannon	3:53
5.	"Honeyslide"		8:04
6.	"That's the Point"		3:44
7.	"Motherland"		4:30
8.	"The Raft"		6:43
9.	"Bend Bridge"		3:21
10.	"Rubberband"		5:21

== Personnel ==
Eleventh Dream Day

- Rick Rizzo – guitar, vocals
- Matthew O'Bannon – guitar, vocals
- Janet Beveridge Bean – drums, vocals
- Douglas McCombs – bass, bass VI, vocals

Other musicians

- Jim Rondinelli – Hammond B-3 organ (3, 9), tambourine
- Ric Menck – drums (6)
- Tara Key – guitar (8)

Production

- Jim Rondinelli – producer, engineer, mixing
- John Azelvander – assistant engineer
- Scott Hull – mastering
- Melanie Nissen – art direction
- Amy Guip – photography
- Frank Gargiulo – design
