= Chicago station (CTA Blue Line) =

Rapid transit station in Chicago

Chicago 800N 1132W
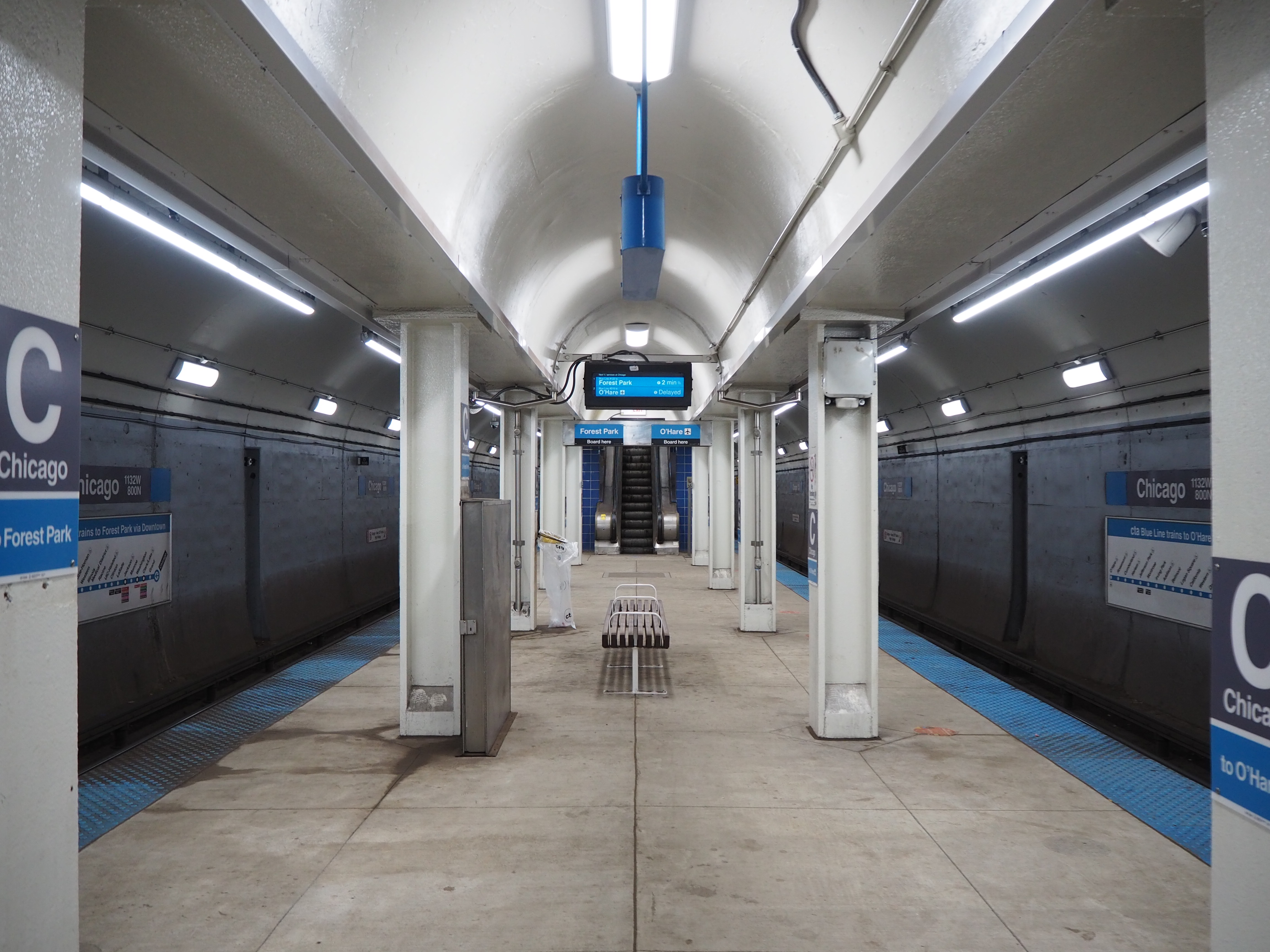

General information
- Location: 800 North Milwaukee Avenue; Chicago, Illinois 60622
- Coordinates: 41°53′46″N 87°39′19″W
- Owner: City of Chicago
- Line: Milwaukee–Dearborn subway
- Platforms: 1 island platform
- Tracks: 2

Construction
- Structure type: Subway
- Depth: 37 feet (11 m)
- Cycle facilities: Yes
- Accessible: No

History
- Opened: February 25, 1951; 75 years ago
- Rebuilt: 2019–2020; 6 years ago

Passengers
- 2025: 823,504 ▲4.7%

Services
Preceding station	Chicago "L"	Following station
Division toward O'Hare	Blue Line	Grand toward Forest Park
Track layout
Location

Chicago, (Chicago/Milwaukee in station announcements) is an 'L' station on the CTA's Blue Line. The station is located at the intersection of Chicago Avenue and Milwaukee Avenue in the West Town neighborhood of Chicago, Illinois. From the Chicago Avenue station, trains run at intervals of 2–7 minutes during rush hour, and take 4 minutes to travel to the Loop.

== Bus connections ==
CTA

- 56 Milwaukee
- 66 Chicago (Owl Service)
