= Wicker Park (film) =

2004 American film directed by Paul McGuigan

- Theatrical release poster
- Directed by: Paul McGuigan
- Screenplay by: Brandon Boyce
- Based on: L'Appartement by Gilles Mimouni
- Produced by: Andre Lamal; Marcus Viscidi; Tom Rosenberg; Gary Lucchesi
- Starring: Josh Hartnett; Rose Byrne; Matthew Lillard; Diane Kruger
- Cinematography: Peter Sova
- Edited by: Andrew Hulme
- Music by: Cliff Martinez
- Production companies: Metro-Goldwyn-Mayer; Lakeshore Entertainment
- Distributed by: MGM Distribution Co. (North America, France, Australia and New Zealand); Lakeshore Entertainment (International)
- Release date: September 3, 2004
- Running time: 114 minutes
- Country: United States
- Language: English
- Budget: $30 million
- Box office: $21.6 million

Wicker Park is a 2004 American romantic thriller drama film directed by Paul McGuigan and starring Josh Hartnett, Rose Byrne, Diane Kruger and Matthew Lillard.

It is a remake of the 1996 French film L'Appartement, which in turn is loosely based on Shakespeare's A Midsummer Night's Dream, and follows a young advertising executive who searches obsessively for his ex-lover after she disappeared two years earlier. It was nominated for the Grand Prix at the Montreal World Film Festival, the city in which the film was partially filmed. The title refers to the Wicker Park neighborhood on Chicago's near northwest side.

The film received generally negative reviews from critics, and was a box-office disappointment. Filmed on a budget of $30 million, Wicker Park grossed only $21.6 million worldwide.

On December 28, 2004, the movie was released on DVD and VHS from MGM Home Entertainment.

== Plot ==
Matt Simon, a young advertising executive, returns to Chicago with his fiancée Rebecca, after spending the last two years in New York. He bumps into his old friend Luke on the way into a meeting at a restaurant, in preparation for a business trip to China. Once inside, Matt thinks he overhears Lisa, the beautiful dancer he was in love with two years before, who had vanished overnight. Unable to confront the woman he believes may be Lisa, he blows off the trip and instead embarks on an obsessive search for her, as the story of Matt and Lisa's romance unfolds in flashbacks.

A key card which the woman leaves at the restaurant leads Matt to a hotel, where he finds Lisa's silver compact and an article marked in a newspaper. He leaves a note for Lisa at the restaurant bar, borrows Luke's car, and trails the man from the newspaper article to an apartment. There, Matt discovers a note to Lisa under the door, with her key enclosed. The apartment is deserted, but he leaves Lisa a note himself, to meet him in Wicker Park, and keeps the key. An ecstatic Matt returns the car to Luke, who is furious because he has missed a date with his new girlfriend Alex. When Alex calls, Matt takes the blame and Luke is mollified.

The next day, after waiting in vain at Wicker Park, Matt goes back to the apartment and is caught by a woman who is also named Lisa. She says the apartment is hers, but she has a coat and red-soled shoes with a broken heel identical to Lisa's—shoes that came from Luke's shop, where Lisa first met Matt. She says that she was at the hotel because the man in the newspaper was stalking her, and asks Matt to stay the night. They end up sleeping together. Flashbacks reveal that this "Lisa" is actually Alex, Lisa's old neighbor and friend. Alex had fallen in love with Matt from afar, but he met and fell for Lisa before Alex found the courage to speak to him. The man from the newspaper was stalking Lisa, and Alex agreed to swap apartments with her for a few days before Lisa left for a new job in London.

Luke persuades Matt to come with him that night to see Alex perform in Twelfth Night. She is unrecognizable in stage makeup, but panics after she sees Matt in the audience with Luke. Matt returns to the apartment, feels the real Lisa's presence in spite of its emptiness, and spends the night. Alex sleeps with Luke that night. In the morning, when Matt calls Luke, she answers the phone then drops it in a panic. She overhears Luke say Matt is at the apartment, and runs out to call him and meet him there. After receiving Matt's note at the restaurant, the real Lisa calls and asks Luke to tell Matt to meet her at three o'clock, saying he will know where. When Alex arrives at the apartment, Matt gives her another pair of red-soled shoes, Lisa's size, but they are too big. She realizes he suspects something, but Matt says he can exchange them and leaves. Alex then calls Luke and asks him to meet her at the restaurant.

Now suspicious, Matt follows "Lisa" (Alex), bumps into Luke, and follows him into the restaurant to finally meet Alex, the girl Luke is in love with. Matt confronts Alex, her deception revealed. A flashback reveals that two years ago, the same day that Matt asked Lisa to move in with him, Lisa was offered a last minute job touring with a show in Europe and had to jump on a plane. Lisa had given Alex a note to deliver to Matt, telling him she loved him and wanted to live with him. Instead, Alex had kept the note, deleted all the messages Lisa had left for Matt on his answering machine, and told Lisa that she had caught Matt in bed with another woman. Matt never learned why Lisa left, seemingly without a word. In the present, a confused Luke tells Matt that Lisa called and wants him to meet her at three o'clock before she returns to London. Matt is unsure where to meet, but Alex gives him Lisa's old note and he realizes that Lisa is at Wicker Park. Arriving too late, Matt then races to the airport, and is met by Rebecca, who has come to pick him up from the business trip to China he never went on. He confesses that he still loves someone else and cannot marry her. Lisa is nearby on the phone, listening to Alex admit what she has done and apologize. Matt sees Lisa through the crowd and comes up behind her. She senses he is there, turns to kiss him, and they are reunited.

== Cast ==
- Josh Hartnett as Matthew "Matt" Simon
- Rose Byrne as Alex Denver
- Diane Kruger as Lisa Parish
- Matthew Lillard as Luke Stanford
- Jessica Paré as Rebecca Martin
- Christopher Cousins as Daniel Ristelli

== Production ==
Calling L'Appartement "among the most absorbing and ingeniously constructed thrillers in years," Variety noted that the film "was tapped for a Hollywood redo almost immediately," but then went into development hell with multiple directors (Joel Schumacher, Steven Spielberg, Joan Chen and Danny Cannon) and stars (Brendan Fraser, Freddie Prinze Jr. and Paul Walker) attached at different times.

== Reception ==
=== Critical response ===
Wicker Park has been given 27% approval based on reviews from 137 critics from Rotten Tomatoes, with an average rating of 4.4 out of 10. The site's critics consensus reads: "Implausible coincidences and an overly convoluted structure make the movie hard to follow or believe." At Metacritic the film has a weighted average score of 40 out of 100, based on 26 critics, indicating "mixed or average reviews". Audiences polled by CinemaScore gave the film an average grade of "C+" on an A+ to F scale.

Main criticisms are directed towards the film's complex plot and unconvincingly implausible coincidences. The Associated Press says, "the characters do incredibly stupid things simply for the sake of plot contrivance." The Arizona Republic calls it "a film with more unbelievable coincidences than a Henry Fielding novel, more plot holes than a Swiss cheese and populated with the stock characters of that Hollywood world, that cinematic parallel universe." McGuigan's direction is also criticised, with the Denver Rocky Mountain News saying he "seems to have invested more in the youth and glamour of his cast than in a plausible and exacting script", whereas The New York Times says "Directorial touches can't do much to salvage a project as poorly conceived as this one."

Though calling the film inferior to L'Appartement, Scott Foundas wrote in Variety that both Wicker Park's directing and screenplay were faithful to the French original, praising the way the film's second half "jumps back and forth in time and shifts between various characters' points-of-view, until finally the disparate pieces of the pic's fragmented puzzle come together." He added, "And while cynical viewers will no doubt suggest that [the] pic's entire mystery could be remedied with a single e-mail or cell phone call, the same might be said for Vertigo, and there's something refreshing and timeless about the way Wicker Park allows its characters to rely on their own wits rather than those increasingly common technological aids."

The non-linear narrative received a mixed response. In a mixed review, The Boston Globe says, "The preview audience I saw it with hooted in disbelief at the outrageous bits, then happily dug in to see what would happen next." Conversely, The Washington Post says, "This is a smart movie, full of astonishing reverses and switchbacks, and it adroitly walks the thin line between too clever by half and not clever enough by three-quarters." In a favorable review, Roger Ebert says Wicker Park "works because the actors invest their scenes with what is, under the circumstances, astonishing emotional realism."

Wicker Park was nominated for the Grand Prix des Amériques at the Montreal World Film Festival, the city in which it was partially filmed.
