= Milwaukee Avenue (Chicago) =

Street in Illinois, United States

Coordinates: 41°53′20.7″N 87°38′39.6″W

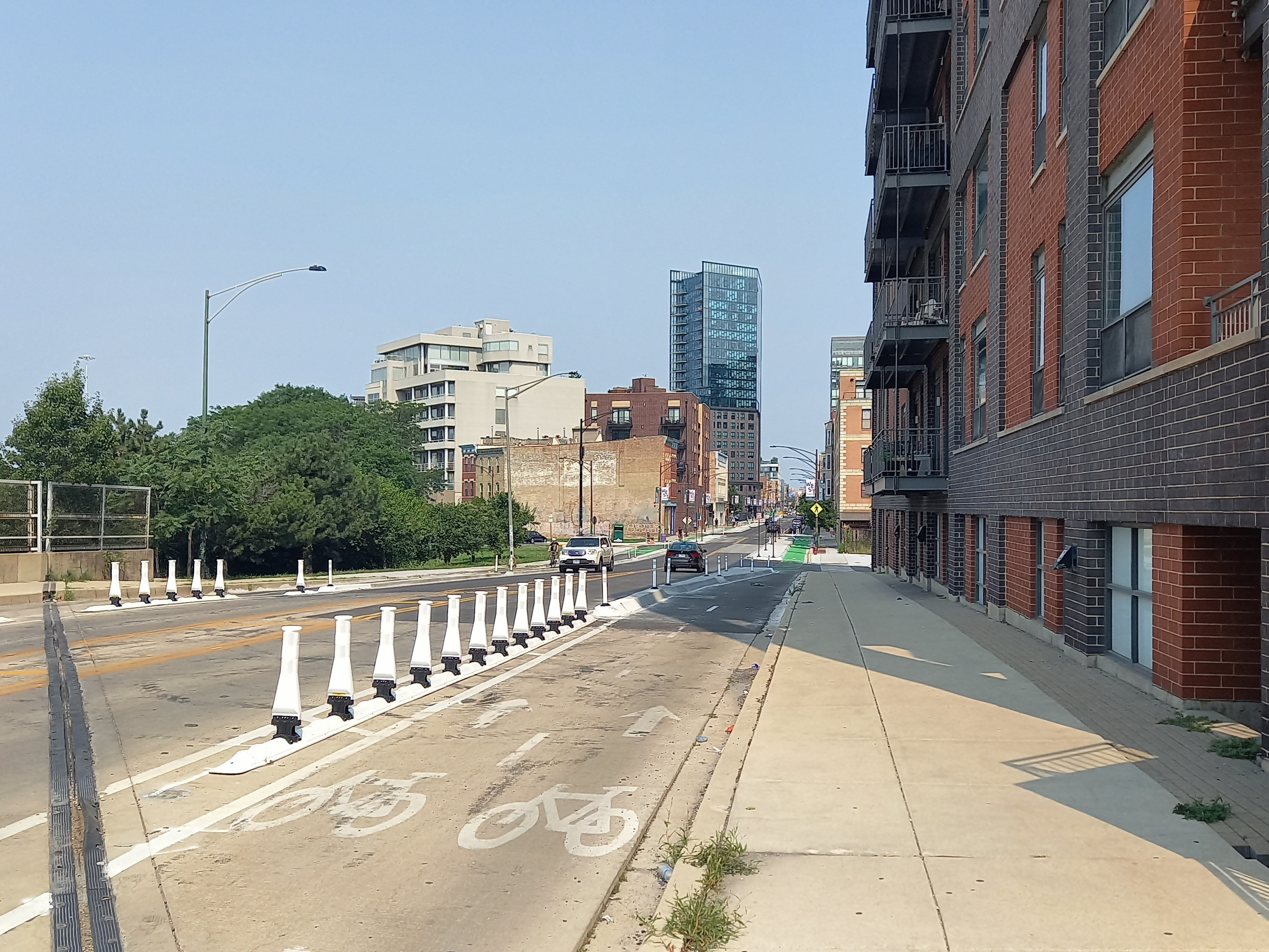
- Milwaukee Avenue north of Ohio Street
- Interactive map of Milwaukee Avenue
- Part of: US 45 / IL 21
- Location: Chicago area
- South end: Desplaines Street/Kinzie Street, Chicago
- North end: IL 132 (Grand Avenue) in Gurnee, Illinois

North Milwaukee Avenue is a street in the city of Chicago and the northern suburbs.

== Route description ==
True to its name, the street, which began as a Native American trail, eventually leads north to the state of Wisconsin and through Kenosha and Racine towards Milwaukee, though not directly. Starting with a short section at N. Canal and W. Lake Streets, it begins in earnest at the corner of N. Des Plaines and W. Kinzie Streets and heads northwest for about 40 miles (64 km), eventually following Illinois Route 21 before joining Skokie Highway (U.S. Route 41) in Gurnee, Illinois, which eventually merges at Interstate 94 where Skokie Highway and the Tri-State Tollway split off, continuing to Milwaukee. From Harlem Avenue to Riverside Drive, it is Illinois Route 21.

Milwaukee Avenue is a popular route for bicyclists. The southeastern end of Milwaukee Avenue is the most heavily bicycled stretch of road in Chicago, with cyclists accounting for 22% of all traffic there on a randomly selected day in September.

The CTA's Blue Line runs beneath and alongside Milwaukee Avenue from its beginning at Canal and Lake Streets out to Logan Boulevard, with stations at Grand Avenue, Chicago Avenue, Division Street, Damen Avenue (in the Wicker Park neighborhood), Western Avenue, California Avenue and Logan Square. The Kennedy Expressway (Interstate 90) roughly parallels Milwaukee Avenue as well.

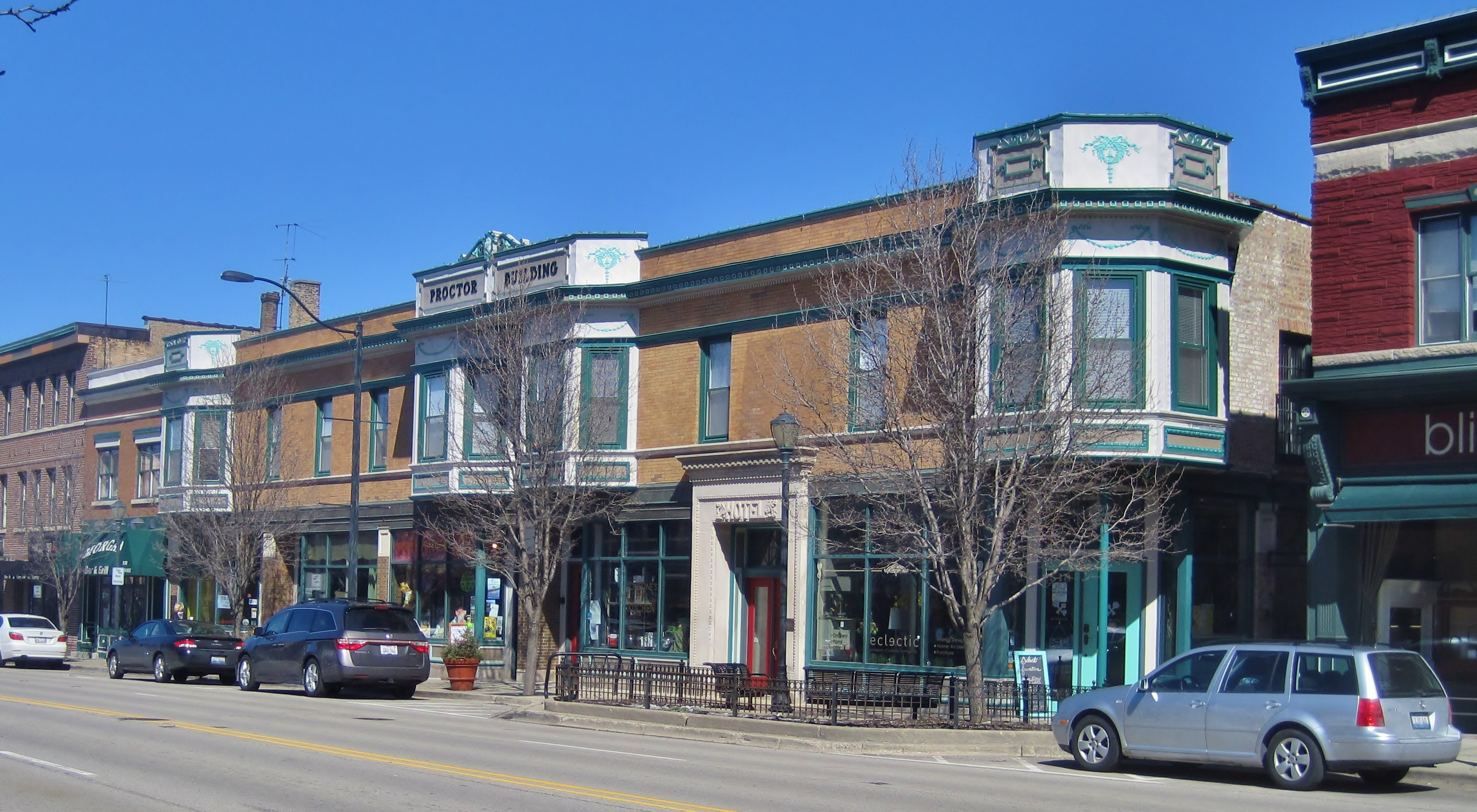
Milwaukee Avenue passing through downtown Libertyville

Just north of Armitage it passes the Chicago Landmark Congress Theater and at Addison Street it passes the Chicago Landmark Schurz High School. Past Irving Park Road it turns more northerly and the Blue Line crosses again at the Jefferson Park station passing the Gateway Theatre. It exits the city at about Albion Avenue and enters Niles, Illinois. A very brief stretch later reenters the Chicago city limits, located southwest of the intersection of Harlem & Howard avenues; the street is in Niles on either side of this stretch. At Golf Road it passes the Golf Mill Shopping Center. It crosses the Des Plaines River just south of the Chicago Executive Airport. From there it roughly follows the Des Plaines River north, passing through such communities as Wheeling, Lincolnshire, Vernon Hills, and Libertyville, where it forms the historic core of Libertyville's downtown area. It continues on past Gurnee before merging with the Skokie Highway near Wadsworth.

== Wicker Park ==
Milwaukee Avenue runs through the commercial heart of Chicago's vibrant and trendy Wicker Park and Bucktown neighborhoods. The Double Door theater and Irazu Costa Rica Restaurant front the avenue in this section. On an episode of Food Network's Diners, Drive-ins and Dives, host Guy Fieri walks from the Milwaukee Avenue pavement to Irazu's outdoor patio to sample the food for the TV audience.

Sections of the movie High Fidelity were filmed in buildings along Milwaukee Avenue, including the Double Door and the fictional record store that is the nexus of the character's lives. Although the movie Wicker Park was filmed in Canada, the story is set in this area of Wicker Park, Chicago. The busy six corner intersection of Damen Avenue, North Avenue, and Milwaukee is the center of the "24 hour" Wicker Park scene with dozens of bars and restaurants, making for popular nightlife. The Flat Iron Arts Center, built in 1913 and designed by Holabird & Roche, is sited at this intersection.

In 2015, the Spike Lee movie Chiraq was filmed in Chicago, with a scene including rapper actor Nick Cannon filmed at the Double Door on Milwaukee Avenue.

The former movie palace Congress Theater, a designated Chicago landmark built in 1926, is located at 2135 N. Milwaukee.

== Logan Square ==
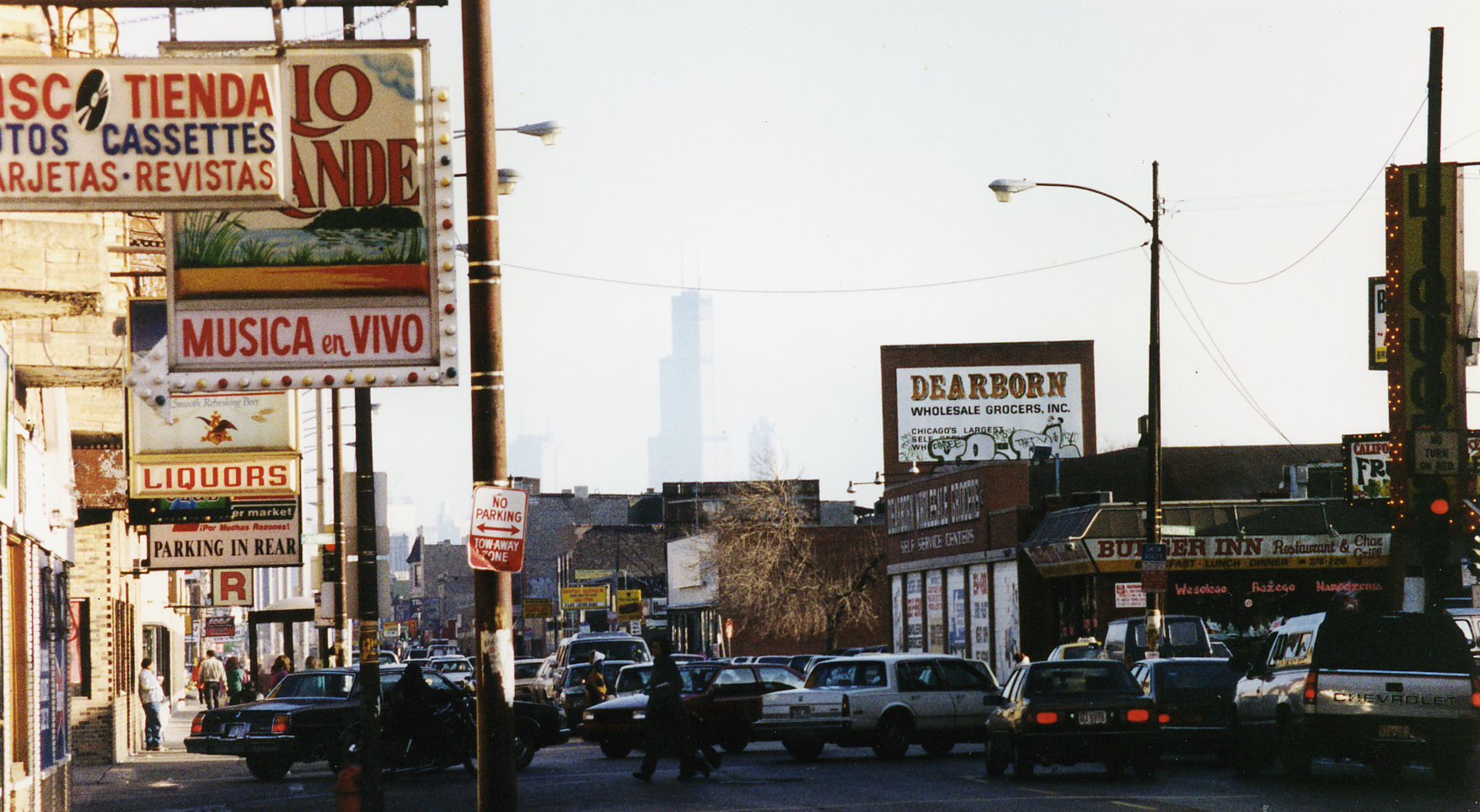
Logan Square in 1993

Just northwest of Bucktown, Milwaukee Avenue traverses the heart of Logan Square, Chicago. Milwaukee Avenue runs on a diagonal through the parkway of the boulevards, Logan Boulevard and Kedzie Avenue, connected by a traffic circle surrounding the Illinois Centennial Monument.

== Chicago's Polish Corridor ==
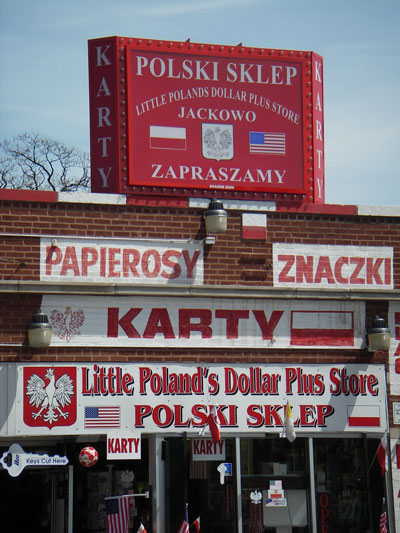
Polish store along Pulaski Rd. in Jackowo

While Milwaukee Avenue has been a route of chain migration for various ethnicities, it is particularly associated with Chicago's Poles who have dominated vast areas of the city which Milwaukee Avenue cuts through. Numerous Polish Patches dotted the cityscape in its vicinity, from Polish Downtown near Polonia Triangle through the Polish Village in Avondale and the adjacent Villa District which journalist Mike Royko christened as "Polish Kenilworth". The street was once used as part of the route for the Polish Constitution Day Parade as well as Pope John Paul II's 1979 visit to Chicago. Numerous Polish churches, shops, and cultural organizations such as the Copernicus Foundation, the Chopin Theatre, the Society for Arts, and the Polish Daily News still make their home along Milwaukee Avenue, continuing its Polish presence to the present day.

A stretch of Milwaukee Avenue in Niles, Illinois was renamed in honor of Wojciech Seweryn in 2011, the Chicago area artist who died in the plane crash that killed the Polish president and dozens of other Polish leaders in Smolensk, Russia.

== Transportation ==
The Blue Line parallels or runs underneath much of Milwaukee Avenue in Chicago. The following Blue Line stations are situated below or near the street: Grand, Chicago, Division, Damen, Western, California, Logan Square, and Jefferson Park stations. The last station is also served by Metra's Union Pacific Northwest Line. Another Metra line, the Milwaukee District North Line, connects to Milwaukee Avenue at Grayland and Libertyville stations.

A CTA bus route, 56 Milwaukee, complements this section of the Blue Line, running from Jefferson Park to Madison Street/Michigan Avenue via Milwaukee Avenue and the Loop Link.

Several Pace bus routes run primarily along Milwaukee Avenue: the Pulse Milwaukee Line from Jefferson Park to the Golf Mill Shopping Center, 270 Milwaukee Avenue from Jefferson Park to Glenbrook Hospital, and 272 Milwaukee Avenue North from Golf Mill to Hawthorn Mall.

== Major intersections ==
County	Location	mi	km	Destinations	Notes
Cook	Chicago	0.00	0.00	Kinzie Street / Desplaines Street	Southern terminus
Cook	Chicago	1.1	1.8	I-90 east / I-94 east (Kennedy Expressway)	I-94 west exit 49B
Cook	Chicago	2.3	3.7	IL 64 (North Avenue) / Damen Avenue	
Cook	Chicago	4.2	6.8	Logan Square	Also Goes to Kedzie Avenue and other roads
Cook	6.9	11.1	IL 50 (Cicero Avenue) / IL 19 (Irving Park Road)	Six Corners	
Cook	Niles	12.3	19.8	IL 43 (Harlem Avenue) / IL 21 begins	Southern end of IL 21 overlap; southern terminus of IL 21
Cook	Niles	14.2	22.9	US 14 (Dempster Street)	Interchange
Cook	Niles	15.3	24.6	IL 58 (Golf Road)	Site of Golf Mill Mall
Cook	Prospect Heights	19.6	31.5	US 45 south (North Des Plaines River Road)	Southern end of US 45 overlap
Cook	Prospect Heights	20.0	32.2	Willow Road east to Illinois Tollway (I-294)	Diamond interchange
Cook	Prospect Heights	20.0	32.2	Palatine Road west – Chicago Executive Airport Viewing Area	Diamond interchange
Wheeling	22.3	35.9	IL 68 (East Dundee Road)		
Cook–Lake county line	Wheeling–Buffalo Grove line	23.3	37.5	Lake Cook Road	Interchange
Lake	Lincolnshire	26.5	42.6	IL 22 (Half Day Road)	
Lake	Lincolnshire	26.8	43.1	US 45 north (Olde Half Day Road)	Northern end of US 45 overlap
Lake	Vernon Hills	29.5	47.5	IL 60 (East Townline Road)	
Lake	Libertyville	32.5	52.3	IL 176 (East Park Avenue)	
Lake	Libertyville	34.1	54.9	IL 137 (Buckley Road)	
Lake	Gurnee	37.0	59.5	IL 120 (Belvidere Road) to I-94 Toll east (Tri-State Tollway)	Interchange
Lake	Gurnee	38.1	61.3	I-94 Toll west (Tri-State Tollway) – Wisconsin	I-94 east exit 10
Lake	Gurnee	39.1	62.9	IL 21 north (Riverside Drive)	Northern end of IL 21 overlap
Lake	Gurnee	39.3	63.2	IL 132 (Grand Avenue)	Northern terminus
1.000 mi = 1.609 km; 1.000 km = 0.621 mi: Concurrency terminus; Incomplete access
