= Eleventh Dream Day =

American alternative rock band

- Origin: Chicago, Illinois, U.S.
- Genre: Alternative rock
- Years active: 1983–present
- Labels: Amoeba; Fan Club; Atlantic; City Slang; Thrill Jockey; Comedy Minus One; Atavistic
- Members: Rick Rizzo; Janet Beveridge Bean; Doug McCombs; Mark Greenberg; Jim Elkington
- Past members: Baird Figi; Matthew "Wink" O'Bannon; Shu Shubat
- Website: eleventhdreamday.com

Eleventh Dream Day (EDD) is an American alternative rock band from Chicago.

== History ==
The band was founded by guitarists Rick Rizzo and Janet Beveridge Bean, who met at a place fondly known as 1069. This was a house/practice space/hang out in Louisville where at the time, Beveridge Bean was practicing with the band she was in with Tara Key and Tim Harris: the Zoo Directors. After moving to Chicago, Bean and Rizzo joined with guitarist Baird Figi and bassist Doug McCombs; Bean soon switched over to drums. Their first self-titled EP in 1987 introduced the hallmarks of EDD's sound: Neil Young-inspired electric guitar workouts mixed with punk energy.

The band's full-length follow-up, Prairie School Freakout (1988), won critical praise and the attention of major labels. The band then signed with Atlantic Records. Follow-ups Beet (1989) and Lived to Tell (1991) won more strong reviews but did not sell many copies; Figi left during the Lived to Tell tour and was replaced by Matthew "Wink" O'Bannon.

The band made a stab for commercial success with 1993's El Moodio, but the effort was unsuccessful and EDD was dropped from Atlantic's roster. O'Bannon left after recording 1994's Ursa Major (supposedly EDD's collective personal favorite, on Atavistic Records) and the band ceased to be a full-time entity; Rizzo went back to college to earn a degree in education, while Bean and McCombs concentrated on their other musical projects, Freakwater and Tortoise respectively.

Eleventh Dream Day has since recorded new albums every few years, starting with 1997's Eighth. Recent albums have balanced the band's Young-influenced approach with an interest in ambient sound, likely influenced by McCombs's work with Tortoise. EDD released Stalled Parade in 2000, playing a handful of shows after the album's release with Mark Greenberg of (The Coctails) assisting on keyboards and other instruments. Zeroes and Ones was released on April 25, 2006, on Thrill Jockey Records. Riot Now! was released on March 15, 2011, on Thrill Jockey Records.

New Moodio, a forgotten alternate version of El Moodio recorded in 1991 with Brad Wood at Idful Music Corporation in Chicago, was released for the first time two decades after the fact by Comedy Minus One in May 2013.

With the album "Works for Tomorrow" (2015), the band returned to a dual guitar lineup with the addition of Jim Elkington. The now five piece (including Mark Greenberg) band played several shows in 2015 celebrating the record which was well received by critics and fans. A surprise double album, Since Grazed, was released in April 2021. EDD continued to perform intermittently in Chicago.

== Members ==
Current members

- Rick Rizzo – guitar, vocals (1983–present)
- Janet Beveridge Bean – drums, vocals, guitar (1983–present)
- Doug McCombs – bass (1985–present)
- Mark Greenberg – keyboards, drums (2000–present)
- Jim Elkington – guitar, keyboards (2012–present)

Former members

- Shu Shubat – bass, vocals (1983–1985)
- Baird Figi – guitar (1985–1992)
- Matthew "Wink" O'Bannon – guitar (1992–1994)

== Albums ==
- Eleventh Dream Day (Amoeba Records, 1987)
- Prairie School Freakout (Amoeba Records, 1988)
- Beet (Atlantic Records, 1989)
- Borscht (Atlantic Records, 1990) - promo
- Lived to Tell (Atlantic Records, 1991)
- El Moodio (Atlantic Records, 1993)
- Ursa Major (Atavistic Records/City Slang Records, 1994)
- Eighth (Thrill Jockey, 1997)
- Stalled Parade (Thrill Jockey Records, 2000)
- Zeroes and Ones (Thrill Jockey Records, 2006)
- Riot Now! (Thrill Jockey Records, 2011)
- New Moodio (Comedy Minus One, 2013)
- Works for Tomorrow (Thrill Jockey Records, 2015)
- Since Grazed (Comedy Minus One, 2021)

== Singles ==
Year	Title	Chart positions	Album
Year	Title	US Modern Rock	Album
1990	"Testify"	26	Beet
1991	"Rose of Jericho"	27	Lived to Tell

== Compilation appearances ==
- Heat From The Wind Chill Factory (Dead Bunny) (1985) - "The Arsonist"
