= Irazu Costa Rican Restaurant =

Irazu Costa Rica Restaurant
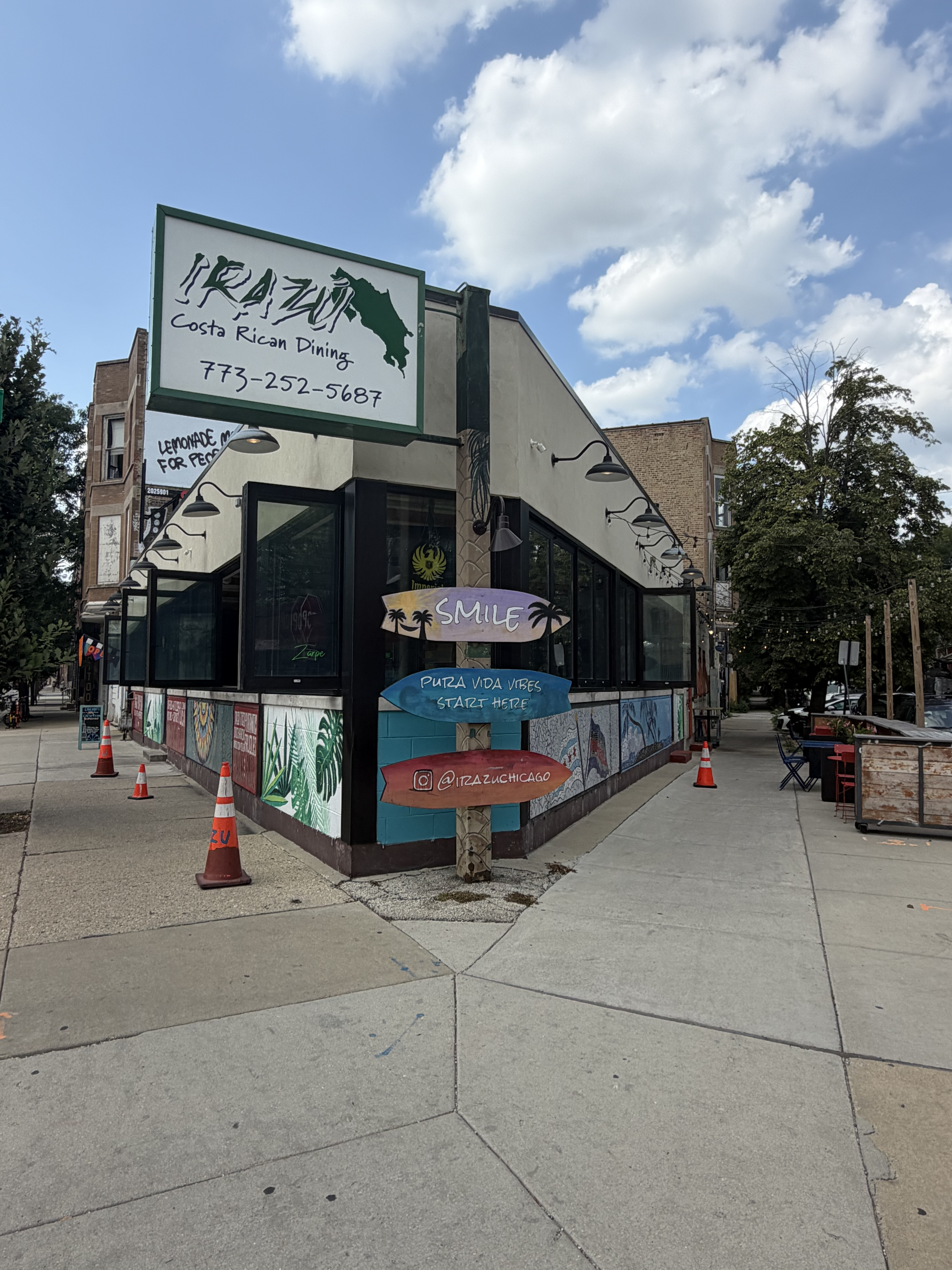
- Irazu Costa Rican Restaurant in 2026
- Interactive map of Irazu Costa Rica Restaurant

Restaurant information
- Established: 1990
- Owners: Henry and Miriam Cerdas
- Food type: Costa Rican cuisine
- Location: 1865 N. Milwaukee, Chicago, Illinois, 60647, United States
- Coordinates: 41.9155°N 87.6851°W
- Reservations: not accepted
- Website: www.irazuchicago.com

Irazu Costa Rican Restaurant is a Latin American restaurant in Chicago, Illinois that opened in 1990. It is located on Milwaukee Avenue in the Bucktown/Wicker Park neighborhood on Chicago's north side. The restaurant takes its name from the Irazú volcano in Costa Rica.

Irazú was founded on August 20, 1990, by Miriam and Gerardo Cerdas. In September 2025, the Chicago City Council issued a resolution honoring the restaurant and the Cerdas family during Hispanic Heritage Month.

The restaurant serves Costa Rican cuisine including sandwiches, traditional dishes, burritos, and non-alcoholic drinks, and milkshakes. Owner Henry Cerdas described it as "an overlap of Mexican and South American food."

== Media appearances ==
Irazú appeared in the 2011 Diners, Drive-ins and Dives episode "Latin Street Food"; the programme's Food Network videos included its chifrijo and pepito sandwich.

Food Network also profiled Irazú in The Secret Life of Milkshakes. The restaurant appeared in a 2008 episode of WTTW's Check, Please!.

In 2014, The Daily Meal included Irazú in its "35 Best Burritos in America" list. FiveThirtyEight covered the restaurant in a 2014 Burrito Bracket article.
