= Wicker Park (Chicago park) =

Park in Chicago, Illinois, United States

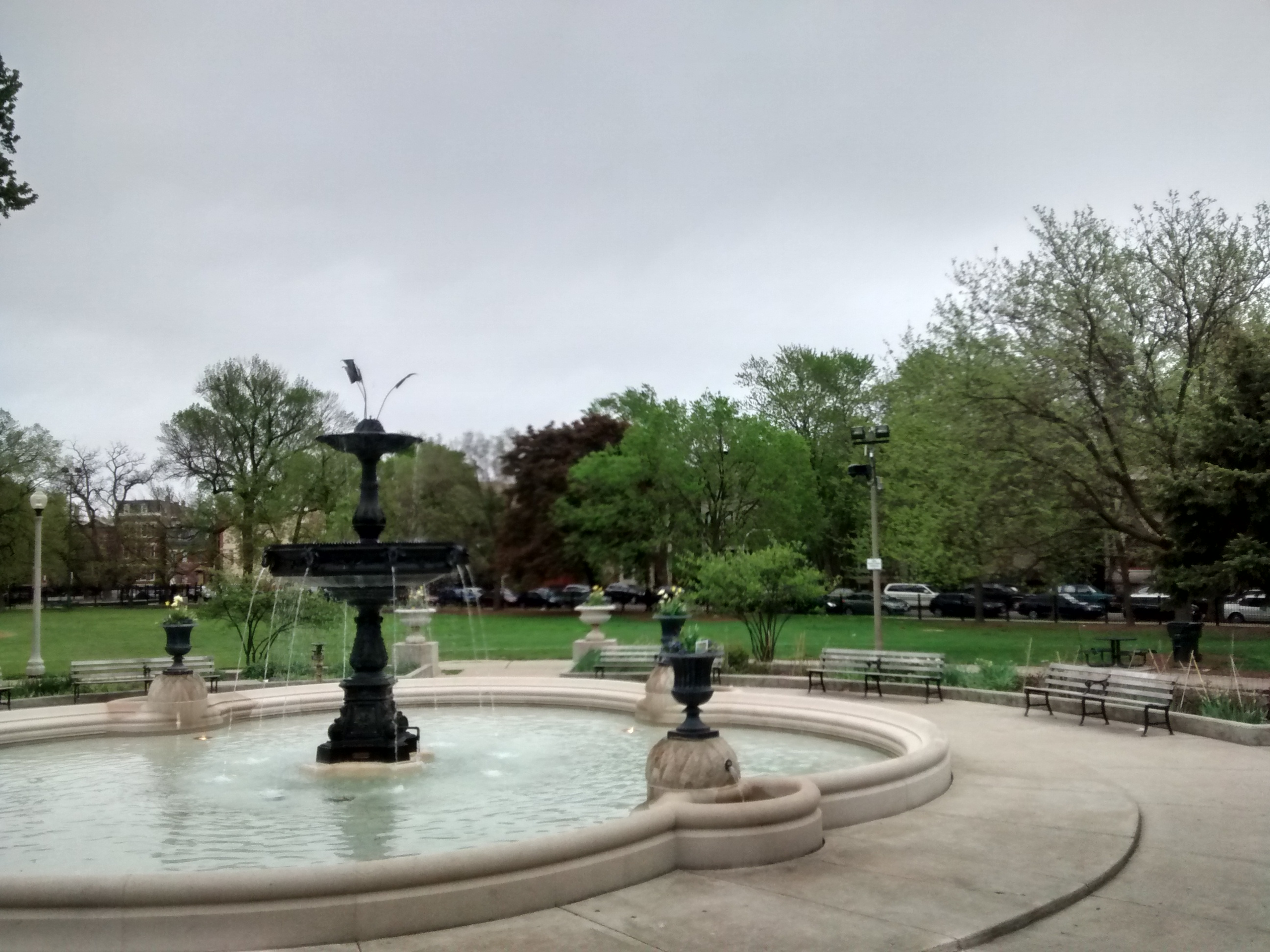
- Fountain on Wicker Park
- Interactive map of Wicker Park
- Type: Urban park
- Location: Wicker Park, Chicago, Illinois
- Coordinates: 41.907744°N 87.67676°W
- Area: 4.03 acres (1.63 ha)
- Created: 1870; 156 years ago
- Operator: Chicago Park District

Wicker Park is a 4.03-acre (1.63 ha) public urban park in the Wicker Park neighborhood of the West Town community and West Side district, in Chicago, Illinois. It is named after Charles G. Wicker and Joel H. Wicker.

== History ==
In late 1868, the Chicago Board of Public Works announced the desire to build a park "lying west of Milwaukee Avenue and south of North Avenue. The grounds are of considerable capacity and are laid out in a tasteful and attractive manner as a park." Present at the meeting was alderman Charles G. Wicker, who, with his brother Joel H. Wicker, purchased a 4-acre (16,000 m^{2}) parcel of land to the City of Chicago in 1870. The City of Chicago installed a small reservoir inside the triangular park.

At the end of the 19th century, the neighborhood around the park was subsumed into the surrounding Polish Downtown, and the area immediately surrounding the park became known as "the Polish Gold Coast".

In 1890, the West Park Commission filled in the reservoir and replaced it with lawn. Several years later a cut-granite fountain was installed. In 1908, the fountain was replaced with a wading pool and additional trees were planted in the park.

In 1934, the West Park Commission was consolidated into the Chicago Park District. The Chicago Park District installed a fieldhouse on the site in 1985.

== Community gardens ==
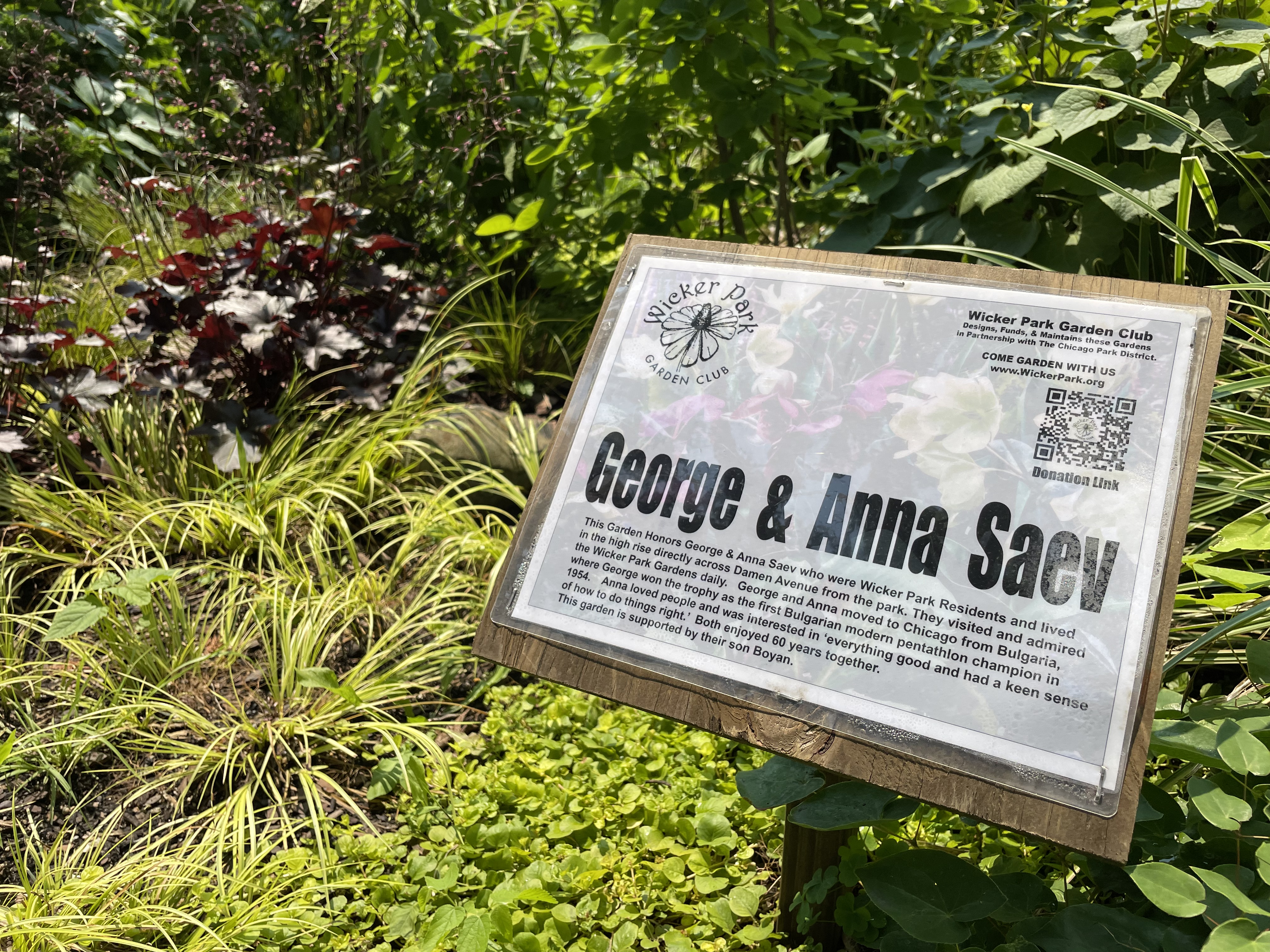
Saev garden section in the Wicker Park Gardens

Wicker Park contains approximately 10,000 square feet of ornamental community gardens. The gardens were designed, funded and are maintained by volunteers from the Wicker Park Garden Club in cooperation with the Chicago Park District’s Community Gardens in the Parks program. Maintained entirely on a volunteer basis, specific section of the gardens are dedicated to prominent local contributors who helped develop the space over the years including William Westfall, Allen Blaurock, Edith Konieczko,Peggy Thoma and others.The grounds also feature a dedicated section honoring Bulgarian modern pentathlete Georges Saev.

== Memorials and historical markers ==
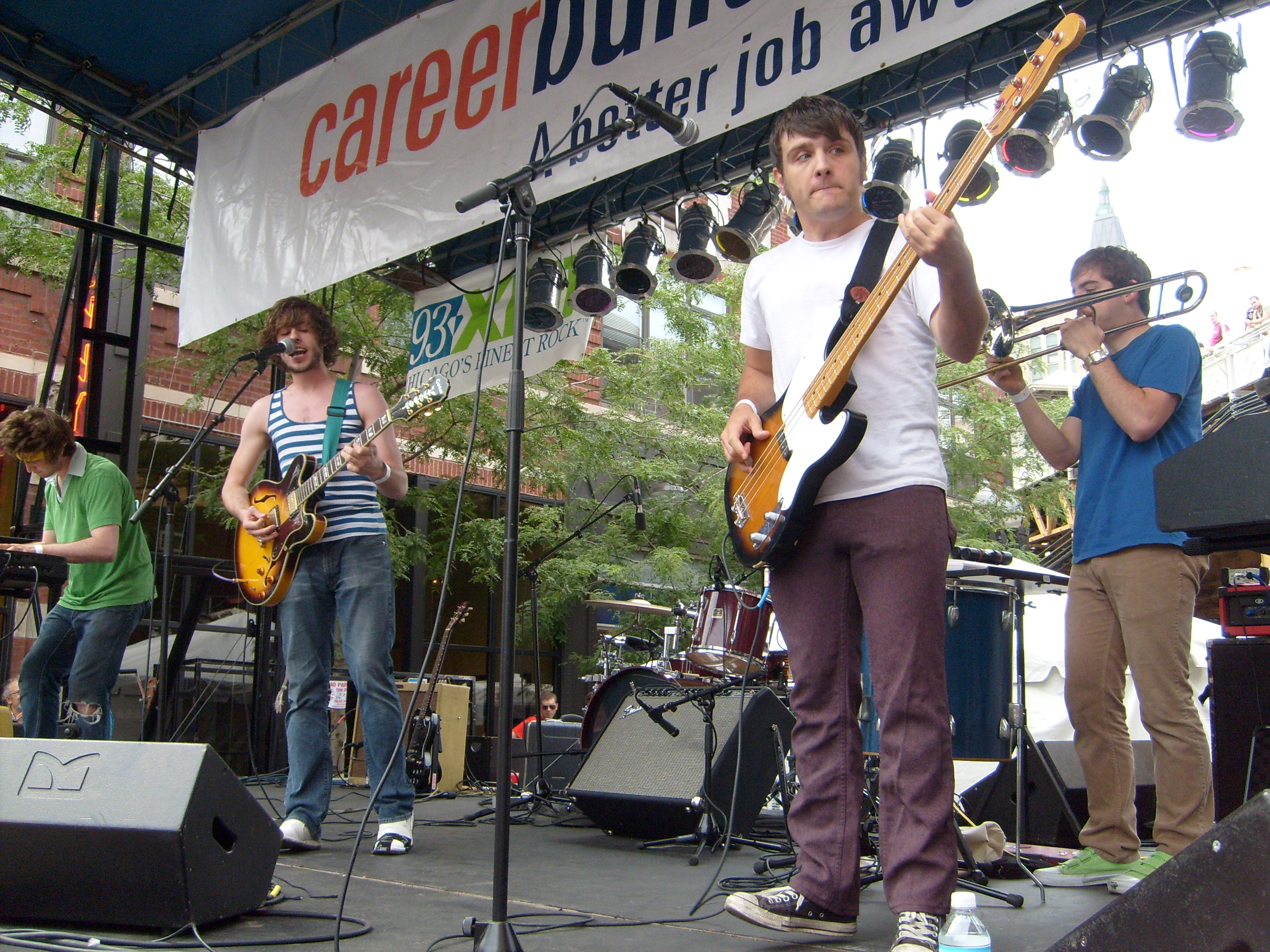
Concert at Wicker Park

A statue of Charles Gustavus Wicker, the park's namesake, sweeping with a broom can be found on the west side of the park; the statue was designed by Wicker's great-granddaughter, Nancy Deborah Wicker-Eilan. Another marker in a garden just west of the fieldhouse honors Ignacy Jan Paderewski, who resided in the Wicker Park neighborhood during World War I and later served as Prime Minister of Poland. A third marker describes the history of the park's fountain.

== Facilities ==
The dog-friendly park includes areas for baseball, gyms, a spraypool, a water playground, and a walking path.

== See also ==
- West Town, Chicago
- Parks of Chicago
