= Roads and expressways in Chicago =

Highway system

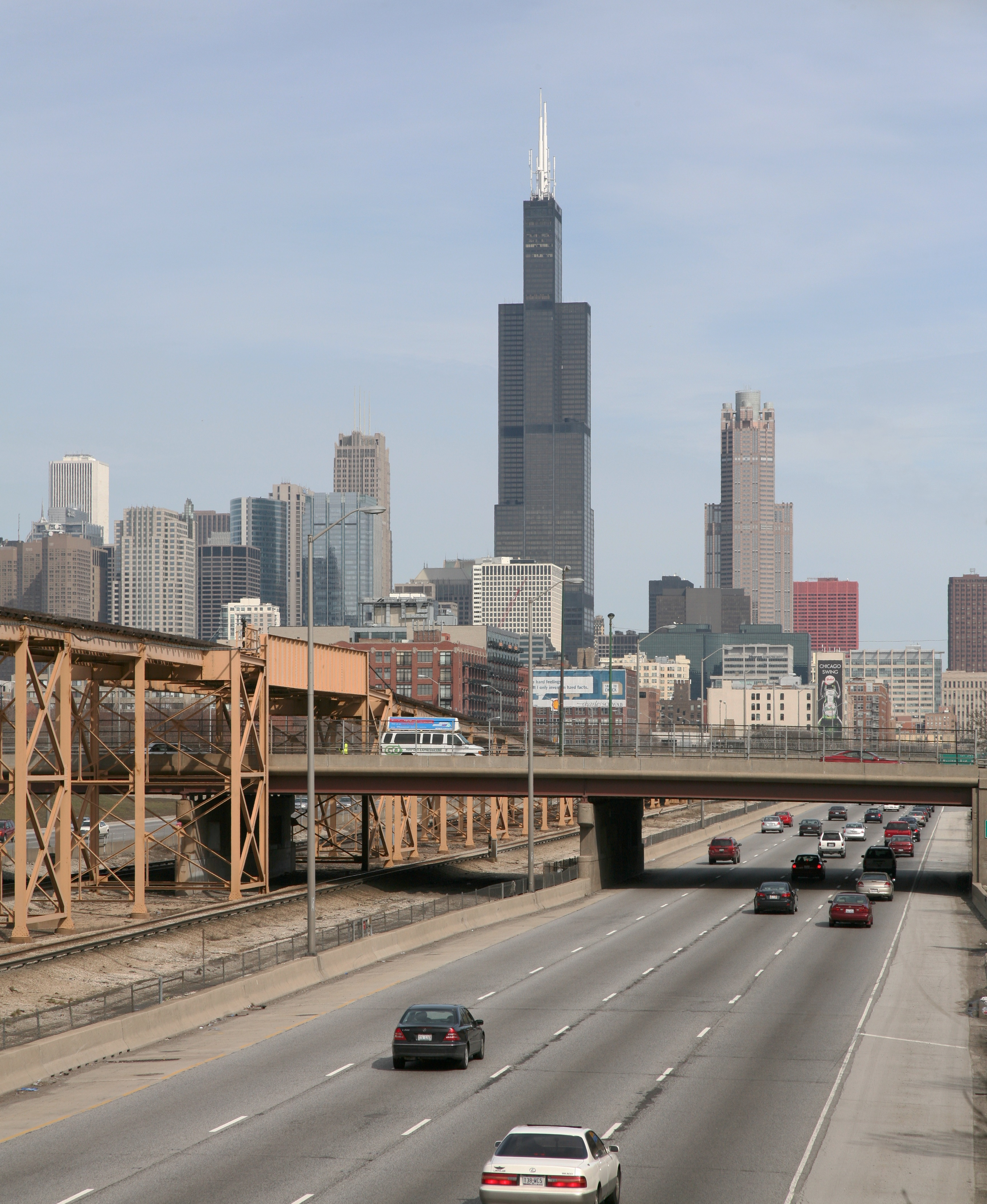
The Eisenhower Expressway crossing under Ashland Avenue, looking east toward downtown. The CTA's Blue Line travels along the median of the expressway.

The city of Chicago has many roads and expressways. Chicago also has a numbering system, used by both the city and neighboring suburbs, as well as many thoroughfares which pass through Chicago and neighboring suburbs.

== Street layout ==
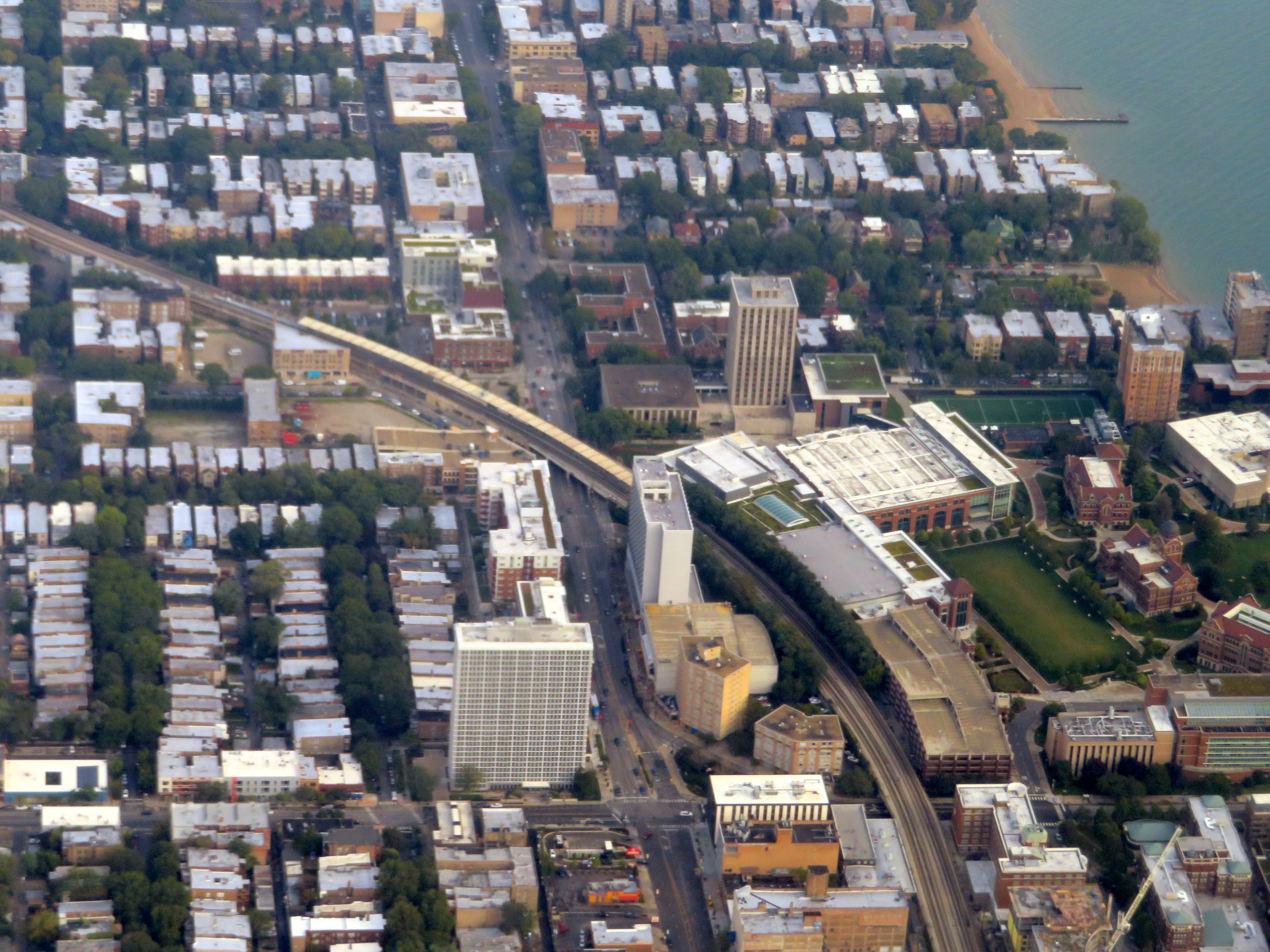
Much of Chicago's street system follows a grid pattern.

Chicago's streets were laid out in a grid that grew from the city's original townsite plan platted by James Thompson. Streets following the Public Land Survey System section lines later became arterial streets in outlying sections. As new additions to the city were platted, city ordinance required them to be laid out with eight streets to the mile in one direction and 16 in the other direction. A scattering of diagonal streets, many of them originally Native American trails, also cross the city. Many additional diagonal streets were recommended in the Plan of Chicago, but only the extension of Ogden Avenue was ever constructed. In the 1950s and 1960s, a network of superhighways was built radiating from the city center.

As the city grew and annexed adjacent towns, problems arose with duplicate street names and a confusing numbering system based on the Chicago River. On June 22, 1908, the city council adopted a system proposed by Edward P. Brennan; amended June 21, 1909. The changes were effective September 1, 1909 for most of the city.

Addresses in Chicago and some suburbs are numbered outward from baselines at State Street, which runs north and south, and Madison Street, which runs west and east.

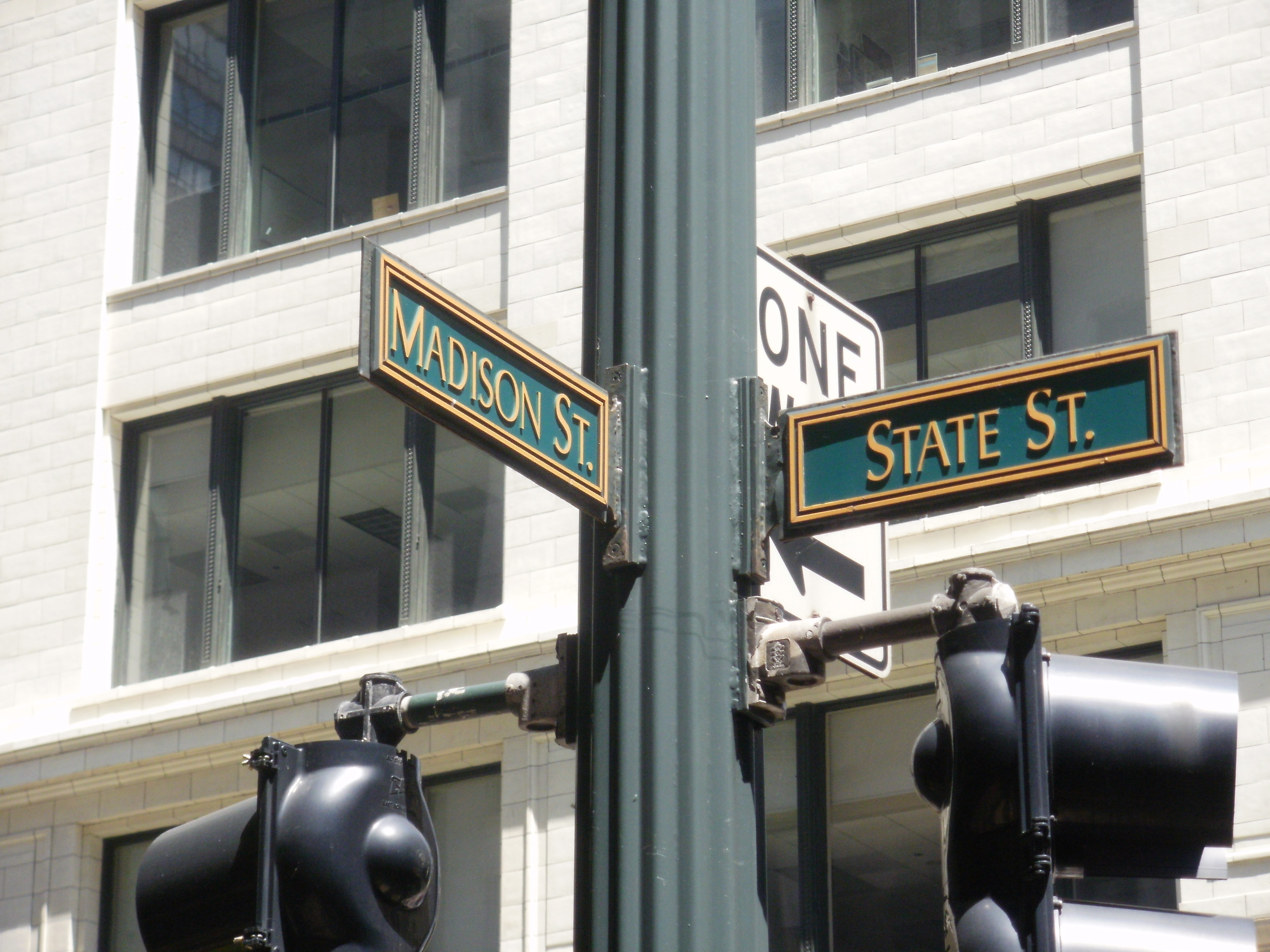
The origin of Chicago's directional address system is at State Street - separating East (E) from West (W), and Madison Street - North (N) from South (S).

A book was published in 1909 by The Chicago Directory Company indexing the old and new street numbers for most of Chicago. This volume is available online in PDF format indexed by initial letter, Plan of Re-Numbering, City of Chicago, August 1909. The opening text of the book says: EXPLANATORY

The new house numbering plan passed by the City Council June 22, 1908, to be in force and effect September 1, 1909, makes Madison Street from Lake Michigan to the city limits on the west the base line for numbering all north and south streets and streets running in northerly or southerly direction. For east and west streets and streets running in a generally east and west direction the base line is State Street from the southern city boundary line to North Avenue, thence extended by an imaginary line through Lincoln Park and Lake Michigan.

The downtown area did not conform to this system until April 1, 1911, per an amendment to the law on June 20, 1910. Downtown was defined as the Chicago River on the north and west, Roosevelt Road (Twelfth Street) on the south, and Lake Michigan on the east. The addition to cover downtown was published, and is also on line as a pdf indexed by downtown street name.

This additional paragraph explained the downtown changes:

The 1909 address change did not affect downtown Chicago, between the river and Roosevelt Road, the river and Lake Michigan. The ordinance was amended June 20, 1910 to include the downtown area. The new addresses for the "loop" went into use on April 1, 1911.

Chicago house numbers are generally assigned at the rate of 800 to a mile. The only exceptions are from Madison to 31st Street, just south of downtown. Roosevelt Road (previously Twelfth St) is one mile south of Madison with 1200 addresses to the mile, Cermak Road (previously 22nd Street) is two miles south of Madison with 1000 addresses to the mile, and 31st Street (3100 S) is three miles south of Madison with 900 addresses to the mile. South of 31st Street, the pattern of 800 to the mile resumes, with 39th Street the next major street, 47th after that, and so on. Individual house numbers are normally assigned at the rate of one per 20 feet of frontage. Thus the last two digits of house numbers generally go only as high as 67 before the next block number is reached. Higher house numbers are found on diagonal streets and have sometimes been assigned by request.

The blocks are normally counted out by "hundreds," so that Chicagoans routinely give directions by saying things such as "about twelve hundred north on Western" or "around twenty-four hundred west on Division" (which both describe the intersection of Western Avenue (2400 W) and Division Street (1200 N)).

South of Madison Street most of the west–east streets are simply numbered. The street numbering is aligned with the house numbering, so that 95th Street is exactly 9500 South. "Half-block" west–east thoroughfares in this area are numbered and called places; 95th Place would lie just south of(1/16 of a mile to be exact) and parallel to 95th Street, and just north of 96th Street.

Every four blocks (half-mile) is a major secondary street. For example, Division Street (1200 N) is less important than either Chicago Avenue (800 N) or North Avenue (1600 N), but is still a major thoroughfare. However, this is not always the case; for example, on the city's Far North Side, Peterson Avenue (6000 N) is a more heavily trafficked street than Bryn Mawr Avenue (5600 N), which sits exactly at the 7-mile marker. U.S. Route 14 is routed along Peterson between Clark Street at 1600 W and Cicero Avenue at 4800 W, whereas Bryn Mawr is discontinuous, split into two segments in this part of the city by Rosehill Cemetery between Damen and Western Avenues.

Even-numbered addresses are found on the north and west sides of a street, and odd numbers are found on the south and east sides, irrespective of the streets' position relative to the corner of State and Madison.

Diagonals, even if they were to run exactly 45 degrees off of the cardinal directions, are numbered as if they were north–south or east–west streets. Examples are North Lincoln Avenue and Ogden Avenue, which bends at Madison and changes from North Ogden to West Ogden.

The northernmost street in Chicago is Juneway Terrace (7800 N), just north of Howard Street. The southern boundary is 138th Street. The eastern boundary of Chicago is Avenue A/State Line Road (4100 E) along and south of 106th Street, and the furthest west the city extends is in the portion of O'Hare International Airport that lies in DuPage County, just east of Elmhurst/York Road.

== Street names ==
While all north–south streets within city limits are named, rather than numbered, smaller streets in some areas are named in groups all starting with the same letter; thus, when traveling westward on a Chicago street, starting just past Pulaski Road (4000 W), one will cross a mile-long stretch of streets which have names starting with the letter K (From east to west: Keystone (North Side)/Komensky (South Side), Karlov, Kedvale, Keeler, Kildare, Kolin, Kostner, Kenneth, Kilbourn, Kolmar, Kenton, Knox, Kilpatrick, Keating), giving rise to the expression "K-town". These streets are found approximately in the 11th mile west of the Indiana state line, and so begin with the 11th letter of the alphabet. A mile later, just past Cicero (4800 W), the starting letter changes to L, and mile by mile the letters progress up to P. Additionally, for most of the first mile west of the Illinois/Indiana state line, streets are lettered from Avenue A (S State Line Road) at the state line (4100 E) to Avenue O (3430 E), forming the A group. The areas that might otherwise be the B through J groups are the older parts of the city where street names were already well established before this system was developed (although some small groups of streets seem to have been given names intended to conform to the system), and the Q group (8800 to 9600 W) would fall west of the city, as the only land in Chicago west of 8800 West is O'Hare International Airport, undeveloped forest preserve, and a small strip of land connecting O'Hare to the rest of the city and containing only Foster Avenue.

== Suburbs ==
Some suburbs number their east–west streets in a continuation of the Chicago pattern, and even more number their houses according to the Chicago grid. A few suburbs also number their north–south avenues according to the Chicago grid, although such numbering vanished from Chicago itself long ago (the alphabetical naming scheme was devised to help eliminate it). For example, the 54th/Cermak terminus of the Pink Line is located near the intersection of 54th Avenue and Cermak Road (22nd Street) in Cicero. This is 54 blocks west of State Street in Chicago. A minor street 54 1/2 blocks west of State Street would be called 54th Court (in reality, that is Lotus Avenue in Chicago).

This pattern continues as far west as Plainfield, which has a 252nd Avenue, as far north as Skokie at Central Street (10100 North), and as far south as the southern edge of Will County. Suburbs that follow the Chicago numbering system include Berwyn, Bridgeview, Brookfield, Burbank, Channahon, Chicago Heights, Chicago Ridge, Cicero, Crystal Lake, Elwood, Evergreen Park, Franklin Park, Justice, Lincolnwood, Matteson, Monee, Morris, Morton Grove, Niles, North Chicago, Oak Forest, Oak Lawn, Orland Park, Oswego, River Grove, Rosemont, Skokie, Westchester, unincorporated parts of Des Plaines, Glenview, and other parts of Cook County, Will, DuPage, Kendall, and Grundy Counties. Other suburbs, including Evanston, Park Ridge, Oak Park, Glenview and Wilmette use their own numbering systems. The six "collar" counties (DuPage, Kane, Kendall, Lake, McHenry, and Will) use State and Madison as a base line. For example, 32W000 in DuPage County is 32 miles west of State Street, 38000 in Lake County would be 38 miles north of Madison Street, and is normally used without the direction letter. In these counties, unlike Chicago, numbering is 1,000 numbers to the mile, so in DuPage County 32 1/2 miles west is 32500.

Some Chicago suburbs in adjoining Northwest Indiana also use the Chicago numbering system. These include East Chicago, Whiting, and Hammond. There are even examples further south in Lake County in Dyer and Schererville such as 205th Place through 215th Street (these examples coordinate with the Chicago grid, not the Gary street system). Other municipalities, such as Highland, and Griffith are based on the Gary, Indiana numbering system, beginning with 5th Avenue in Gary and increasing numerically as one travels southward. Examples in Scheider in the far south of Lake County, Indiana go as far down as 244th Avenue.

The aforementioned pattern also occurs in Waukegan, Illinois, with Washington Street being the baseline between north and south. Nearby municipalities such as Gurnee, Park City, and North Chicago continue with the Waukegan numbering pattern, while rural areas in Lake County, Illinois follow the Chicago grid.

== Grid ==
=== Mile roads ===
	East–West Streets			North–South Streets		
Mile	Address number	Street name	Route designation	Address number	Street name	Route designation
44				44000 W	Game Farm Road	
43				43000 W	Swanberg Road	
42				42000 W	Rippburger Road; Eastman Drive	IL 47; CR 33 (Kane)
41				41000 W	La Fox Road	CR 81 (Kane)
40				40000 W	Coombs Road (Note: Church Road in Plattville)	
39				39000 W	Orchard Road (Note: Square Barn Road in Algonquin, Swanson Road in Crystal Lake)	CR 83 (Kane)
38				38000 W	Peck Road; Edgelawn Drive	CR 84 (Kane)
37				37000 W	Randall Road (Note: Grove Road in Oswego)	CR 34 (Kane); CR 16 (Kendall)
36				36000 W	Lincolnway Street; Lake Street	IL 31 / Lincoln Highway
35 1/2				35500 W	McLean Boulevard (Note: Pyott Road in Crystal Lake, Banbury Road in Batavia, Douglas Road near Oswego)	IL 31
35				35000 W	5th Street; River Street	IL 25
34 1/2				34500 W	IL 31; Mitchell Road (276th Avenue)	IL 31; IL 25
34				34000 W	Ohio Street (272nd Avenue) (Note: Radant Road in Batavia)	
33 1/2				33500 W	Farnsworth Avenue; Ridge Road (268th Avenue) (Note: Harvey Road in Oswego)	CR V37 (Grundy)
33				33000 W	Kautz Road (264th Avenue) (Note: County Line Road in Plainfield)	IL 25
32 1/2				32500 W	Eola Road (260th Avenue) (Note: Heggs Road in Plainfield, Kress Road in West Chicago)	CR 14 (DuPage); CR 18 (DuPage)
32				32000 W	Beverly Road (256th Avenue)	
31 1/2				31500 W	252nd Avenue (Normantown Road)	
31				31000 W	248th Avenue (Note: Wallin Drive in Plainfield)	
30 1/2				30500 W	Munger Road (244th Avenue) (Note: Van Dyke Road in Plainfield)	CR 18 (DuPage)
30				30000 W	IL 59 (240th Avenue)	IL 59; US 30 / Lincoln Highway
29 1/2				29500 W	Fort Hill Drive (236th Avenue) (Note: Old Sutton Road in Barrington Hills)	
29				29000 W	Rickert Drive; Book Road (232nd Avenue)	US 34; CR 1 (DuPage)
28				28000 W	Plainfield–Naperville Road (224th Avenue) (Note: Essington Road in Bolingbrook Plainfield, and Joliet)	CR 1 (DuPage); CR 14 (Will)
27	21600 N	Hawley Street	CR A38 (Lake)	27000 W	Barrington Road (Note: Shaffner Road in Wheaton; Washington Street and Modaff Road in Naperville; Kings Road in Bolingbrook) (216th Avenue)	
26	20800 N	Allanson Road		20400 W	Bartlett Road	
25	20000 N	Crystal Lake Avenue		20300 W	Hough Street	IL 59
24	19200 N	Indian Creek Road	US 14	20000 W	Summit Street	
23	18400 N	Miller Road; Rakow Road		18000 W	Roselle Road	CR 4 (DuPage)
22	17600 N	Half Day Road; Prairie Avenue	IL 22	16600 W	IL 53; Meacham Road (176th Avenue)	IL 53; CR V64
21	16800 N	Park Avenue (Note: Duffy Lane in Riverwoods)		16200 W	Rohlwing Road (Note: Columbine Avenue in Lombard; Woodward Avenue in Woodridge and Downers Grove; Smith Road in Lamont) (168th Avenue)	IL 53; CR 56 (DuPage)
20.5	16400 N	Aptakisic Road (Note: Berkeley Road in Highland Park)		16000 W	Barker Avenue	
20	16000 N	Greenwood Avenue		15800 W	Lemont Road (Note: Main Street in Lombard; Brookbank Road in Downers Grove) (160th Avenue)	CR 9 (DuPage)
19.5	15600 N	Deerfield Road		15400 W	Wilke Road	
19	15200 N	Roger Williams Avenue		15000 W	Fairview Avenue (Note: Prospect Avenue in Itasca and Wood Dale) (152nd Avenue)	CR 25 (DuPage)
18.5	14800 N	Ridgelee Road		14600 W	Williams Street; Fernandez Avenue	
18	14400 N	Commercial Avenue		14200 W	Ardmore Avenue; Cedar Road (Note: Tonne Road in Elk Grove Village; Cass Avenue in Westmont and Darien; Walker Road in Lemont) (144th Avenue)	CR 15 (DuPage); US 52
17.5	14000 N	Dundee Road	IL 68	13800 W	Goebbert Road	
17	13600 N	Walters Avenue		13400 W	Busse Road; Kingery Highway (Note: Clarendon Hills Road in Willowbrook and Darien; Parker Road in Homer Glen) (136th Avenue)	IL 83
16.5	13200 N	Tower Road		13100 W	Linneman Road	
16	12800 N	Palatine Road (Note: Pine Street in Winnetka)		12800 W	Elmhurst Road; York Road (Note: Madison Street in Hinsdale and Willowbrook; Bell Road in Lemont and Homer Glen)	CR 8 (DuPage)
15.5	12400 N	Willow Road (Note: Thomas Street in Arlington Heights)		12400 W	Garfield Street; Marshall Drive	
15	12000 N	Winnetka Road		12000 W	Mt. Prospect Road; County Line Road (Note: Will–Cook Road south of the Calumet Sag, Will Road in Diamond)	
14.5	11600 N	Illinois Road		11600 W	Taft Avenue; Warrington Road	
14	11200 N	Lake Avenue		11200 W	Wolf Road	US 6 / IL 7 CR W22
13.5	10800 N	Wilmette Avenue		10800 W	Gilbert Avenue; Willow Springs Road (Note: Roberta Avenue in Melrose Park, Northlake, and Franklin Park)	CR W75
13	10400 N	Glenview Road		10400 W	Mannheim Road (Note: Brainard Avenue in La Grange and Countryside; Flavin Road in Willow Springs)	US 12 / US 20 / US 45
12.5	10000 N	Old Orchard Road (Note: Lincoln Street in Mt. Prospect)	IL 83	10000 W	Scott Street; West Avenue (Note: 33rd Avenue in Stone Park and Melrose Park; Eastern Avenue in Bellwood)	
12	9600 N	Golf Road	IL 58	9600 W	25th Avenue (Note: Kenman Avenue in La Grange Park; Rose Street in Schiller Park; La Grange Road south of the Calumet Sag) (96th Avenue)/LaGrange Road	US 12 / US 20 / US 45
11.5	9200 N	Church Street		9200 W	17th Avenue; Maple Avenue (Note: Kean Avenue south of the Calumet Sag)	
11	8800 N	Dempster Street	US 14 / IL 58	8800 W	9th Avenue; East River Road (Note: Cork Avenue and 88th Avenue south of the Calumet Sag)	CR W30
10 1/2	8400 N	Main Street		8400 W	1st Avenue; Cumberland Avenue (Note: 84th Avenue south of the Calumet Sag)	IL 171
10	8000 N	Oakton Street		8000 W	Pacific Avenue (Note: Roberts Road between the Des Plaines River and the Calumet Sag; 80th Avenue south of the Calumet Sag)	CR W32
9 1/2	7600 N	Howard Street		7600 W	Oriole Avenue (Note: Lathrop Avenue in Forest Park and River Forest; 76th Avenue in Elmwood Park and south of the Calumet Sag)	
9	7200 N	Touhy Avenue	IL 72	7200 W	Harlem Avenue (72nd Avenue)	IL 43 US 66
8.5	6800 N	Pratt Boulevard		6800 W	Oak Park Avenue; Newcastle Avenue (Note: 68th Avenue in Palos Heights) (68th Avenue)	
8	6400 N	Devon Avenue	CR 6 (DuPage)	6400 W	Narragansett Avenue; Nagle Avenue; Ridgeland Avenue (Note: Ridgeland Avenue in the suburbs) (64th Avenue)	
7 1/2	6000 N	Peterson Avenue		6000 W	Austin Avenue (60th Avenue)	
7	5600 N	Bryn Mawr Avenue		5600 W	Central Avenue (56th Avenue)	
6 1/2	5200 N	Foster Avenue		5200 W	Laramie Avenue (52nd Avenue)	
6	4800 N	Lawrence Avenue		4800 W	Cicero Avenue (Note: Skokie Boulevard in Lincolnwood and Skokie) (48th Avenue)	US 41 / IL 50 / IL 83
5 1/2	4400 N	Montrose Avenue		4400 W	Kostner Avenue (44th Avenue)	
5	4000 N	Irving Park Road	IL 19	4000 W	Pulaski Road (Note: Crawford Avenue in Lincolnwood and Skokie) (40th Avenue); Crawford Avenue	
4 1/2	3600 N	Addison Street		3600 W	Central Park Avenue (36th Avenue)	
4	3200 N	Belmont Avenue		3200 W	Kedzie Avenue (32nd Avenue)	
3 1/2	2800 N	Diversey Parkway		2800 W	California Avenue (28th Avenue) (Note: Dodge Avenue in Evanston)	
3	2400 N	Fullerton Avenue		2400 W	Western Avenue (Note: Asbury Avenue in Evanston) (24th Avenue)	
2 1/2	2000 N	Armitage Avenue		2000 W	Damen Avenue (20th Avenue) (Note: Custer Avenue in Evanston)	
2	1600 N	North Avenue	IL 64	1600 W	Ashland Avenue (16th Avenue)	
1 1/2	1200 N	Division Street		1200 W	Racine Avenue (12th Avenue)	
1	800 N	Chicago Avenue		800 W	Halsted Street (8th Avenue)	IL 1
1/2	400 N	Kinzie Street		400 W	Sedgwick Street (4th Avenue); Stewart Avenue	
0	0 N/S	Madison Street		0 E/W	State Street (Middle Avenue)	CR W55
1/2	600 S	Harrison Street (6th Street)	CR 62	400 E	Martin Luther King Jr. Drive (South Parkway)	CR W55
1	1200 S	Roosevelt Road (12th Street)	IL 38	800 E	Cottage Grove Avenue	
1 1/2	1600 S	16th Street		1200 E	Woodlawn Avenue	
2	2200 S	Cermak Road (22nd Street) (Note: Fawell Boulevard in Glen Ellyn, Mack Road in Warrenville)		1600 E	Stony Island Avenue; Volbrecht Road	
2 1/2	2600 S	26th Street		2000 E	Jeffery Boulevard	
3	3100 S	31st Street (Oak Brook Road)	CR 34 (DuPage)	2400 E	Yates Boulevard	
3 1/2	3500 S	35th Street		2800 E	Burnham Avenue	
4	3900 S	Pershing Road (39th Street)		3200 E	Brandon Avenue	
4 1/2	4300 S	43rd Street (Note: Shields Avenue in Brookfield)		3600 E	Avenue L	
5	4700 S	47th Street (Note: Chicago Avenue in Hinsdale, Clarendon Hills, Westmont, and Downers Grove)		4000 E	Avenue C	
5 1/2	5100 S	51st Street; Hyde Park Boulevard		4400 E	Manor Avenue	
6	5500 S	Garfield Boulevard; 55th Street	CR 35 (DuPage)			
6 1/2	5900 S	59th Street (Note: Hobson Road in Downers Grove)				
7	6300 S	63rd Street	CR 38 (DuPage)			
7 1/2	6700 S	67th Street; Marquette Road				
8	7100 S	71st Street				
8 1/2	7500 S	75th Street	CR 33 (DuPage)			
9	7900 S	79th Street (Note: South Frontage Road in Burr Ridge, Bailey Road in Naperville)	CR B40			
9 1/2	8300 S	83rd Street (Note: German Church Road in Willow Springs and Burr Ridge; Montgomery Road in Aurora)				
10	8700 S	87th Street (Note: Oldfield Road in Darien and Downers Grove Township, Keating Drive in Aurora and Wheatland Township)	CR 31 (DuPage)			
10 1/2	9100 S	91st Street				
11	9500 S	95th Street	US 12 / US 20; CR 89 (Will)			
11 1/2	9900 S	99th Street				
12	10300 S	103rd Street				
12 1/2	10700 S	107th Street				
13	11100 S	111th Street (Note: Hassert Boulevard in Wheatland and Bolingbrook Township)	IL 83; CR 66 (Will)			
13 1/2	11500 S	115th Street (Note: Claar Boulevard in Bolingbrook and DuPage Township)				
14	11900 S	119th Street (Note: Rodeo Drive in Bolingbrook, Plainfield and Wheatland Township)				
14 1/2	12300 S	123rd Street (Note: McCarthy Road in Palos Park and Palos Township, Lemont Township and Lemont)				
15	12700 S	127th Street (Note: Normantown Road in Romeoville, Reagan Boulevard in Bolingbrook and Plainfield)	IL 83			
15 1/2	13100 S	131st Street				
16	13500 S	135th Street; Romeo Road (Note: Pilcher Road in Plainfield)	CR 35 (Will)			
16 1/2	13900 S	139th Street				
17	14300 S	143rd Street (Note: Taylor Road in Romeoville, Plainfield Township, and Lockport Township)	IL 7 CR 37 (Will); US 30			
17 1/2	14700 S	147th Street/Sibley Boulevard	IL 83			
18	15100 S	151st Street; Lockport Street (Note: Airport Road in Romeoville, Plainfield Township, and Lockport Township)	CR W32; IL 126			
18 1/2	15500 S	155th Street (Note: Dreesen Street in Harvey, 158th Street east of the Little Calumet River)	CR W55			
19	15900 S	159th Street (Note: 162nd Street in South Holland, Renwick Road in Plainfield, Crest Hill, and Romeoville); River Oaks Drive	IL 7 / US 6 CR 36 (Will)			
19 1/2	16300 S	163rd Street (Note: 7th Street in Lockport)				
20	16700 S	167th Street (Note: Division Street in Lockport); 170th Street				
20 1/2	17100 S	171st Street	CR B60			
21	17500 S	175th Street (Note: Bruce Road in Lockport and Homer Glen, Caton Farm Road in Crystal Lawns and Crest Hill); 178th Street	CR 5 (Will); CR 23 (Kendall)			
21 1/2	17900 S	179th Street; Ridge Road				
22	18300 S	183rd Street (Note: 186th Street east of the Calumet Expressway, Theodore Street in Crest Hill and Joliet); 186th Street				
22 1/2	18700 S	187th Street (Note: Ingalls Avenue in Joliet)	US 6			
23	19100 S	191st Street (Note: Flossmoor Road in Flossmoor; Glenwood–Lansing Road in Glenwood and Lansing, Black Road in Joliet)/Flossmoor Road; Glenwood-Lansing Road	CR B65; CR 84 (Will)			
23 1/2	19500 S	195th Street				
24	19900 S	Vollmer Road; Jefferson Street	US 52			
24 1/2	20300 S	203rd Street; Joe Orr Road				
25	20700 S	207th Street (Note: 10th Street in Chicago Heights)				
25 1/2	21100 S	Lincoln Highway/211th Street/14th Street	US 30 / Lincoln Highway			
26	21500 S	215th Street				
26 1/2	21900 S	26th Street (219th Street)				
27	22300 S	Sauk Trail/Laraway Road (223rd Street)	CR 74 (Will)			
27 1/2	22700 S	34th Street (227th Street)				
28	23100 S	Delaney Road; Steger Road (Note: Schweitzer Road in Joliet)/34th Street	CR C12 / CR C13			
29	23900 S	Stuenkel Road; University Parkway; Richton Road				
30	24700 S	Bluff Road-Dralle Rd; Exchange Street	CR 77 (Will) CR 49 (Will)			
30 1/2	25100 S	Manhattan-Elwood Road; Burrville Road; Exchange Street	CR 17 (Will)			
31	25500 S	Manhattan-Monee Road; Arsenal Road	CR 6 (Will); CR 17 (Will); US 6			
31 1/2	25900 S	Crete-Monee Road	CR 21 (Will)			
32	26300 S	Bruns Rd				
33	27100 S	Pauling Road/Goodenow Road	CR 23 (Will)			
34	27900 S	Blodgett Road-Offner Rd	CR C26 (Grundy); US 6			
35	28700 S	Eagle Lake Road				
36	29500 S	Joliet Road; North Peotone Road (Note: Lorenzo Road north of Braidwood, Pine Bluff Road south of Morris, Church Road in Beecher)	CR 80 (Will); US 52; CR 20 (Will)			
37	30300 S	Peotone-Beecher Road; Indiana Avenue	CR 24 (Will)			
38	31100 S	Wilmington Road; Cornell Road	CR 25 (Will)			
39	31900 S	Kennedy Road; Delite Inn Road				
40	32700 S	Reed Road; County Line Road-12000N	IL 113			

(No part of Golf Road, Dempster Street, Oakton Street, Wolf Road, LaGrange Road or 143rd Street to 311th Street actually lies within the boundaries of Chicago. These streets are included for reference, since they are a continuation of the Chicago mile street pattern into the suburbs.)

=== Downtown ===
The density of main streets in downtown Chicago is greater than in the rest of the city, with some at half-block spacing (just 50 address numbers or one-sixteenth mile from the next parallel street), or block spacing between main streets, unlike the rest of the city where the main streets are spaced at half-mile and mile intervals:

- North/south:
  - Canal Street (500 W)
  - Wacker Drive (400 W)
  - Franklin Street (300 W)
  - Wells Street (200 W)
  - LaSalle Street (140 W)
  - Clark Street (100 W)
  - Dearborn Street (36 W)
  - State Street (0 E/W)
  - Wabash Avenue (44 E)
  - Michigan Avenue (100 E)
  - Columbus Drive/Fairbanks Court (300 E)
  - McClurg Court (400 E)
- East/west:
  - Oak Street (1000 N)
  - Walton Street (932 N)
  - Delaware Place (900 N)
  - Chestnut Street (860 N)
  - Pearson Street (830 N)
  - Chicago Avenue (800 N)
  - Superior Street (732 N)
  - Huron Street (700 N)
  - Erie Street (658 N)
  - Ontario Street (628 N)
  - Ohio Street (600 N)
  - Grand Avenue (530 N)
  - Illinois Street (500 N)
  - Hubbard Street (430 N)
  - Kinzie Street (400 N)
  - Wacker Drive (300 N)
  - Lake Street (200 N)
  - Randolph Street (150 N)
  - Washington Street (100 N)
  - Madison Street (0 N/S)
  - Monroe Street (100 S)
  - Adams Street (200 S)
  - Jackson Boulevard (300 S)
  - Van Buren Street (400 S)
  - Ida B. Wells Drive/Congress Parkway (500 S)
  - Harrison Street (600 S)
  - Balbo Drive (700 S)
  - Polk Street (800 S)

=== Continuation into Indiana ===
Some suburbs in Indiana, including Hammond, Highland, and Whiting, use the Chicago grid. Other suburbs, including Griffith, use the Gary street system.

- North/south:
  - 4400 E - Manor Avenue, Lyman Avenue
  - 4800 E - Calumet Avenue
  - 5200 E - Columbia Avenue
  - 5600 E - White Oak Avenue
  - 6000 E - Indianapolis Boulevard
  - 6400 E - Wicker Avenue
  - 6800 E - Kennedy Avenue
  - 7200 E - Parrish Avenue
  - 7600 E - Grand Avenue
  - 8000 E - Cline Avenue
  - 8400 E - Morse Street
  - 8800 E - Colfax Street
  - 9200 E - Burr Street
  - 9600 E - Clark Road
  - 10000 E - Whitcomb Street
- East/west:
  - 11900 S - 119th Street
  - 12700 S - 127th Street
  - 13500 S - Riley Road
  - 13900 S - McShane Avenue
  - 14300 S - 143rd Street
  - 14700 S - Chicago Avenue
  - 15100 S - 151st Street
  - 15900 S - Eaton Street
  - 16300 S - Kenwood Street
  - 16700 S - 167th Street
  - 17100 S - 171st Street
  - 17500 S - 175th Street
  - 17900 S - Broadmoor Avenue
  - 18700 S - Fisher Street
  - 19500 S - Superior Avenue
  - 20300 S - Main Street (Griffith)
  - 21100 S - 211th Street
  - 21900 S - Joliet Street

=== Secondary streets ===
- East/west:
  - 10000 N – (Old Orchard Road)
  - 9200 N – (Church Street)
  - 8400 N – (Main Street)
  - 7600 N – Howard Street
  - 6800 N – Pratt Avenue
  - 6000 N – Peterson Avenue
  - 5200 N – Foster Avenue
  - 4600 N – Wilson Avenue (not a half-mile)
  - 4400 N – Montrose Avenue
  - 3600 N – Addison Street
  - 2800 N – Diversey Parkway
  - 2000 N – Armitage Avenue
  - 1200 N – Division Street
  - 400 N – Kinzie Street
  - 1000 S – Taylor Street (not a half-mile)
  - 1600 S – 16th Street
  - 2600 S – 26th Street
  - 3500 S – 35th Street
  - 4300 S – 43rd Street
  - 5100 S – 51st Street (East Hyde Park Boulevard)
  - 5900 S – 59th Street
  - 6700 S – Marquette Road (67th Street)
  - 7500 S – CR 33 75th Street
  - 8300 S – 83rd Street (German Church Road in Willow Springs, Montgomery Road in Aurora)
  - 9100 S – 91st Street
  - 9900 S – 99th Street
  - 10400 S - 104th Street
  - 10700 S – 107th Street
  - 11500 S – 115th Street (Claar Boulevard in Bolingbrook)
  - 12300 S – 123rd Street (McCarthy Road in Palos Park)
  - 13000 S – 130th Street (not a half-mile)
  - 13800 S - 138th Street (boundary of Chicago)
- North/south:
  - 9400 W – River Road (not a half-mile)
  - 9200 W - Maple Ave-17th Ave (92nd Ave)
  - 8800 W 9th Ave-East River Rd (88th Ave)
  - 8400 W – 1st Avenue (Cumberland Avenue)
  - 7600 W – Oriole Avenue (76th Ave)
  - 6800 W – Oak Park Avenue
  - 6000 W – Austin Avenue
  - 5200 W – Laramie Avenue
  - 4400 W – Kostner Avenue
  - 3600 W – Central Park Avenue
  - 3400 W – Kimball Avenue (Homan Avenue) not a half-mile
  - 2800 W – California Avenue
  - 2000 W – Damen Avenue
  - 1200 W – Racine Avenue
  - 400 E – Martin Luther King Jr. Drive (King Drive)
  - 1200 E – Woodlawn Avenue
  - 2000 E – Jeffery Boulevard
  - 2628 E – Torrence Avenue (not a half-mile)
  - 2800 E – Burnham Avenue
  - 3000 E – Commercial Avenue (not a half-mile)
  - 3600 E – Avenue L

The half-mile numbered streets on the South Side are all secondary streets: 35th, 43rd, 51st, 59th, etc.; all are numbered aside from Marquette Road, running at 6700 S, west from King Drive (400 E) to the city's western limit at Cicero Avenue (4800 W), near Midway International Airport. East of King to near Lake Michigan at 2400 E, it is called 67th Street, and Marquette is aligned one block to the north on what would be 66th Street.

(No part of Old Orchard Road, Church Street, or Main Street actually lies within the boundaries of Chicago. These streets are included for reference, since they are a continuation of the Chicago mile street pattern into the suburbs.)

A similar numbering system is also used in Milwaukee, Wisconsin.

=== Diagonal roads ===
The following streets run diagonally through Chicago's grid system on all or part of their courses. These streets tend to form major 5 or 6-way intersections. In many cases they were Indian trails, or were among the earliest streets established in the city. Diagonals are numbered as north–south or east–west streets. Examples are North Lincoln Avenue and Ogden Avenue, which bends at Madison and changes from North Ogden to West Ogden.

- N. Rogers Avenue
- N. Ridge Avenue/Boulevard
- N. Broadway
- N. Clark Street
- N. Rush Street
- N. Lincoln Avenue
- N. Sheridan Road
- N. Caldwell Avenue
- N. Lehigh Avenue
- N. Clybourn Avenue
- N. Kingsbury Street
- N. Elston Avenue
- N. Avondale Avenue
- N. Milwaukee Avenue
- N. Northwest Highway
- W. Forest Preserve Drive
- W. Higgins Avenue
- CR 20 W. Grand Avenue
- W. Lake Street
- W. Fifth Avenue
- N. and W. Ogden Avenue
- S. Blue Island Avenue
- S. Canalport Avenue
- S. Archer Avenue
- N. Stagecoach Trail
- S. Governors Highway
- W. Columbus Avenue
- S. Vincennes Avenue
- S. Beverly Avenue
- S. Anthony Avenue
- S. South Chicago Avenue
- S. Exchange Avenue
- S. Ewing Avenue
- S. Brainard Avenue
- S. South Shore Drive
- S. Indianapolis Avenue
- CR 31 W. Plainfield Road
- CR 2 W. Hobson Road
- E. Boughton Road
- E. Oldfield Road
- E. Maple Avenue
- W. Batavia Road
- W. Wolf's Crossing Road
- W. Main Street
- W. New Avenue
- W. High Lake Road
- W. Crescent Boulevard
- E. Glenwood-Dyer Road

== Expressways ==
The city of Chicago contains seven major Interstate highways.

Roadway Name	Numbers	Description
Kennedy Expressway (Northwest Expressway)	I-90; I-94; I-190	Runs from O'Hare east and south to downtown Chicago. It interchanges with the Jane Addams and the Tri-State Tollways near Cumberland Avenue on the city's far northwest side, with the Edens Expressway near Montrose Avenue on the near northwest side, and with the Dan Ryan and Eisenhower Expressways at its southern terminus downtown at the Jane Byrne Interchange. The portion from O'Hare to the Jane Addams and the Tri-State Tollways is I-190; the remainder is signed as I-90. I-94 is overlaid on I-90 south of the junction with the Edens.
Jane Addams Memorial Tollway (Northwest Tollway)	I-39 Toll I-90 Toll US 51 Toll	Runs from its complex interchange with the Kennedy Expressway and the Tri-State Tollway through the northwest suburbs towards Rockford and South Beloit. U.S. Route 51 is also one of the only toll roads that is a U.S. Highway in the nation.
Edens Expressway (Skokie Highway)	I-94; US 41	Runs south from Park Avenue West in Highland Park to its interchange with the Kennedy Expressway near Montrose. The Edens Spur (formally part of the Tri-State Tollway) splits off near the north end to meet the Tri-State. The Edens south of the Spur is signed as I-94; the section north of the Skokie Road exit in Wilmette is signed as US 41. US 41 continues north as Skokie Highway beyond the northern terminus of the Edens.
Dan Ryan Expressway	I-90; I-94	Runs south from the Jane Byrne Interchange near the Loop to the Bishop Ford Freeway in the Far Southeast Side in Chicago. In between, the Dan Ryan interchanges with the Stevenson Expressway and the Chicago Skyway near 66th Street. The portion between the Jane Byrne Interchange and the junction with the Chicago Skyway is overlaid with I-90.
Eisenhower Expressway (Congress Expressway)	I-290 IL 110 (CKC); IL 53	Runs west from the Jane Byrne Interchange to an interchange with the Tri-State Tollway and the eastern terminus of the Ronald Reagan Memorial Tollway (I-88) near Hillside, Illinois. Further west, I-290 turns northwest and becomes the "Eisenhower Extension". At the interchange with I-90 near Schaumburg, it continues as IL 53 until eventually terminating at Lake Cook Road. East of the Jane Byrne Interchange, the route continues downtown as Ida B. Wells Drive.
Stevenson Expressway (Southwest Expressway)	I-55	Runs southwest from Lake Shore Drive to the Tri-State Tollway in Burr Ridge. Along the way, the expressway interchanges with the Dan Ryan before heading to the south and southwestern neighborhoods of Chicago. The Stevenson then continues past Midway Airport and out of Chicago.
Veterans Memorial Tollway (North–South Tollway)	I-355 Toll	Runs south from an interchange with I-290 near Itasca to I-80 near New Lenox. Along the way, I-355 runs through the western suburbs to an interchange with I-88 before continuing south to the interchange with I-55. Then it continues south along 11 miles (18 km) of tollway to its southern terminus at I-80.
Ronald Reagan Memorial Tollway (East–West Tollway)	I-88 Toll IL 56 Toll IL 110 (CKC)	Runs from a complex interchange with the Eisenhower Expressway and the Tri-State Tollway west to U.S. Route 30 near Rock Falls. Along the way, the tollway meets another complex interchange with I-355. Then it heads through the western suburbs into north-central Illinois.
Interstate 57 (Dan Ryan West Leg)	I-57	Runs south from the junction of the Dan Ryan Expressway and Bishop Ford Freeway to the southern suburbs. Known originally as the "Dan Ryan West Leg", the name has since dropped from common usage. As such, it is the only freeway within the city of Chicago lacking a formal name.
Bishop Ford Freeway (Calumet Expressway)	I-94; IL 394	Runs from the southern terminus of the Dan Ryan Expressway, heads east, then south through the Far Southeast Side in Chicago to the southern suburbs before ending at a junction with the Kingery Expressway and the Tri-State Tollway. South of that point, it continues as IL 394 until IL 1 in Goodenow.
Chicago Skyway (Calumet Skyway)	I-90 Toll	The Skyway angles off from the Dan Ryan Expressway near 66th Street and heads southeast toward Indiana. The Skyway ends after a toll bridge over the Little Calumet River and the Indiana state line, at which point it becomes the Indiana Toll Road.
Tri-State Tollway	I-80 Toll I-94 Toll I-294 Toll	Serves as a toll bypass around Chicago. The tollway runs from a combination interchange with the Kingery Expressway and the Bishop Ford Freeway towards an interchange with US 41 just south of the Wisconsin state line. North of the junction with the Edens Spur the Tri-State is signed as I-94; on and south of this it is signed as I-294, the southern part of which is overlaid by I-80.
Kingery Expressway	I-80; I-94; US 6	Located entirely in Lansing, Illinois, this is a three-mile-long expressway running from the interchange with the Bishop Ford Freeway and the Tri-State Tollway to the Illinois/Indiana border.
Lake Shore Drive	US 41	A major limited-access highway running along the Lake Michigan shoreline from East 67th Street in southern Chicago to Hollywood Avenue in Chicago's Edgewater neighborhood. For most of its length, Lake Shore Drive is signed as US 41. Portions of Lake Shore Drive were constructed as an expressway.
Elgin Bypass	US 20	A five-mile freeway signed as US 20, bypassing Elgin, Illinois. It goes west from the Villa Street interchange, meets IL 25, crosses the Fox River, then meets State Street, McLean Boulevard, and Randall Road before continuing at-grade.
Western Algonquin Bypass	IL 31	A two-and-a-half-mile bypass in Algonquin and Crystal Lake. It has two exits on IL 62 (Algonquin Road) and US 14.
Kingery Highway	IL 83	From Bensenville, the Kingery Highway heads south 18 miles to just south of the Des Plaines River. It is a multi-lane divided limited-access road with grade-separated portions.
Amstutz Expressway	IL 137	A two-mile expressway located entirely in Waukegan, Illinois. It has only one exit at Grand Avenue.
Elgin–O'Hare Tollway ( Elgin–O'Hare Expressway)	IL 390 Toll	Formerly an unnumbered free expressway, it heads west from IL 83 in Bensenville through Itasca, Roselle, and Schaumburg until terminating at an interchange with U.S. Route 20. Until 2017, the expressway ended at IL 53 in Itasca. A one-mile eastern extension to I-490 is under construction.

== U.S. Routes ==
U.S. Routes	Description
US 6	
US 12; US 20	The two Routes enter through the southeastern part of the city from Indiana with U.S. Route 41, underneath the Chicago Skyway Toll Bridge. At 95th Street, they head west to an intersection with U.S. Route 45 west of the city. There they go north on LaGrange Road to Lake Street, where US 20 turns northwest through Elgin to Iowa. US 12 and US 45 continue north past O'Hare Airport to Des Plaines, where US 12 turns on Rand Road and goes northwest, then north to Wisconsin.
US 14	The route splits off from U.S. Route 41 at Bryn Mawr Avenue by Lake Michigan on the north side of the city. US 14 then recrosses US 41 and eventually exits the city as Caldwell Avenue.
US 30	
US 34	The route originally began downtown and ran west on Ogden Avenue and through the suburbs, continuing through Aurora and on to Iowa. In 1970 the beginning was moved west to Harlem Avenue (Illinois Route 43), where it intersected with US 66.
US 41	The route enters through the southeastern part of the city from Indiana with U.S. Route 12 and U.S. Route 20, underneath the Chicago Skyway Toll Bridge. At 95th Street, when US 12 and US 20 turn west, it continues north along the lakefront, especially via Lake Shore Drive. US 41 then departs from Lake Shore Drive at Foster Avenue. From Foster Avenue, US 41 continues northwest on Lincoln Avenue, finally exiting Chicago at Devon Avenue into the suburb of Lincolnwood.
US 45	The route comes north from Kentucky and intersects U.S. Route 12 and U.S. Route 20 at 95th Street west of Chicago. The three routes go north on LaGrange Road, then US 12 and US 45 continue north on Mannheim Road past O'Hare Airport and into Des Plaines. Separating from US 12, it follows the Des Plaines River as Des Plaines River Road, then continues north on Milwaukee Avenue towards Wisconsin.
US 52	
Historic US 66	The route started downtown and followed Ogden Avenue west out of the city, then southwest to Joliet and on to St Louis. Status as a U.S. Route in Illinois was discontinued in 1974 largely due to Interstate 55 paralleling the stretch. Some remnants are signed as historic.

== County roads ==
Cook County has a modest amount of county roads after plans were made in 2009 to designate many roads on county ownership as a public service.

Only the designated streets in the townships of Lemont, Palos, Orland, Bremen, Lyons (south of the rivers) and Wheeling have the blue pentagon signs that are used to demarcate county roads.

== Gallery ==
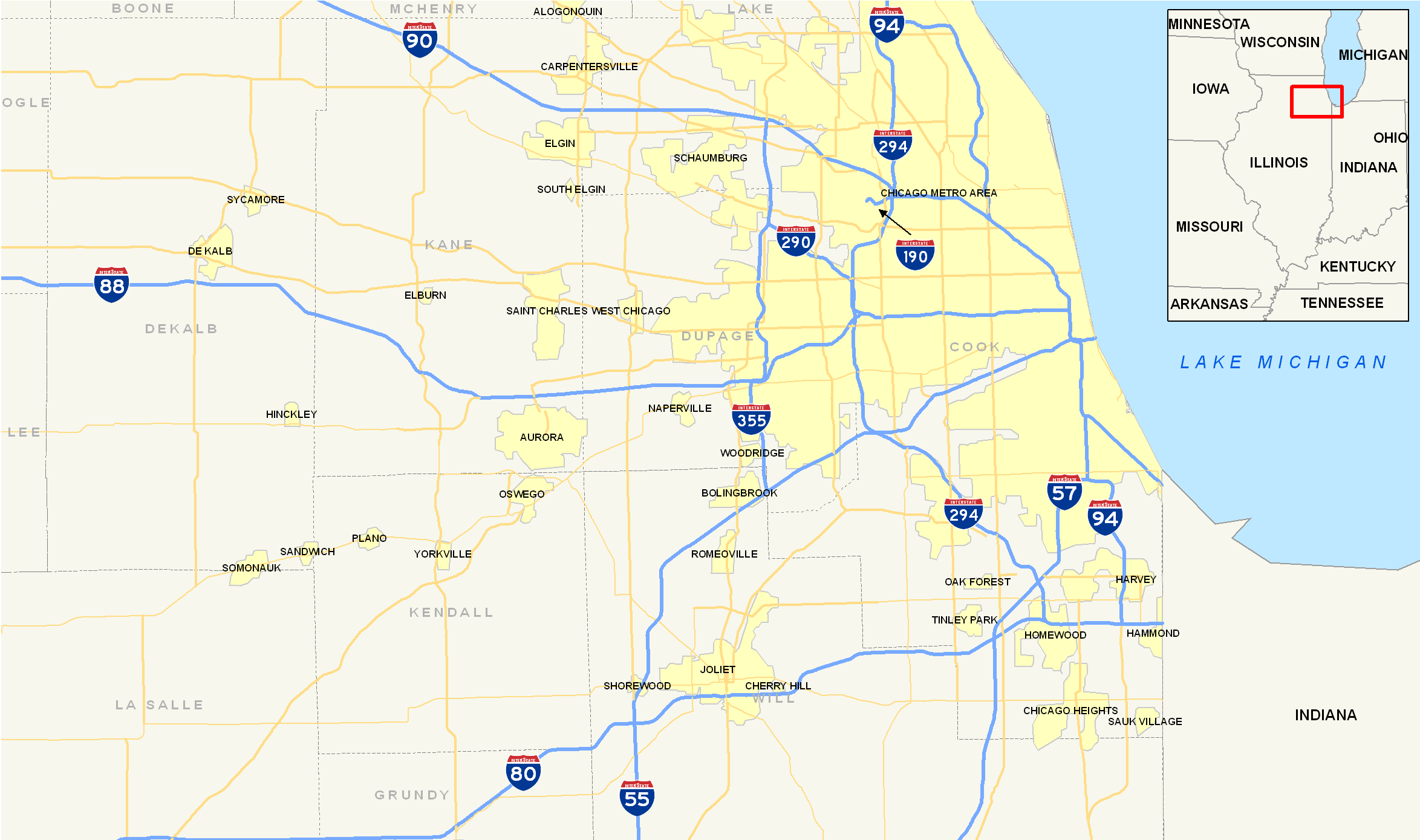
Interstates in Chicago as of June 2007

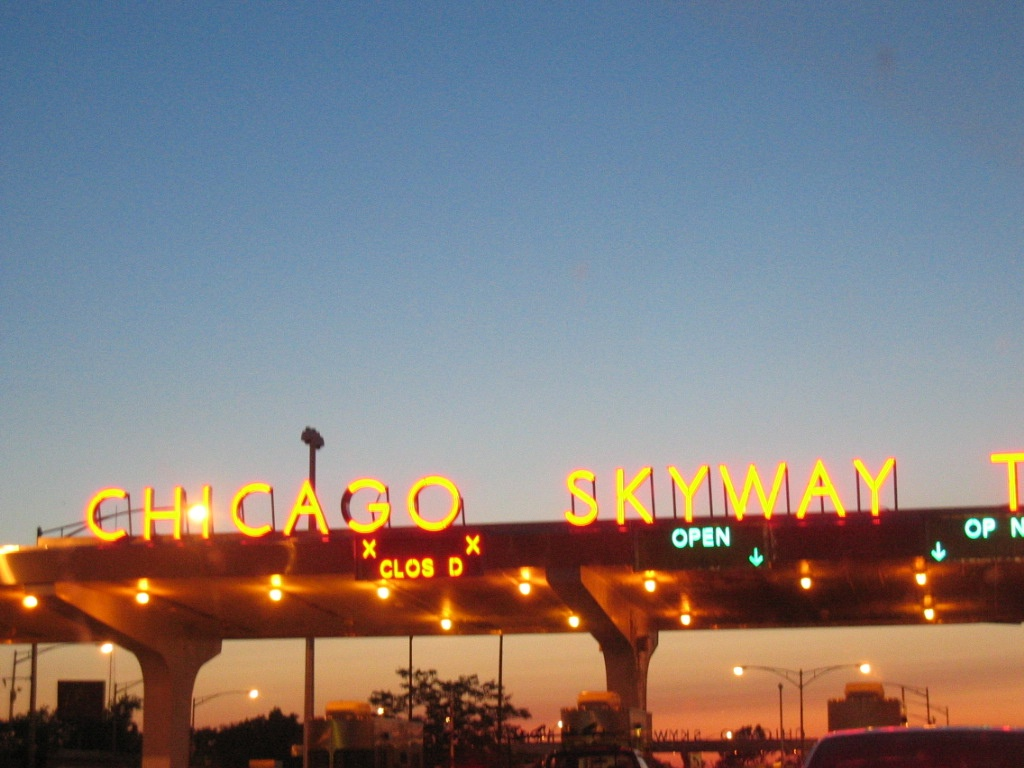
Sunset view of the Chicago Skyway tollbooths at the entrance to the Chicago southbound city limits

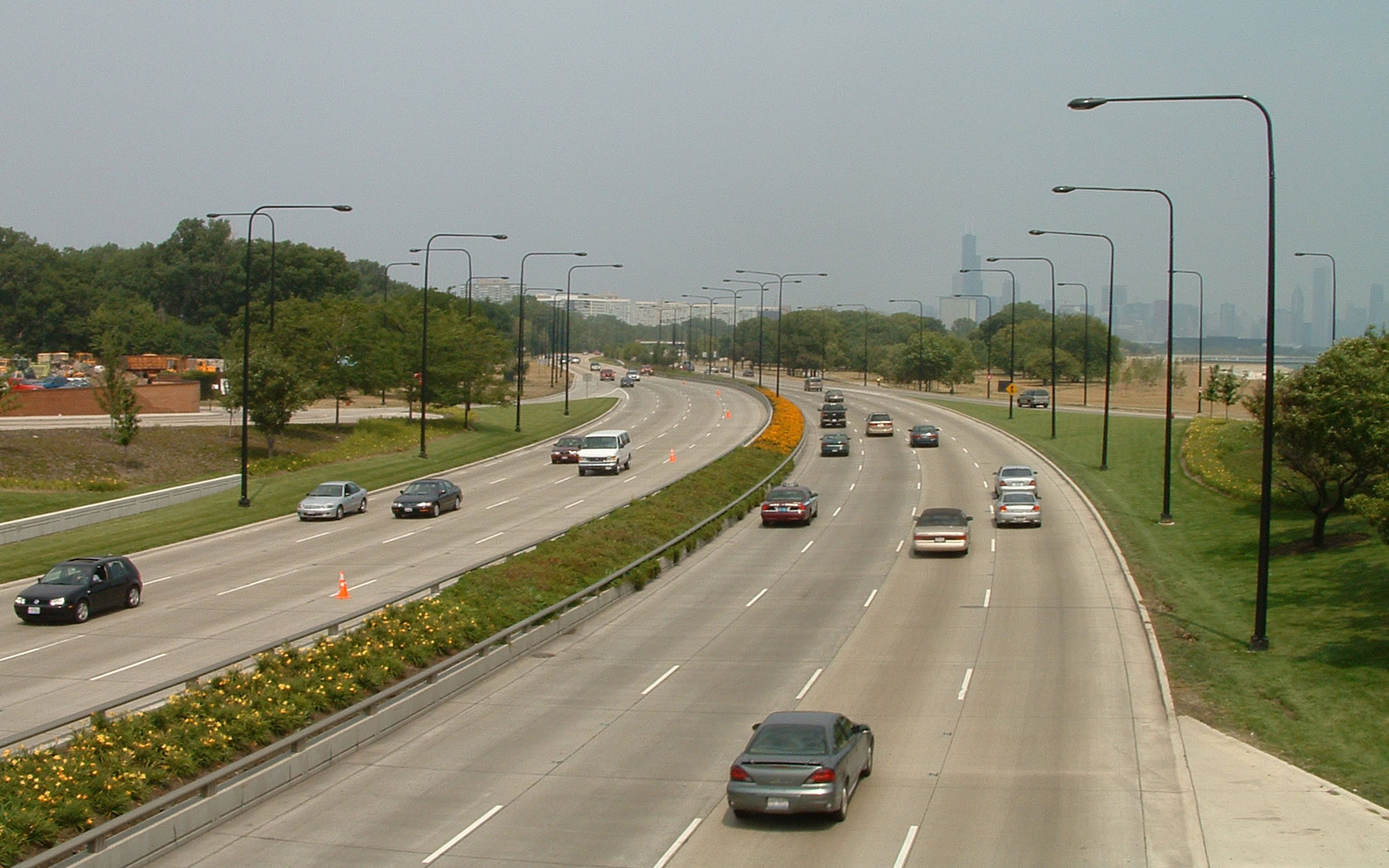
South Lake Shore Drive, looking north towards downtown.

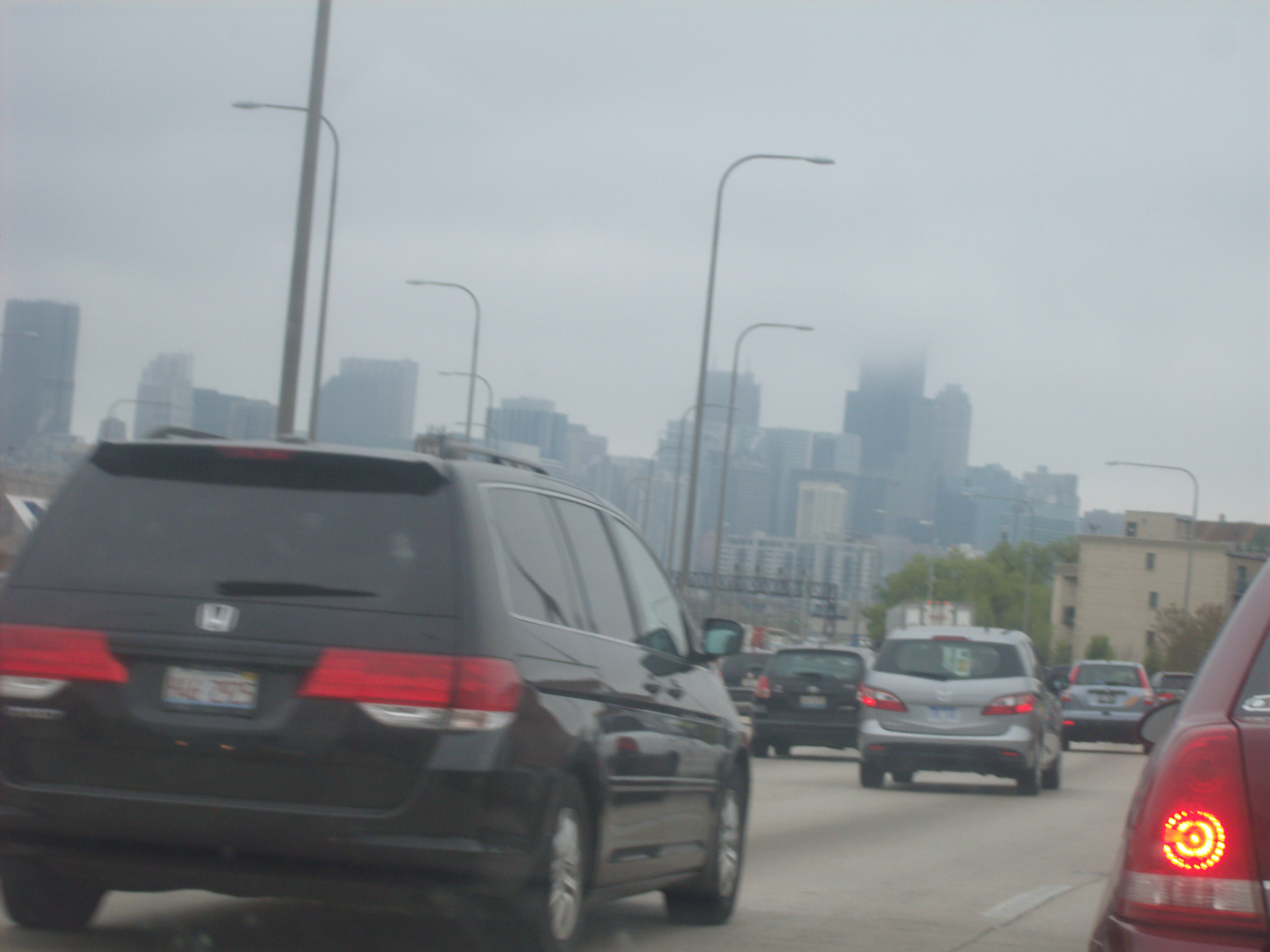
Traffic going southbound on the Kennedy Expressway on a foggy day.

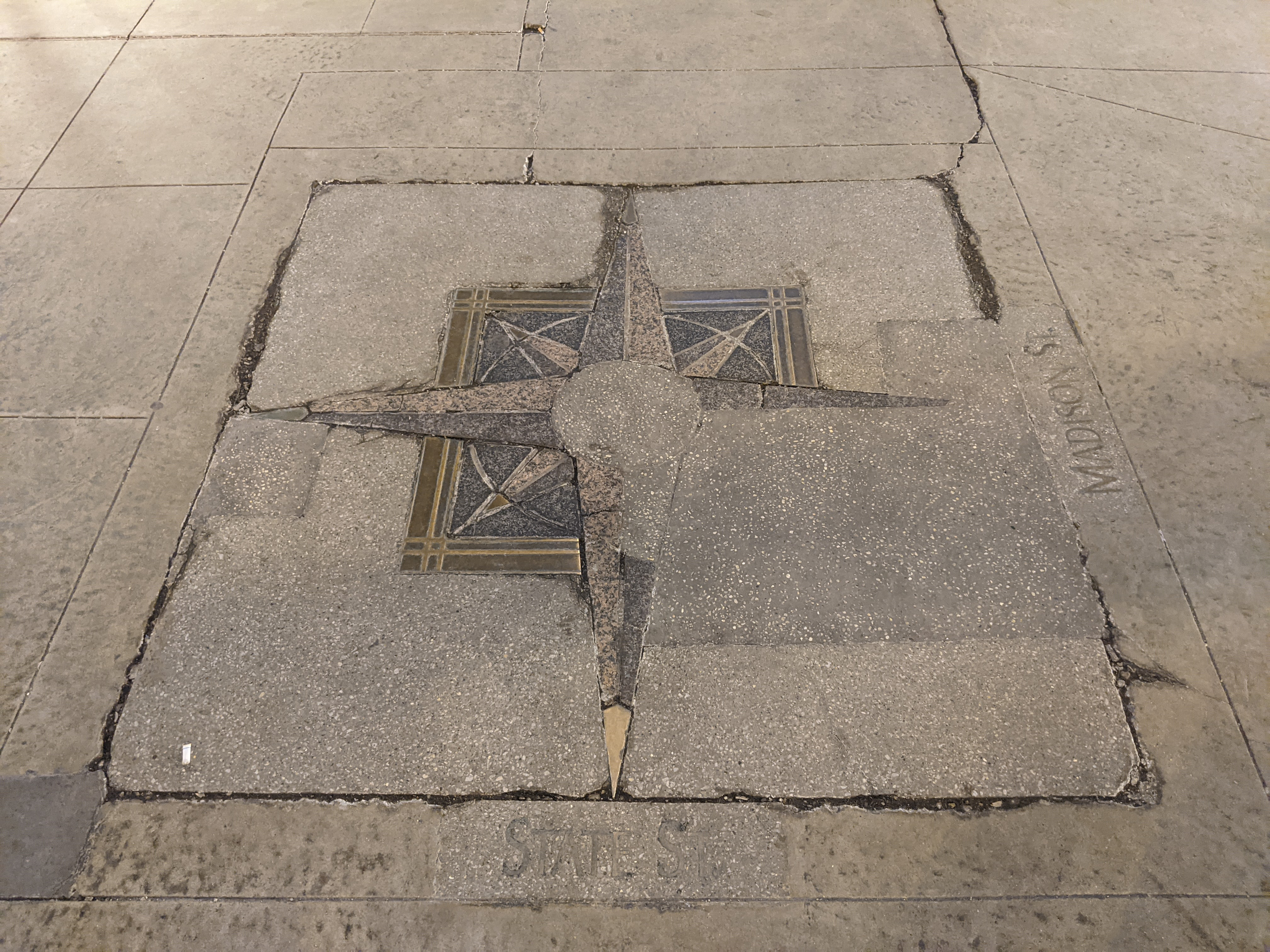
The intersection of Madison St and State St is regarded as the "zero-zero point" of Chicago.

== See also ==
- Chicago Department of Transportation
- Chicago Pedway
- Chicago Tunnel Company
- Cycling in Chicago
- Horatio G. Loomis
- LaSalle Street Tunnel
- Matthew Laflin
- Philip Maxwell
- Philo Carpenter
- Van Buren Street Tunnel
- Washington Street Tunnel (Chicago)
