= Tri-State Highway =

- Kingery Expressway, Borman Expressway

Route information
- Maintained by IDOT, INDOT
- Length: 18.46 mi (29.71 km) Kingery: 3 mi (5 km); Borman: 15.46 mi (24.88 km)

Major junctions
- West end: I-80 Toll / I-294 Toll / I-94 / IL 394 near Thornton, IL
- I-65 in Gary, IN
- East end: I-80 / I-90 / Indiana Toll Road / I-94 in Lake Station, IN

Location
- Country: United States
- Counties: Cook, Lake

Highway system
- Interstate Highway System; Main; Auxiliary; Suffixed; Business; Future

The Tri-State Highway was the designation for an 18 mile expressway in the Chicago metropolitan area. The original designations for the expressway were Interstate 80, 90, and 294, as well as a portion of U.S. Route 6. It connects the Tri-State Tollway, Bishop Ford Freeway, and Illinois Route 394 in the west to the Indiana Toll Road in the east.

In 1953, the Tri-State Highway was renamed. The road that was once part of the Tri-State Highway is now:

- The Kingery Expressway in Illinois
- The Borman Expressway in Indiana
