= I-394 =

I-394, I394, or i394 may refer to:

- Interstate 394
- Illinois Route 394
- IEEE 1394
