= 159th Street (Chicago) =

Street in Chicago

159th Street (162nd Street)
- 9th Street (Lockport only); River Oaks Drive (Calumet City only); 165th Street (Indiana only); Renwick Road (Plainfield only)
- Interactive map of 159th Street (162nd Street)
- Part of: IL 7 / US 6
- Length: 25.6 mi (41.2 km)
- Location: Chicago Southland
- West end: Historic US 66 / IL 7 / IL 53 (Broadway, Independence Boulevard) in Lockport
- East end: US 6 / IL 83 (Torrence Avenue) in Calumet City

159th Street is a major east–west street in the southern suburbs of Chicago. It runs east from Thornton Street in Lockport, crossing Interstate 355 (Veterans Memorial Tollway) in Lockport, Interstate 57 in Markham, Interstate 294 (Tri-State Tollway) in Harvey and Interstate 94 (Bishop Ford Freeway) in South Holland, on its way to its east end at U.S. Route 6 and Illinois Route 83 (Torrence Avenue) in Calumet City. The road carries no routes from Hopkins Road to Broadway, Independence Boulevard, Illinois Route 7 from Thornton Street to Wolf Road, and carries U.S. Route 6 from Wolf Road to Torrence Avenue, and no routes again from Torrence Avenue to Cline Avenue. The street intersects 4 Interstate Highways. Interstate 355, Interstate 57, Interstate 294, and Interstate 94.

== Route description ==
159th Street begins at Thornton Street in Lockport, where it continues west as 9th Street (Joliet address system) and where 159th Street starts at Historic US 66 / IL 53 (Broadway, Independence Boulevard) and the road itself ends at Hopkins Road as Wheeler Road. From here until Wolf Road, the street carries IL 7. It travels east, exactly 19 miles south of Madison Street for its entire route. In Lockport, 159th Street intersects I-355 (Veterans Memorial Tollway). In Orland Park, Illinois Route 7 continues north on Wolf Road, while 159th Street picks up US 6 from Wolf Road, for which it carries for the remainder of its route. Two miles further east (still in Orland Park), the road intersects US 45 (LaGrange Road/96th Avenue). On the border between Orland Park and Tinley Park, 159th Street intersects CR W32 (80th Avenue) Shortly After, it intersects IL 43 (Harlem Avenue). In Oak Forest, the road intersects IL 50 (Cicero Avenue). Continuing east, on the border between Oak Forest and Markham, 159th Street intersects Pulaski Road/Crawford Avenue, Kedzie Avenue and major interstate highways. The first is I-57 (Dan Ryan Expressway West Leg) in Markham. Shortly after, it intersects I-294 (Tri-State Tollway) in Harvey. While still in Harvey, the street intersects IL 1 (Halsted Street). Still in Harvey, When the road passes Wallace Avenue, 159th Street becomes 162nd Street. In South Holland, 159th Street intersects I-94 (Bishop Ford Freeway/Dan Ryan Expressway East Leg). 159th Street finally ends at IL 83 in Calumet City, also known as Torrence Avenue. U.S. Route 6 continues south on Torrence Avenue. The road continues east as River Oaks Drive. When it enters Indiana, River Oaks Drive becomes 165th Street. in Hammond, The Road intersects US 41 (Calumet Avenue). Shortly after, it intersects SR 152 (Indianapolis Boulevard). Shortly after again, it intersects Kennedy Avenue. On the border between Hammond and Gary, The road itself finally ends at a cul-de-sac west of SR 912 (Cline Avenue).

== 162nd Street ==
From Wallace Avenue in Harvey to Interstate 94 in South Holland, 159th Street is actually called 162nd Street. Other numbered streets in this area also change designation. For example, 157th Street becomes 160th Street, 158th Street becomes 161st Street, 160th Street becomes 163rd Street, 161st Street becomes 164th Street, 162nd Street becomes 165th Street, 163rd Street becomes Taft Drive (166th Street), 167th Street becomes Armory Drive (170th Street), and so on.

== Major intersections ==
=== Thornton Street to Torrence Avenue ===
County	Location	mi	km	Destinations	Notes
Will	Lockport	0.0	0.0	IL 171 (State Street)	Western terminus
Will	Lockport	1.0	1.6	IL 7 west (9th Street)	Start of IL 7 concurrency
Will	Lockport	2.2	3.5	I-355 Toll – Northwest Suburbs	I-355 exit 4
Will	Homer Glen	3.9	6.3	CR 4 (Cedar Road)	
Will	Homer Glen	6.4	10.3	CR 16 north (Bell Road)	Southern terminus of CR 16
Cook	Orland Park	8.4	13.5	IL 7 north (North Wolf Road) / US 6 south (South Wolf Road)	End of IL 7 concurrency, start of US 6 concurrency
Cook	Orland Park	10.4	16.7	US 45 (LaGrange Road)	
Cook	Orland Park	12.4	20.0	CR W32 (80th Avenue)	
Cook	Orland Park	13.4	21.6	IL 43 (Harlem Avenue)	
Cook	Oak Forest	16.4	26.4	IL 50 (Cicero Avenue)	
Cook	Markham	17.8	28.6	I-57 – Chicago, Memphis	I-57 exit 348
Cook	Markham	19.5	31.4	I-294 Toll – Wisconsin, Indiana	I-294 exit 6
Cook	Harvey	21.6	34.8	IL 1 (Halsted Street)	
Cook	South Holland	24.2	38.9	I-94 – Wisconsin, Indiana	I-94 exit 73
Cook	Calumet City	25.6	41.2	US 6 south / IL 83 (Torrence Avenue)	End of US 6 concurrency, eastern terminus
1.000 mi = 1.609 km; 1.000 km = 0.621 mi: Concurrency terminus; Tolled
