= IL-7 =

IL-7 or IL 7 can refer to:

- Interleukin 7
- Illinois's 7th congressional district
- Illinois Route 7
