= Torrence Avenue =

Street in Illinois

- 2628 East
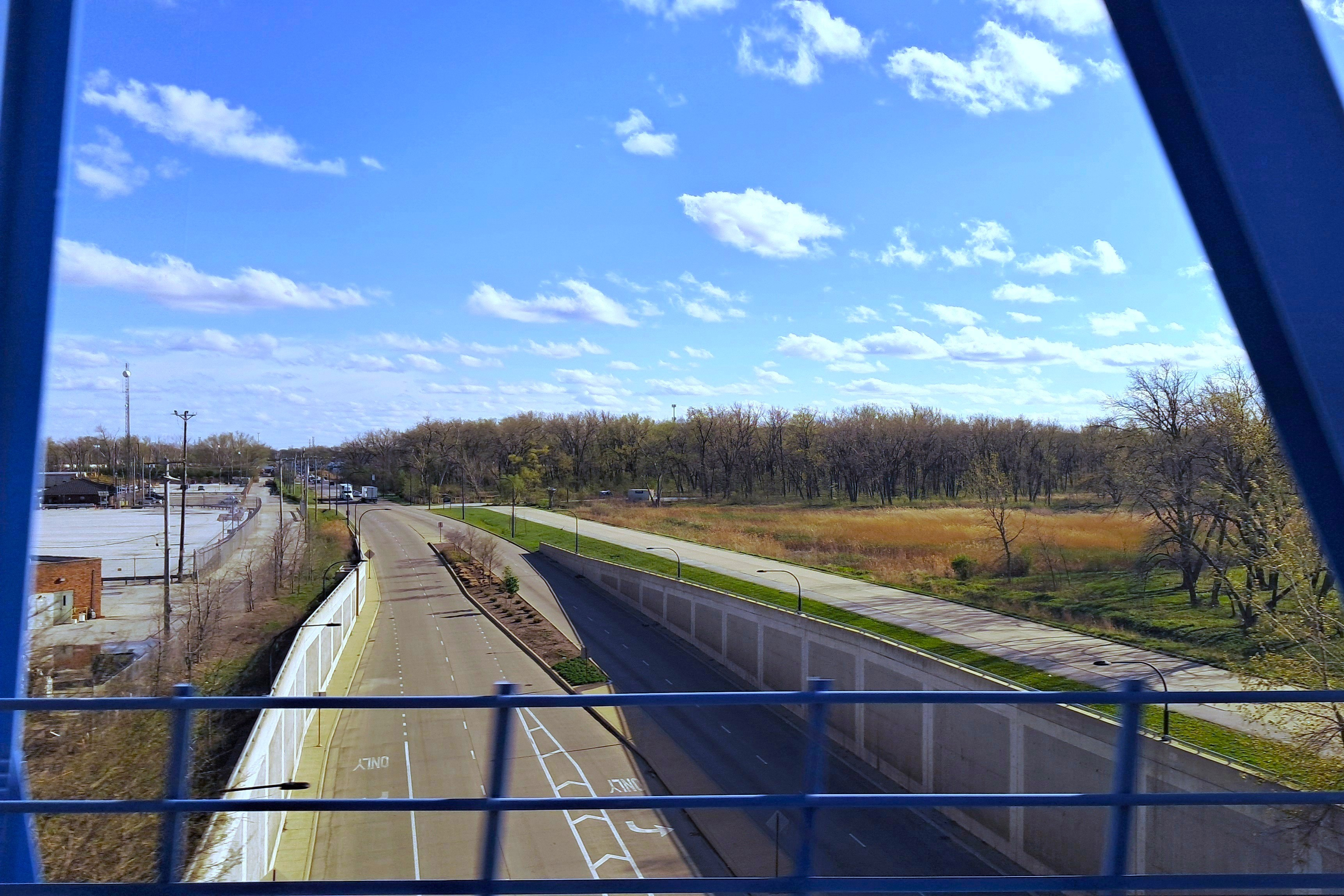
- Torrence Avenue, as viewed from the South Shore Line
- Part of: US 6 / IL 83
- Length: 0.93 miles (1.50 km) (southern segment); 17.45 miles (28.08 km) (northern segment); 18.38 miles (29.58 km) (total)
- Location: Chicago
- South end: Richton Road in Crete
- North end: Cul-de-sac at 9500 South, just south of US 12 / US 20 (95th Street) in Chicago

Torrence Avenue is a major north–south street in the South Side of Chicago, as well as its southern suburbs. It marks 2628 East in the Chicago address system, being located slightly more than 3 1/4 miles (5.2 km) east of State Street. The road runs north from Richton Road in Crete to Steger Road at the Will–Cook county line in Sauk Village. From there, its northern segment begins just west of here. Torrence Avenue continues north, intersecting Interstate 80 (I-80) and I-94 (Kingery Expressway) in Lansing. From here, the road goes north until ending just south of 95th Street (U.S. Route 12 (US 12) and US 20). The road carries Illinois Route 83 (IL 83) from Glenwood Dyer Road in Lynwood to Sibley Boulevard in Calumet City, as well as carrying US 6 from the Kingery Expressway to 159th Street.

== Route description ==
Torrence Avenue begins at Richton Road in Crete. It continues in the north-northeast direction for just under a mile until ending at Steger Road (the Will–Cook county line).

Torrence Avenue resumes just west of here, still on Steger Road. In Sauk Village, the road intersects US 30 (Lincoln Highway). Further north in Glenwood, Torrence Avenue picks up IL 83 at Glenwood Dyer Road. In Lansing, Torrence Avenue intersects US 6 and I-80/I-94 (Kingery Expressway). At this point, US 6 also follows Torrence Avenue. At 159th Street in Calumet City, US 6 continues west. While still in Calumet City, IL 83 splits off and follows Sibley Boulevard. At 138th Street, Torrence Avenue enters the city of Chicago. Torrence Avenue continues north until 9500 South, where it ends at a cul-de-sac just south of 95th Street (US 12/US 20).

== Major intersections ==
County	Location	mi	km	Destinations	Notes
Will	Willowbrook	0.0	0.0	Richton Road	Southern terminus
Cook	Sauk Village	2.4	3.9	Lincoln Highway (Sauk Trail)	Original Lincoln Highway route
Cook	Sauk Village	3.4	5.5	US 30 / Lincoln Highway	
Cook	Lynwood	4.6	7.4	IL 83 south (Glenwood Dyer Road)	Southern end of IL 83 concurrency
Cook	Lansing	8.3	13.4	US 6 east / I-80 / I-94 (Kingery Expressway) / I-294 Toll north (Tri-State Tollway)	Southern end of US 6 concurrency
Cook	Calumet City	9.9	15.9	US 6 west (159th Street, River Oaks Drive)	Northern end of US 6 concurrency
Cook	Calumet City	11.4	18.3	IL 83 north (Sibley Boulevard)	Northern end of IL 83 concurrency
Cook	Chicago	18.3	29.5	Cul-de-sac near US 12 / US 20 (East 95th Street)	Northern terminus
1.000 mi = 1.609 km; 1.000 km = 0.621 mi: Concurrency terminus

== Transportation ==
Pace bus route 358 runs along Torrence Avenue for the majority of its route; route 358 runs from a bus terminal in Chicago Heights to Hegewisch station. Pace bus routes 353 and 364 briefly run along Torrence Avenue to wrap around a shopping mall west of the River Oaks Center. In the South Deering neighborhood, CTA bus route 71 runs along Torrence Avenue from 112th Street, where it begins/ends, to 104th Street. CTA bus routes J14, 26, and 100 all run within a short segment of Torrence Avenue between 106th Street and 100th Street.
