= Kingery Expressway =

Highway in Illinois

- Tri-State Highway
- Kingery Expressway highlighted in red

Route information
- Maintained by IDOT
- Length: 3 mi (4.8 km)
- Existed: 1953–present
- Component highways: I-80 / I-94 entire length US 6 in Lansing

Major junctions
- West end: I-80 / I-94 / I-294 / IL 394 in South Holland
- US 6 / IL 83 in Lansing
- East end: I-80 / I-94 / US 6 in Lansing

Location
- Country: United States
- State: Illinois

Highway system
- Interstate Highway System; Main; Auxiliary; Suffixed; Business; Future; Illinois State Highway System; Interstate; US; State; Tollways; Scenic

The Robert Kingery Expressway, formerly called the Tri-State Highway, is a three-mile-long (5 km), eight-lane freeway in the northeastern part of the U.S. state of Illinois. It carries Interstate 80 (I-80) and Interstate 94 (I-94) from the Illinois–Indiana border at the Borman Expressway west to Illinois Route 394 (IL 394), I-294 (the Tri-State Tollway), and the southern end of the Bishop Ford Freeway (where I-94 turns north to downtown Chicago). It also carries U.S. Route 6 (US 6) west from the Indiana state line to the US 6 exit with IL 83 (Torrence Avenue).

== Route description ==
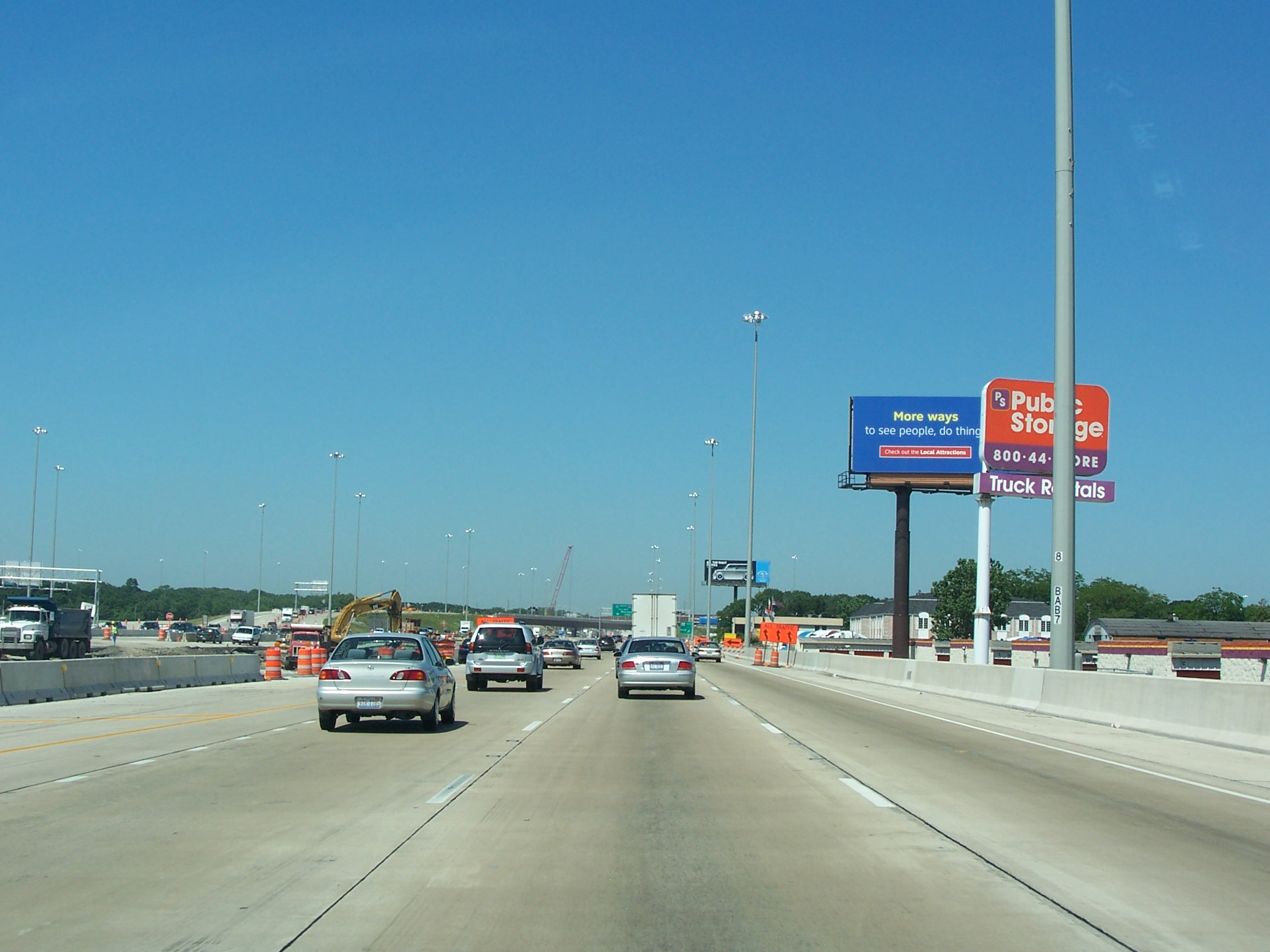
Westbound Kingery Expressway in Lansing.

The Kingery Expressway begins at an interchange with the Tri-State Tollway to the west, the Bishop Ford Freeway to the north, and IL 394 to the south. From here, the expressway heads east through Lansing. The highway then reaches its only exit, a junction with IL 83 and US 6; east of here, US 6 runs concurrently with the expressway. Past the exit, the highway continues east; it briefly curves east-southeast before crossing into Indiana and becoming the Borman Expressway.

== History ==
The Tri-State Expressway opened to traffic on November 1, 1950. The highway was renamed the Kingery Expressway in 1953, two years after the death of Robert Kingery. He was a former director of the Illinois Public Works, a regional director for the Chicago Regional Planning Association, as well as a proponent of the current northeastern Illinois tollway configuration until his death in 1951. The expressway was rebuilt in 2005–2007 to add traffic lanes and better accommodate the large amount of truck traffic that travels between Chicago and all points east and southeast. Construction was completed in July 2007. Among the improvements is the separation of traffic heading to the Bishop Ford Freeway and Torrence Avenue, with the westbound split for the Bishop Ford east of Torrence near Burnham Avenue, and an eastbound collector-distributor lane allowing a right hand exit from either I-80 or I-94 eastbound to Torrence without having to cross expressway through lanes. The Southland Interchange with the Bishop Ford Freeway, IL 394, and the Tri-State Tollway was also rebuilt and reconfigured.

== Exit list ==
The entire route is in Cook County.

Location	mi	km	Exit	Destinations	Notes
South Holland	160.40	258.14	–	I-80 Toll west / I-294 Toll north (Tollway)	Southern terminus of I-294
Lansing	161.62	260.10	161	US 6 west / IL 83 (Torrence Avenue)	Western end of US 6 concurrency
Lansing	162.51	261.53	160	I-94 west / IL 394 south – Chicago, Danville	Eastern terminus of I-94 (Bishop Ford Freeway); northern terminus of IL 394
Lansing	163.41	262.98	–	I-80 east / I-94 east / US 6 east	Continuation into Indiana as the Borman Expressway
1.000 mi = 1.609 km; 1.000 km = 0.621 mi: Concurrency terminus
