= Illinois Route 394 =

State highway in Will and Cook Counties, Illinois, US

Illinois Route 394
- Calumet Expressway
- IL 394 highlighted in red

Route information
- Maintained by IDOT
- Length: 14.63 mi (23.54 km)
- Existed: 1965–present
- History: Signed as IL 1 1957–1964

Major junctions
- South end: IL 1 in Crete
- US 30 in Ford Heights
- North end: I-80 Toll / I-94 / I-294 Toll in South Holland

Location
- Country: United States
- State: Illinois
- Counties: Will, Cook

Highway system
- Illinois State Highway System; Interstate; US; State; Tollways; Scenic
| ← IL 390 | → I-474 |

Illinois Route 394 (IL 394), also known as the Calumet Expressway, is a 14.6-mile-long (23.5 km) four-lane state highway that travels north from a junction with IL 1 south of Crete to an interchange in South Holland with Interstate 294/Interstate 94/Interstate 80 (I-294/I-94/I-80, Tri-State Tollway/Bishop Ford Freeway; this route is an extension of, but not part of the latter freeway). Although not an Interstate Highway, Illinois 394 is an Interstate-standard highway from its junction with Sauk Trail at Sauk Village to its northern terminus at the I-294/I-94/I-80 interchange in South Holland. IL 394 functions as a bypass of IL 1 to the west, of which it was formerly part, and provides access to southern suburbs of Chicago.

== Route description ==
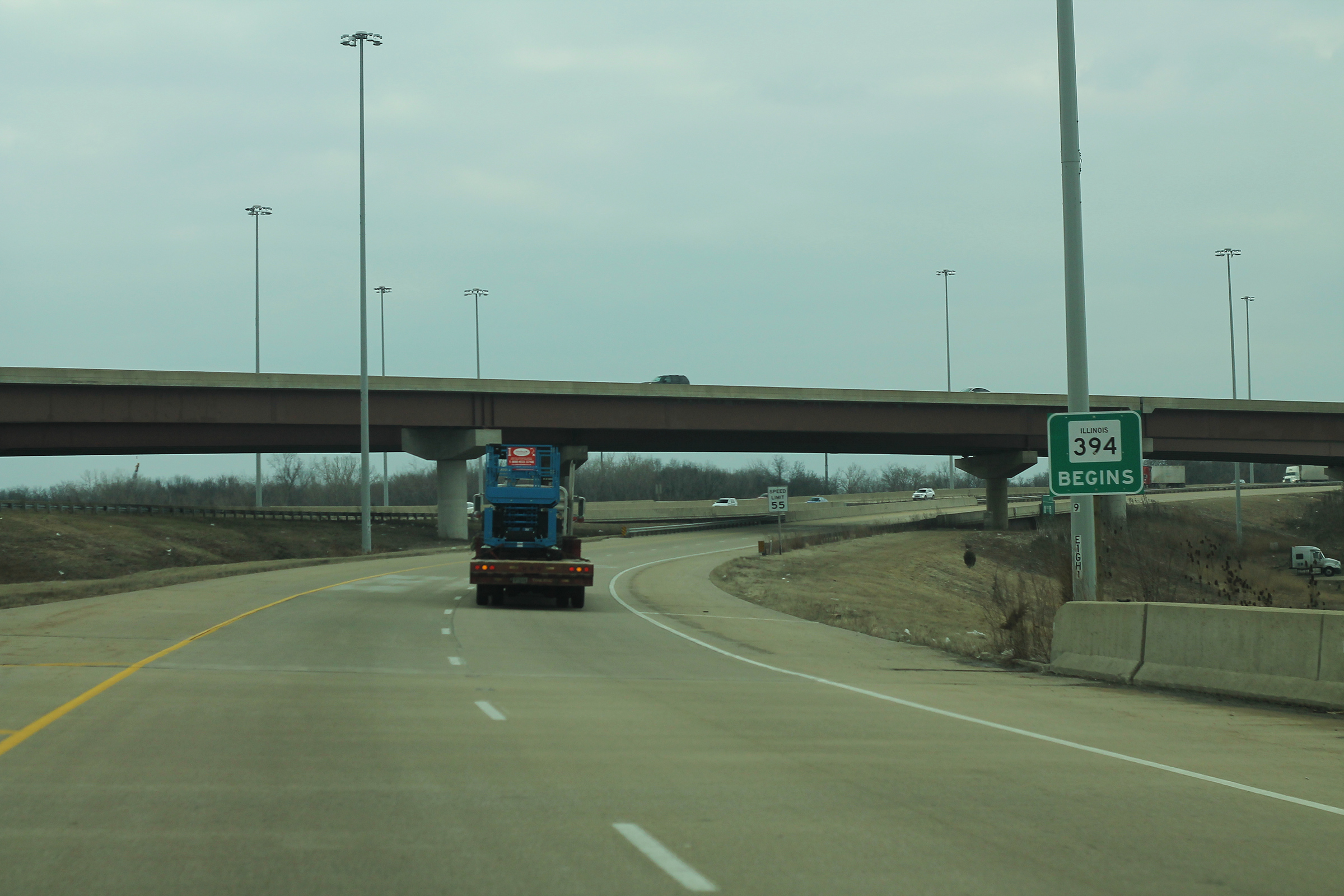
Northern terminus of IL 394 at a combination interchange

IL 394 begins as a four-lane arterial at a junction with IL 1 south of Crete, continuing as through traffic from IL 1 north. The highway curves to the east before assuming a north–south alignment, running parallel to IL 1 to the east, heading north as a surface street arterial, before becoming an Interstate-standard freeway at an intersection with Sauk Trail in Sauk Village. Shortly thereafter, the freeway meets U.S. Highway 30 (US 30, Lincoln Highway) in Ford Heights. Continuing northward, IL 394 ends at an interchange with I-294/I-94/I-80 (Tri-State Tollway/Bishop Ford Freeway) interchange in South Holland.

== History ==
Before taking the IL 394 designation, the route was a former alignment of IL 1. In the 1950s, a freeway, then known as the Calumet Expressway, was constructed south of Chicago as an extension of Doty Avenue. There were traffic lights at the intersections of Doty with 111th, 115th, and 130th, but interchanges were built in the early 1960s. The expressway was originally designated as IL 1, Alternate US 30, and certain portions as US 6 and IL 83. By 1964, IL 1 was restored to its old alignment along Halsted Street, and US 6 and IL 83 were routed onto Torrence Avenue, while the IL 394 designation was applied to the expressway south of the portion designated as I-94. At this time, IL 1 was discontinued north of I-57. In 1962, the connection between the Calumet Expressway and Dan Ryan Expressway opened and is now signed as part of the Bishop Ford. In 1996, the Calumet Expressway was renamed in honor of Bishop Louis Henry Ford, the leader of the Church of God in Christ who had died the previous year.

In 2006 and 2007, IL 394 was reconstructed north of Glenwood–Dyer Road as part of the massive Kingery Expressway reconstruction effort. The intersection with I-80, I-94 and I-294 was improved. In the southbound direction, the ramps were rebuilt, with a gentler left-exit curve for I-94 to travel from the Bishop Ford to the Kingery Expressway. The cloverleaf-style ramps to southbound IL 394 were replaced with a flyover and the distributor leg of a collector–distributor ramp from eastbound I-80/I-294. In the northbound direction, a dangerous ramp to eastbound I-80/I-94 was replaced with a ramp to a set of collector–distributor lanes, intended for US 6 and IL 83 (Torrence Avenue). A cloverleaf ramp from eastbound I-80/I-294 was replaced with a flyover, and the merge area where IL 394 terminates was improved. (The I-94 ramp itself has been moved nearly a mile [1.6 km] east to before Torrence Avenue). These improvements were completed in June 2007.

== Exit list ==
| County | Location | mi | km | Destinations | Notes |
|---|---|---|---|---|---|
| Will | Crete | 0.00 | 0.00 | IL 1 (Dixie Highway) | |
| Cook | Ford Heights | 9.20 | 14.81 | US 30 / Lincoln Highway | Southern end of freeway |
| Cook | Lynwood | 11.10 | 17.86 | Glenwood–Dyer Road | |
| Cook | South Holland–Lansing line | 14.63 | 23.54 | I-80 east / I-94 east (Kingery Expressway) – Indiana I-80 Toll west / I-294 Toll north (Tri-State Tollway) – Iowa, Wisconsin I-94 west (Bishop Ford Freeway) – Chicago | I-94 continues west; Southland Interchange; I-80 west exit 160; I-94 east exit 74A; I-294 south exit 0 |
1.000 mi = 1.609 km; 1.000 km = 0.621 mi
