= Interstate 94 in Illinois =

Section of Interstate Highway in Illinois, United States

Interstate 94
- I-94 highlighted in red

Route information
- Maintained by IDOT and ISTHA
- Length: 61.53 mi (99.02 km)
- NHS: Entire route

Major junctions
- West end: I-41 / I-94 / US 41 near Zion
- I-294 Toll in Northbrook; I-90 in Chicago; I-290 / IL 110 (CKC) in Chicago; I-55 in Chicago; I-90 Toll / Chicago Skyway in Chicago; I-57 in Chicago; I-80 Toll / I-294 Toll / IL 394 in South Holland
- East end: I-80 / I-94 / US 6 at Lansing

Location
- Country: United States
- State: Illinois
- Counties: Lake, Cook

Highway system
- Interstate Highway System; Main; Auxiliary; Suffixed; Business; Future; Illinois State Highway System; Interstate; US; State; Tollways; Scenic
← IL 93	→ IL 94

Interstate 94 (I-94) generally runs north–south through the northeastern portion of the US state of Illinois, in Lake and Cook counties. It is signed east–west in Illinois in accordance with its general alignment across the country, with west signage aligned with northbound travel and east signage aligned with southbound travel. I-94 in Illinois is 61.53 miles (99.02 km) long.

The William G. Edens Expressway is the main major expressway north from the Irving Park community area in Chicago to Northbrook. The expressway was named after William Grant Edens (1863–1957), a banker and early advocate for paved roads. It was the first expressway in Chicago and was opened on December 20, 1951. Only the short portion from the spur ramp to the expressway's end in Highland Park does not carry I-94. It has three lanes in each direction.

From the southern terminus of the Edens, I-94 follows part or all of several other named highways; joining I-90 on the Kennedy Expressway and the Dan Ryan Expressway through the center of Chicago, following the Bishop Ford Freeway through the southside of Chicago to I-80, where it joins the Kingery Expressway before entering Indiana.

== Route description ==
The control cities for I-94 generally are Wisconsin or Milwaukee to the north and west, Chicago or the Chicago Loop for those heading to the central portion, and Indiana to the south and east.

=== Wisconsin to Downtown Chicago ===
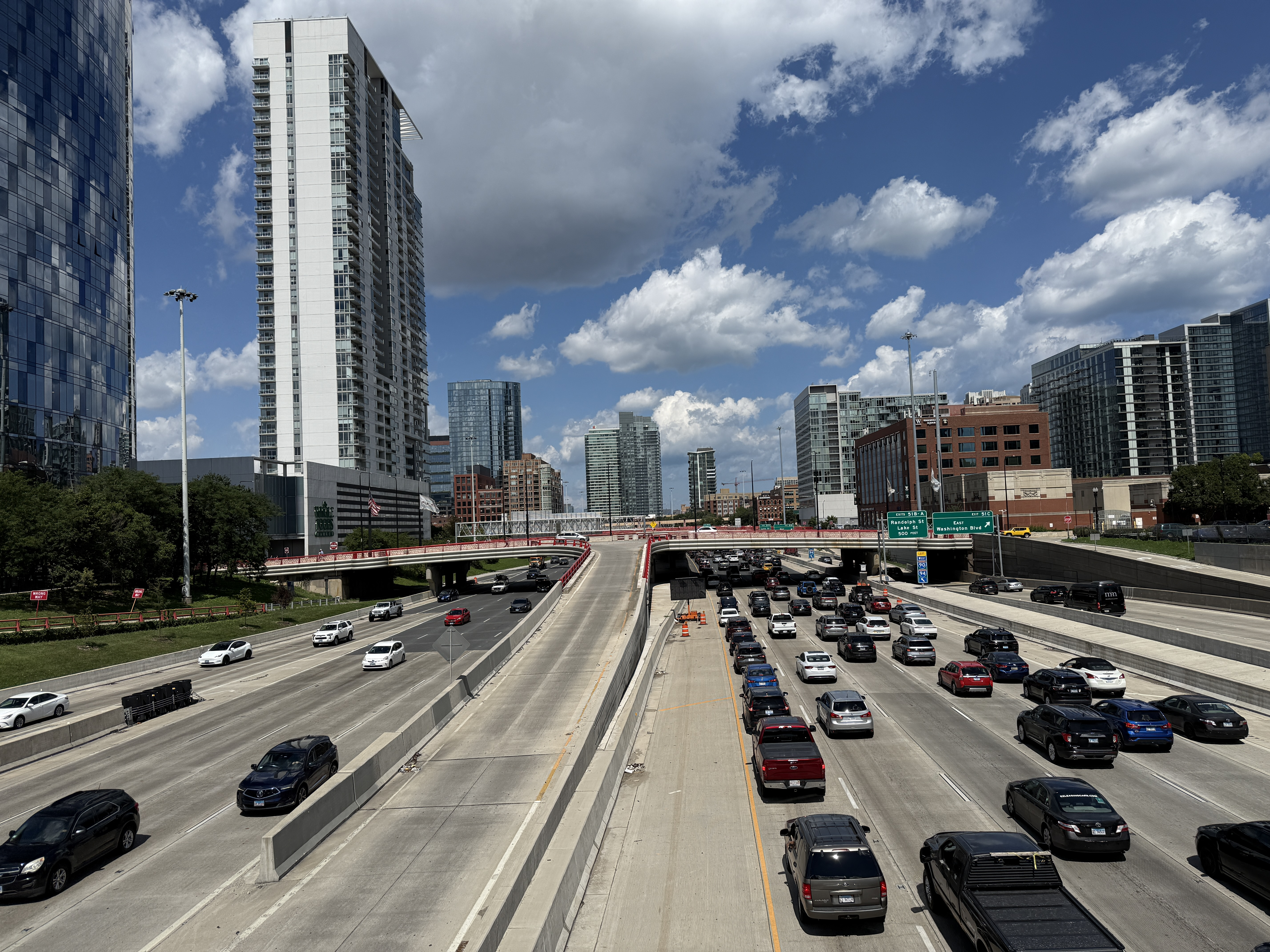
I-90/I-94 westbound on the Kennedy Expressway in Chicago

I-94 traverses rural and suburban areas in Lake County and the length of the city of Chicago, running just west of the Chicago Loop on the Kennedy Expressway, and serves Six Flags Great America, the Gurnee Mills mall, extensive office developments and residential districts in southern Lake County and the North Shore region of Cook County, and Westfield Old Orchard.

Entering Illinois from Wisconsin, I-94 becomes the Tri-State Tollway just after exit 1B (Skokie Highway), with eight lanes (four in each direction), until just north of Deerfield Road where it widens further to 10 lanes as it approaches I-294 and the Edens Spur. This is where three lanes for the Tri-State Tollway branch off and begin I-294 while two lanes for I-94 head east onto the Edens Spur which only has four lanes total (two in each direction).

The highway turns south and widens back to six lanes as it merges with US Route 41 (US 41) and becomes the Edens Expressway, and then widens to 10 lanes (four lanes in each direction plus two reversible lanes) along the Kennedy Expressway. At Ohio Street, the reversible lanes terminate and the highway has 10 lanes to the Jane Byrne Interchange, where the left lane ends and the right lane exits onto the Eisenhower Expressway (I-290).

Until 2010, mileposts along the Tri-State Tollway portion of I-94 reflected the distance from the southeastern terminus of the tollway, that led to a counterintuitive increase in the mile numbers as one proceeds "west". In 2010, the milemarkers were renumbered to indicate mileage of I-94 traveled in Illinois, increasing from the Wisconsin border to the Indiana border.

=== Downtown Chicago to Indiana ===
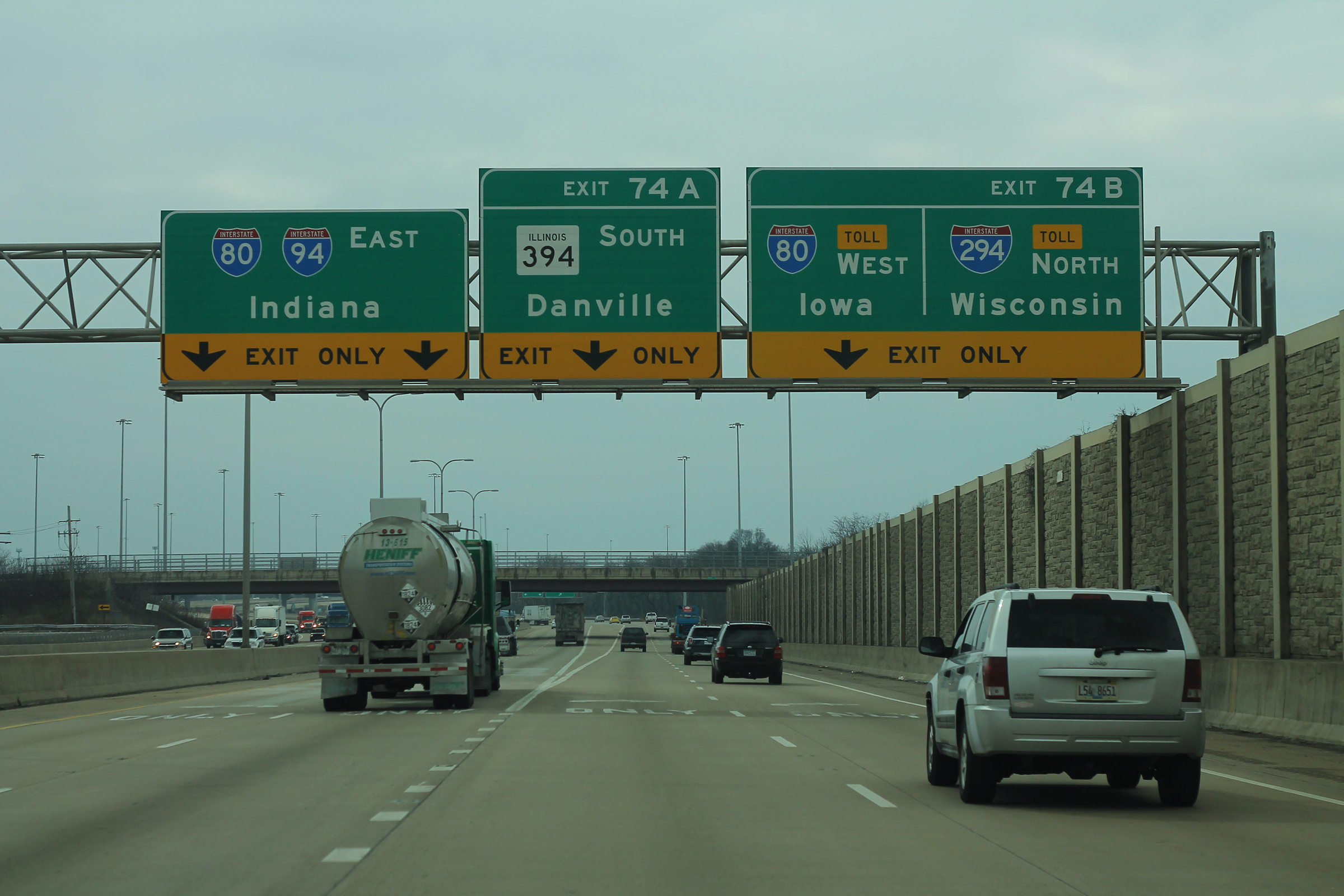
I-94 approaching a combination interchange with I-80/I-294/IL 394

South of Downtown Chicago, I-94 serves the southeast suburbs of Chicago, including Dolton, Calumet City, and South Holland, until it joins I-80 on the Kingery Expressway, which finally enters Indiana east of Lansing, Illinois.

I-94 has 10 lanes (five in each direction) from the exit ramps of the Jane Byrne Interchange to the Stevenson Expressway (I-55). It then splits into a 14-lane freeway on the Dan Ryan Expressway, with three and four lanes alternating between the local and express lanes in both directions. At the Chicago Skyway, a two-lane ramp carries traffic to I-90, leaving 10 lanes (five in each direction) running south to the I-57/I-94 junction.

From I-57, where I-94 is called the Bishop Ford Freeway, to Cottage Grove Avenue, the route has four lanes (two lanes each way), with six lanes (three lanes each way) between Michigan and Cottage Grove avenues. The freeway connection ramp to Stony Island Avenue has four lanes (two in each direction). I-94 then has six lanes (three in each direction) south to I-80, where it departs the Bishop Ford Freeway (which continues south as Illinois Route 394 [IL 394]) for the Kingery Expressway. On these ramps to and from I-80, I-94 has two lanes in each direction. On the Kingery Expressway itself, the combined I-80/I-94 route widens to eight lanes (four in each direction) to the Indiana state line.

The section including the Southland Interchange with I-80 and I-294 was reconfigured as part of the Kingery Expressway reconstruction project, completed in 2007, including four lanes south of 159th Street, with the split between I-80 and I-94 east to the left, and I-80 west, I-294 north, and IL 394 south on the right located north of the 170th Street overpass. The configuration of I-80 and I-94 is discussed in connection with the Kingery Expressway.

== History ==
=== Tri-State Tollway ===
In 1998, the Illinois Tollway removed the entire Deerfield Toll Plaza north of the I-294/I-94 merge point, then considered one of the worst snags on the tollway system. It was replaced with the Huehl Road Toll Plaza on the Edens Spur to charge traffic that followed I-94 into Chicago. Tolls were removed from the northbound exit/southbound entrance to I-294 at Lake Cook Road, while tolls at the Waukegan Toll Plaza were increased, and additional toll plazas were built on exits south of Deerfield at Lake–Cook Road, Willow Road, and Golf Road (IL 58). Toll collection facilities were also added to entrance ramps to northbound I-294 at those points.

=== Edens Expressway ===
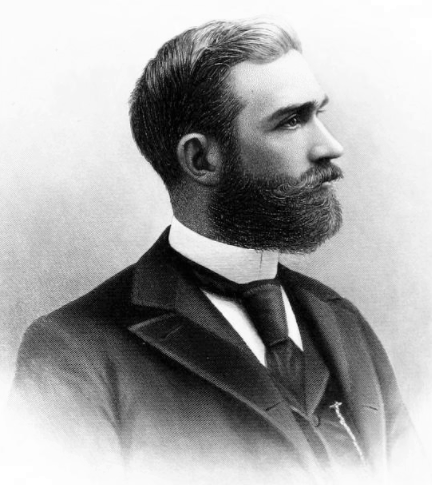
William G. Edens

The William G. Edens Expressway, historically known as the Edens Parkway and the Edens Superhighway, opened on December 20, 1951. The expressway was named for William Grant Edens (1863–1957), a banker and early advocate for paved roads. He was a sponsor of Illinois's first highway bond issue in 1918. When the expressway opened, it originally ran from Cicero Avenue north of Foster Avenue to Lake Cook Road.

The Edens Expressway section of I-94 was last rehabilitated from 1978 through 1980. From 2007 to 2009, I-94 was widened from six to eight lanes between IL 173 (Rosecrans Road) and IL 22 (Half Day Road).

On April 4, 2008, the Illinois Department of Transportation (IDOT) closed one lane in each direction for the entire length of the freeway. The closures lasted until August 2008, occurred in advance of patching and resurfacing of the mainline. In addition, the $42.8-million (equivalent to $61 million in 2024) project was to rehabilitate six bridges and improve drainage at four underpasses.

=== Bishop Ford Freeway ===
The Calumet Expressway was originally an extension of Doty Avenue. There were traffic lights at the intersections of Doty Avenue with 111th, 115th, and 130th streets, but interchanges were built in the early 1960s. The expressway was originally designated as IL 1, Alternate US 30, and certain portions as US 6 and IL 83, but IL 1 returned to Halsted Street, and US 6 and IL 83 were routed onto Torrence Avenue. In 1962, the connection between the Calumet and Dan Ryan expressways opened.

In 1996, the Calumet Expressway was renamed in honor of Bishop Louis Henry Ford, the leader of the Church of God in Christ who had died the previous year.

In 2006–2007, the portion south of 159th Street was reconstructed as part of the Kingery Expressway–Southland Interchange project. The section between 159th Street and Martin Luther King Jr. Drive was rehabilitated and resurfaced in mid- to late 2009.

== Exit list ==
County	Location	mi	km	Exit	Destinations	Notes
Lake	Newport Township	0.00	0.00		I-41 north / I-94 west / US 41 north – Milwaukee	Continuation into Wisconsin
Lake	Newport Township	0.56	0.90	1A	CR A1 (Russell Road)	Signed as exit 1 westbound
Lake	Newport Township	0.96	1.54	1B	US 41 south (Skokie Highway) to IL 173 – Waukegan I-41 ends	Eastern end of I-41/US 41 overlap; northern end of Tri-State Tollway; southern terminus of I-41; eastbound exit and westbound entrance
Lake	Zion	2.36	3.80	2	IL 173 (Rosecrans Road)	Westbound exit and eastbound entrance
Lake	Wadsworth	4.90	7.89	Waukegan Toll Plaza		
Lake	Gurnee	8.48	13.65	8	IL 132 (Grand Avenue)	Signed as exits 8A (west) and 8B (east)
Lake	Gurnee	10.21	16.43	10	IL 21 (Milwaukee Avenue)	Eastbound exit and westbound entrance
Lake	Gurnee	11.23	18.07	11	IL 120 (Belvidere Road)	Westbound exit and eastbound entrance; signed as exits 11A (east) and 11B (west)
Lake	North Chicago	13.85	22.29	13	IL 137 (Buckley Road)	Toll on eastbound exit and westbound entrance ramps
Lake	Libertyville	16.11	25.93	16	IL 176 (Rockland Road)	Westbound exit and eastbound entrance
Lake	Lake Forest	18.07	29.08	Lake Forest Oasis		
Lake	Lake Forest	19.03	30.63	19	IL 60 (Town Line Road)	Toll on eastbound exit and westbound entrance ramps
Lake	Lincolnshire	21.88	35.21	21	IL 22 (Half Day Road)	Toll on eastbound exit and westbound entrance ramps
Lake	Deerfield	24.31	39.12	24	Deerfield Road	Westbound exit and eastbound entrance; no trucks allowed on Deerfield Road east
Lake–Cook county line	Deerfield–Northbrook city line	25.32	40.75	25A	Lake Cook Road	Toll on eastbound exit and westbound entrance ramps; northbound exit and southbound entrance via I-294
Lake–Cook county line	Deerfield–Northbrook city line	24.91– 25.58	40.09– 41.17	25B	I-294 Toll south (Tri-State Tollway south) – Indiana, O'Hare	Eastbound exit and westbound entrance; northern terminus of I-294; western end of Edens Spur
Cook	Northbrook	26.44	42.55	Edens Spur Toll Plaza		
Cook	Northbrook	27.84	44.80	27	IL 43 (Waukegan Road)	Eastbound exit and westbound entrance
Cook	Northbrook	29.96	48.22	29	US 41 north (Skokie Highway) – Waukegan	Western end of US 41 overlap; westbound exit and eastbound entrance; eastern end of Edens Spur; western end of Edens Expressway
Cook	Northbrook	30.23	48.65	30	IL 68 west (Dundee Road)	Westbound exit and eastbound entrance; signed as exits 30A (west) and 30B (east); eastern terminus of IL 68
Cook	Northfield	31.92	51.37	31	Tower Road	Eastbound exit and westbound entrance
Cook	Northfield	33.04	53.17	33	Willow Road	Westbound exit and eastbound entrance; signed as exits 33A (west) and 33B (east)
Cook	Wilmette	33.95	54.64	34A	US 41 south (Skokie Road)	Eastern end of US 41 overlap; eastbound exit and westbound entrance
Cook	Wilmette	34.58	55.65	34B–C	Lake Avenue	Westbound exit and eastbound entrance; signed as exits 34B (west) and 34C (east)
Cook	Skokie	35.84	57.68	35	Old Orchard Road	
Cook	Skokie	37.38	60.16	37	IL 58 (Dempster Street)	Signed as exits 37A (west) and 37B (east), signed to Northwestern University
Cook	Skokie–Lincolnwood city line	39.87	64.16	39	Touhy Avenue	Signed as exits 39A (west) and 39B (east), westbound exit 39B via Cicero Avenue
Cook	Chicago	41.37	66.58	41A	US 14 west (Caldwell Avenue)	Westbound exit and eastbound entrance
Cook	Chicago	41.37	66.58	41B	US 14 east (Peterson Avenue)	
Cook	Chicago	41.91	67.45	41C	IL 50 south (Cicero Avenue) to I-90 west / Foster Avenue – O'Hare Field	Eastbound exit
Cook	Chicago	42.49	68.38	42	Foster Avenue	Westbound exit and entrance; eastbound entrance via Elston Ave
Cook	Chicago	43.25	69.60	43A	Wilson Avenue	
Cook	Chicago	43.26– 43.37	69.62– 69.80	43B	I-90 west (Kennedy Expressway west) – Rockford, O'Hare	Western end of I-90 overlap; westbound exit and eastbound entrance; western end of reversible express lanes; eastern end of Edens Expressway. Interchange is locally known as the Edens Junction.
Cook	Chicago	43.55	70.09	43C	Montrose Avenue	Westbound exit and eastbound entrance
Cook	Chicago	43.81	70.51	43D	Kostner Avenue	Westbound exit
Cook	Chicago	44.17– 44.40	71.08– 71.45	44A	IL 19 (Irving Park Road) / Keeler Avenue	Eastbound exit and entrance; westbound entrance
Cook	Chicago	44.40– 44.59	71.45– 71.76	44B	IL 19 (Irving Park Road) / Pulaski Road	Westbound exit and eastbound entrance
Cook	Chicago	45.12	72.61	45A	Addison Street	
Cook	Chicago	45.55	73.31	45B	Kimball Avenue	
Cook	Chicago	45.86	73.80	45C	Belmont Avenue, Kedzie Avenue	Westbound exit and eastbound entrance
Cook	Chicago	46.42	74.71	—	Sacramento Avenue	Eastbound entrance
Cook	Chicago	46.57	74.95	46A	California Avenue, Diversey Avenue	Eastbound exit and westbound entrance
Cook	Chicago	46.74	75.22	46B	Diversey Avenue, California Avenue	Westbound exit and eastbound entrance
Cook	Chicago	47.31– 47.68	76.14– 76.73	47A	Western Avenue / Fullerton Avenue	Westbound exit and eastbound entrance via Western Avenue
Cook	Chicago	47.86	77.02	47B	Damen Avenue	Westbound exit and eastbound entrance
Cook	Chicago	48.30	77.73	48A	Armitage Avenue	
Cook	Chicago	48.88	78.66	48B	IL 64 (North Avenue)	
Cook	Chicago	49.44	79.57	49A	Division Street	
Cook	Chicago	49.69	79.97	49B	Augusta Boulevard / Milwaukee Avenue	Westbound exit and eastbound entrance
Cook	Chicago	50.18	80.76	50A	Ogden Avenue	Eastbound exit and westbound entrance
Cook	Chicago	50.40	81.11	50B	Ohio Street	Eastern end of reversible express lanes; access to Navy Pier
Cook	Chicago	50.97	82.03	51A	Lake Street	Westbound exit and eastbound entrance
Cook	Chicago	51.05	82.16	51B	Randolph Street west	
Cook	Chicago	51.12	82.27	51C	Washington Boulevard east	Eastbound and westbound exit
Cook	Chicago	51.22	82.43	51D	Madison Street	
Cook	Chicago	51.31	82.58	51E	Monroe Street	Eastbound exit
Cook	Chicago	51.40	82.72	51F	Adams Street west	Eastbound exit and westbound entrance; Route 66
Cook	Chicago	51.49	82.87	51G	Jackson Boulevard east	Eastbound exit and westbound entrance
Cook	Chicago	51.50– 52.13	82.88– 83.90	51H	I-290 west / IL 110 (CKC) west (Eisenhower Expressway) – Aurora	Jane Byrne Interchange; southeastern end of Kennedy Expressway; northern end of Dan Ryan Expressway; eastern termini of I-290/IL 110
Cook	Chicago	51.50– 52.13	82.88– 83.90	51I	Ida B. Wells Drive	Jane Byrne Interchange; southeastern end of Kennedy Expressway; northern end of Dan Ryan Expressway; eastern termini of I-290/IL 110
Cook	Chicago	52.13	83.90	51J	Taylor Street / Roosevelt Road	Eastbound exit and westbound entrance
Cook	Chicago	52.35	84.25	52B	Roosevelt Road / Taylor Street	Westbound exit and eastbound entrance
Cook	Chicago	53.00	85.30	52C	18th Street	Eastbound exit and westbound entrance
Cook	Chicago	53.26	85.71	53A	Canalport Avenue / Cermak Road	Westbound exit and eastbound entrance
Cook	Chicago	53.00– 54.82	85.30– 88.22	53B; 53C	I-55 south (Stevenson Expressway) – St. Louis I-55 north (Stevenson Expressway) / 22nd Street – Lake Shore Drive, Chinatown	Signed as exits 53B (south) and 53C (north) westbound; I-55 exits 292 and 293B; Cermak Road access from westbound only; western end of express lanes
Cook	Chicago	54.94	88.42	54	31st Street	
Cook	Chicago	55.23	88.88	55A	35th Street	Guaranteed Rate Field, Illinois Institute of Technology
Cook	Chicago	55.76	89.74	55B	Pershing Road	3900 South
Cook	Chicago	56.22	90.48	56A	43rd Street	
Cook	Chicago	56.75	91.33	56B	47th Street	
Cook	Chicago	57.66	92.79	57	Garfield Boulevard	5500 South; access to Midway Airport
Cook	Chicago	58.28	93.79	58A	59th Street	Westbound exit and eastbound entrance
Cook	Chicago	58.78	94.60	58B	63rd Street	Eastbound exit and westbound entrance
Cook	Chicago	58.78– 59.11	94.60– 95.13	59A	I-90 Toll east / Chicago Skyway east to Indiana Toll Road	Eastern end of I-90 overlap; eastbound exit and westbound entrance; eastern end of express lanes
Cook	Chicago	59.36	95.53	59B	Marquette Road / 67th Street	Westbound exit and eastbound entrance
Cook	Chicago	59.87	96.35	59C	71st Street	
Cook	Chicago	60.37	97.16	60A	75th Street	Eastbound exit and westbound entrance
Cook	Chicago	60.48	97.33	60B	76th Street	Westbound exit and eastbound entrance
Cook	Chicago	60.86	97.94	60C	79th Street	
Cook	Chicago	61.36	98.75	61A	83rd Street	Eastbound exit and westbound entrance
Cook	Chicago	61.87	99.57	61B	87th Street	
Cook	Chicago	62.87	101.18	62	US 12 / US 20 (95th Street)	Eastbound exit and westbound entrance
Cook	Chicago	62.87– 63.88	101.18– 102.80		Michigan Avenue	Westbound entrance only
Cook	Chicago	62.87– 63.88	101.18– 102.80	63	I-57 south – Memphis	Northern terminus of I-57; eastern end of Dan Ryan Expressway; western end of Bishop Ford Freeway
Cook	Chicago	64.53	103.85	65	Stony Island Avenue to 95th and 103rd Streets	Eastbound exit and westbound entrance
Cook	Chicago	65.73	105.78	65	103rd Street / Stony Island Avenue	Westbound exit and eastbound entrance
Cook	Chicago	66.18	106.51	66A	111th Street	Access to Pullman Historic District
Cook	Chicago	66.73	107.39	66B	115th Street	
Cook	Chicago	68.67	110.51	68	130th Street – Illinois International Port	Signed as exits 68A (west) and 68B (east)
Cook	Chicago	69.76	112.27	69	Beaubien Woods Forest Preserve	Eastbound exit and westbound entrance
Cook	Calumet City	70.62	113.65	70	Dolton Avenue	Eastbound exit and westbound entrance; signed as exits 70A (west) and 70B (east)
Cook	Calumet City	71.42	114.94	71	IL 83 (Sibley Boulevard)	Signed as exits 71A (west) and 71B (east)
Cook	South Holland	72.96	117.42	73	US 6 (159th Street)	Signed as exits 73A (west) and 73B (east)
Cook	South Holland–Thornton Township line	73.97– 74.89	119.04– 120.52	74B	I-80 Toll west / I-294 Toll north (Tri-State Tollway) – Iowa, Wisconsin	Eastbound exit and westbound entrance; I-294 exit 0
Cook	Thornton Township–Lansing line	73.97– 74.89	119.04– 120.52	74A	IL 394 south (Calumet Expressway) – Danville	No exit number westbound
Cook	Lansing	75.62	121.70	161	US 6 west / IL 83 (Torrence Avenue)	Exit number follows I-80 mileage; no westbound exit
Cook	Lansing	76.51	123.13	—	I-80 Toll west / I-294 Toll north (Tri-State Tollway) – Iowa, Wisconsin US 6 west / IL 83 (Torrence Avenue)	Western end of I-80/US 6 overlap; westbound left exit and eastbound left entrance; eastern end of Bishop Ford Freeway; western end of Kingery Expressway; southern terminus of I-294; I-80 exit 160
Cook	Lansing	77.41	124.58		I-80 east / I-94 east / US 6 east (Borman Expressway) – Toledo, Detroit	Continuation into Indiana; eastern end of Kingery Expressway
1.000 mi = 1.609 km; 1.000 km = 0.621 mi: Concurrency terminus; Incomplete access; Tolled; Route transition

== Related routes ==
I-94 has one auxiliary routes in Illinois: Interstate 294.

Another auxiliary route, I-494, was originally planned to serve as a loop in Chicago and follow Lake Shore Drive along Lake Michigan. The first iteration of I-494 was dropped in response to local opposition. Portions of the old I-494 exist as US 41 (Lake Shore Drive) and the Ohio Street connector. In addition, I-494 was also planned at one point to be a western bypass of Chicago, as the Crosstown Expressway.

Interstate 94
Previous state: Wisconsin	Illinois	Next state: Indiana
