= Tri-State Tollway =

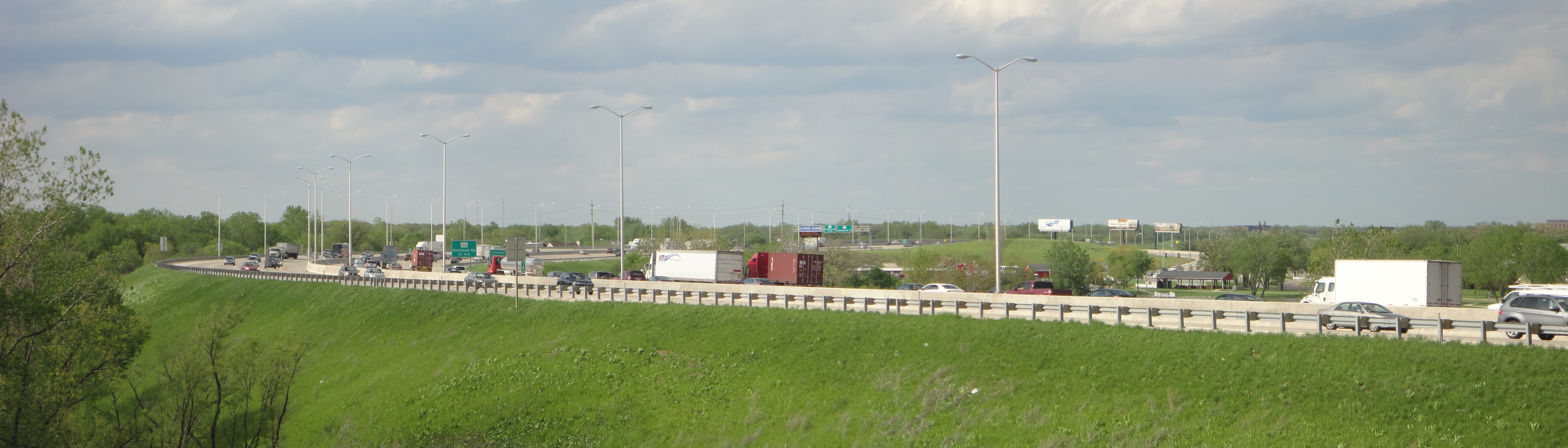
The Tri-State Tollway near the exit at Illinois Route 176

The Tri-State Tollway is a controlled-access toll road in the northeastern part of the U.S. state of Illinois. Originally U.S. Route 41 Toll, it follows:

- Interstate 94 from I-41/US 41 in Newport Township to I-94 in Northbrook;
- Interstate 294 from I-94 in Northbrook to I-294 in Hazel Crest; and
- Interstate 80 from I-294 in Hazel Crest to I-94/I-294/IL 394 in South Holland.
