= List of county roads in Kane County, Illinois =

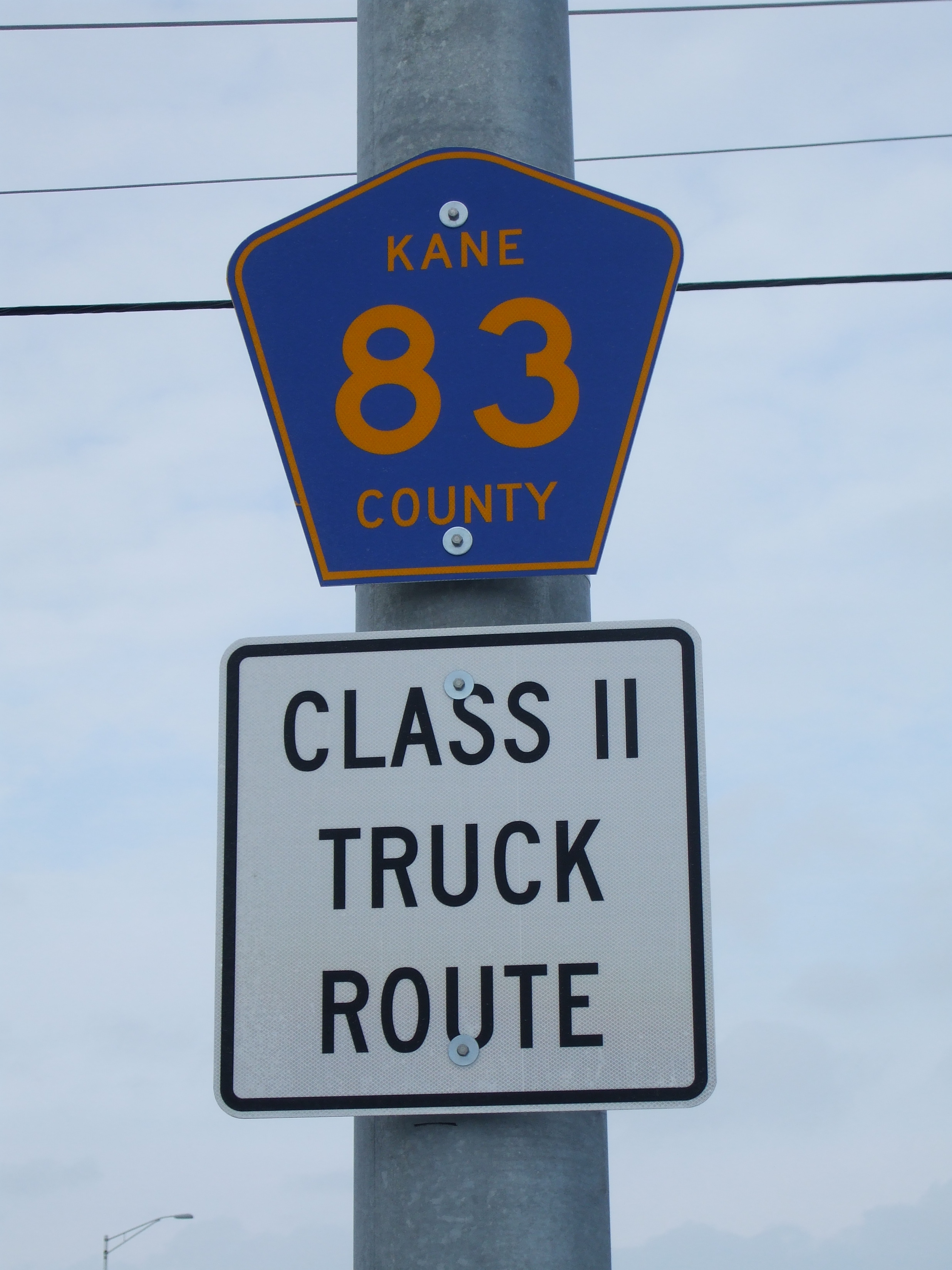
Kane County Hwy 83 shield

The Kane County Highway System is a county-maintained system of arterial county highways in Kane County, Illinois, United States. They are marked with the standard M1-6 pentagon-shaped highway marker on the base of traffic signals at intersections with other county highways. They are not marked on any freeway or tollway exits or signed with separate reassurance markers. In addition, although concurrencies of county highways exist in the county, they too are not explicitly signed as such.

== Route list ==
Number	Length (mi)	Length (km)	Southern or western terminus	Northern or eastern terminus	Local names	Formed	Removed	Notes
CR 1	—	—	CR 10 (Main Street Road)	IL 38 (Lincoln Highway)	West County Line Road	—	—	
CR 2	—	—	IL 64	Burlington city limits	Burlington Road	—	—	
CR 3	2.6	4.2	North State Street	US 20	Allen Road	—	—	Allen Road continues west as CR 45
CR 4	—	—	West Kane-DeKalb County (County Line Road)	IL 47	Perry Road, Harter Road	—	—	
CR 5	8.3	13.4	IL 47	IL 31	Silver Glen Road	—	—	
CR 6	2.4	3.9	CR 59 (Tyrrell Road)	CR 30 (Huntley Road)	Galligan Road	—	—	
CR 7	0.2	0.32	US Route 20 / Oak Street	Traffic circle with Damisch Road	Reinking Road	—	—	Shortest county highway in Kane County
CR 8	7.8	12.6	CR 10 (Main Street Road)	East Kane-DuPage county line	Fabyan Parkway	—	—	
CR 10	14.3	23.0	CR 1 (West County Line Road)	CR 34 (Randall Road)	Main Street Road	—	—	
CR 11	—	—	IL 64	Burlington city limits	Peplow Road	—	—	Southern segment
CR 11	—	—	CR 46 (Burlington Road)	IL 72	French Road	—	—	Northern segment
CR 12	—	—	US Route 20 Traffic Circle	North Huntley City Limits	Meredith Road	—	—	Marengo Road continues southeast as CR 31; western terminus is a traffic circle with US 20
CR 14	—	—	CR 41 (Keslinger Road)	Ch 27 (I.C. Trail)	Meredith Road	—	—	
CR 15	—	—	CR 78 (Bliss Road)	CR 83 (Orchard Road)	Healy Road, Tanner Road	—	—	
CR 16	—	—	CR 10 (Main Street Road)	CR 41 (Keslinger Road)	Bunker Road	—	—	
CR 17	5.9	9.5	CR 32 (Plato Road)	CR 18 (McLean Boulevard)	Bowes Road	—	—	
CR 18	0.7	1.1	West Spring Street	CR 17 (Bowes Road)	North McLean Boulevard	—	—	
CR 19	2.5	4.0	CR 77 (Kirk Road)	IL 25, CR 37 (Stearns Road)	Dunham Road	—	—	
CR 20	0.4	0.64	CR 19 (Dunham Road)	East Kane-DuPage county line	Army Trail Road	—	—	
CR 21	—	—	CR 36 (Harmony Road)	CR 34 (Randall Road)	Big Timber Road	—	—	
CR 22	8.5	13.7	Burlington city limits	US 20	Plank Road	—	—	Plank Road continues west as CR 38
CR 23	—	—	CR 1 (West County Line Road)	IL 47	Beith Road, Thatcher Road	—	—	
CR 24	13.3	21.4	US 30	CR 83 (Orchard Road)	Jericho Road	—	—	
CR 26	5	8.0	IL 47	CR 8 (Fabyan Parkway)	Hughes Road	—	—	
CR 27	—	—	IL 64	IL 47	I.C. Trail, Sauber Road, Lees Road	—	—	
CR 28	6.1	9.8	IL 64	CR 11 (Peplow Road)	McGough Road	—	—	
CR 29	3	4.8	IL 25 (Southeast River Road)	Hill Avenue	Montgomery Road	—	—	
CR 30	6.3	10.1	North Kane-McHenry county line	Sleepy Hollow Road	Huntley Road	—	—	
CR 31	14.2	22.9	West Kane-Dekalb County Line	North Huntley City Limits	Harmony Road, Marengo Road	—	—	This road can sometimes be called Riley Harmony Road or Harmony Huntley Road. Marengo Road continues northwest as CR 12.
CR 32	4	6.4	CR 2 (Burlington Road)	CR 17 (Bowes Road)	Plato Road	—	—	
CR 33	3.6	5.8	CR 32 (Plato Road)	CR 22 (Plank Road)	Rippburger Road, Russell Road	—	—	
CR 34	23.4	37.7	CR 83 (Orchard Road), CR 71 (Mooseheart Road)	North Kane-McHenry county line/North Kane-McHenry County Line Road	Randall Road	—	—	Longest county highway in Kane County
CR 35	—	—	South Kane-Kendall county line	Rhodes Street	Granart Road	—	—	
CR 36	4.1	6.6	State Street	US 20	Harmony Road, Getty Road	—	—	Roadway continues on Allen Road eastbound when Harmony Road terminates, until the intersection with State Street
CR 37	6.3	10.1	CR 34 (Randall Road)	East Kane-DuPage county line	Stearns Road	—	—	Stearns Road continues east in DuPage County
CR 38	2.6	4.2	West Kane-DeKalb county line	Burlington city limits	Plank Road	—	—	Plank Road continues east as CR 22
CR 40	1.4	2.3	US Route 20	Harmony Road(Riley Harmony Road)/CR 31	Hampshire Road, Getty Road	—	—	CR 40 has a concurrency with CR 36 on Getty Road
CR 41	13.4	21.6	CR 1 (West County Line Road)	CR 34 (Randall Road)	Keslinger Road	—	—	
CR 44	5	8.0	US 30	CR 10 (Main Street Road)	Davis Road, Swan Road	—	—	
CR 45	—	—	West Kane-DeKalb county line	CR 36 (Harmony Road)	Allen Road	—	—	
CR 46	—	—	CR 11 (French Road)	CR 45 (Allen Road)	Burlington Road, Walker Road	—	—	
CR 47	5.5	8.9	Damisch Avenue	Hoxie Avenue	Highland Avenue	—	—	Roadway continues west to Reinking Road
CR 48	4.3	6.9	CR 44 (Davis Road)	CR 4 (Harter Road)	Scott Road	—	—	
CR 49	5.8	9.3	CR 28 (McGough Road)	CR 32 (Plato Road)	Ellithorpe Road, Pease Road	—	—	
CR 51	3.4	5.5	CR 2 (Burlington Road)	CR 32 (Plato Road)	Dittman Road	—	—	
CR 56	6.4	10.3	CR 1 (West County Line Road)	IL 47	Ramm Road	—	—	
CR 59	3.3	5.3	CR 21 (Big Timber Road)	CR 6 (Galligan Road)	Tyrrell Road	—	—	
CR 61	0.3	0.48	IL 25	East Kane-Cook county line	West Bartlett Road	—	—	
CR 62	8	13	US 30	CR 41 (Keslinger Road)	Dauberman Road	—	—	
CR 69	3.4	5.5	IL 47	CR 2 (Burlington Road)	Empire Road	—	—	
CR 71	1	1.6	CR 83 (Orchard Road)	IL 31 (Lincolnway Street)	Mooseheart Road	—	—	
CR 73	3.2	5.1	CR 2 (Burlington Road)	CR 34 (Randall Road)	Bolcum Road	—	—	
CR 77	9.1	14.6	IL 56 (Butterfield Road)	CR 19 (Dunham Road)	Kirk Road	—	—	Kirk Road continues south as Farnsworth Avenue
CR 78	5.1	8.2	IL 47	CR 10 (Main Street Road)	Bliss Road	—	—	
CR 80	4.1	6.6	CR 2 (Burlington Road)	CR 17 (Bowes Road)	Corron Road	—	—	
CR 81	4	6.4	CR 41 (Keslinger Road)	IL 64	LaFox Road	—	—	
CR 83	7.5	12.1	US 30	CR 34 (Randall Road)	Orchard Road	—	—	Orchard Road continues south of US 30
CR 84	2.9	4.7	CR 8 (Fabyan Parkway)	IL 38	Kaneville Road, Peck Road	—	—	
CR 86	5.6	9.0	CR 30 (Huntley Road)	IL 62 (Algonquin Road)	Longmeadow Parkway	—	—	Opened on August 29, 2024
