= Munger Road =

Road in DuPage and Cook counties in Illinois, USA

Coordinates: 41°57′52.2″N 88°13′22.3″W

- Interactive map of Munger Road
- Part of: CR 18
- Maintained by: DuPage County, various local agencies
- Length: 4.12 mi (6.63 km)
- South end: Smith Road in Wayne
- North end: West Bartlett Road near Bartlett

Munger Road is a road in DuPage and Cook counties in Illinois, running through the villages of Bartlett and Wayne. It runs north–south for 4.12 miles (6.63 km) from West Bartlett Road to Smith Road.

The railroad crossing near Stearns Road is said to be the site of supernatural activity as noted in a 2011 movie Munger Road.

== Urban legend ==
Munger Road is claimed to be a haunted site, drawing visitors to experience supposed supernatural phenomena at a railroad crossing. According to the legend, a school bus full of children was hit by a train after becoming stuck on the tracks, killing everyone inside. Reportedly, if visitors at Munger Road sprinkle baby powder on their car bumpers and sit on the tracks with their car in neutral, the spirits of the children push the car off the tracks to safety, and their handprints can be seen in the powder. However, there are no historical records of a school bus crash at this location. The legend is believed to have originated from the 1938 South Jordan train-bus collision in Utah which was reported via wire service in newspapers across the country, leading to urban legends in several locations where it was misinterpreted as a local event.

== Major intersections ==
| County | Location | mi | km | Destinations | Notes |
|---|---|---|---|---|---|
| DuPage | Wayne | 0.0 | 0.0 | Smith Road | Southern terminus |
| DuPage | Wayne | 0.8 | 1.3 | CR 11 (Army Trail Road) | |
| DuPage | Bartlett | 2.7 | 4.3 | CR 29 (Stearns Road) / CR 18 begins | Start of CR 18 |
| DuPage–Cook county line | Bartlett | 3.4 | 5.5 | CR 18 ends | End of CR 18 |
| Cook | Bartlett | 4.1 | 6.6 | Bartlett Road | Northern terminus, continues as Naperville Road |
1.000 mi = 1.609 km; 1.000 km = 0.621 mi
