= Dunleith Township, Illinois =

Dunleith Township
- Township
- Location in Jo Daviess County

- Jo Daviess County's location in Illinois
- Coordinates: 42°28′42″N 90°36′48″W
- Country: United States
- State: Illinois
- County: Jo Daviess
- Established: March 2, 1865

Government
  - Supervisor: Vincent Hasken

Area
  - Total: 11.86 sq mi (30.7 km^{2})
  - Land: 9.53 sq mi (24.7 km^{2})
  - Water: 2.33 sq mi (6.0 km^{2}) 19.64%
- Elevation: 732 ft (223 m)

Population (2020)
  - Total: 3,543
  - Density: 372/sq mi (144/km^{2})
- Time zone: UTC-6 (CST)
  - Summer (DST): UTC-5 (CDT)
- ZIP codes: 61025
- FIPS code: 17-085-21202

Dunleith Township is one of 23 townships in Jo Daviess County, Illinois, United States. As of the 2020 census, its population was 3,543 and it contained 1,674 housing units. It was formed from Menominee Township on March 2, 1865.

== Geography ==
Dunleith Township is in the very northwest corner of Illinois, abutting Wisconsin to the north and Iowa to the west across the Mississippi River.

According to the 2021 census gazetteer files, Dunleith Township has a total area of 11.86 square miles (30.72 km^{2}), of which 9.53 square miles (24.68 km^{2}) (or 80.36%) is land and 2.33 square miles (6.03 km^{2}) (or 19.64%) is water.

Dunleith is Townships 28 (part) and 29 North, Range 2 (part) west of the Fourth Principal Meridian.

=== Cities, towns, villages ===
- East Dubuque

=== Major highways ===
- U.S. Route 20 - east towards Galena and west over the Mississippi River on the Julien Dubuque Bridge to Dubuque, Iowa
- Illinois Route 35 - a northeast–southwest route from Jct US 20 in East Dubuque to the Wisconsin state line, continuing as

=== Rivers ===
- Mississippi River

=== Lakes ===
- Frentress Lake
- Round Lake
- Switzer Lake

== Demographics ==
As of the 2020 census there were 3,543 people, 1,653 households, and 1,072 families residing in the township. The population density was 298.68 inhabitants per square mile (115.32/km^{2}). There were 1,674 housing units at an average density of 141.12 per square mile (54.49/km^{2}). The racial makeup of the township was 92.75% White, 0.79% African American, 0.17% Native American, 0.76% Asian, 0.17% Pacific Islander, 1.33% from other races, and 4.04% from two or more races. Hispanic or Latino people of any race were 2.68% of the population.

There were 1,653 households, out of which 24.10% had children under the age of 18 living with them, 56.99% were married couples living together, 5.14% had a female householder with no spouse present, and 35.15% were non-families. 27.00% of all households were made up of individuals, and 10.50% had someone living alone who was 65 years of age or older. The average household size was 2.19 and the average family size was 2.67.

The township's age distribution consisted of 18.7% under the age of 18, 7.9% from 18 to 24, 16.8% from 25 to 44, 35.1% from 45 to 64, and 21.5% who were 65 years of age or older. The median age was 50.3 years. For every 100 females, there were 116.6 males. For every 100 females age 18 and over, there were 116.1 males.

The median income for a household in the township was $56,677, and the median income for a family was $79,202. Males had a median income of $38,617 versus $27,185 for females. The per capita income for the township was $30,611. About 8.5% of families and 14.4% of the population were below the poverty line, including 23.4% of those under age 18 and 12.0% of those age 65 or over.

Historical population
Census	Pop.	Note	%±
2000	3,864		—
2010	3,820		−1.1%
2020	3,543		−7.3%
U.S. Decennial Census

== School districts ==
- East Dubuque Community Unit School District 119

== Political districts ==
- Illinois' 16th congressional district
- State House District 89
- State Senate District 45
