= Illinois Route 35 =

State highway in Jo Daviess County, Illinois, US

Illinois Route 35
- Great River Road
- IL 35 highlighted in red

Route information
- Maintained by IDOT
- Length: 2.42 mi (3.89 km)
- Existed: 1938–present

Major junctions
- South end: US 20 in East Dubuque
- North end: WIS 35 at the Wisconsin border near East Dubuque

Location
- Country: United States
- State: Illinois
- Counties: Jo Daviess

Highway system
- Illinois State Highway System; Interstate; US; State; Tollways; Scenic
← IL 34	→ US 36

Illinois Route 35 (IL 35) is a 2.42-mile-long (3.89 km) connector road between U.S. Route 20 (US 20) in East Dubuque and Highway 35 at the Wisconsin state line. It is currently the shortest state highway in Illinois, a stark contrast to the highway north of the state line, which is Wisconsin's longest highway.

== Route description ==
IL 35 begins at a four-way urban intersection in East Dubuque. US 20 passes overhead and connects to the intersection via an exit ramp. From here, IL 35 heads northeast out of East Dubuque on a curving route. Within East Dubuque, IL 35 is locally known as Wisconsin Avenue. Once it leaves East Dubuque, IL 35 becomes a primarily rural road, which it remains for the rest of its route. The highway passes County Route 5W shortly before becoming WIS 35 at the Wisconsin state line. IL 35 is an undivided two-lane road for its entire length.

== History ==
SBI Route 35 was originally a shorter road from Mound City to what is now U.S. Route 51. This road was 1-mile-long (1.6 km) (1.6 km) and served a federal cemetery. By 1934, Illinois Route 147 was extended all the way to US 51, replacing IL 35. By 1936, Illinois Route 37 entirely acquired IL 147 south of Marion. In 1938, the number was assigned to the modern-day routing, which had previously been IL 79.

From 1971 to 1982, U.S. Route 61 and U.S. Route 151 ran on Illinois 35 due to the Eagle Point Bridge closure upstream on the Mississippi River. This is the only time that U.S. 61 and U.S. 151 have had alignments in Illinois.

== Major intersections ==
The entire route is in Jo Daviess County.

Location	mi	km	Destinations	Notes
East Dubuque	0.00	0.00	US 20 west / Great River Road (National Route) north (Julien Dubuque Bridge) – Dubuque IA	Interchange; southern terminus; no exit to US 20 east
Dunleith Township	2.42	3.89	WIS 35 north / Great River Road north – LaCrosse	Continuation into Wisconsin
1.000 mi = 1.609 km; 1.000 km = 0.621 mi: Incomplete access
