= Lake Street (Chicago) =

Street in Chicago, Illinois, United States

- General Ulysses S. Grant Highway; 200 North (in the Loop)
- Lake Street at Cicero Avenue in Chicago; the Green Line elevated tracks run above Lake Street, October 2026
- Interactive map of Lake Street
- Part of: US 20
- Maintained by: IDOT and CDOT
- Length: 34.4 mi (55.4 km)
- West end: US 20 / Elgin Bypass at Villa Street in Elgin
- East end: Upper Stetson Avenue in Downtown Chicago

Lake Street is an east–west street in Chicago and part of its suburbs. A portion of Lake Street is designated as U.S. Route 20. Lake Street begins in downtown Chicago and travels west to the eastern terminus of the Elgin Bypass around suburban Elgin. The street travels west through the city and then begins to travel in a northwest fashion through several suburbs. The street is a distance of roughly 34.4 miles (55.4 km).

== Route description ==
Lake street begins at the end on the Elgin Bypass and intersection of Shales Pkwy and Bluff City Blvd. US 20 comes from the Elgin bypass onto Lake St. It then crosses the Canadian National Railway and has a traffic light with a suburban road. It then gradually climbs a hill and has another traffic light with car dealerships on the left side when facing east. It then passes by some residential areas and has an interchange with Illinois Route 59 (IL 59). After passing through more residential areas and some warehouses, it crosses under the Metra's Milwaukee District West Line (Canadian Pacific Railway) and meets the current western end of Illinois Route 390 (IL 390). After passing through more residential areas and shops, it enters Bloomingdale. Passing by shops ad gas stations, along with going through a forest, and passing by warehouses, it meets I-355.

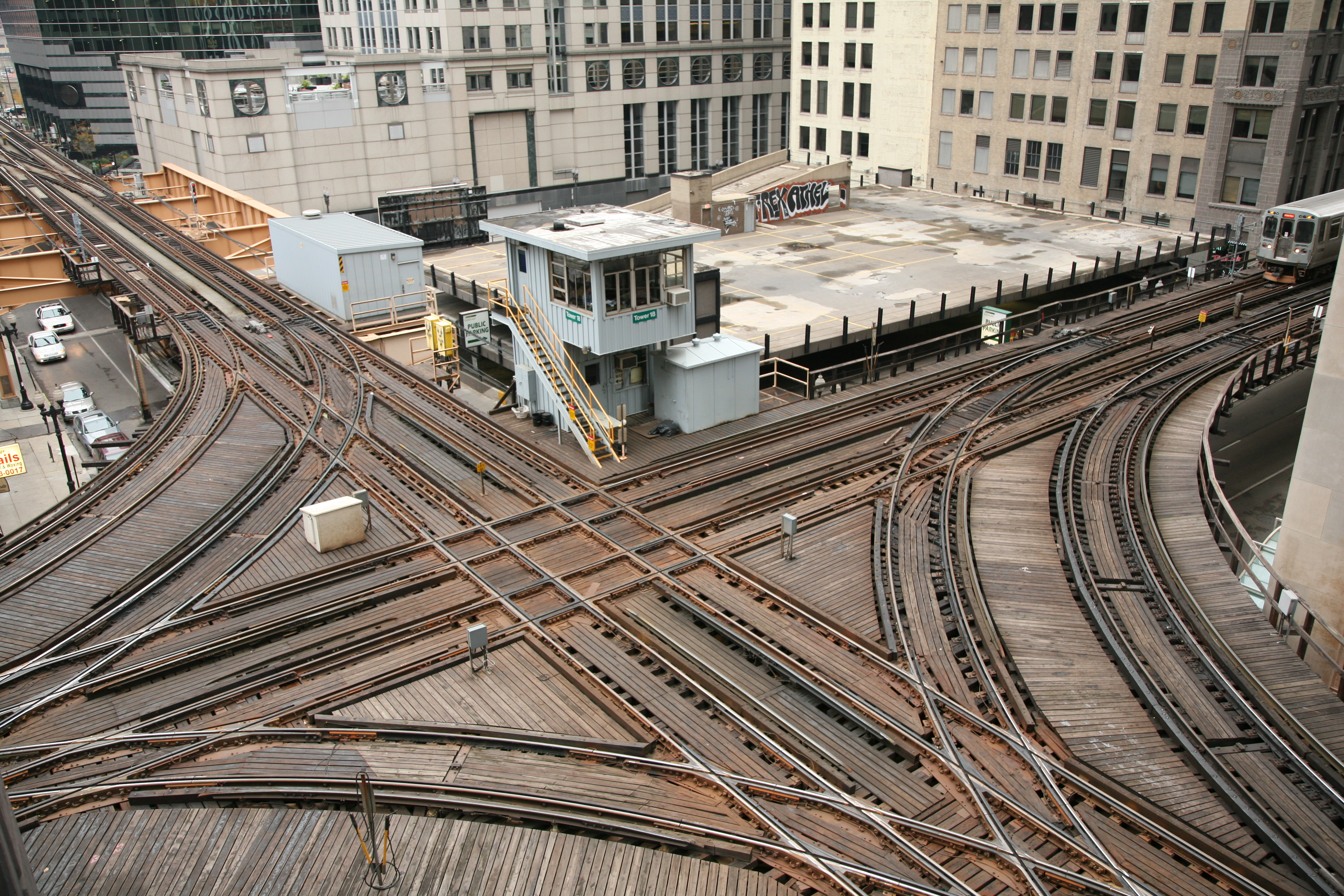
Chicago Transit Authority signal tower 18 guides elevated Chicago 'L' north and southbound Purple and Brown lines intersecting with east and westbound Pink and Green lines and the looping Orange line above the Wells and Lake street intersection in the loop.

Continuing east into Addison, Lake Street passes by shopping centers along with more residential areas while paralleling the Eisenhower Extension section of Interstate 290. The street then enters Elmhurst after crossing Salt Creek and Illinois Route 83 (IL 83). Since a portion of Lake Street in Elmhurst is reduced to a pair of discontinuous frontage roads along I-290, US 20 begins running concurrently with I-290 for 0.97 miles (1.56 km). Lake Street reappears at the interchange between I-290, Interstate 294 (I-294), and Illinois Route 64 (IL 64). After crossing the Union Pacific Railroad Milwaukee Subdivision, the street continues southeast through commercial and industrial areas in Northlake and Stone Park.

At Mannheim Road, US 20 turns south with U.S. Routes 12 and 45; the street continues east without carrying any route designation. The street then crosses the Indiana Harbor Belt Railroad and passes through a residential area in Melrose Park. It intersects with Illinois Route 171 (IL 171) in Maywood. After crossing the Des Plaines River and entering River Forest, Lake Street turns east and parallels another Union Pacific Railroad line, which hosts Metra's Union Pacific West Line. The street travels through Oak Park between the intersections with Illinois Route 43 (IL 43) and Austin Boulevard, beyond which the street enters the Austin neighborhood in Chicago.

In South Austin, Lake Street crosses under the parallel Union Pacific Railroad line along Pine Avenue. The street then briefly abuts the CTA Green Line, a Chicago "L" line, before the line runs directly above the street after Laramie Avenue; the line eventually curves south at Wabash Avenue. It passes through Garfield Park and continues east toward downtown Chicago. Along the way, it crosses a few freight railroad and "L" lines. It intersects major streets in Chicago and has a partial interchange with the Kennedy Expressway and Interstates 90 and 94. It then continues east and ends at Stetson Avenue.

== History ==
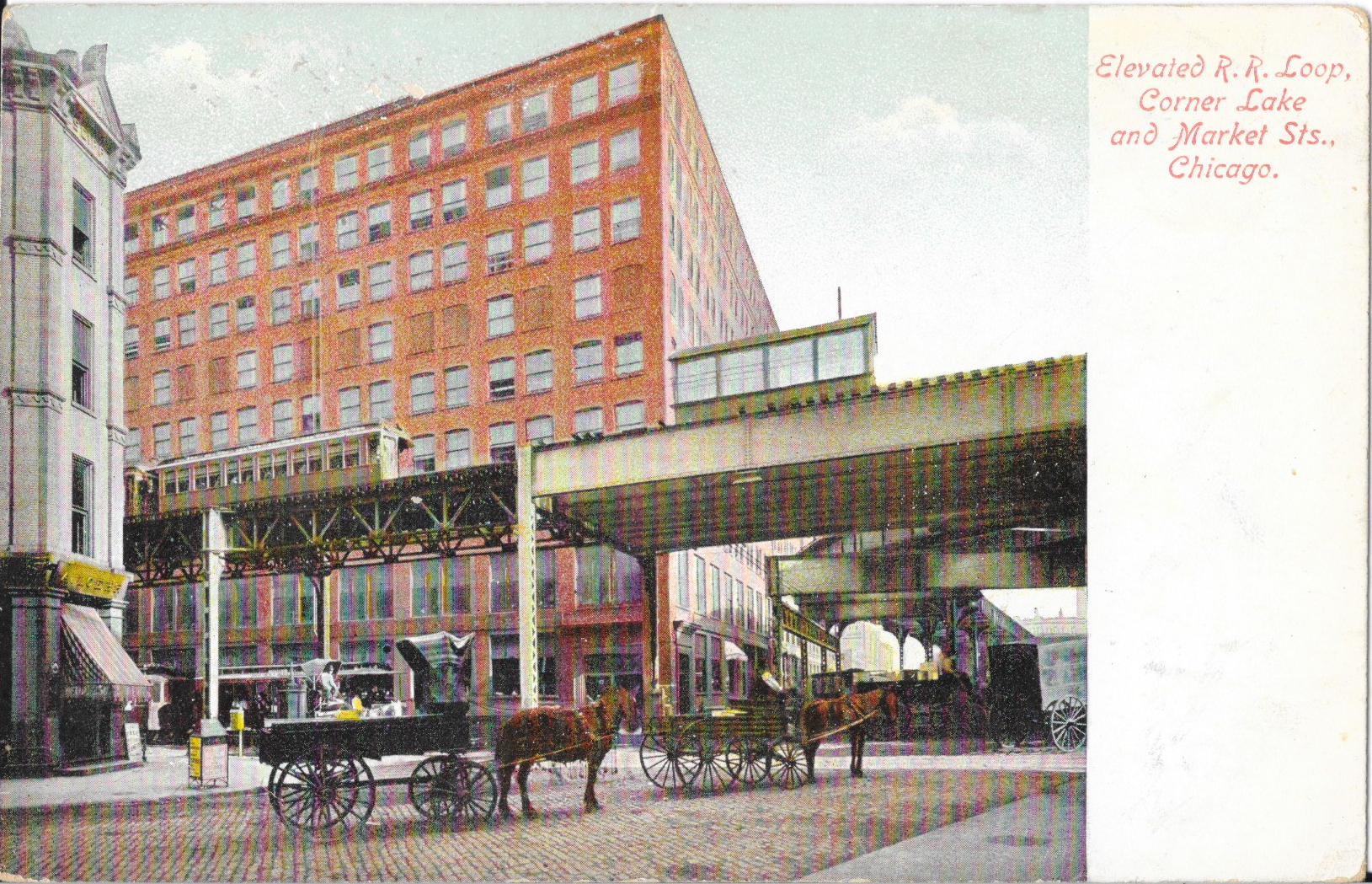
Lake and Market streets circa 1913

Most of Lake Street was once marked as US 20. In 1938, US 20 was moved onto Mannheim Road and La Grange Road; the remaining segment of Lake Street became City US 20. In 1960, it was renamed to Business US 20. In 1968, all designations were dropped from Lake Street east of Mannheim Road.

== Transportation ==
The Lake Street Elevated, a CTA Green Line branch, runs directly above its eponymous street between Laramie and Wabash avenues.

309 Lake Street is a Pace bus route that runs from Elmhurst station to Austin station. The route travels along its eponymous street southeast of Wolf Road.

Historically, the CTA's 16 Lake bus route ran from Austin Boulevard to downtown. The route, along with nine other routes, was discontinued in 1997 due to budget constraints.

== Major intersections ==
County	Location	mi	km	Destinations	Notes
Cook	Elgin	0.0	0.0	US 20 west (Elgin Bypass)	Western terminus
Cook	Elgin	0.0	0.0	Shales Parkway/Bluff City Boulevard	
Cook	Bartlett	1.8	2.9	IL 59 (Sutton Road)	Interchange
DuPage	Hanover Park	5.7	9.2	IL 390 Toll (Elgin-O'Hare Tollway)	Current western terminus of IL 390
DuPage	Hanover Park	6.0	9.7	CR 29 (Greenbook Boulevard)	
DuPage	Hanover Park	7.0	11.3	CR 23 (Gary Avenue)	
DuPage	Bloomingdale	9.3	15.0	CR 4 (Bloomingdale Road)	
DuPage	Bloomingdale	10.8	17.4	CR 24 (Medinah Road)	
DuPage	Addison	11.7	18.8	I-355 Toll (Veterans Memorial Tollway) to I-290 (Eisenhower Expressway)	Interchange
DuPage	Addison	11.9	19.2	IL 53 (Rohlwing Road)	
DuPage	Addison	14.4	23.2	CR 22 north (Addison Road)	
DuPage	Addison	15.0	24.1	CR 28 (Villa Avenue)	
DuPage	Elmhurst–Addison line	15.6	25.1	IL 83 (Kingery Highway) / CR 20 west (Grand Avenue) to I-290 (Eisenhower Expressway)	Interchange
DuPage	Elmhurst	17.0	27.4	US 20 east / I-290 (Eisenhower Expressway)	Interchange; eastern end of US 20 concurrency (western segment)
DuPage	Elmhurst	Gap in route			
DuPage	Elmhurst	18.9	30.4	I-290 (Eisenhower Expressway) / US 20 west	Eastbound US 20 (Lake Street) entrance only; western end of US 20 concurrency (eastern segment)
Cook	Northlake	19.0	30.6	I-294 Toll north (Tri-State Tollway)	Northbound I-294 entrance only
Cook	Stone Park	20.8	33.5	US 20 east / US 12 / US 45 (Mannheim Road)	Eastern end of US 20 concurrency
Cook	Maywood	23.4	37.7	IL 171 (1st Avenue)	
Cook	Oak Park–River Forest line	24.9	40.1	IL 43 (Harlem Avenue)	
Cook	Chicago	28.3	45.5	IL 50 (North Cicero Avenue)	
Cook	Chicago	33.3	53.6	I-90 / I-94 east (Kennedy Expressway)	Westbound I-90/I-94 exit; eastbound I-90/I-94 entrance
Cook	Chicago	34.4	55.4	North Upper Stetson Avenue	Eastern terminus
1.000 mi = 1.609 km; 1.000 km = 0.621 mi: Concurrency terminus; Electronic toll collection; Incomplete access
