= U.S. Route 20 in Illinois =

Section of U.S. Highway in Illinois, United States

U.S. Route 20
- Illinois Medal of Honor Highway; Ulysses S. Grant Memorial Highway
- US 20 highlighted in red

Route information
- Maintained by IDOT and CDOT
- Length: 233.93 mi (376.47 km)
- Existed: 1926–present

Major junctions
- West end: US 20 in East Dubuque
- I-39 / US 51 in Rockford; I-90 in Hampshire; IL 390 in Hanover Park; I-355 in Addison; I-290 / I-294 in Elmhurst; I-290 / IL 110 (CKC) in Westchester; I-55 in Hodgkins; I-294 in Bridgeview; I-94 in Chicago; I-90 / Chicago Skyway in Chicago
- East end: US 12 / US 20 / US 41 in Chicago

Location
- Country: United States
- State: Illinois
- Counties: Jo Daviess, Stephenson, Winnebago, Boone, McHenry, Kane, DuPage, Cook

Highway system
- United States Numbered Highway System; List; Special; Divided; Illinois State Highway System; Interstate; US; State; Tollways; Scenic
← IL 19	→ IL 21

U.S. Highway 20 (US 20) is the portion of an east–west United States Numbered Highway in the state of Illinois. After crossing the Mississippi River, US 20 enters the state in East Dubuque and runs in a generally east-southeast direction, exiting in the East Side neighborhood of Chicago. Since 2022, the highway has been officially named the Illinois Medal of Honor Highway, though it is also signed as the General Ulysses S. Grant Memorial Highway (often abbreviated as the Grant Memorial Highway).

As it travels through Illinois in the northern region of the state, US 20 passes through 23 state highways. Its routing joins three US highways (US 12, US 41, and US 45) and three interstate highways (I-39, I-290, and I-294). US 20 serves as a terminus point for both the shortest Illinois highway (Illinois 35) and the longest (Illinois 1).

Within Illinois, US 20 runs for a distance of 233.93 miles (376.47 km), its third-longest span east of the Mississippi River.

== Route description ==
As it travels through Illinois, US 20 varies widely in its configuration. Prior to entering the Chicago suburbs, the majority of the route is a two-lane surface road connecting small rural towns and multiple north–south state highways. In Freeport, the route expands to a controlled-access freeway bypass supplementing a business route. In Rockford, US 20 not only has a freeway bypass and a business route (the latter, expanding between four and six lanes), but the route plays a significant role in linking the city together with other locations in the region. US 20 is routed through Elgin with a four-lane bypass, connecting to several major roads.

After exiting Elgin as Lake Street, US 20 continues through the rest of the state as an arterial surface road with either four or six lanes.

=== Jo Daviess and Stephenson Counties ===
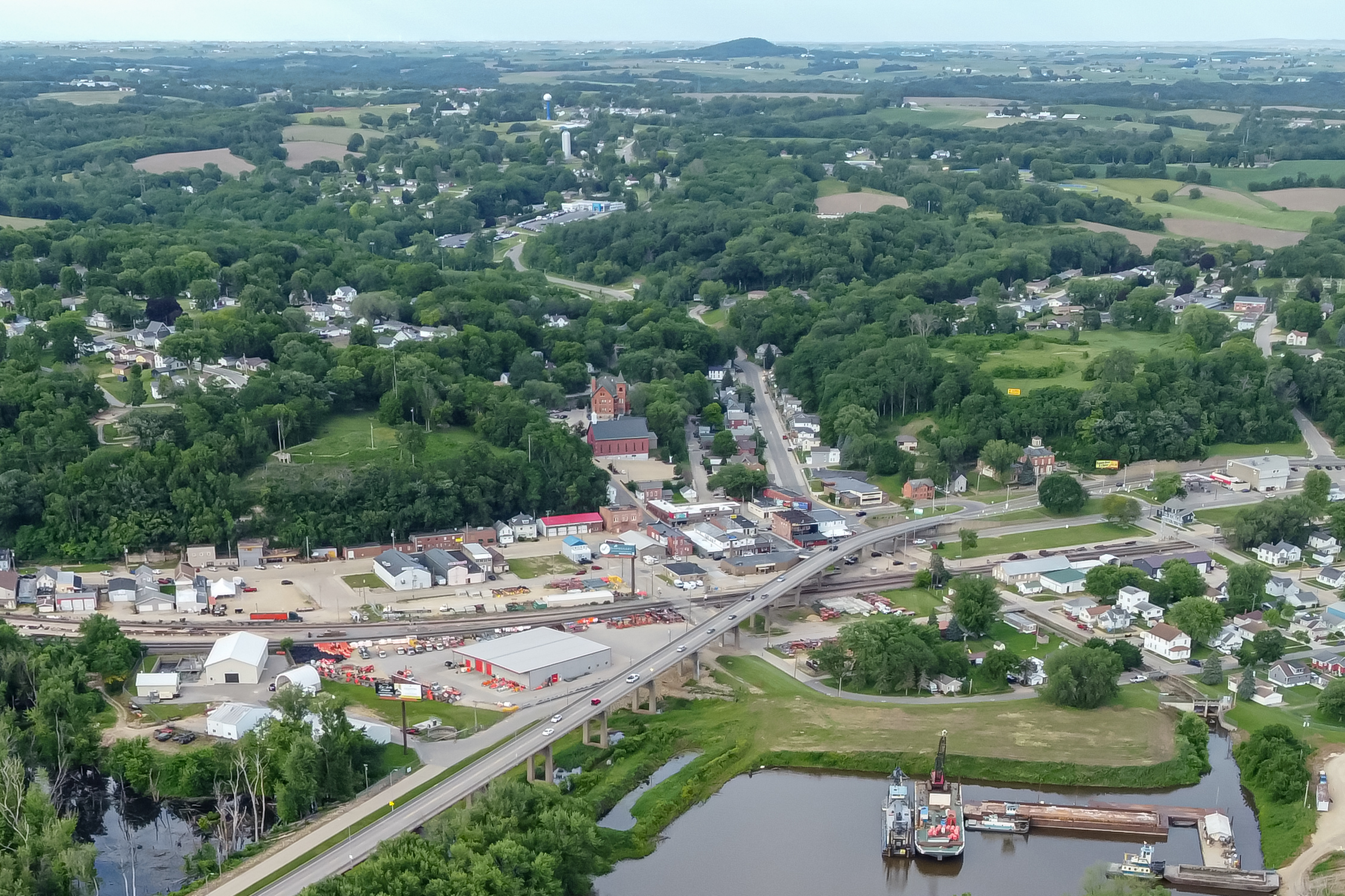
US 20 entering Illinois in East Dubuque after crossing the Mississippi River on the Julien Dubuque Bridge. The 2.4-mile length of Illinois 35 is in the background (from US 20 until it enters Wisconsin)

Crossing the Mississippi River on the Julien Dubuque Bridge, US 20 enters Jo Daviess County in East Dubuque, crossing Illinois 35 (the shortest state highway in Illinois) directly as it exits the bridge. Surrounded by tall hills to the north and the river to the south, the highway expands from two lanes to a four-lane divided highway. Upon exiting the city, it climbs uphill into the rugged country of the Driftless Area. Approximately 7 miles after exiting East Dubuque, Illinois 84 overlaps US 20 as the route turns southward towards Galena. Entering the city, the route (as Spring Street) steeply descends towards the Galena River; after crossing the river, the route (renamed as US 20 within Galena) climbs steeply upward, passing one block south of the Ulysses S. Grant Home. After exiting Galena, US 20 winds in a general southeast direction away from the Wisconsin border, passing through a mix of heavily wooded surroundings and rugged land with steep bluffs. After US 20 reaches its highest point in Illinois, the route ends its concurrency with Illinois 84 approximately 2 miles west of Elizabeth. While not specifically reserved for truck traffic, uphill portions of US 20 in Jo Daviess County are fitted with passing lanes (over a mile long), allowing for vehicles to pass each other safely without moving into oncoming traffic. US 20 exits the Driftless Area as it turns towards Stockton, turning directly eastward, where it carries Illinois 78 for slightly over a mile (before the latter moves northward).

Entering Stephenson County, US 20 moves into (relatively) smoother terrain, surrounded entirely by farmland. As it crosses Illinois 73, the route passes directly south of Lena; on its way to Freeport, the route loosely parallels Canadian National tracks (routing downtown Chicago to Iowa through Rockford). At a signal-controlled intersection outside of Freeport, US 20 splits into a business route entering the city as its primary east–west street (Galena Avenue) and a four-lane controlled-access freeway, bypassing Freeport to the north and to the east. Along with crossing the Pecatonica River, both routings connect Freeport with Illinois 26 and Illinois 75. After exiting the city, the business route rejoins US 20, reconfigured as a four-lane divided highway. Again surrounded completely by farmland, the highway passes between Ridott and German Valley before exiting the county.

=== Winnebago and Boone Counties ===
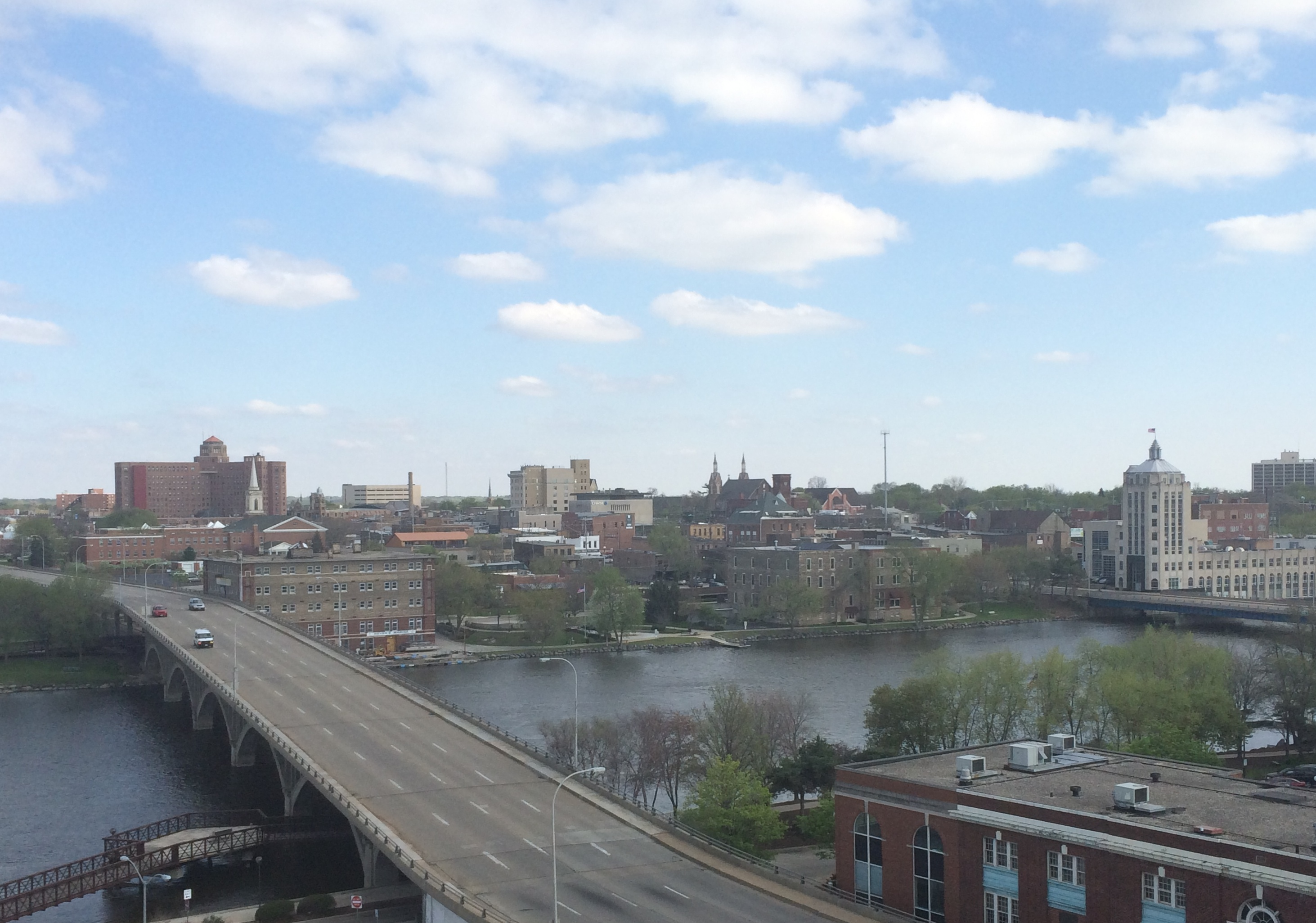
Jefferson Street Bridge, the one-way four-lane bridge carrying westbound Business US 20 traffic across the Rock River. (East side of Rockford in background)

US 20 enters Winnebago County 10 miles westward of Rockford (the largest city in Illinois outside of Chicago and its suburbs). Before entering the city, the route passes through signal-controlled intersections: Pecatonica Road (south of Pecatonica) and at Winnebago Road/Elida Street in Winnebago. Two miles east of the latter intersection, US 20 enters Rockford, splitting into a four-lane controlled-access freeway bypass and a four-lane surface street (State Street; US 20 Business); the latter serves both Rockford and Belvidere.

Between Rockford and Cherry Valley, US 20 splits from I-39/US 51 before the two interstates link together. This is the point where US 20 and I-90 begin to parallel each other, doing so until their eastern terminus in Massachusetts.

==== Rockford ====
On the US 20 bypass, the four-lane freeway turns southeast of Rockford approximately 2 miles east of Winnebago; it has 6 interchanges with major city streets. Before its interchange with Illinois 2 (Main Street), the bypass turns directly east, subsequently passing Illinois 251, before taking on I-39/US 51. After passing South Alpine Road, US 20 passes an interchange with Interstate 39, with the eastern portion of the US 20 bypass also concurrent with US 51. US 20 exits the bypass between Rockford and Cherry Valley in its interchange with Harrison Avenue (I-39 exit 122); less than a mile northward, the bypass has its northern terminus, as I-39/US 51 merge with I-90 (I-90 Exit 17).

The US 20 business route enters Rockford at its western edge as West State Street, traveling towards the downtown region of the city through mixed residential and commercial developments. After crossing the southern terminus of Illinois 70 (Kilburn Avenue), the business route designation is moved from State Street (which narrows to two lanes) to two separate three-lane roads: Jefferson Street (westbound traffic) and Chestnut/Walnut Street and 1st Avenue (eastbound traffic). After crossing the Rock River, the business route returns to East State Street a block east of Charles Street, shortly after it exits downtown and returns to four-lane traffic. Initially surrounded by residential neighborhoods, the route shifts towards entirely towards commercial developments, widening to six lanes. After passing under I-39/90, it narrows from six lanes to four and exits the city.

==== Belvidere ====
US 20 continues towards Belvidere in a right turn from the Rockford bypass (taking over for Harrison Avenue). Bordering to the north of Cherry Valley, US 20 passes over the Kishwaukee River before passing underneath I-90 as it heads directly east, paralleling I-90 through Belvidere (forming much of its southern border). The majority of the route is a four-lane divided highway, with US 20 having an interchange with Appleton Road (accessing the Belvidere Assembly Plant). At its intersection with Belvidere Road/Genoa Road, US 20 is the eastern terminus of the Rockford/Belvidere US 20 business route, which is ½-mile north of an I-90 interchange.

After exiting Rockford, the US 20 business route continues as East State Street until the Boone county line, where it becomes signed as "US 20 Business"; in addition to farmland, the route is surrounded by forest preserves and rural subdivisions. Following a signaled intersection, the route narrows down to two lanes. After entering Belvidere, the business route (renamed as North State Street) turns southeast. Within the Belvidere city limits, the route turns southeast and is renamed North State Street. At its intersection with Appleton Road, the business route splits from State Street to form a bypass around Belvidere. Along with forming the southern terminus of Illinois 76, the bypass forms much of the northern and eastern borders of the city; after crossing the Kishwaukee River, it becomes a city street (Belvidere Road), before ending the Rockford/Belvidere business route at its intersection with its US 20 intersection, turning into Genoa Road, which accesses I-90.

Less than one mile from its intersection, US 20 narrows to a two-lane road, crossing its last signaled intersection in the Rockford area a mile later. After passing through the Rockford and Belvidere region, US 20 becomes nearly flat, again surrounded by farmland. Near the county border, the route passes through unincorporated Garden Prairie, inaccessible by I-90.

=== McHenry and Kane Counties ===
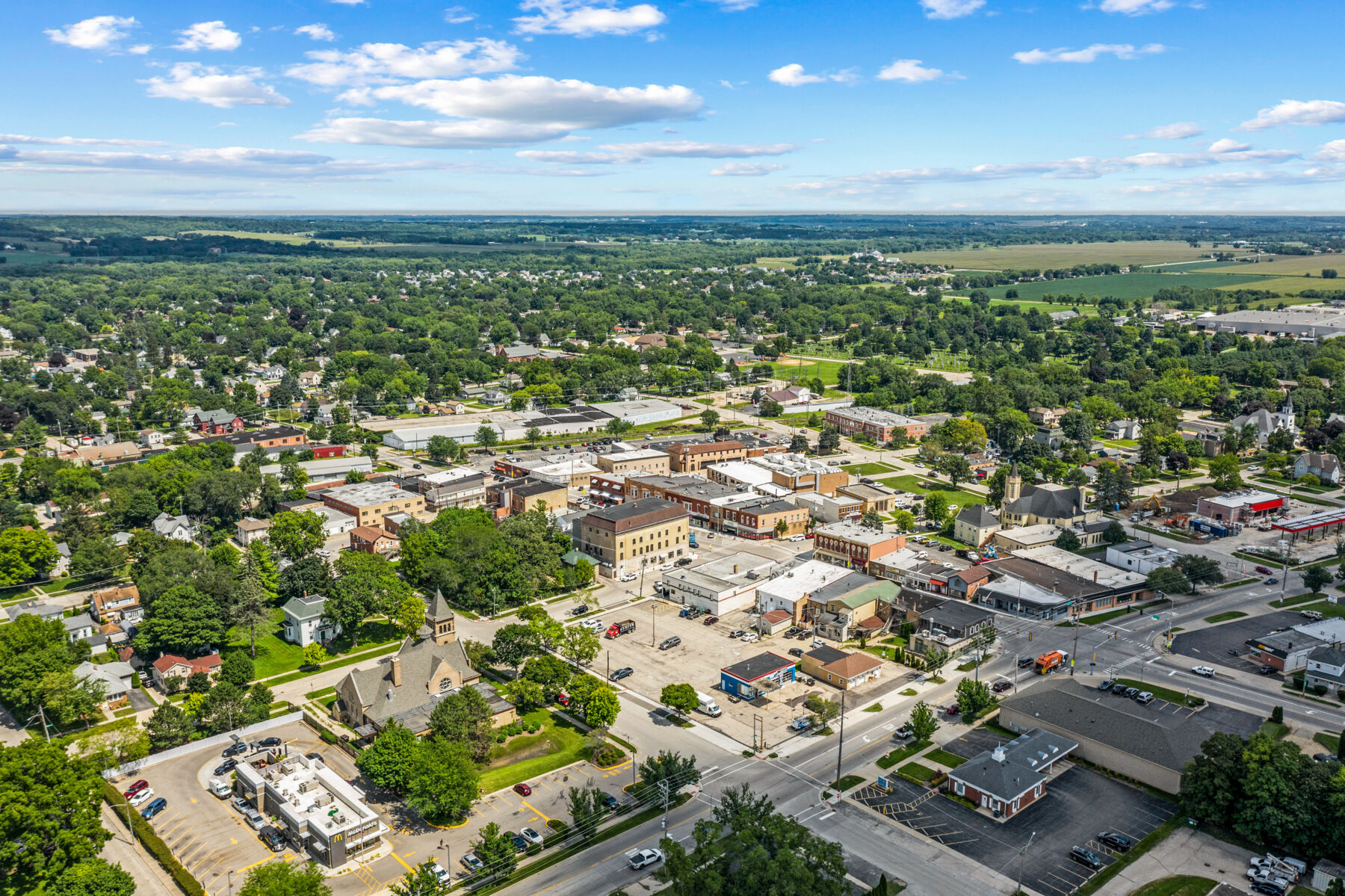
Aerial view of intersection of US 20 and Illinois 23 in Marengo (Illinois 176 is at the top of the picture).

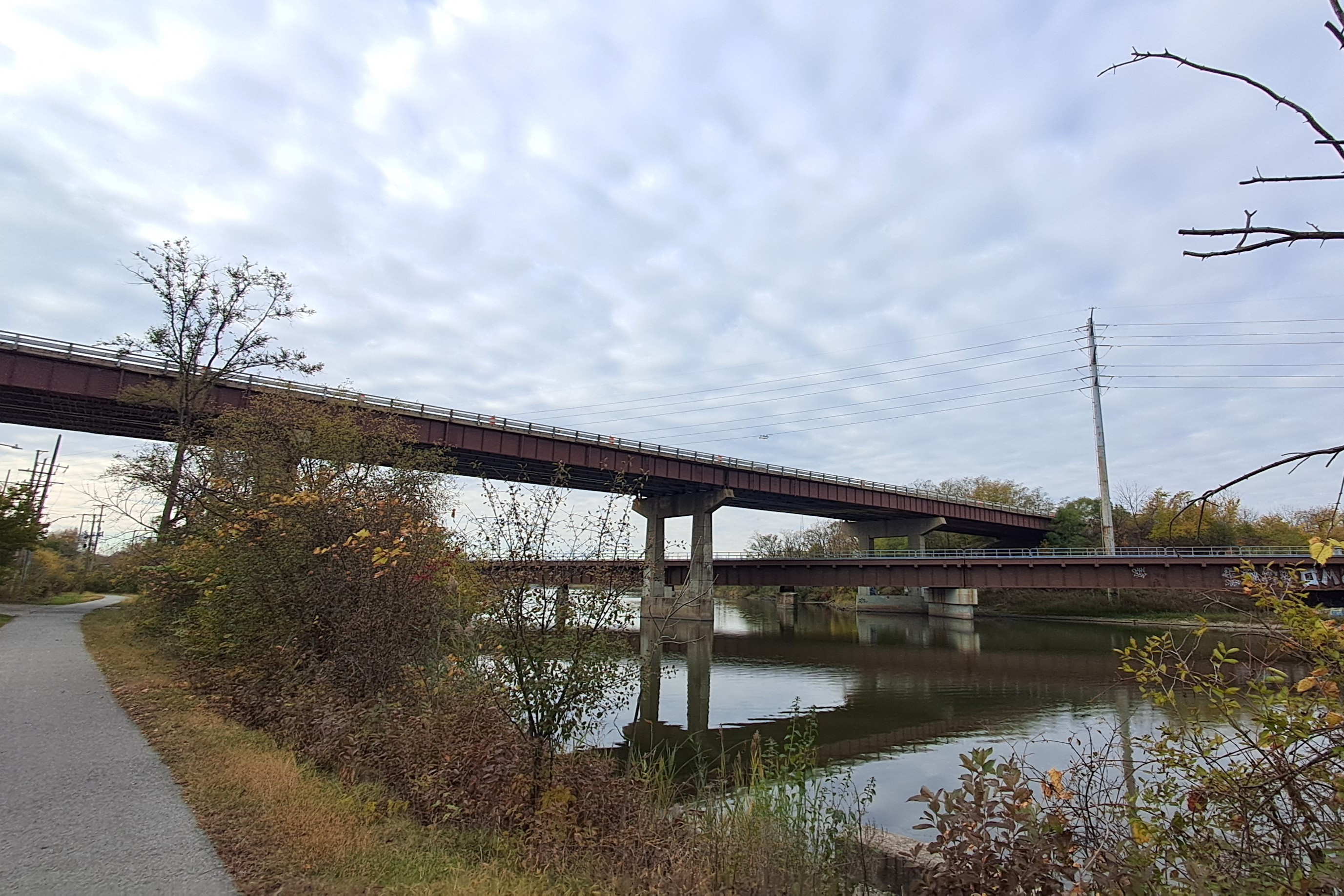
US 20 Elgin Bypass crossing over the Fox River in Elgin.

As it enters McHenry County, US 20 heads straight east as I-90 continues to move southeast. As it enters Marengo, the route retains US 20/Grant Highway as a street name (though serving as its primary east–west road). Near the center of the city, US 20 crosses Illinois 23, linking the route to I-90 (approximately 5 miles south) and the Illinois 176 (its western terminus, ½ mile north); after Illinois 23, the route begins to turn southeast. After passing through unincorporated Coral, US 20 has two large roundabout intersections as it travels towards I-90: south of Union (accessing Marengo, Union, and Huntley) and the center of unincorporated Harmony (accessing IL 23, I-90, and Huntley). Less than a half-mile south of Harmony, US 20 exits the county.

Less than a half-mile south of its roundabout in Harmony, US 20 enters Kane County north of Hampshire. Shortly before crossing I-90 (for a second time), it has a trumpet interchange with the interstate, surrounded by multiple travel centers. After traveling alongside the eastern border of Hampshire, the route turns towards Illinois 47 in Pingree Grove, where US 20 changes routing with Illinois 72 (Higgins Road). As Canadian Pacific rail tracks preclude US 20 forming an intersection with IL 72, Illinois 47 carries the two east–west routes under a railroad viaduct (forming a wrong-way concurrency) for slightly under ½ mile before separating.

==== Elgin ====
East of Illinois 47, US 20 maintains its southeastern alignment as it travels around Pingree Grove, surrounded by a mix of farmland, residential, and industrial developments. Continuing as a two-lane rural roadway, the route enters the Elgin region as it passes by several residential subdivisions. After crossing Longcommon Parkway, US 20 is expanded to a limited-access freeway (returning to four lanes for the first time since Belvidere), though passing through multiple residential areas on both sides, it largely passes between Elgin and its South Elgin suburb. Along with its first interchange with Randall Road (the historical western border of the Chicago suburbs), the Elgin Bypass accesses Illinois 31 (State Street) and Illinois 25 (Liberty Street, northward; St. Charles Street, southward) as it crosses the Fox River. As the westbound traffic passes over it, the east end of the bypass has an eastern entrance for Villa Street (the original routing of US 20 in the city east of the Fox River).

After its interchange with Villa Street, the freeway reverts to a four-lane surface street, maintaining at least that width for the rest of its routing in Illinois.

=== Chicago suburbs ===
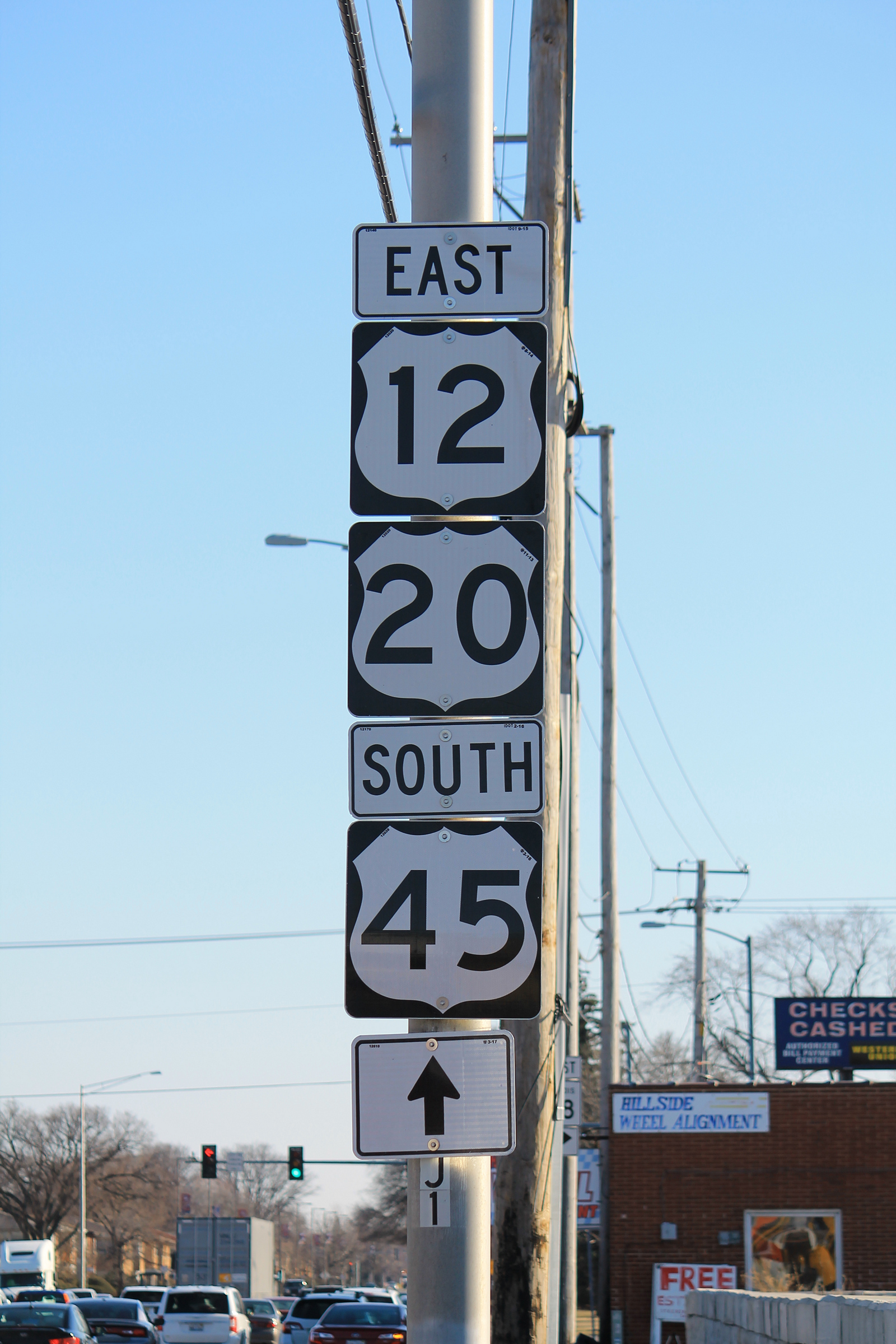
Signage of US 20 on Mannheim Road, just north of the eastern terminus of Illinois 38 (Roosevelt Road) in Westchester.

As Elgin enters Cook County, US 20 becomes Lake Street, serving as a major east–west arterial surface link from the western suburbs to Chicago. After exiting Elgin, Lake Street travels through Streamwood and Bartlett, where it has an overpass interchange with Illinois 59 (Sutton Road).

In Hanover Park, the route enters DuPage County as it continues to parallel the routing of I-90 (along with Illinois 72 and Illinois 19); it widens for to six lanes (for the first time since Rockford). Between Hanover Park and Roselle, Lake Street forms an interchange with Illinois 390 (marking the terminus of the Elgin–O'Hare Tollway). After briefly narrowing in Roselle, Lake Street reverts to six lanes (with a wide median) in Bloomingdale, where it passes between Addison and Itasca before it has an interchange with Interstate 355 (I-355) and crosses Illinois 53 (Rohlwing Road). After passing Illinois 53, Lake Street is less than a mile south of the interchange where I-355 joins the Eisenhower Expressway (I-290); narrowing to four lanes, it begins to directly parallel the latter. In an overpass with the Kingery Highway (Illinois 83), Lake Street forms a double interchange entering into I-290. Crossing into Elmhurst, US 20 is routed onto I-290 at York Street (to accommodate a gap created by major reconstruction), where it transfers onto I-294, where it exits back onto Lake Street.

After US 20 exits I-294 onto Lake Street, the route enters Cook County (for a second time), passing between Northlake and Melrose Park. Slightly less than 2 miles east of I-294, US 20 ends its routing with Lake Street, moving onto Mannheim Road (forming a three-way concurrency alongside US 45 and US 12); the route continues its parallel orientation with I-290 until the latter turns eastward towards downtown Chicago (leading to a Mannheim Road interchange with I-290). After passing Illinois 38 (Roosevelt Road) and US 34 (Ogden Avenue), Mannheim Road is renamed La Grange Road as it enters La Grange. After entering Hodgkins, the route crosses the Stevenson Expressway (I-55), the Tri-State Tollway (I-294), and Illinois 171 as it crosses the Des Plaines River.

Routed into multiple forest preserves, La Grange Road continues as a four-lane surface road into Hickory Hills until its intersection with 95th Street. While US 45 continues south, US 20 moves onto four-lane 95th Street (taking US 12 with it). After exiting the city, 95th Street passes by I-294 and Illinois 43 (Harlem Avenue). After entering Oak Lawn, 95th Street passes Illinois 50 (Cicero Avenue). Before entering Chicago, 95th Street passes through Evergreen Park.

=== Chicago ===
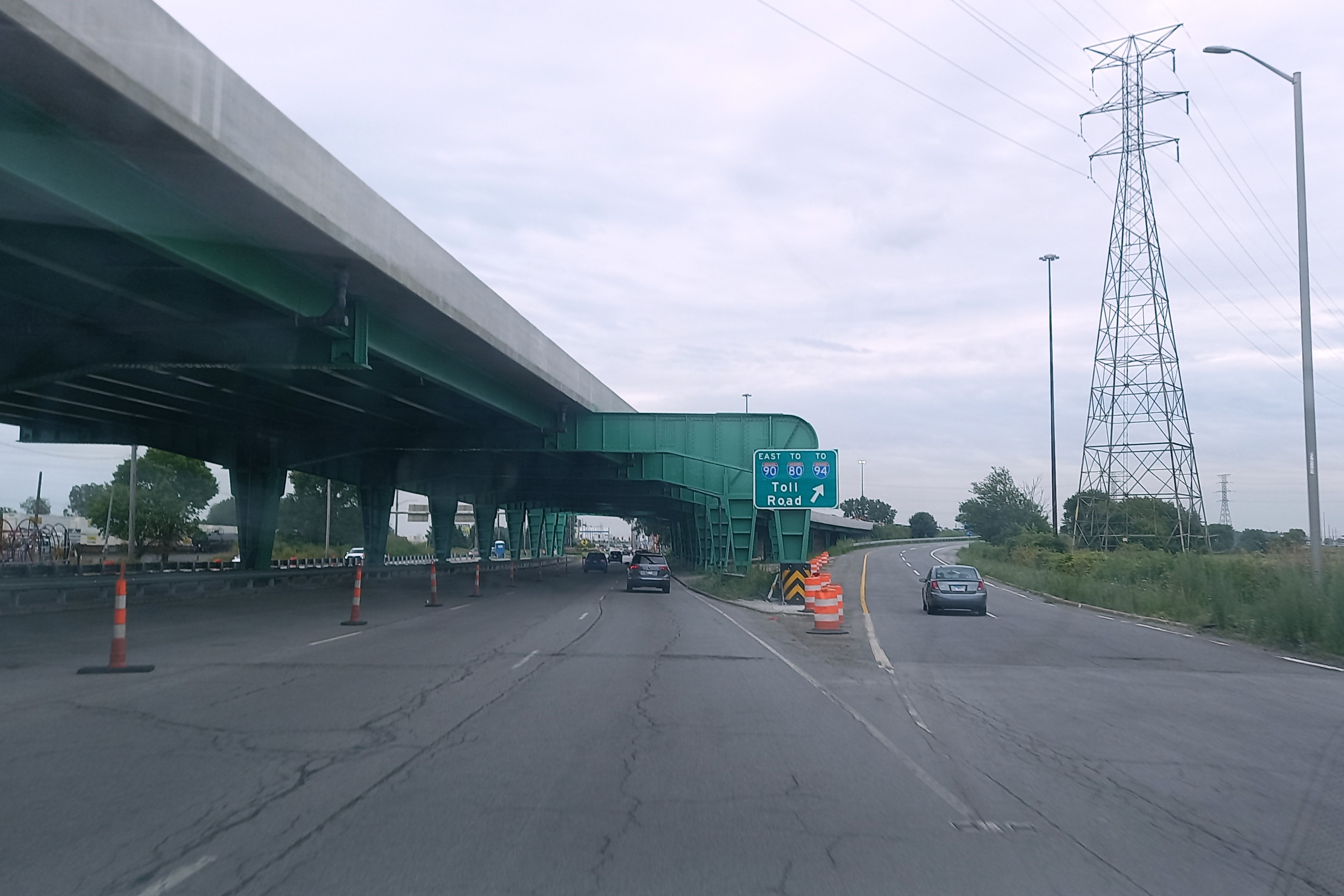
US 20 (Indianapolis Avenue) at the Illinois-Indiana border. Indianapolis Avenue crosses underneath I-90 (becoming Indianapolis Boulevard), with the onramp routing traffic onto the Indiana Toll Road.

For its last 9 miles in Illinois, US 20 travels through the city of Chicago. Continuing to carry both US 12 and US 20, 95th Street enters the city in the southwestern Beverly neighborhood (the highest land region of the city). In the Roseland neighborhood, the route passes north of the split of I-57 from the Dan Ryan Expressway. Between the Pullman and South Deering neighborhoods, the route passes Stony Island Avenue (marking its transition from a freeway to a surface street). Shortly before its eastern terminus in the East Side neighborhood, 95th Street crosses the Calumet River with a double bascule bridge. Subsequently, US 12/20 joins US 41 (Ewing Avenue) as it moves southward to Indianapolis Avenue, which carries the route next to (and underneath) the Chicago Skyway for its final mile in Illinois.

As it exits Chicago into Hammond, Indiana, US 20 (with US 12 and US 41) crosses underneath the Chicago Skyway as I-90 turns southward and lowers back to ground level, with an onramp to the Indiana Toll Road beginning at the state line. After carrying Indianapolis Boulevard through Hammond and Whiting (with US 41 splitting from it), US 20 turns eastward to directly parallel I-90, where it forms the northern terminus of I-65 in Gary.

== History ==
Outside of Chicago, the primary routing of US 20 has not changed since 1926. In 1938, the highway adopted its current routing, adopting its concurrency with US 12 and US 45 on Mannheim Road.

In 1955, the Illinois General Assembly designated the entire length of US 20 in Illinois the "U.S. Grant Memorial Highway"; new signs were produced in late 2007 to reflect this designation along its entire length. In March 2022, the official name of US 20 changed again, with the Illinois Senate renaming it as the Illinois Medal of Honor Highway for its entire length in Illinois.

=== City US 20 (1938-1960) ===
Prior to 1938, US 20 continued east on Lake Street east of Mannheim Road (the current US 12/US 45). The highway continued through downtown Chicago, moving to Washington Boulevard until its intersection with US 12/US 41.

After 1938, US 20 adopted its current routing to bypass the city limits of Chicago (of the time) and move eastward on 95th Street. The portion of US 20 that previously entered the city of Chicago was redesignated "City US 20". South of US 66, City US 20 shared concurrency with the southern portion of City US 12 and US 330 (today, Stony Island Avenue). At 95th Street, the City portion of the route ended, with the highway moving into Indiana.

In 1960, City US 20 was redesignated Business US 20; in 1968, that routing designation was dropped.

=== Elgin Bypass (1962-present) ===
Construction of the Golf Road (IL 58) extension to Summit Street in Elgin was completed in 1932. In 1958, I-90 was built through the north side of Elgin extending east to Devon Avenue and on to Chicago by 1960. In 1935, concerned about increasing numbers of traffic, residents of Elgin laid plans to build a bypass. US 20 had been routed down Villa Street, Highland Avenue, and Larkin Avenue through downtown Elgin. A section of freeway opened south of Elgin as the Elgin Bypass 27 years later.

The segment of the Elgin Bypass between McLean Boulevard and Grace Street (IL 25), including the Fox River bridge, was opened first. Later, the outer segments of the bypass—to Randall Road on the west and Bluff City Boulevard on the east—were opened. On November 30, 1962, Governor Otto Kerner Jr. dedicated the Elgin Bypass.

From 1962 until 1984, the old route was designated as US 20 Business (US 20 Bus.).

In 2012–2016, the interchange between the Elgin Bypass and McLean Boulevard was upgraded to a single-point urban interchange, the bridge was widened and replaced, and portions of the bypass were repaved at a cost of $44.4 million (equivalent to $56.7 million in 2024).

In 2019, the interchange between the Elgin Bypass and Randall Road received a $9-million (equivalent to $10.9 million in 2024) upgrade so that northbound Randall Road traffic can enter the eastbound Elgin Bypass without making a left turn at a traffic light.

Starting in 2014, a comprehensive study of the Elgin Bypass corridor resulted in a number of recommendations including a wider bridge across the Fox River, a replacement bridge for IL 31 crossing the bypass, and replacement of other bridges. The 2019 estimates of the recommended improvements total $84 million (equivalent to $101 million in 2024), with $10.6 million (equivalent to $12.8 million in 2024) designated for the IL 31 bridge.

=== Rockford Bypass (1965-present) ===
In 1965, a US 20 bypass was completed around the southern portion of Rockford; a four lane limited-access freeway starting approximately 2 miles east of Winnebago, the bypass formed the southern border of the city, turning northeast between Rockford and Cherry Valley, joining I-90 as it turned northward towards Wisconsin. The previous routing of US 20 through the city (West/East State Street) was redesignated as Business US 20 (later including the portion of US 20 extending to Belvidere). In 1967, the routing of US 20 was revised, as it replaced a segment of Illinois 5 extending through Belvidere north of I-90 upgraded to a four-lane divided highway.

In 1975, Business US 20 was revised to its current routing. In place of crossing the Rock River on State Street (a two-lane road), traffic was routed onto two different three-lane roads between Charles Street and Avon Street: Jefferson Street (westbound traffic) and Chestnut Street/Walnut Street/First Avenue (eastbound traffic).

The early 1980s construction of Interstate 39 (as a successor to US 51) affected the Rockford bypass in multiple ways. The first portion of the route constructed, a large trumpet interchange one mile east of South Alpine Road formed the northern terminus of I-39. The addition came with several routing changes, as US 51 was shifted from its surface-level routing within Rockford to the eastern third of the US 20 bypass (its former routing redesignated as Illinois 251); the concurrency provided US 51 a direct connection with I-90 (previously, it only connected through its concurrency with Illinois 75 in South Beloit). As I-39 was extended into Wisconsin in the 1990s, the eastern portion of the bypass was resigned as I-39/US 20/US 51.

Since 2023, the I-39 portion of the US 20 bypass has undergone a $300 million reconstruction project, including a redesign of the two interchanges shared by I-39 and US 20, multiple bridge replacements, and widening both the highway and its overpassed roads from four lanes to six.

== Future ==
Long range plans call for US 20 to be upgraded to a four-lane highway from Rockford to East Dubuque. The project dates back to the 1970s, when a major supplemental freeway system was proposed in Illinois. US 20 has been completed as a four-lane freeway/expressway combination between Rockford and Freeport as well as Galena and East Dubuque. The remaining gap between Freeport and Galena is planned to be filled, but efforts have stalled in recent years, mainly due to funding issues.

== Major intersections ==
All exits are unnumbered.

County	Location	mi	km	Destinations	Notes
Mississippi River		0.0	0.0	US 20 west / Great River Road (National Route) north – Dubuque	Continuation into Iowa
Mississippi River		0.0	0.0	Iowa–Illinois state line (Julien Dubuque Bridge)	
Jo Daviess	East Dubuque	0.7	1.1	IL 35 north – Wisconsin	Interchange; southern terminus of IL 35; no eastbound entrance
Jo Daviess	Rawlins Township	11.2	18.0	IL 84 north – Hazel Green	Western end of IL 84 overlap
Jo Daviess	Elizabeth Township	26.4	42.5	IL 84 south / Great River Road (National Route) south (Washington Street) – Hanover, Savanna	Eastern end of IL 84/Great River Road overlap
Jo Daviess	Stockton	41.7	67.1	IL 78 south (Main Street) – Mount Carroll	Western end of IL 78 overlap
Jo Daviess	Stockton–Wards Grove township line	42.9	69.0	IL 78 north – Warren	Eastern end of IL 78 overlap
Stephenson	Lena	50.8	81.8	IL 73 – Lena, Pearl City	
Stephenson	Freeport	57.4	92.4	US 20 Bus. east – Freeport	Western terminus of US 20 Bus.; western end of freeway
Stephenson	Freeport	61.8	99.5	IL 26 – Freeport, Monroe	
Stephenson	Freeport	65.0	104.6	IL 75 – Freeport, Rockton	
Stephenson	Freeport	68.8	110.7	Springfield Road – Freeport	Eastbound exit and westbound entrance
Stephenson	Freeport	68.8	110.7	US 20 Bus. west – Freeport	Westbound exit and eastbound entrance; eastern terminus of US 20 Bus.; eastern end of freeway; western end of divided highway
Winnebago	Rockford	85.9	138.2	US 20 Bus. east (State Street)	Eastbound exit and westbound entrance; western terminus of US 20 Bus.; eastern end of divided highway; western end of freeway section
Winnebago	Rockford	87.7	141.1	CR 24 (Meridian Road)	
Winnebago	Rockford	90.1	145.0	CR 27 (Montague Road)	
Winnebago	Rockford	92.7	149.2	IL 2 (Main Street) – Dixon	
Winnebago	Rockford	94.6	152.2	IL 251 (11th Street) – Rochelle	
Winnebago	Rockford	96.8	155.8	Alpine Road	
Winnebago	Rockford	97.3	156.6	I-39 south / US 51 south – Bloomington, Normal	Western end of I-39/US 51 overlap
Winnebago	Rockford	100.4	161.6	I-39 Toll north / US 51 north to I-90 Toll (Jane Addams Memorial Tollway) / Harrison Avenue – Chicago, Wisconsin, Rockford	Diverging diamond interchange; eastern end of freeway section; eastern end of I-39/US 51 overlap; I-39 exit 121
Boone	Belvidere	106.1	170.8	Appleton Road	Interchange
Boone	Belvidere	108.0	173.8	US 20 Bus. west (Belvidere Road) to I-90 Toll (Genoa Road)	Eastern terminus of US 20 Bus.
McHenry	Marengo	119.2	191.8	IL 23 (State Street) to IL 176 (Telegraph Street)	
Kane	Hampshire	128.0	206.0	I-90 Toll (Jane Addams Memorial Tollway) – Chicago, Rockford	I-90 exit 42
Kane	Pingree Grove	133.6	215.0	IL 47 north / IL 72 east (Higgins Road) – Huntley, West Dundee	Western end of IL 47/IL 72 overlap
Kane	Pingree Grove	134.0	215.7	IL 47 south / IL 72 west – Elburn, Hampshire	Eastern end of IL 47/IL 72 overlap
Kane	Elgin	141.5	227.7	CR 34 (Randall Road)	Western end of Elgin Bypass freeway
Kane	Elgin	141.6	227.9	Larkin Avenue	Eastbound exit and westbound entrance
Kane	Elgin	143.0	230.1	McLean Boulevard	
Kane	Elgin	144.4	232.4	IL 31 (State Street)	
Kane	Elgin	145.1	233.5	IL 25	Split into separate north and south exits westbound
Cook	Elgin	146.4	235.6	Villa Street	Westbound exit and eastbound entrance; eastern end of Elgin Bypass
Cook	Bartlett	148.6	239.1	IL 59 (Sutton Road) – Barrington, West Chicago	Interchange
DuPage–Cook county line	Hanover Park	151.9	244.5	CR 43 south (County Farm Road), Barrington Road	Northern terminus of CR 43; County Farm Road continues north as Barrington Road
DuPage	Hanover Park	152.6	245.6	IL 390 Toll east (Elgin–O'Hare Tollway)	I-Pass only; interchange; western terminus of IL 390
DuPage	Hanover Park	152.9	246.1	CR 29 west (Greenbrook Boulevard)	Eastern terminus of CR 29
DuPage	Roselle	153.9	247.7	CR 23 (Gary Avenue)	
DuPage	Bloomingdale	156.2	251.4	CR 4 (Bloomingdale Road)	
DuPage	Addison	157.8	254.0	CR 24 (Medinah Road)	
DuPage	Addison	158.6	255.2	I-355 to I-290 – Joliet, Chicago, Rockford	I-355 exit 31
DuPage	Addison	158.8	255.6	IL 53 (Rohlwing Road)	
DuPage	Addison	161.4	259.7	CR 22 north (Addison Road)	Southern terminus of CR 22
DuPage	Addison	162.0	260.7	CR 28 (Villa Avenue, Wood Dale Road)	
DuPage	Addison–Elmhurst line	162.6	261.7	IL 64 Truck west / IL 83 (Kingery Highway) to I-290 CR 20 east (Grand Avenue)	Interchange; western end of IL 64 Truck overlap
DuPage	Elmhurst	163.8	263.6	York Road, North York Street	Interchange
DuPage	Elmhurst	163.8	263.6	I-290 west – Rockford	Western end of I-290 overlap; I-290 exit 12
DuPage	Elmhurst	164.8	265.2	I-290 east to I-294 Toll south (Tri-State Tollway) – Chicago, Indiana	Eastern end of I-290 overlap; I-290 exit 13A; I-294 north exit 31
DuPage	Elmhurst	165.2	265.9	IL 64 east (North Avenue) / IL 64 Truck end	Interchange; eastern end of IL 64 Truck overlap; eastbound left exit and westbound left entrance
Cook	Northlake	165.4	266.2	I-294 Toll north (Tri-State Tollway) – Milwaukee, O'Hare	I-294 exits 33 & 34
Cook	Berkeley	167.3	269.2	US 12 west / US 45 north (Mannheim Road north)	Western end of US 12/US 45 overlap
Cook	Bellwood–Hillside line	168.4	271.0	IL 56 west (Washington Boulevard)	Eastern terminus of IL 56
Cook	Hillside–Westchester line	169.2	272.3	I-290 / IL 110 (CKC) (Eisenhower Expressway)	I-290 exit 17
Cook	Hillside–Westchester line	169.7	273.1	IL 38 west (Roosevelt Road)	Eastern terminus of IL 38
Cook	La Grange	172.9	278.3	US 34 (Ogden Avenue)	
Cook	Countryside–Hodgkins line	174.1	280.2	Historic US 66 (Joliet Road)	
Cook	Countryside–Hodgkins line	176.8	284.5	I-55 (Stevenson Expressway) to I-294 Toll north – Chicago, St. Louis	I-55 exit 279
Cook	Willow Springs	178.1	286.6	IL 171 (Archer Avenue) to 79th Street / I-294 Toll south (Tri-State Tollway) – Indiana	Cloverleaf interchange; left exit eastbound
Cook	Hickory Hills	180.2	290.0	US 45 south (La Grange Road south)	Eastern end of US 45 overlap
Cook	Bridgeview	182.5	293.7	I-294 Toll (Tri-State Tollway) – Wisconsin, Indiana	Tolled; I-294 exit 17
Cook	Bridgeview	182.9	294.3	IL 43 (Harlem Avenue)	Cloverleaf interchange
Cook	Oak Lawn	185.9	299.2	IL 50 (Cicero Avenue)	
Cook	Chicago	191.0	307.4	Halsted Street to I-57 / I-94 east / IL 1	
Cook	Chicago	192.0	309.0	I-94 west (Dan Ryan Expressway)	I-94 exit 62
Cook	Chicago	194.0	312.2	Stony Island Avenue to I-94	Northern terminus of Stony Island Avenue expressway (southbound); at-grade street northbound
Cook	Chicago	196.5	316.2	US 41 north / LMCT (Ewing Avenue north)	Western end of US 41 overlap
Cook	Chicago	197.9	318.5	I-90 Toll west / Chicago Skyway west	Signed as "To I-90 west"; access to I-90 east is in Indiana; I-90 exit 107
Cook	Chicago	198.0	318.7	US 12 east / US 20 east / US 41 south / LMCT (Indianapolis Boulevard) – Hammond	Continuation into Indiana
1.000 mi = 1.609 km; 1.000 km = 0.621 mi: Concurrency terminus; Incomplete access; Tolled

== Business routes ==
US 20 has been rerouted around the cities of Freeport, Rockford, Elgin, and Chicago. A bypass is currently planned for Galena.

The longest US 20 Bus. in Illinois runs 21 miles (34 km) from just west of Rockford to just east of Belvidere. The route begins just west of Weldon Road and runs as State Street into downtown Rockford, where it is split into two one-way streets (Chestnut Street and Walnut Street for eastbound traffic and Jefferson Street for westbound traffic). The route continues east along State Street all the way through Rockford and becomes a two-lane highway between Rockford and Belvidere. US 20 Bus. is then routed in an outer loop around the city of Belvidere before merging back with US 20 near Genoa Road and I-90.

US 20 Bus. in Elgin was removed in 1984. This ran along Larkin Avenue, Highland Avenue, Chicago Street, and Villa Avenue. The current routing of US 20 south of Elgin is called the Elgin Bypass.

US 20 Bus. in Chicago was removed in 1968. This existed from 1960 through 1968; before then, it was US 20 City from 1938 to 1960.

== See also ==
- Stagecoach Trail

U.S. Route 20
Previous state: Iowa	Illinois	Next state: Indiana
