= Ogden Avenue =

East-west arterial avenue in Chicago, Illinois

- William B. Ogden Memorial Highway
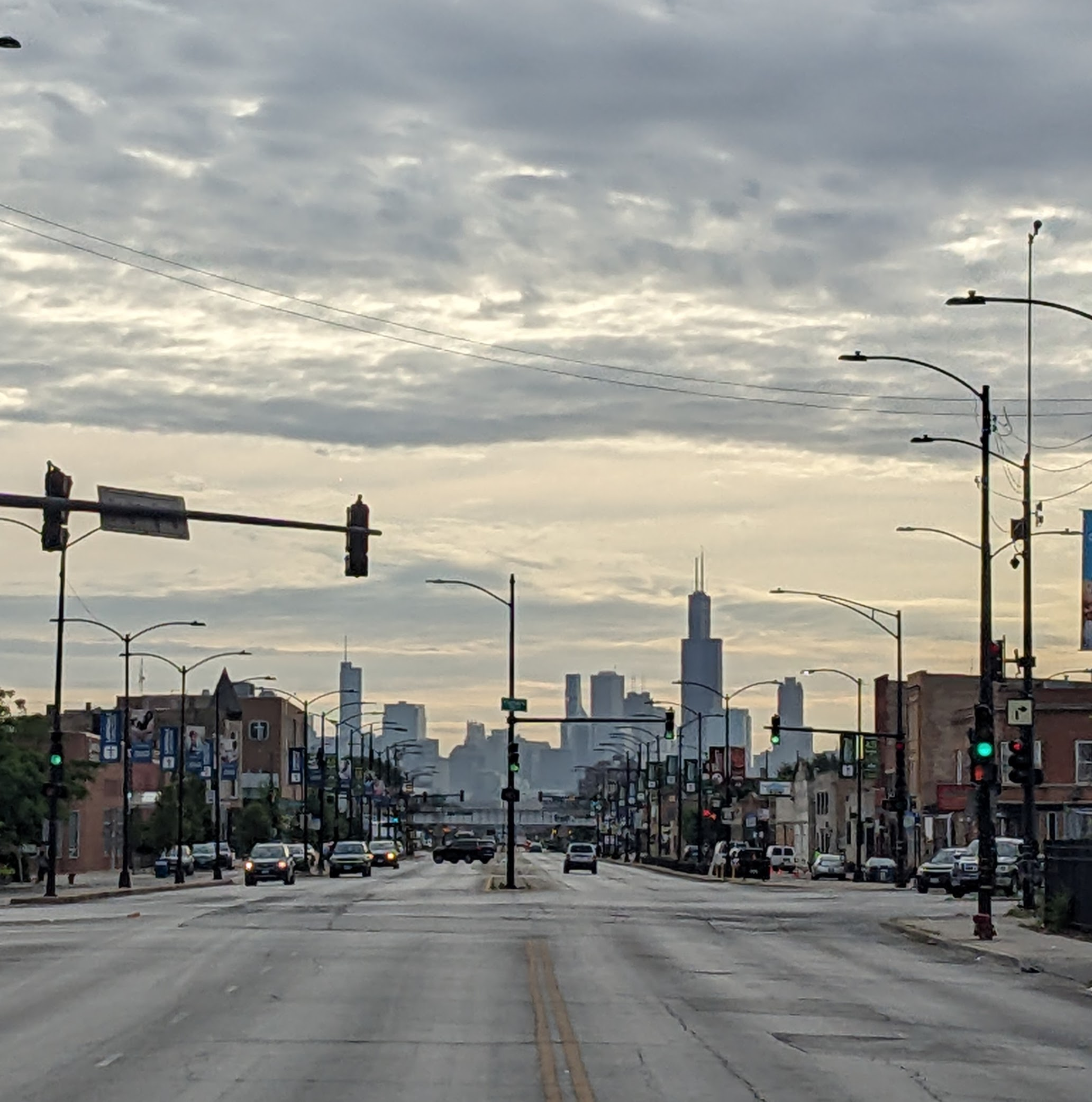
- Ogden Avenue at Pulaski and Cermak, looking toward the Loop
- Interactive map of Ogden Avenue
- Part of: US 34 from Oswego–Montgomery line to the Lyons–Riverside–Berwyn tripoint; US 30 in Montgomery
- Length: 37.5 mi (60.4 km)
- Location: Kendall, Kane, DuPage and Cook counties in Illinois, United States
- Southwest end: US 30 / US 34 at the Oswego–Montgomery line
- Major junctions: US 30 / Lincoln Highway in Montgomery; IL 83 at the Westmont–Clarendon Hills–Hinsdale tripoint; I-294 Toll in Hinsdale–Western Springs line; US 12 / US 20 / US 45 in La Grange; IL 171 in Lyons; US 34 / IL 43 at the Lyons–Riverside–Berwyn tripoint; IL 50 in Cicero; I-90 / I-94 in West Town, Chicago
- Northeast end: Chestnut Street

Ogden Avenue is a street extending from West Town of Chicago to Montgomery in the U.S. state of Illinois. It was named for William B. Ogden, the first mayor of Chicago.

A portion of Ogden Avenue west of Harlem Avenue is part of U.S. Route 34. Ogden Avenue ends when U.S. Route 34 leaves Aurora at the intersection of U.S. Route 34 and U.S. Route 30 on the border of Aurora, Montgomery, and Oswego.

The street intersects Interstate 90/Interstate 94 (Kennedy Expressway) in Chicago, Interstate 294 (Tri-State Tollway) in Western Springs, and Interstate 355 in Lisle. The intersection of U.S. Route 34 (Ogden Avenue) and U.S. Route 12/U.S. Route 20/U.S. Route 45 (LaGrange Road) is one of the few places where four U.S. Routes intersect.

== History ==
The street follows the route of the Southwestern Plank Road, a plank road opened in 1848 across swampy terrain between Chicago and Riverside, Illinois, and, by 1851, extended to Naperville.

In the 1920s the broad avenue became an important arterial carrying auto traffic through the city's West Side. Portions of the avenue carried U.S. Route 66 from the city through adjacent suburbs. It carried US 32 until 1934. Ogden Avenue used to carry U.S. Route 34 to its end as well.

=== Former extension to Lincoln Park ===
The 1909 Plan of Chicago recommended an entire network of new diagonal streets, but the only one ever built was the extension in the 1920s of Ogden from Union Park through the Old Town neighborhood to end at Clark Street opposite Lincoln Park. This extension, largely built in the 1920s, was completed in 1934 with bridges and a connecting viaduct across Goose Island and the North Branch of the Chicago River. In the late 1960s, as part of an urban renewal project for Old Town, the street was vacated in this area and sold off for development. In recent decades, additional portions of Ogden have been abandoned and vacated. The avenue now ends a short distance north of Chicago Avenue.

== Major intersections ==
| County | Location | mi | km | Destinations | Notes |
|---|---|---|---|---|---|
| Kendall | Oswego–Montgomery line | 0.0 | 0.0 | US 30 west (Ogden Falls Boulevard) / US 34 west | Western terminus; western end of US 30 and US 34 concurrencies |
| Kendall | Montgomery | 0.4 | 0.64 | US 30 east / Lincoln Highway (Hill Avenue) | Eastern end of US 30 concurrency |
| Kane | No major junctions | | | | |
notes=Will show all junctions in Kane County
| Kane | Montgomery | 1.3 | 2.1 | to Ring Road | |
| Montgomery | 1.4 | 2.3 | Pointe Boulevard | | |
| Montgomery | 1.6 | 2.6 | Waterford Drive/Ridge Road | | |
| DuPage | Aurora | 3.9 | 6.3 | CR 33 east (75th Street) | |
| DuPage | Aurora–Naperville line | 5.0 | 8.0 | IL 59 | |
| DuPage | Naperville | 7.4 | 11.9 | CR 1 north (Raymond Drive) | Ogden continues at right fork, northern section continues as Raymond Drive |
| DuPage | Naperville | 9.0 | 14.5 | CR 32 north (Mill Street) | |
| DuPage | Naperville | 11.1 | 17.9 | CR 23 north (Naper Boulevard) | |
| DuPage | Lisle | 12.6 | 20.3 | CR 40 (Yackley Avenue) | |
| DuPage | Lisle | 13.3 | 21.4 | IL 53 (Lincoln Avenue) | Interchange |
| DuPage | Downers Grove–Lisle line | 14.5 | 23.3 | I-88 Toll (Ronald Reagan Memorial Tollway) / I-355 Toll (Veterans Memorial Tollway) / IL 110 (CKC) | |
| DuPage | Downers Grove | 15.5 | 24.9 | CR 52 north (Cross Street) | |
| DuPage | Downers Grove | 15.9 | 25.6 | CR 2 (Finley Avenue (north) Belmont Avenue (south)) | |
| DuPage | Downers Grove | 16.9 | 27.2 | CR 9 north (Main Street) | |
| DuPage | Downers Grove | 17.7 | 28.5 | CR 25 north (Fairview Avenue) | |
| DuPage | Westmont | 18.7 | 30.1 | CR 15 north (Cass Avenue) | |
| DuPage | Westmont–Clarendon Hills– Hinsdale tripoint | 20.2 | 32.5 | IL 83 (Kingery Highway) | Interchange |
| Cook | Hinsdale–Western Springs line | 22.0 | 35.4 | I-294 Toll (Tri-State Tollway) – Wisconsin, Indiana | |
| Cook | Western Springs–Westchester line | 22.8 | 36.7 | CR W22 (Wolf Road) | |
| Cook | La Grange | 24.3 | 39.1 | US 12 / US 20 / US 45 (LaGrange Road) | |
| Cook | La Grange–Brookfield line | 24.8 | 39.9 | CR W27 south (East Avenue) | |
| Cook | Lyons | 26.2 | 42.2 | IL 171 (1st Avenue) | |
| Cook | Lyons–Riverside– Berwyn tripoint | 27.9 | 44.9 | IL 43 (Harlem Avenue) / US 34 ends | Eastern end of US 34 concurrency; eastern terminus of US 34 |
| Cook | Cicero | 31.2 | 50.2 | IL 50 (Cicero Avenue) | Quadrant interchange |
| Cook | Chicago | 32.4 | 52.1 | CR W43 south (Pulaski Road) | |
| Cook | Chicago | 34.6 | 55.7 | CR W96 (Western Avenue) | |
| Cook | Chicago | 37.2 | 59.9 | I-90 west / I-94 west (Kennedy Expressway) | Westbound I-90/I-94 entrance; eastbound I-90/I-94 exit |
| Cook | Chicago | 37.5 | 60.4 | West Chestnut Street | Eastern terminus |
1.000 mi = 1.609 km; 1.000 km = 0.621 mi: Concurrency terminus; Electronic toll collection; Incomplete access
