= List of county roads in DuPage County, Illinois =

The DuPage County Highway System is a county-maintained system of arterial county highways in DuPage County, Illinois, United States. They are marked with the standard M1-6 pentagon-shaped highway marker on the base of traffic signals at intersections with other county highways. They are not marked on any freeway or tollway exits or signed with separate reassurance markers. In addition, although concurrencies of county highways exist in the county, they too are not explicitly signed as such.

County Highways 47, 48, 49, 55 and 57 all refer to segments of the Illinois Prairie Path and the Great Western Trail, major bike trails through DuPage County. No motorized traffic is allowed on these trails/highways.

== Route list ==
Number	Length (mi)	Length (km)	Southern or western terminus	Northern or eastern terminus	Local names	Formed	Removed	Notes
CR 1	1.51	2.43	South DuPage–Will county line (87th Street)	CR 33 (West 75th Street)	Plainfield–Naperville Road	—	—	Southern segment, Plainfield-Naperville Road continues south as Will County Highway 14
CR 1	3.24	5.21	US 34 (Ogden Avenue) in Naperville	CH 32 (Warrenville Road) in Warrenville	Raymond Drive, Ferry Road, River Road	—	—	Northern segment
CR 2	4.70	7.56	Washington Street in Naperville	CR 38 (63rd Street) near Woodridge	Hobson Road	—	—	Southwestern segment
CR 2	4.56	7.34	CR 38 (63rd Street) in Downers Grove	IL 56 (Butterfield Road) in Downers Grove	Finley Road, Belmont Road	—	—	Northeastern segment
CR 3	10.63	17.11	CR 14 (North Eola Road) in Aurora	CR 2 (Finley Road) in Downers Grove	Warrenville Road, Ferry Road	—	—	
CR 4	7.05	11.35	CR 21 (Geneva Road) in Glen Ellyn	Devon Avenue in Roselle	Bloomingdale Road, Roselle Road	—	—	Continues north as Cook V60
CR 5	2.08	3.35	IL 53 (Lincoln Avenue) near Lisle	Buena Vista Drive, Raintree Drive in Glen Ellyn	Park Boulevard	—	—	Southern segment
CR 5	3.19	5.13	CR 21 (Geneva Road) in Glen Ellyn	CR 11 (Army Trail Road) in Glendale Heights	Main Street, Glen Ellyn Road	—	—	Northern segment; connects to southern segment via Park Boulevard, IL 38 (Roosevelt Road), and Main Street
CR 6	—	—	East Bartlett limits	CR 6 (South Bartlett Road)	Devon Avenue	—	—	
CR 6	—	—	CR 6 (Devon Avenue)	Schick Road	South Bartlett Road	—	—	Simultaneously runs as Cook B11
CR 7	7.10	11.43	IL 64 (North Avenue) in West Chicago	IL 53 (Columbine Avenue) in Lombard	St. Charles Road	1937	current	Overlaps CR 23 (Gary Avenue) in Carol Stream and CR 21 (Geneva Road) in Glen Ellyn; St. Charles Road continues west to a local business in West Chicago and east to 4th Avenue in Maywood; formerly known as Illinois Route 118
CR 8	—	—	IL 19 (Irving Park Road)	Devon Avenue	North York Road	—	—	Northern segment
CR 8	—	—	Golf Club Entrance	400 feet (120 m) south of Spring Road	South York Road	—	—	Central segment
CR 8	2.85	4.59	I-55 North Frontage Road/Joliet Road	CR 35 (55th Street)	Madison Street	—	—	Southern segment
CR 9	—	—	US 34 (Ogden Avenue)	IL 56 (Butterfield Road)	Main Street – Downers Grove, Highland Avenue	—	—	Northern segment
CR 9	—	—	South DuPage–Cook county line (Bluff Road)	CR 35 (55th Street)	Lemont Road, Main Street – Downers Grove	—	—	Southern segment
CR 10	—	—	Devon Avenue	IL 19 (Irving Park Road)	Arlington Heights Road, Prospect Avenue	—	—	Arlington Heights Road continues north as Cook V69
CR 11	—	—	Munger Road in Wayne	IL 53 (Rohlwing Road) in Addison	Army Trail Road	—	—	Army Trail Road continues west to IL 25 near Wayne and East to John F. Kennedy Drive in Addison
CR 13	—	—	CR 53 (Diehl Road) in Warrenville	IL 38 (Roosevelt Road) in Winfield	Winfield Road	—	—	
CR 14	4.35	7.00	East New York Street in Aurora	IL 56 (Butterfield Road) in Aurora	Eola Road	—	—	
CR 15	—	—	US 34 (Ogden Avenue) in Westmont	IL 38 (Roosevelt Road) in Oakbrook Terrace	Summit Avenue, Midwest Road, Cass Avenue	—	—	Northern segment
CR 15	—	—	91st Street near Darien	CR 35 (55th Street)	South Cass Avenue	—	—	Southern segment
CR 17	—	—	Julian Street in Naperville	Dunham Road in Downers Grove	Maple Avenue, Chicago Avenue	—	—	
CR 18	—	—	IL 38 (Roosevelt Road)	IL 64 (North Avenue)	Powis Road, Hawthorne Lane, Kress Road	—	—	Southern segment
CR 18	—	—	CR 29 (Stearns Road)	North DuPage–Cook county line	Munger Road	—	—	Northern Segment. Munger Road continues north as Cook V44
CR 20	2.44	3.93	US 20 (Lake Street)	East DuPage–Cook county line (County Line Road)	Grand Avenue	—	—	Grand Avenue continues east through Cook County to US 41 (Lake Shore Drive) in Chicago
CR 21	—	—	IL 59 (Neltnor Boulevard) in West Chicago	Main Street – Glen Ellyn in Glen Ellyn	Geneva Road, Washington Street	—	—	Eastern segment
CR 21	—	—	West DuPage-Kane county line	IL 38 (Roosevelt Road)	Fabyan Parkway	—	—	Western segment
CR 22	2.29	3.69	US 20 (Lake Street) in Addison	IL 19 (Irving Park Road) in Itasca	Addison Road	—	—	Addison Road continues north to Thorndale Avenue in Itasca as Prospect Avenue, and south to St. Charles Road in Villa Park
CR 23	—	—	US 34 (Ogden Avenue) in Naperville	IL 38 (Roosevelt Road) in Wheaton	Naper Boulevard, Naperville Road	—	—	Southern segment
CR 23	7.68	12.36	CR 27 (Jewell Road) in Wheaton	DuPage–Cook county line south of IL 390 near Roselle	Gary Avenue	—	—	Northern segment
CR 24	4.23	6.81	CR 11 Army Trail Road near Glendale Heights	IL 390 (Elgin-O'Hare Tollway) in Medinah	Walter Drive, Byron Avenue, Medinah Road	—	—	Walter Drive and Byron Avenue are used as connectors to US 20 (Lake Street and Medinah Country Club between Army Trail Road. These roads are residential and therefore lightly travelled.
CR 25	—	—	US 34 (Ogden Avenue) in Downers Grove	IL 38 (Roosevelt Road) in Lombard	Meyers Road, Fairview Avenue	—	—	
CR 26	4.0	6.4	800 feet (240 m) West of Park Boulevard in Elk Grove Village	North York Road in Bensenville	Thorndale Avenue	—	2017	Thorndale Avenue continues west to I-290 and IL 390; this highway was replaced by IL 390 in November 1, 2017
CR 27	—	—	CR 43 (County Farm Road)	CR 23 (Gary Avenue)	Jewell Road	—	—	Eastern segment
CR 27	—	—	CR 21 (Geneva Road) near West Chicago	Winfield Road	Highlake Road, Prince Crossing Road	—	—	Western segment
CR 28	—	—	IL 64 (North Avenue) in Villa Park	Devon Avenue in Elk Grove Village	Villa Avenue, Wood Dale Road	—	—	Villa Avenue continues 3.20 miles (5.15 km) south to IL 38 (Roosevelt Road) in Villa Park
CR 29	—	—	West DuPage–Kane county line in Wayne	CR 6 (South Bartlett Road) in Bartlett	Stearns Road	—	—	Western segment
CR 29	—	—	CR 43 (County Farm Road) in Hanover Park	US 20 (Lake Street) in Hanover Park	Greenbrook Boulevard	—	—	Eastern segment
CR 31	—	—	CR 9 (Lemont Road) in Darien	East DuPage–Cook county line (County Line Road)	Plainfield Road	—	—	Eastern Segment. Plainfield Road continues east as Cook B37
CR 31	—	—	West DuPage-Will county line in Woodridge, 500 feet (150 m) west of CR 56 (Woodward Avenue)	CR 9 (Lemont Road) in Darien	87th Street	—	—	Western segment
CR 32	—	—	US 34 (Ogden Avenue) in Naperville	CR 3 (Ferry Road), CR 32 (Warrenville Road) in Warrenville	Mill Street	—	—	
CR 32	—	—	CR 1 (River Road)	CR 3 (Ferry Road/Warrenville Road), CR 32 (Mill Street)	Warrenville Road	—	—	
CR 33	14.47	23.29	US 34 (Ogden Avenue) in Aurora	IL 83 (Kingery Highway) in Willowbrook	75th Street	—	—	Longest county highway in DuPage County
CR 34	4.74	7.63	East DuPage–Cook county line (just west of I-294 in Oak Brook)	CR 9 (Highland Avenue)	31st Street/Oak Brook Road	—	—	
CR 35	5.25	8.45	Dunham Road	East DuPage–Cook county line (County Line Road)	55th Street	—	—	
CR 36	3.55	5.71	CR 21 (Geneva Road) in Wheaton	CR 11 (Army Trail Road) in Bloomingdale	Schmale Road	—	—	Schmale Road continues south of Geneva Road as Main Street to Farnham Lane in Wheaton
CR 38	—	—	CR 2 (Hobson Road) in Woodridge	CR 8 (Madison Street) in Willowbrook	63rd Street	—	—	
CR 40	—	—	CR 33 (East 75th Street) in Naperville	CR 3 (Warrenville Road) in Lisle	Wehrli Road, College Road, Yackley Avenue	—	—	
CR 41	0.31	0.50	Janes Avenue near Downers Grove	CR 2 (Belmont Road) in Downers Grove	Hobson Road	—	2021	No longer a county highway as of 2021
CR 43	9.11	14.66	IL 38 (Roosevelt Road) in Wheaton	DuPage–Cook county line south of US 20 (Lake Street) in Hanover Park	County Farm Road	—	—	County Farm Road continues north to US 20 (Lake Street), then as Barrington Road to IL 59 in Barrington
CR 47	—	—	West DuPage–Kane county line	Liberty Drive	Illinois Prairie Path – Aurora Branch	—	—	
CR 47	—	—	Carlton Avenue	East DuPage–Cook county line (I-294 [Tri-State Tollway])	Illinois Prairie Path – Main Stem	—	—	
CR 48	—	—	Liberty Street	West DuPage–Kane county line	Illinois Prairie Path – Elgin Branch	—	—	
CR 49	—	—	West DuPage–Kane county line (300 feet [91 m] south of IL 56 [Butterfield Road])	I-88 (Ronald Reagan Memorial Tollway); IL 110 (CKC)	Illinois Prairie Path – Batavia Spur	—	—	
CR 50	1.29	2.08	CR 43 (County Farm Road) in Hanover Park	CR 23 (Gary Avenue) in Bloomingdale	Schick Road	—	—	Schick Road continues west to IL 59 in Bartlett and east to Glen Ellyn Road in Bloomingdale
CR 51	1.1	1.8	CR 3 (Warrenville Road) near Naperville	IL 56 (Butterfield Road) near Wheaton	Herrick Road	—	—	
CR 52	0.2	0.32	US 34 (Ogden Avenue)	CR 3 (Warrenville Road)	Cross Street	—	—	Shortest county highway in DuPage County
CR 53	—	—	CR 1 (Raymond Drive) near Naperville	CR 32 (Mill Street) in Warrenville	Diehl Road	—	—	
CR 54	1.29	2.08	CR 7 (St. Charles Road) near Glen Ellyn	Collins Avenue in Glendale Heights	Swift Road	—	—	Swift Road continues north to Nordic Road in Bloomingdale
CR 55	—	—	Illinois Prairie Path – Elgin Branch	East of Salt Creek/West Avenue in Elmhurst	Great Western Trail	—	—	
CR 56	1.63	2.62	CR 33 (75th Street) in Woodridge	CR 31 (87th Street) in Woodridge	Woodward Avenue	—	—	
CR 57	—	—	West DuPage–Kane county line (Kautz Road)	CR 43 (County Farm Road) in Winfield	Illinois Prairie Path – Geneva Spur	—	—	
CR 59	0.28	0.45	I-88 (Ronald Reagan Memorial Tollway); IL 110 (CKC) in Naperville	CR 3 (Warrenville Road) in Naperville	Freedom Drive	2012	current	
CR 60	0.3	0.48	Prospect Avenue in Itasca	Arlington Heights Road in Itasca	North Thorndale Avenue, Ketter Drive	2018	current	Westbound only, western segment
CR 61	0.3	0.48	Prospect Avenue in Itasca	Arlington Heights Road in Itasca	South Thorndale Avenue	2018	current	Eastbound only, western segment
CR 61	2.5	4.0	Mittel Drive in Wood Dale	York Road in Bensenville	South Thorndale Avenue	2018	current	Eastern segment
