= Stearns Road =

County road in metro Chicago, USA

- Joyce. C Stearns Memorial Highway; Greenbrook Boulevard
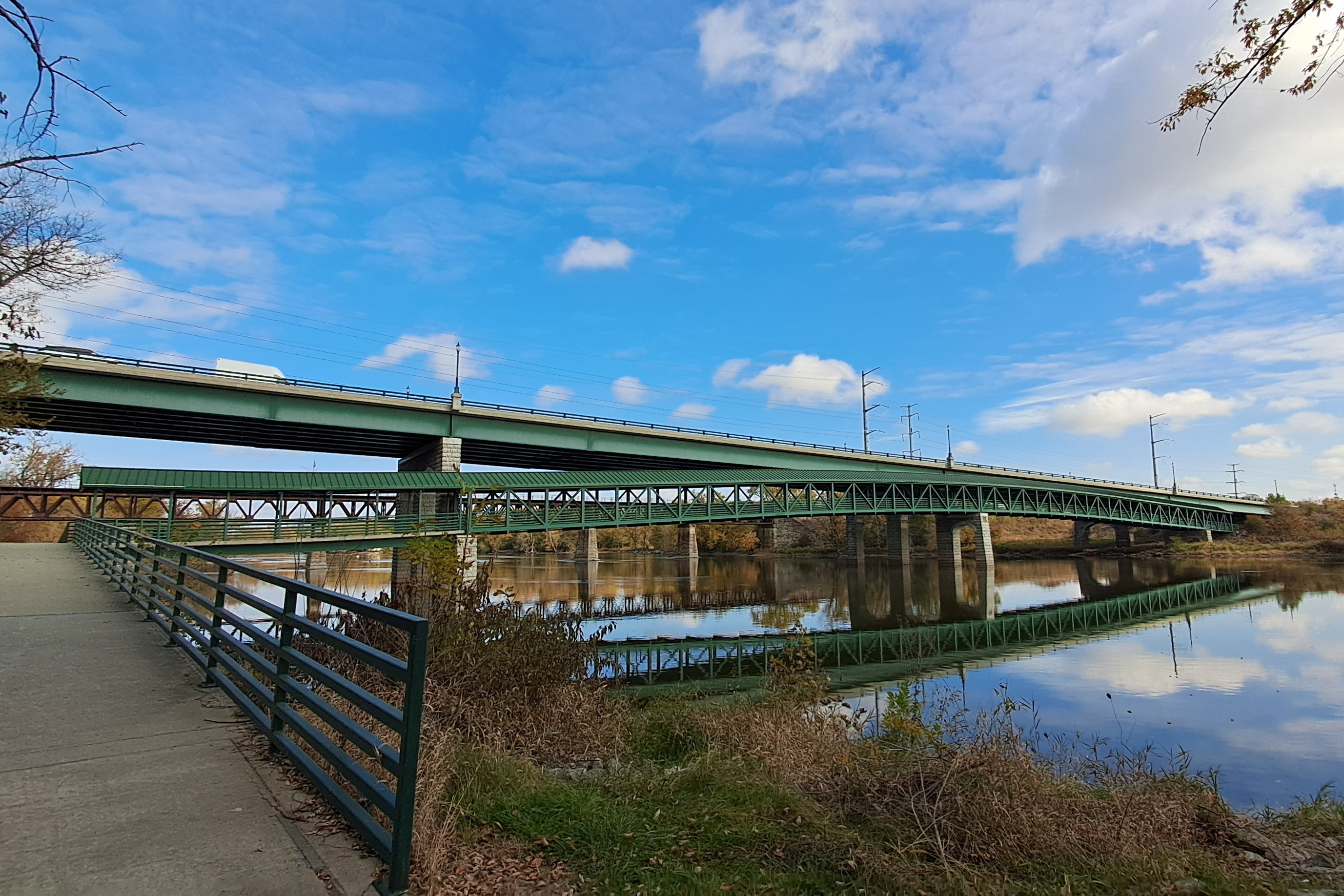
- Stearns Road crossing above the Fox River.
- Part of: IL 25 / CR 29 / CR 37
- Maintained by: Various local agencies
- Length: 11.1 mi (17.9 km)
- Location: South Elgin, Wayne, Bartlett, Hanover Park
- West end: CR 34 / Randall Road / McDonald Road in South Elgin
- East end: US 20 / Lake Street in Hanover Park

Stearns Road is a major county road in the Chicago Metropolitan Area in parts of DuPage and Kane counties, Illinois, United States. Stearns Road begins at Kane County Highway 34 (Randall Road) in South Elgin and continues east into Greenbrook Boulevard and ends at U.S. Route 20 in Hanover Park. Parts of Stearns Road are signed as Illinois Route 25, DuPage County Route 29, and Kane County Route 37. This is a distance of about 11.1 miles (17.9 km).

== History ==
Stearns Road began at Dunham Road until the bridge corridor was opened to traffic on December 15, 2010. This award-winning project includes 4.6 miles (7.4 km) of new road alignment that extends from approximately the Kane–DuPage county line to Randall Road, along with a new Fox River Bridge crossing.

== Major intersections ==
County	Location	mi	km	Destinations	Notes
Kane	South Elgin	0.0	0.0	CR 34 (Randall Road)	Western terminus
Kane	South Elgin	1.4	2.3	McLean Boulevard to IL 31	
Kane	Wayne	3.3	5.3	IL 25 south	Western end of IL 25 overlap
Kane	Bartlett	4.0	6.4	IL 25 north / CR 19 south (Dunham Road)	Eastern end of IL 25 overlap
DuPage	Bartlett	6.4	10.3	CR 18 (Munger Road)	
DuPage	Bartlett	7.2	11.6	IL 59 (Sutton Road)	
DuPage	Bartlett	10.1	16.3	CR 43 (County Farm Road)	Start of Greenbrook Boulevard section
DuPage	Hanover Park	11.1	17.9	US 20 (Lake Street) to IL 390 Toll east (Elgin-O'Hare Tollway)	Eastern terminus
1.000 mi = 1.609 km; 1.000 km = 0.621 mi: Concurrency terminus
