= Munger Road (film) =

- Film poster
- Directed by: Nicholas Smith
- Written by: Nicholas Smith
- Produced by: Kyle Heller
- Starring: Bruce Davison
- Cinematography: Westley Gathright
- Edited by: Robert Cauble
- Music by: Wojciech Golczewski
- Production company: Insomnia Productions
- Distributed by: Freestyle Releasing
- Release date: September 30, 2011 (St. Charles)
- Running time: 86 minutes
- Country: United States
- Language: English

Munger Road is a 2011 American independent horror film starring Bruce Davison. It is based on the haunted namesake road located in the state of Illinois. The film was written and directed by Nicholas Smith, a St. Charles native.

== Plot ==
In St. Charles, IL, during the town's Scarecrow Fest, two teenaged couples (Joe, Corey, Scott and Rachel) take their SUV down to Munger Road to test a local urban legend. Simultaneously, a convicted killer escapes from his transport to another jail and starts a murder spree. Two police officers in town look to capture the killer without disturbing the town festival.

The teenagers, back at their vehicle, test to see if the children will push their SUV off the railroad track crossing by dusting the bumper with baby powder. The teenage girls are momentarily tricked by their boyfriends into believing that the spirits moved the vehicle. The girls become upset at being tricked and ask to go home. The boys try to start the vehicle, but are unable to do so. One of the couples decides to stay with the vehicle, while the other tries to walk to town for help.

The teens are slowly picked off by the escaped murderer while the police search to stop him.

== Cast ==
- Bruce Davison as Chief Kirkhoven
- Randall Batinkoff as Deputy Hendricks
- Trevor Morgan as Corey LaFayve
- Brooke Peoples as Joe Risk
- Hallock Beals as Scott Claussen
- Lauren Storm as Rachel Donahue
- Art Fox as Mayor Swanson
- Maggie Henry as Nancy
- Bill J. Stevens as Father McCroy
- Ron Johnston as Lenny
- Judy Proudfoot Schenck as Judy

== Production ==
The film was shot in the Illinois cities of Bartlett, St. Charles, Elburn, Geneva and Sugar Grove.

== Reception ==
Roger Ebert awarded the film three stars. Brad McHargue of Dread Central criticized the ending of the film.
