= Illinois Route 59 =

State highway in northeastern Illinois, US

Illinois Route 59
- Sutton Road; Kerry Sheridan Memorial Highway
- IL 59 highlighted in red

Route information
- Maintained by IDOT
- Length: 71.13 mi (114.47 km)
- Existed: 1924–present

Major junctions
- South end: I-55 in Shorewood
- US 52 in Shorewood; US 30 / IL 126 in Plainfield; US 34 in Aurora I-88 Toll / IL 110 (CKC) in Naperville; US 20 in Bartlett I-90 Toll in Hoffman Estates; US 14 in Barrington; US 12 in Wauconda; US 12 in Fox Lake
- North end: IL 173 in Antioch

Location
- Country: United States
- State: Illinois
- Counties: Will, DuPage, Cook, Lake

Highway system
- Illinois State Highway System; Interstate; US; State; Tollways; Scenic
| ← IL 58 | → US 60 |

Illinois Route 59 is a north–south state highway in northeastern Illinois. It runs south from Illinois Route 173 in Antioch to I-55 in Shorewood, spanning the north–south width of Chicago's western suburbs. This is a distance of 71.13 miles (114.47 km).

== Route description ==
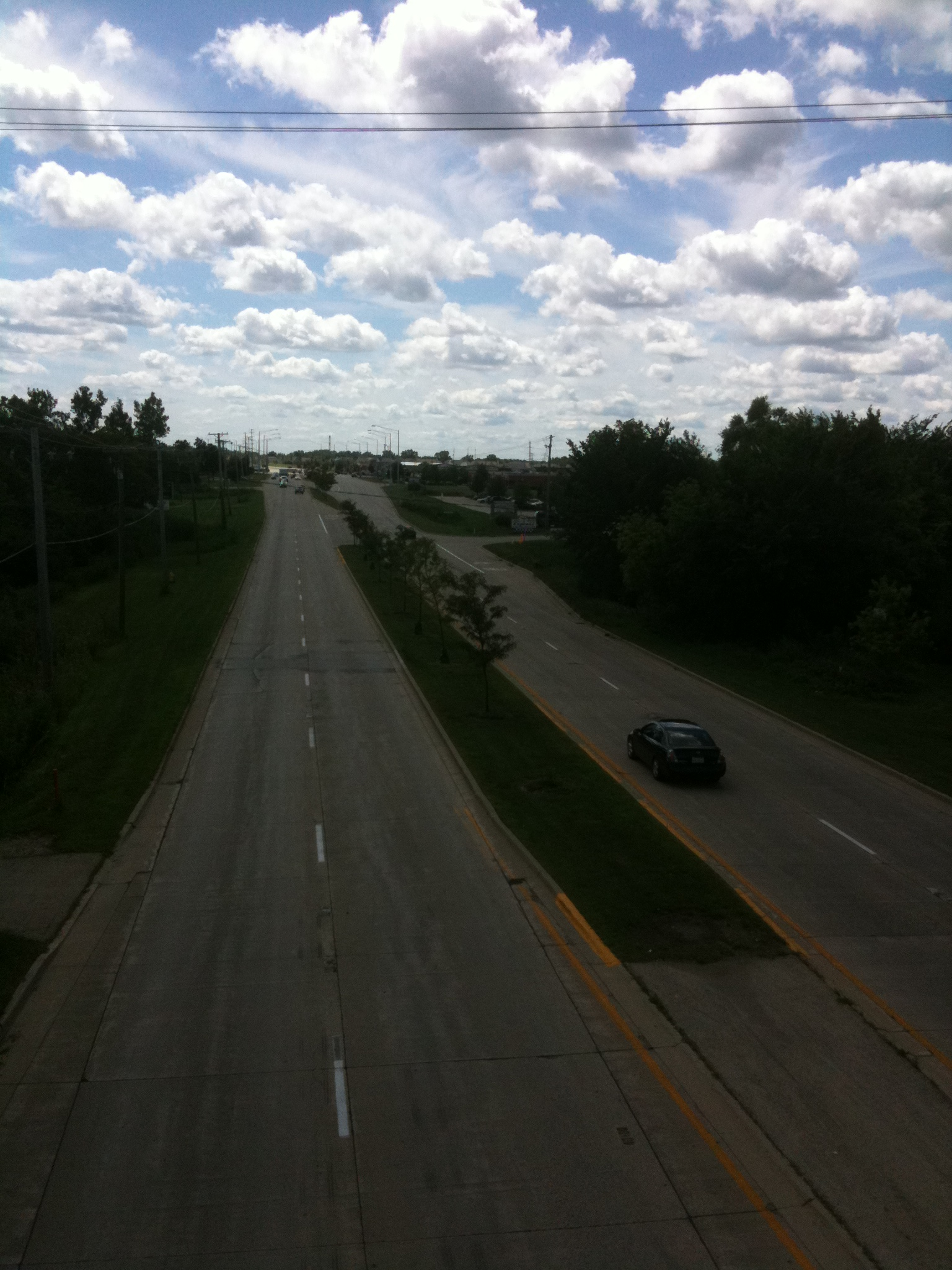
Facing south along Illinois Route 59, taken from the Illinois Prairie Path.

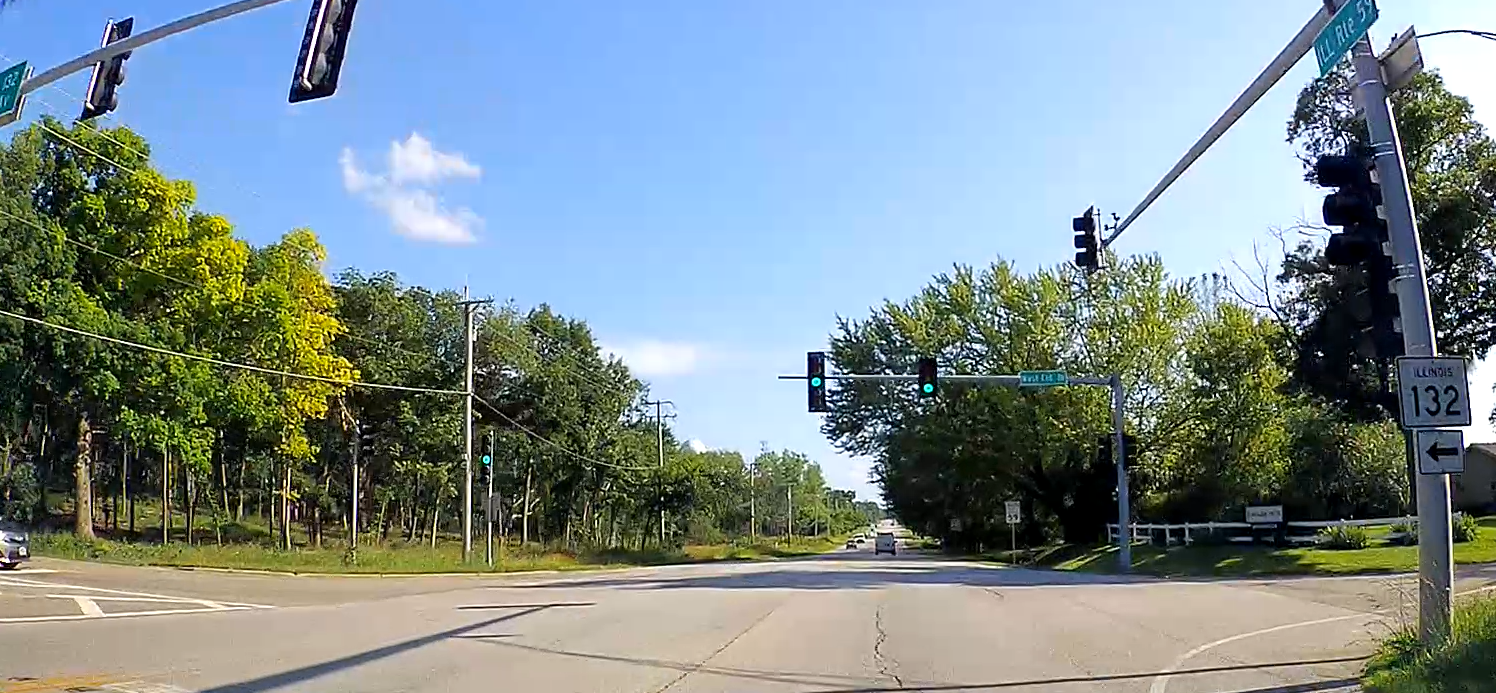
Intersection of IL 59 and IL 132 in Fox Lake Hills. Image taken traveling southbound on 59.

IL 59 is a major four-lane arterial for most of its length, running parallel to and about five miles (8 km) east of the Fox River in Illinois, and thirty miles (48 km) west of Chicago's State Street. It is especially congested in the suburbs of Aurora and Naperville, where traffic counts average 40,000-55,000 vehicles per day. To accommodate the congestion, the 7.5-mile stretch between Ferry Road and 95th Street has been widened to six lanes. Most portions along IL 59 are zoned for commercial uses, however there are extensive stretches of residential areas along the road in West Chicago, Barrington, and Fox Lake Hills. IL 59 is the only numbered highway with a Metra station named after it: the Route 59 station on the BNSF Line, which differentiates the station from the Naperville and Aurora stations.

IL 59 is called Lake Street in Antioch, Fox Lake Road in Fox Lake Hills, Grand Avenue in portions of Ingleside and eastern Fox Lake, Sutton Road from South Barrington to Bartlett, Neltnor Boulevard in West Chicago, Hough Street in Barrington, and Brook Forest Avenue and Cottage Street in Shorewood.

IL 59 overlaps U.S. Route 12 (Rand Road) between Wauconda and Fox Lake.

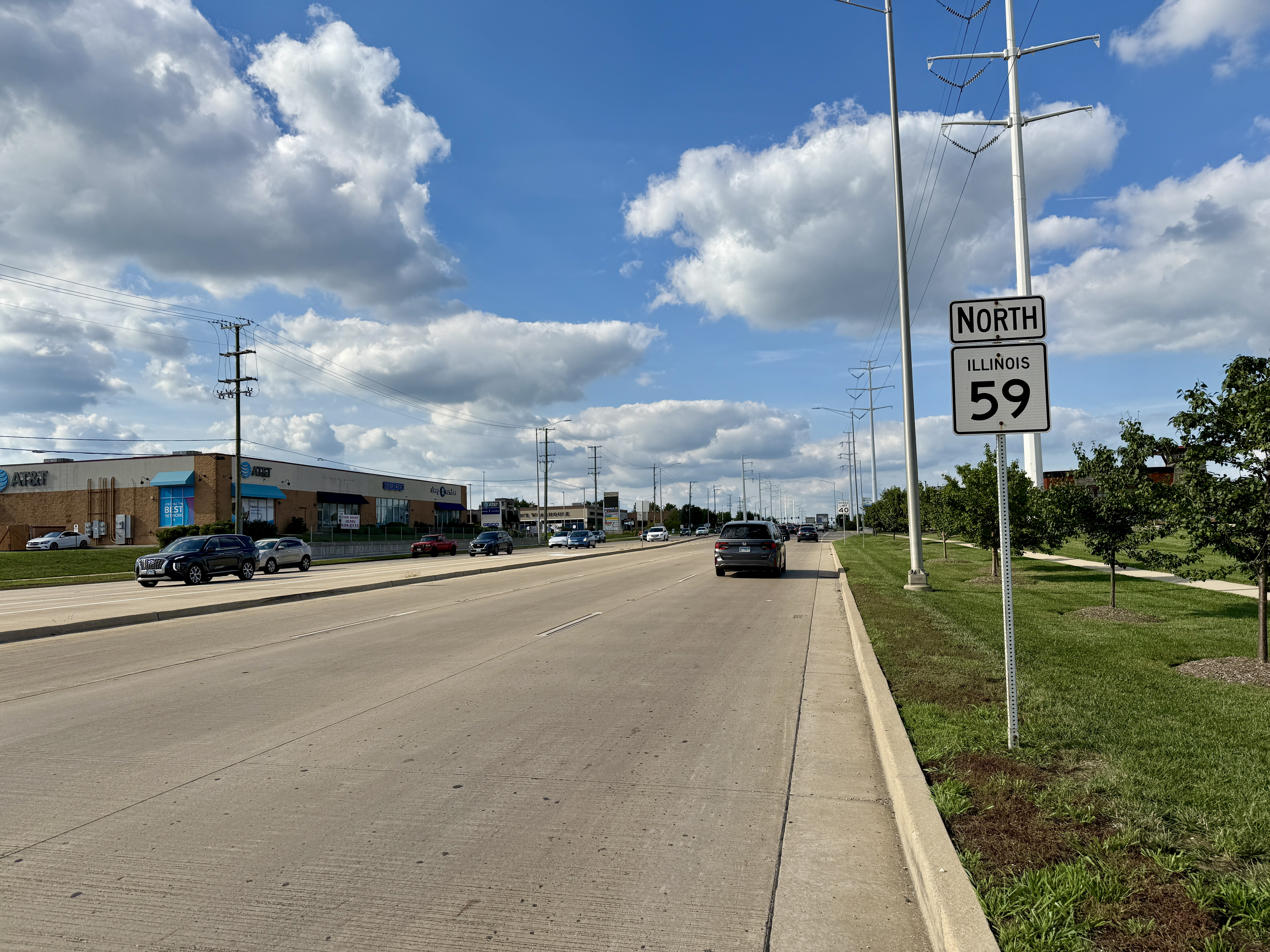
IL 59 northbound along the border of Aurora and Naperville

In almost every town or village spanning IL 59, retail development and residential sprawl can be found. The IL 59 corridor includes regional shopping areas in the Naperville/Aurora area, the Hoffman Estates/South Barrington/Streamwood area, the Plainfield area, and the Joliet/Shorewood area. The IL 59 corridor also includes large community retail areas in Volo/Fox Lake, Wauconda, Bartlett, West Chicago, and Warrenville. IL 59 also travels through the Barrington Historic District and is proximate to significant office complexes and job centers at its junctions with Interstate 90 and Interstate 88; these intersecting corridors of commerce are known as the Golden Corridor and the Illinois Technology and Research Corridor respectively. The regional shopping malls Westfield Fox Valley in Aurora and The Arboretum of South Barrington can also be found along the IL 59 corridor.

== History ==
SBI Route 59 ran from Joliet to Antioch on the current IL 59. It was replaced by U.S. Route 66 as U.S. 66 made its way onto a new highway in 1940; by 1957, IL 59 had been returned to its original state.

The Illinois Department of Transportation opened a diverging diamond interchange at IL 59 and Interstate 88 in September 2015.

== Major intersections ==
| County | Location | mi | km | Destinations | Notes |
|---|---|---|---|---|---|
| Will | Shorewood | 0.0 | 0.0 | I-55 to I-80; Gateway Boulevard | Southern terminus of IL 59; southern end of Kerry Sheridan Memorial Highway; I-55 exit 251; a diverging-diamond interchange (DDI) since October 7, 2024 |
| Will | Shorewood | 1.5 | 2.4 | US 52 (Jefferson Street) to I-55 | |
| Will | Joliet–Shorewood city line | 3.1 | 5.0 | Northern end of Kerry Sheridan Memorial Highway | |
| Will | Joliet–Plainfield city line | 4.5 | 7.2 | Southern end of PFC Andrew Meari Memorial Highway | |
| Will | Plainfield | 7.2 | 11.6 | US 30 east / Lincoln Highway east (Joliet Road) | Southern end of US 30/Lincoln Highway concurrency |
| Will | Plainfield | 7.4 | 11.9 | Lincoln Highway west (Lockport Street) | Northern end of Lincoln Highway concurrency |
| Will | Plainfield | 7.8 | 12.6 | IL 126 (Main Street) | Northern end of PFC Andrew Meari Memorial Highway |
| Will | Plainfield | 8.5 | 13.7 | US 30 west (143rd Street) | Northern end of US 30 concurrency |
| Will | Naperville | 12.5 | 20.1 | CR 66 east (Hassert Boulevard) / 111th Street | Western terminus of CR 66 |
| DuPage | Aurora–Naperville city line | 17.1 | 27.5 | CR 33 (75th Street) | |
| DuPage | Aurora–Naperville city line | 17.5 | 28.2 | US 34 (Ogden Avenue) | |
| DuPage | Naperville | 21.0 | 33.8 | I-88 Toll / IL 110 (CKC) (Ronald Reagan Memorial Tollway) – DeKalb, Chicago | Diverging diamond interchange; I-88 exit 123 |
| DuPage | Naperville | 21.6 | 34.8 | CR 3 (Ferry Road) | |
| DuPage | Warrenville | 22.2 | 35.7 | IL 56 (Butterfield Road) | |
| DuPage | West Chicago | 25.2 | 40.6 | IL 38 (Roosevelt Road) – Wheaton, Geneva | Interchange |
| DuPage | West Chicago | 26.8 | 43.1 | CR 21 east (Washington Street) | Western terminus of CR 21 |
| DuPage | West Chicago | 29.2 | 47.0 | IL 64 (North Avenue) | Red light camera enforcement intersection (southbound only) |
| DuPage | Bartlett | 31.4 | 50.5 | CR 11 (Army Trail Road) | |
| DuPage | Bartlett | 33.4 | 53.8 | CR 29 (Stearns Road) | |
| Cook | Bartlett | 34.8 | 56.0 | CR B10 west (West Bartlett Road) | |
| Cook | Bartlett | 35.7 | 57.5 | US 20 (Lake Street) – Elgin, Chicago | Interchange |
| Cook | Streamwood | 36.5 | 58.7 | IL 19 (Irving Park Road) | |
| Cook | Streamwood | 37.4 | 60.2 | CR A66 (Schaumburg Road) | |
| Cook | Hoffman Estates | 38.3 | 61.6 | CR A63 east (Bode Road) | |
| Cook | Hoffman Estates | 38.4 | 61.8 | IL 58 (Golf Road) | |
| Cook | Hoffman Estates | 39.5 | 63.6 | CR A62 (Shoe Factory Road) | |
| Cook | Hoffman Estates | 39.9 | 64.2 | I-90 Toll (Jane Addams Memorial Tollway) – Chicago, Rockford | I-90 exit 59 |
| Cook | Hoffman Estates–South Barrington village line | 40.4 | 65.0 | IL 72 (Higgins Road) | |
| Cook | Sutton–South Barrington line | 41.9 | 67.4 | CR A57 (Penny Road) | |
| Cook | Barrington Hills | 43.0 | 69.2 | CR V47 east (Bartlett Road) | |
| Cook | Barrington Hills | 43.3 | 69.7 | IL 62 / IL 68 west (Algonquin Road) | Southern end of IL 68 concurrency |
| Cook | Barrington Hills | 44.7 | 71.9 | IL 68 east (Dundee Road) | Northern end of IL 68 concurrency |
| Lake | Barrington | 47.5 | 76.4 | US 14 (Northwest Highway, Ronald Reagan Highway) | |
| Lake | North Barrington | 49.5 | 79.7 | IL 22 | |
| Lake | Lake Barrington | 50.7 | 81.6 | CR A42 (Miller Road) | |
| Lake | Tower Lakes | 52.5 | 84.5 | CR V49 south (Kelsey Road) | Northern terminus of CR V49 |
| Lake | Wauconda | 54.1 | 87.1 | US 12 east (Rand Road) | Southern end of US 12 concurrency; interchange |
| Lake | Wauconda | 55.1 | 88.7 | IL 176 (Liberty Street, Wauconda Road) | Interchange |
| Lake | Volo | 59.7 | 96.1 | IL 120 (Belvidere Road) | |
| Lake | Fox Lake | 62.9 | 101.2 | IL 134 east / CR A26 west (Big Hollow Road) | Western terminus of IL 134; eastern terminus of CR A26 |
| Lake | Fox Lake | 63.4 | 102.0 | US 12 west | Northern end of US 12 concurrency; interchange |
| Lake | Fox Lake Hills–Lake Villa village line | 67.6 | 108.8 | IL 132 east (Grand Avenue) | Western terminus of IL 132 |
| Lake | Antioch | 71.13 | 114.47 | IL 173 (173rd Airborne Brigade Highway) to IL 83 | Northern terminus of IL 59 |
1.000 mi = 1.609 km; 1.000 km = 0.621 mi: Concurrency terminus; Incomplete access; Route transition
