= Army Trail Road =

Roadway in Illinois

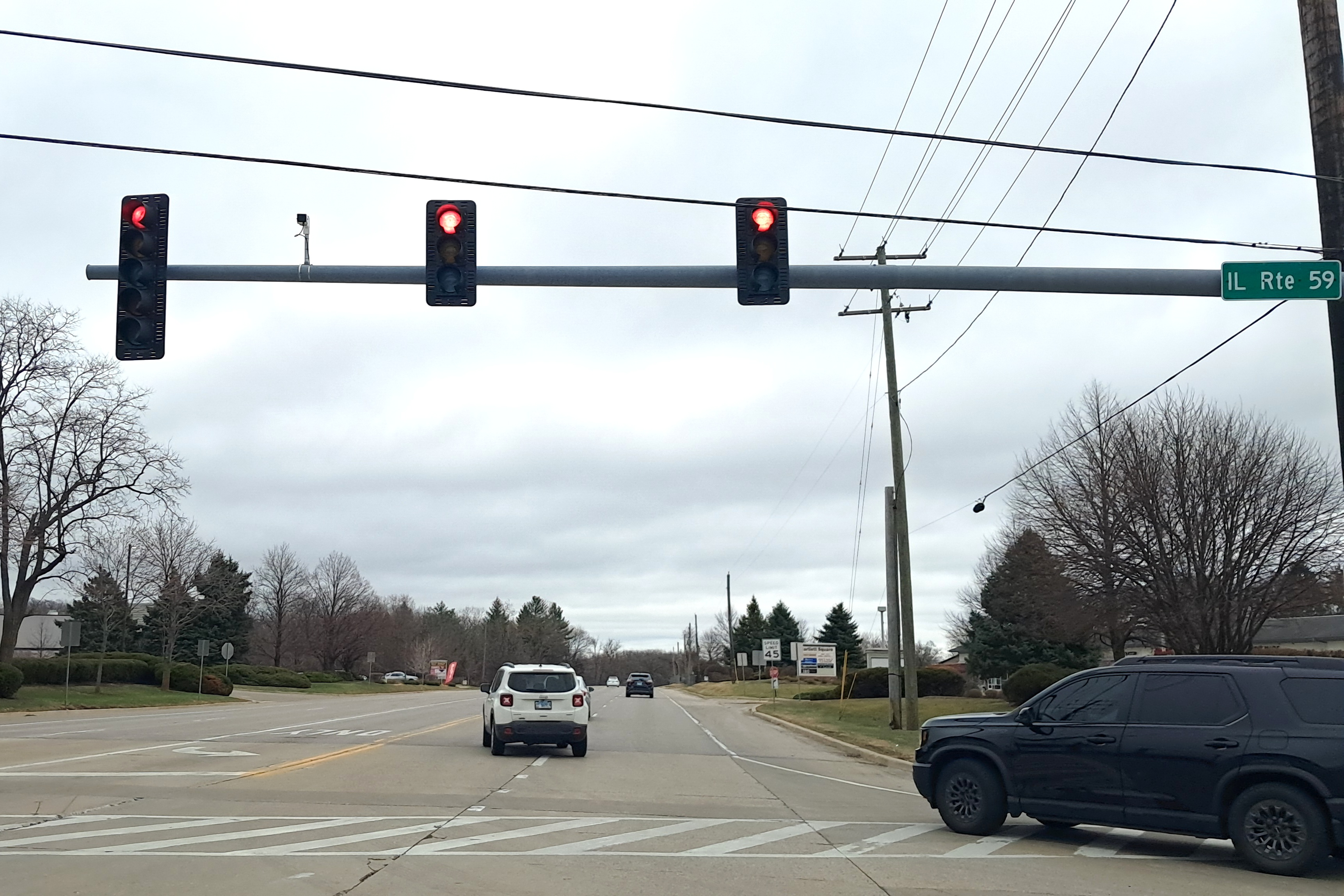
- Army Trail Road at IL 59
- Part of: CR 11 / CR 20
- Length: 16.4 mi (26.4 km)
- Location: Kane County, DuPage County
- West end: Illinois Route 25 in Wayne, near Fox River Bluff F.P.
- East end: Cul-de-sac near Village Hall in Addison

Army Trail Road is a 16.4-mile (26.4 km) county road in parts of DuPage and Kane Counties, Illinois. Army Trail Road begins at Illinois Route 25 in Wayne and ends at the Addison Village Hall east of John F. Kennedy Drive in a cul de sac in Addison. Parts of Army Trail Road are signed as DuPage County Highway 11 and Kane County Highway 20.

== Route description ==
Army Trail Road begins at a junction with Illinois 25 in Wayne. From here, the road heads east through a residential forested area to County Highway 19 (Dunham Road). Past Dunham Road, the road briefly becomes County Highway 20 before entering DuPage County. The road continues east through Wayne to Munger Road, where it becomes County Highway 11. Army Trail Road then passes Illinois Route 59 and heads east along the border of Bartlett and Carol Stream. The route passes to the north of two small lakes before entering a developed residential area. It continues east through Bloomingdale and Glendale Heights, intersecting County Highway 4 (Bloomingdale Road) near Black Hawk Elementary School. After passing County Highways 5 (Glen Ellyn Road) and 24 (Walter Road), the road runs through a county forest preserve before intersecting Interstate 355 in Addison. Past the interstate, the road meets Illinois Route 53, the eastern terminus of County Highway 11. Army Trail Road continues through residential Addison, passing to the south of Addison Trail High School. The road ends at a cul-de-sac near Addison Village Hall; its terminus almost intersects U.S. Route 20, which connects to Army Trail Road via John F. Kennedy Drive.

== History ==
Army Trail Road followed an Indian Trail for early settlers who traveled in covered wagons in the early 19th century that was part of a trail that continued on to Burlington Road running northwest until it reached Galena, IL. Its name is based on the fact that General Winfield Scott's troops used this route during the Black Hawk War. Near its end at the Fox River is a stone marking the graves of U.S. Army soldiers of the Indian War era.

Until December 1989, Army Trail Road was the southern terminus of the freeway portion of Illinois Route 53, which was subsequently designated I-355. In December 1989, the North-South Tollway was opened extending the limited access highway south to I-55 and reducing the traffic flow caused by the concurrency of Route 53 and a short stretch of Army Trail Road.

In late 2004, construction began on parts of the road to widen the road to six lanes. A divider was to be set in place including new turn lanes and paving of the road. Project has completed sections of the road in Addison and was expected to be completed in November 2005. It is four lanes in parts east of Illinois Highway 59 to a few hundred feet west of Illinois Highway 59 where it enters the Village of Wayne, Illinois. It remains two lanes to its western end at Illinois Highway 25 and is "rural" looking through Wayne and its horse farms.

== Major intersections ==
County	Location	mi	km	Destinations	Notes
Kane	Wayne	0.0	0.0	IL 25	
DuPage	Bartlett	5.0	8.0	IL 59 (Pramukh Swami Maharaj Road)	
DuPage	Carol Stream–Hanover Park village line	8.0	12.9	CR 43 (County Farm Road)	
DuPage	Bloomingdale	9.6	15.4	CR 23 (Gary Avenue)	
DuPage	Bloomingdale	10.5	16.9	CR 36 south (Schmale Road)	Northern terminus of CR 36
DuPage	Glendale Heights	11.6	18.7	CR 4 (Bloomingdale Road)	
DuPage	Bloomingdale	12.5	20.1	CR 5 south (Glen Ellyn Road)	North terminus of CR 5
DuPage	Addison	13.9	22.4	I-355 Toll (Veterans Memorial Tollway)	
DuPage	Addison	14.2	22.9	IL 53 (Rohlwing Road)	Eastern terminus of CR 11
DuPage	Addison	16.4	26.4	Cul-de-sac in Addison	Eastern terminus
1.000 mi = 1.609 km; 1.000 km = 0.621 mi
