= Julien Dubuque Bridge =

Bridge in Illinois and Iowa, U.S.

- U.S. National Register of Historic Places
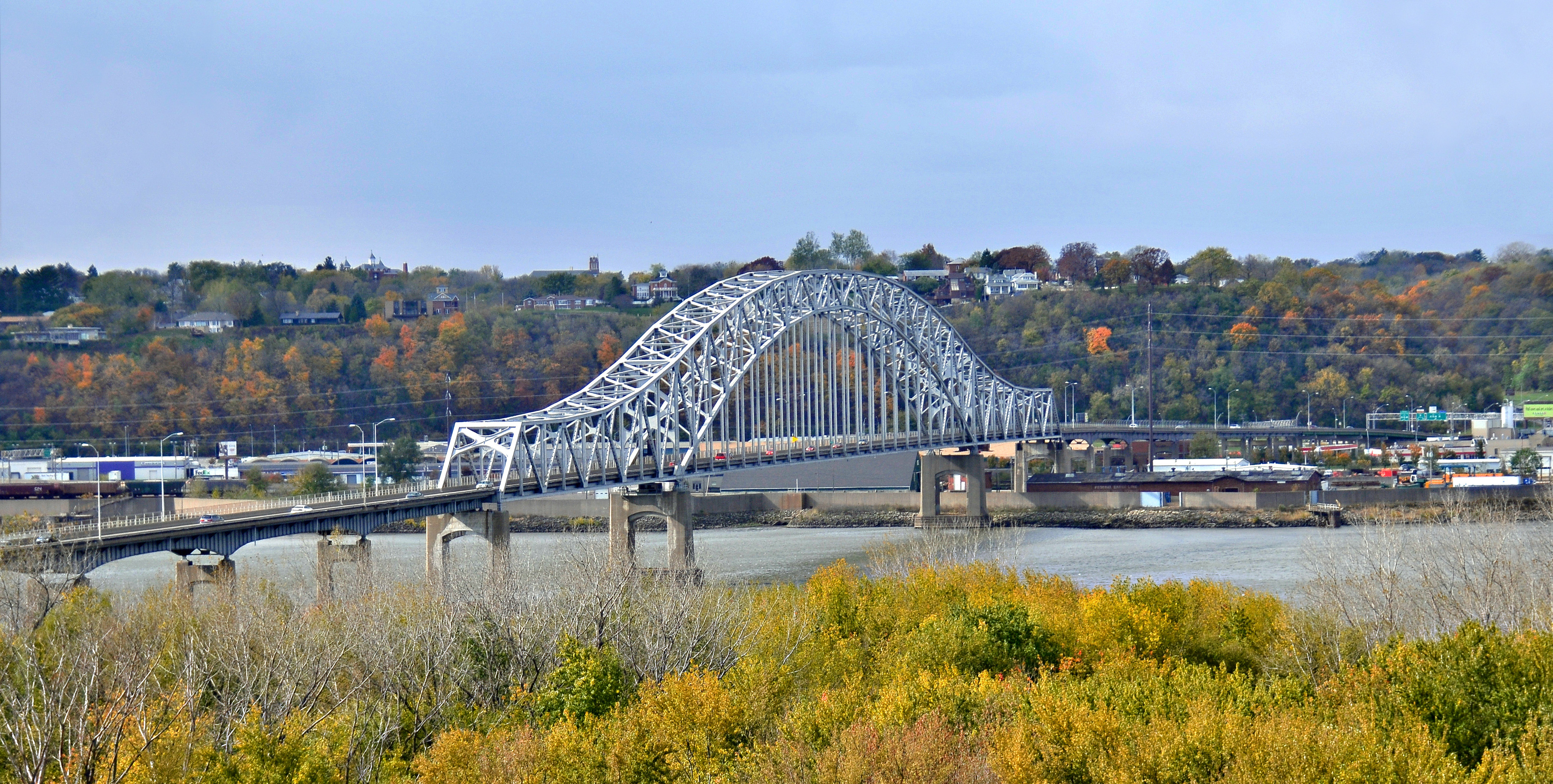
- Julien Dubuque Bridge in October 2008
- Location: US 20, between Dubuque, Iowa, and East Dubuque, Illinois, over the Mississippi River
- Coordinates: 42°29′30″N 90°39′22″W
- Area: 3.8 acres (1.5 ha)
- Built: 1943
- Architectural style: Trussed arch bridge
- NRHP reference No.: 99001034
- Added to NRHP: August 27, 1999

The Julien Dubuque Bridge is a bridge over the Mississippi River that connects Dubuque, Iowa and East Dubuque, Illinois. The bridge is part of U.S. Route 20 (US 20). It is one of two automobile bridges over the Mississippi in the area (the Dubuque–Wisconsin Bridge three miles (4.8 km) north links Dubuque with Wisconsin), and is listed in the National Register of Historic Places.

== Description ==
The Julien Dubuque Bridge is a light grey color. The bridge spans 5,760 feet (1.76 km) and is 28 feet wide. The longest span is 845 feet.

== History ==
For a number of years, people living in the area wanted a bridge to replace the old bridge, which was called either the "High Bridge" or the "Wagon Bridge." However, economic conditions at the time made it difficult to get the financing together to build a new bridge.

During World War II, a new bridge became even more important as it would help facilitate military transportation. In 1942, the first parts of the bridge began construction. In 1943, the bridge was completed. It was painted gray to decrease visibility of the bridge for enemies.

Because the bridge was financed with bonds, it initially operated as a toll bridge. Money from the tolls was used to repay the debts. Large traffic paid the debts 11 years ahead of schedule and the bridge was toll free by 1954.

In the early 1990s, the bridge underwent an extensive renovation. The deck was replaced, and a new walkway was installed. Prior to this renovation, the bridge was dark green; however, it again was painted a light gray that is currently maintained.

Prior to the construction of the Dubuque-Wisconsin Bridge, the Julien Dubuque Bridge also carried US 61 and US 151. This resulted in both of these highways passing a short distance through Jo Daviess County, Illinois, between Dubuque and Wisconsin. Now both highways cross the Mississippi on the Dubuque–Wisconsin Bridge, which directly connects Wisconsin and Iowa, and neither US 61 nor US 151 passes through Illinois.

On June 9, 2008, the bridge was struck by a number of runaway barges shortly after 8 p.m. Fifteen barges—which were loaded with corn, soybeans, and iron ore—struck one of the pillars on the eastern side of the main channel. Unsure of whether the bridge was stable, authorities temporarily closed it until an inspection could be performed. Traffic was rerouted on to the Dubuque–Wisconsin Bridge a few miles to the north.

== See also ==
- List of crossings of the Upper Mississippi River
