= Randall Road =

Highway in Illinois, United States

- Norman Randall Memorial Highway
- Part of: CR 34
- Length: 31.4 mi (50.5 km)
- Location: Crystal Lake, Lake in the Hills, Algonquin, Carpentersville, West Dundee, Sleepy Hollow, Elgin, South Elgin, St. Charles, Geneva, Batavia, North Aurora, and Aurora
- North end: McHenry Avenue in Crystal Lake
- South end: Marseillaise Place in Aurora

Randall Road is a major north-south stroad and county highway in McHenry and Kane County, Illinois. The road is named after Norman Randall, a prominent area landowner in the 1930s. It serves as the western extent of the Fox Valley suburbs in the Chicago metropolitan area. Its southern terminus is in Aurora, Illinois, at Marseillaise Place. Its northern terminus is at a full four-way intersection at McHenry Avenue and James R. Rakow Road in Crystal Lake, Illinois. The road is 31.4 mi (50.5 km) in length.

== Towns served ==
Randall Road runs through sections of the following towns from north to south: Crystal Lake, Lake in the Hills, Algonquin, Carpentersville, West Dundee, Sleepy Hollow, Elgin, South Elgin, St. Charles, Geneva, Batavia, North Aurora, and Aurora.

== Multilane artery ==
The road is four lanes for the majority of its length. The road is six lanes wide in Algonquin for two miles, starting north of Broadsmore Drive, to accommodate traffic generated by the large outdoor malls Algonquin Commons and the Algonquin Galleria and power center Oakridge Court before expanding to eight lanes between Huntington Drive and Commercial Drive in Algonquin and Lake in the Hills. The road was also widened to six lanes in small stretches in Elgin south of I-90 to accommodate traffic generated by Sherman Hospital. Randall Road narrows to two lanes south of Oak Street in North Aurora. A busy north-south artery, traffic counts average between 39,000 and 47,000 vehicles per day in the corridor from South Elgin to Lake in the Hills, between 28,000 and 39,000 vehicles per day in the Crystal Lake area and in the corridor from South Elgin to Batavia, with lighter volumes (12,000 to 17,000 vehicles per day) in the North Aurora and Aurora areas.

Some of Randall Road's more important intersections are with Illinois 31 via Rakow Road in Crystal Lake, Algonquin Road in Algonquin, Huntley Road and Longmeadow Parkway in Carpentersville, Illinois Route 72 in West Dundee, Big Timber Road and U.S. Route 20 in Elgin, McDonald Road/Stearns Road in South Elgin, Illinois Route 64 and Illinois Route 38 in Saint Charles, Fabyan Parkway in Batavia, Orchard Road in North Aurora, and Indian Trail Drive and Galena Boulevard in Aurora. Randall Road has a complete interchange with Interstate 90 in Elgin, but does not have an interchange at Interstate 88. As a result, travelers will usually use Orchard Road to access Interstate 88.

In the late 2010's and early 2020's, a project took place to renovate the portion of it by the intersection of Algonquin Road. This expanded lanes for both roads, and notably, removed pedestrian tunnels in favor for grade-level crosswalks.

== Retail, industrial, and institutional corridor ==
The road is well known for being lined with retailers for nearly its entire length, with shopping centers being most concentrated in three clusters: St. Charles/Geneva/Batavia, South Elgin/Elgin and Algonquin/Lake in the Hills/Carpentersville. Additionally, the large lifestyle centers Algonquin Commons, Algonquin Galleria, and Geneva Commons are all found along the corridor. In Elgin, the area around the I-90/Randall Road interchange is becoming a major employment center, with several million square feet of industrial and office space, as well as three hotels. Development of the Algonquin Corporate Campus, farther north, is also expected to add additional office and industrial buildings. Over time, the Algonquin-Elgin area along Randall Road is expected to become an edge city.

Additionally, Randall Road has developed into a major medical corridor, with three hospitals located along the road, including Advocate Sherman Hospital and Presence St. Joseph Hospital in Elgin and Delnor Hospital in Geneva. Several medical office buildings can be found along the road as well, and Centegra Health System also maintains a strong presence along the corridor. The Randall Road corridor is also home to many educational facilities including Elgin Community College, Aurora University, Crystal Lake South High School, Harry D. Jacobs High School, Larkin High School, St. Charles North High School, Geneva High School, Batavia High School, Illinois Mathematics and Science Academy, Rosary High School, Aurora Central Catholic High School, Aurora Christian High School, and West Aurora High School. Randall Road also features a high concentration of churches and other places of worship, particularly in the Elgin and St. Charles areas, including some megachurches, most notably Harvest Bible Chapel in Elgin and Christ Community Church in St. Charles.

Kane County Fairgrounds and Government Center is prominently placed along the road in the St. Charles/Geneva area. Other points of interest on Randall Road include Randall Oaks Park & Golf Course (the showcase of the Dundee Township Park District), and Lake in the Hills Airport, a general aviation facility located off Rakow Road, the northeastern extension of Randall Road.

== Safety ==
Randall Road remains unique, due to its speed limit and amount of reckless driving. When rural roads are widened and built up, the speed limits are typically lowered. Sections of the road have speed limits of 45 or 50 mph (72 or 80 km/h). Because of the high-speed limit and high traffic volume, Randall Road has a lot of car accidents, many of them fatal. For example, Algonquin reports that at least 50% of traffic accidents within its boundaries occur on Randall Road. In addition, the intersection of Randall and Huntley Roads was the most dangerous intersection in Illinois in 2006, with 90 crashes reported there that year. In 2007, despite signal improvements, the number increased to 101 crashes. The intersection of Randall Road and McHenry Avenue ranked 8th, with 67 crashes.

In July 2006, municipal policing bodies with jurisdictions on Randall Road teamed up together to tackle hazardous driving and improve safety on the road. The program aimed to increase awareness, promote safety, and go after aggressive drivers, speeders, and those who run red lights. In an eight-hour period, more than 400 citations were given up and down the road.

Several municipalities, such as Algonquin and Lake in the Hills, have also begun installing red-light cameras that take photographs of vehicles that run red lights, and then issue the owner a speeding ticket in the mail. This initiative aims to curb reckless driving behaviors, particularly the tendency of high-speed traffic to run red lights, which poses significant danger and also causes delays. Many of these cameras have since been removed.

Pedestrian safety is also an issue, and with the lack of sidewalks and safe crossings, several municipalities are working to create safer crossings. South Elgin has already constructed a pedestrian bridge near Silver Glen Road.

== Major intersections ==
{{ILint

County	Location	mi	km	Destinations	Notes
county=Kane	location=Aurora	mile=ㅤ	road=Virgin Gilman Nature Trail	notes=Road Terminus is Sundown Road, Randall Road continues as a trail.	
Gap in route
Aurora	0.0	0.0	Marseillaise Place	Southern terminus	
North Aurora	4.4	7.1	CR 83 south (Orchard Road) / CR 71 east (Mooseheart Road)	Orchard Road southbound to I-88 Toll	
Batavia–Geneva city line	7.6	12.2	CR 8 (Fabyan Parkway)		
St. Charles	10.2	16.4	IL 38 / Lincoln Highway		
St. Charles	10.9	17.5	IL 64 (Main Street)		
South Elgin	16.0	25.7	CR 37 (Stearns Road/McDonald Road)		
Elgin	19.3	31.1	US 20 (Elgin Bypass)		
Elgin	22.8	36.7	I-90 Toll (Jane Addams Memorial Tollway)		
Dundee Township	24.3	39.1	IL 72 (Higgins Road)		
Algonquin	26.9	43.3	CR 86 (Longmeadow Parkway)		
McHenry	Algonquin–Lake in the Hills city line	29.3	47.2	CR A48 (Algonquin Road) to IL 62	
McHenry	Crystal Lake	31.5	50.7	McHenry Avenue	Northern terminus; road continues as James R. Rakow Road to Illinois Route 31
1.000 mi = 1.609 km; 1.000 km = 0.621 mi: Tolled
