= Orchard Road (Illinois) =

Road in Illinois, United States

- Kane Co. Highway 83, Kendall Co. Highway 20
- Part of: CR 20 / CR 83
- Maintained by: Kane County Department of Transportation, Kendall County Highway Department
- Length: 11.1 mi (17.9 km)
- Location: North Aurora, Aurora, Montgomery, and Oswego
- South end: IL 71 in Oswego
- Major junctions: US 34 in Oswego; US 30 / Lincoln Highway in Montgomery; I-88 Toll / IL 56 Toll / IL 110 (CKC) in Aurora
- North end: CR 34 / Randall Road near North Aurora

Orchard Road is a major north-south road carrying traffic through Kane and Kendall Counties in northeast Illinois. It exists as a county highway in both counties. It runs from Oswego through Aurora to North Aurora, where it connects with Randall Road. Much traffic continues northward on Randall Road to access Batavia, Illinois and points northward in the Fox Valley.

== Route description ==
Having mostly been a 2-lane road until the early 2000s, Orchard Road is now largely a four-lane major road running on the west sides of Aurora, Montgomery, and Oswego, paralleling the Fox River. It is commonly used as a western alternative to Illinois Routes 31 and 25, which run in close proximity to the Fox River. Because Routes 25 and 31 run through downtown Aurora and Oswego, they have lower speed limits and more obstructions to smooth traffic. Orchard Road's speed limit is 45 for most of its length, never dipping below 40, and it has four lanes for most of its length, making Orchard Road the route of choice for many travelers moving north-south through these locales.

=== Kendall County ===
Orchard Road's southern terminus is at an intersection with Illinois Route 71 in Oswego, where the roadway continues south as Minkler Road. From there, Orchard Road runs north to cross the Fox River and shortly afterward, U.S. Route 34. The road continues north past the Caterpillar, Inc. plant in Montgomery to meet U.S. Route 30 at the Kane/Kendall County line. Although Kendall County does not sign its county highways, Orchard Road is designated as Kendall County Highway 20.

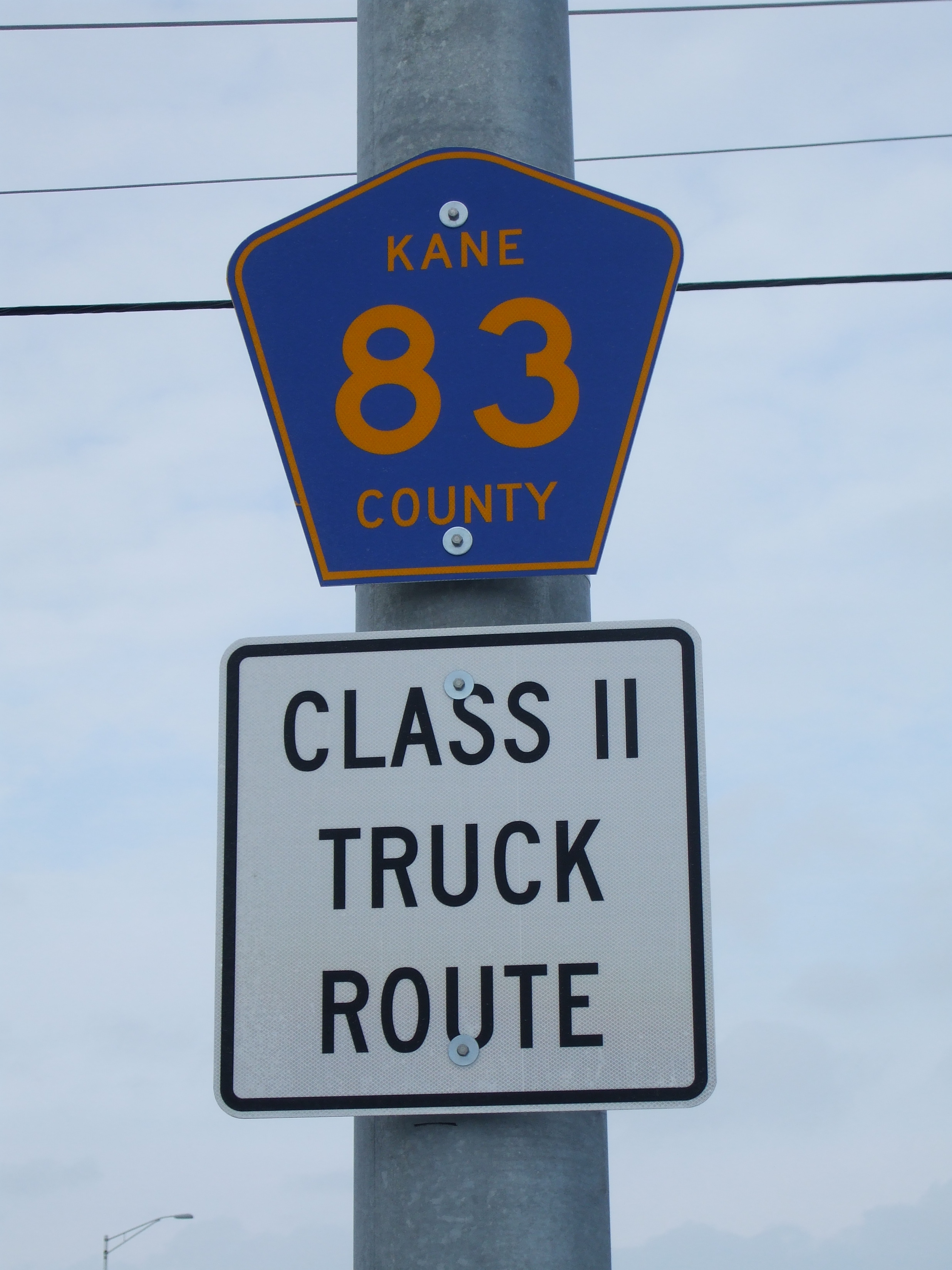
Orchard Road is known in Kane County as Kane County Highway 83.

=== Kane County ===
From U.S. Route 30, Orchard Road continues northbound into the western reaches of Aurora, serving as a main north-south artery alternative to Illinois Route 31 and Illinois Route 25, which are generally slower. It crosses Galena Boulevard, the main east-west access to downtown Aurora. Farther north, it reaches Sullivan Road, which provides access to the Illinois Math and Science Academy. As Orchard Road crosses into North Aurora, it meets a complete interchange with Interstate 88. From there, it begins to curve northeasterly to meet Randall Road; the road continues eastbound as Mooseheart Road, toward Mooseheart and Illinois Route 31. The entire length of Orchard Road within Kane County is designated Kane County Highway 83, and it is signed as such in several locations.

== Impact of urban sprawl ==
As it stands, all of Orchard Road is 4 lanes with the exception of the southern end from the Fox River bridge to Illinois Route 71. As the Orchard Road corridor is being overtaken by urban sprawl from the Chicago area, the need to improve the road is and has been constantly growing. Kendall County was statistically the fastest-growing county in the United States within the time period from 2000 to 2007, with high-magnitude growth occurring in Kane County as well. Though no mention of widening the bottleneck appears in Kane County's 2011 construction plans, Kendall County's long-term plans also call for a widening of the Fox River bridge at the southern end of Orchard Road.

== Recent improvements ==
The need to expand the capacity of Orchard Road has been met with many improvements over the past decade. The first of a wave of new bridges over the Fox River, a crossing at Orchard Road was constructed in 2000 and 2001, linking Routes 34 and 71. Before then, Orchard Road's southern terminus was simply at Route 34. This bridge was useful in allowing for traffic to cross the river without navigating through downtown Oswego or Yorkville.

2001 marked the beginning of a massive reconstruction project oriented on widening a large portion of Orchard Road from just south of Prairie Street north to near Interstate 88. This accompanied a project dealing with the encounter with the Burlington Northern-Santa Fe railroad tracks, converting what was an at-grade intersection to a railroad overpass accompanied by an overpass carrying the adjacent Virgil Gilman Trail, a bike path. This brought the southern end of the 4-lane section in Kane County to just south of the railroad overpass.

A Park and Ride facility was completed in 2004 at the intersection of Orchard Road and Mill Road in Oswego. The site, adjacent to tracks owned by the Burlington Northern-Santa Fe (BNSF) railroad (different from the tracks involved in the grade separation project mentioned above), was originally envisioned as a train station. The proposed station would serve as the new extent of Metra's BNSF commuter rail service from Chicago to Aurora.

A renovation of Orchard Road from Interstate 88 north to Randall Road was completed in 2005. It consisted of road widening and intersection improvement at Oak Street, among other improvements.

In 2007, the 4-lane portion of Orchard Road in Kane County was extended a bit further south with an intersection improvement at Jericho Road. Shortly after in 2008, a signal was constructed at Rochester Drive, an industrial entrance south of Jericho road.

Also in 2007, Kendall County performed the first of its widening projects for Orchard Road. The portion from U.S. Route 30 south to just north of the BNSF railroad overpass near the new Park-and-Ride was upgraded to 4 lanes.

In spring and summer 2009, construction was carried out to widen Orchard Road from the railroad overpass in Oswego south to just short of the Fox River bridge. Even so, local officials found the work to be long overdue. From that railroad overpass southward to just beyond U.S. Route 34, the 4-lane trend was extended with a widening of that section a year later.

== Future plans ==
In fall 2010, Kane County was awarded $2.6 million for constructing three new bike paths, one of which is to follow along Orchard Road from U.S. Route 30 to Jericho Road. This will provide a safe pedestrian connection from the Virgil Gilman Trail to Montgomery businesses.

In 2011, Kane County intends to create plans for a rehabilitation of the overpass carrying Orchard Road over Interstate 88, specifically, a replacement of the bridge deck. Also, at some point during the year, Kendall County intents to implement a feasibility study of a potential east-west connection between Illinois 71, Minkler Road, and Grove Road. The Minkler Road connection would occur just south of the Orchard Road-Illinois 71 intersection. This may create an easy connection from Orchard Road to Grove Road southbound without maneuvering through inner Oswego.

As Kendall County annually drafts a 20-year highway plan, several items pertaining to Orchard Road continue to appear on the list, the most notable being the widening of the bridge over the Fox River, which was completed only recently in 2000. This improvement, having been cited repeatedly in the long-term plans, will extend from the southern extent of the 4-lane section south to the Illinois 71 intersection. Other Orchard Road-related items on the list are as follows.

- Improvement of the intersection at Illinois 71
- Improvement of the intersection at Tuscany Trail where Oswego meets Montgomery
- Improvement of the intersection at Galena Road
- Improvement of the intersection at U.S. Route 30, involving dual left turn lanes

Kane County, in their 2030 highway plan, gives mention of planning to widen the region near the I-88 interchange, from Randall Road to Indian Trail Road, to six lanes.

== Major intersections ==
| County | Location | mi | km | Destinations | Notes |
|---|---|---|---|---|---|
| Kendall | Oswego | 0.0 | 0.0 | IL 71 | Southern terminus, road continues as Minkler Road |
| Kendall | Oswego | 0.7 | 1.1 | US 34 (Veterans Parkway) | |
| Kendall | Montgomery | 2.8 | 4.5 | CR 9 west (Galena Road) | Eastern terminus of CR 9 |
| Kendall–Kane county line | Montgomery | 3.6 | 5.8 | US 30 (Base Line Road) / Lincoln Highway | |
| Kane | Aurora | 5.2 | 8.4 | CR 24 west (Jericho Road) | Eastern terminus of CR 24 |
| Kane | Aurora | 8.5 | 13.7 | I-88 Toll / IL 56 Toll / IL 110 (CKC) – DeKalb, Chicago | I-88/IL 56/IL 110 exit 114 |
| Kane | North Aurora | 9.7 | 15.6 | CR 15 west (Tanner Road) | Eastern terminus of CR 15, only accessible via southbound Orchard Road |
| Kane | North Aurora | 11.1 | 17.9 | CR 34 north (Randall Road) / CR 71 east (Mooseheart Road) | Northern terminus, road continues as Mooseheart Road (CR 71) |
1.000 mi = 1.609 km; 1.000 km = 0.621 mi: Incomplete access; Tolled
