= Longmeadow Parkway =

Bypass of Algonquin, Illinois

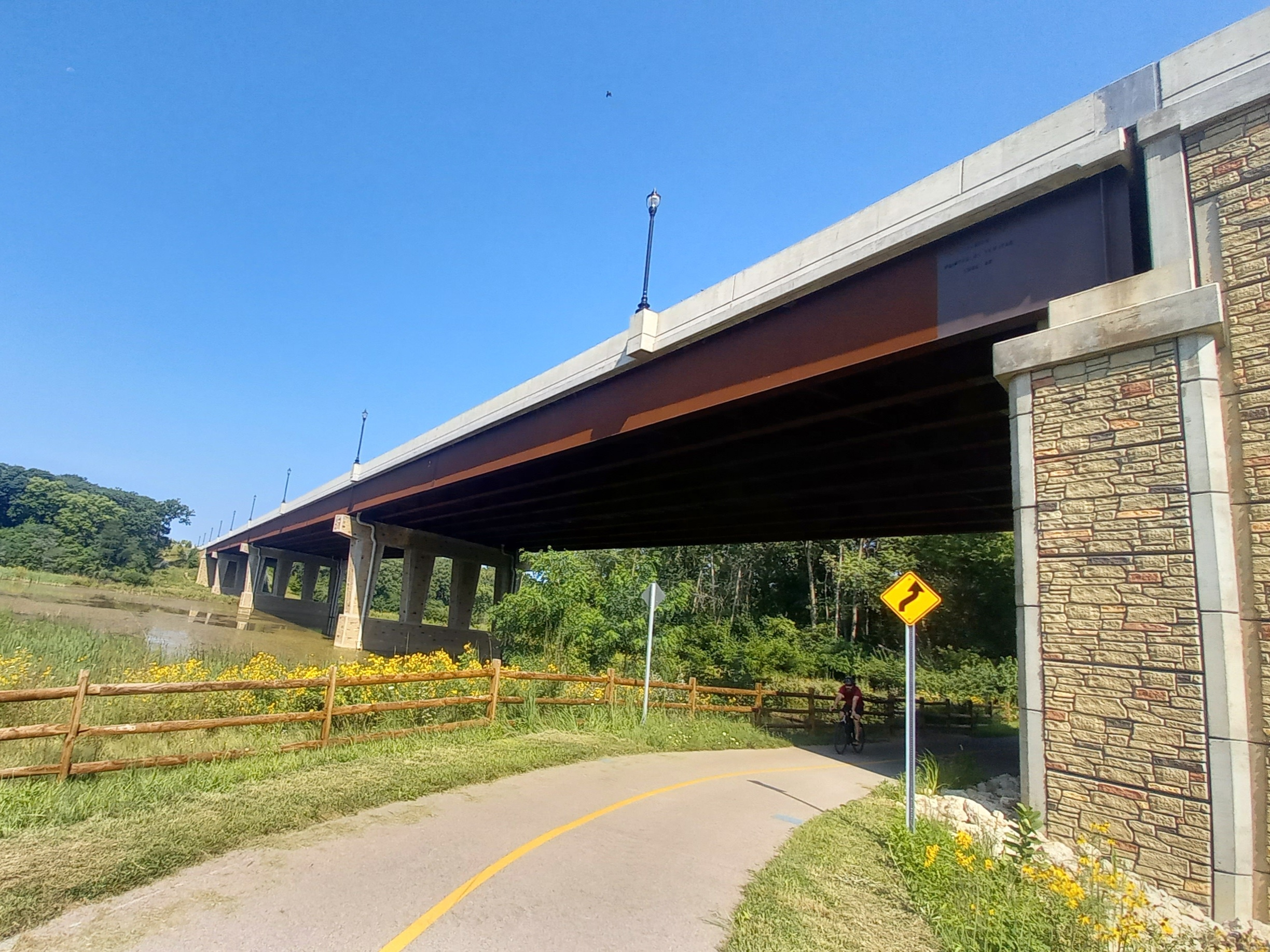
- Longmeadow Parkway bridge crossing over the Fox River Trail
- Longmeadow Parkway highlighted in red
- Part of: CR 86
- Type: Bypass of Algonquin
- Maintained by: Kane County Division of Transportation
- Length: 5.6 mi (9.0 km)
- Width: Four lanes
- Location: Kane County, Illinois
- West end: CR 30 / Huntley Road / Boyer Road in Dundee Township
- Major junctions: IL 31 in Dundee Township; IL 25 in Dundee Township
- East end: IL 62 in Barrington

Construction
- Construction start: Early 2016
- Completion: Late July, 2024 August 29, 2024 (opening and ribbon cutting)

The Longmeadow Parkway is a bypass of Algonquin, Illinois. It is a four-lane Fox River Bridge crossing and four-lane arterial roadway corridor with a median, approximately 5.6 miles (9.0 km) in length, to alleviate traffic congestion in northern Kane County and southern McHenry County in the broader Algonquin area or Algonquin and Dundee Townships. With the project costing $204 million, the parkway opened on August 29, 2024.

== Route description ==
The road passes through portions of the villages of Algonquin, Carpentersville and Barrington Hills, as well as unincorporated areas of Kane County. The western terminus is at Huntley Road west of Randall Road, approximately 1,300 feet (400 m) northwest of the Huntley–Boyer intersection. From Huntley Road to the Fox River, the corridor primarily traverses mostly undeveloped properties or new subdivisions; these subdivisions were developed with a dedicated right-of-way to accommodate the proposed corridor. After crossing the river, the corridor parallels existing Bolz Road, to the eastern terminus at IL 62.

The land between IL 31 and the Fox River is currently a farm. The planning process and funding of the Longmeadow Parkway made possible the preservation of this open land as the Brunner Family Forest Preserve. The Parkway bisects the Preserve with a pedestrian overpass linking the two sections.

== History ==
Until the 1950s all bridges crossing the Fox River in Kane County were located on the main streets of the towns along the river. Starting with Interstate 90 (I-90) in 1958 and the Elgin Bypass in 1962, planners have added additional bridges between the historic towns. Later the Fabyan Parkway bridge between Geneva and Batavia was added. In 1990, a Congressional earmark funded the Fox River Study to identified additional bypass routes to relieve congestion created by additional population west of the Fox River. One of the recommended routes was the Longmeadow Parkway. This corridor would connect two parallel routes that traveled in a northwest–southeast direction. Huntley Road crossed the Fox River on a two lane bridge in downtown Carpentersville, and Illinois Route 62 (IL 62) crossed the Fox River in downtown Algonquin. Congestion on each bridge was increased by nearby a traffic light with IL 31. To relieve congestion in Algonquin, IL 31 was moved further west away from the river. The Western Algonquin Bypass opened to traffic in September 2014. The bypass has a diamond interchange with Algonquin Road. The bypass removes through traffic from Main Street at the intersection of Main Street and Algonquin Road. (IL 62) in downtown Algonquin. However, traffic planners continued to press for the Longmeadow Parkway as a means for relieving traffic in both Carpentersville and Algonquin as well as enhance travel to Huntley.

The project was earmarked $4 million in federal SAFETEA-LU funds, $15.4 million in federal Surface Transportation Program funds, $2.1 million in federal Congestion Mitigation and Air Quality funds, nearly $1 million in state of Illinois Truck Access Route Program funds, and an additional $45.2 million commitment from the state of Illinois. The current estimated total cost of the project is $160 million. With limited options to address the funding shortfall, eleven local governments in the Upper Fox Valley region passed resolutions requesting that Kane County consider funding the bridge through a user fee (toll funding). Based upon this request, the Kane County Board agreed to establish a Longmeadow Parkway Toll Bridge Task Force.

In 2015 and 2016 various lawsuits were filed in an effort to halt construction based upon environmental concerns.

In response to traffic projections on the eastern terminus of the parkway, the Illinois Department of Transportation is conducting a study that is considering upgrading IL-62 to a divided four-lane road eastward to IL-59.

The project experienced many delays including discussion of an endangered bee habitat nearby, COVID-19 pandemic supply shortages, and the discovery and removal of lead in the soil from an old shooting range in the Parkway's right-of-way. The parkway opened on August 29, 2024 with a ribbon-cutting ceremony including local officials and Illinois Governor J. B. Pritzker in attendance.

=== Formerly proposed tolling ===
To fill a gap in funding, in November 2018, Kane County issued $27.8 million in bonds supported by tolls from the bridge. In September 2018, Kane County and the Illinois Tollway entered into an agreement to install all-electronic I-Pass tolling for the bridge. The toll plaza was planned to be located on the eastern end of the bridge, and was projected to cost $1.1 million. All portions of the parkway other than the bridge was to be toll-free, and no federal funds are being used to construct the toll bridge portion of the project.

Consultants studies justified a $0.75 to $0.95 toll for a one-way trip in an automobile.

In January 2024, it was announced that the entire parkway will be toll-free as there was enough money allocated to eliminate the need for a toll. Signs related to the now-canceled tolling were removed on May 1, 2024.

== Major intersections ==
The entire route is in Kane County.

Location	mi	km	Destinations	Notes
Dundee Township	0.0	0.0	CR 30 (Huntley Road) / Boyer Road	Western terminus
Algonquin	0.5	0.80	CR 34 (Randall Road)	
Algonquin	1.3	2.1	Sleepy Hollow Road	
Dundee Township	2.4	3.9	IL 31 (Western Avenue)	One-quadrant interchange
Dundee Township			Bridge	
Carpentersville			TO Bolz Road	
Carpentersville			IL 25 (Kennedy Drive)	
Barrington Hills			IL 62 (Algonquin Road)	Eastern terminus
1.000 mi = 1.609 km; 1.000 km = 0.621 mi
