= Illinois Route 56 =

East-west state highway in Illinois, US

Illinois Route 56
- Butterfield Road; Bill Hewitt Memorial Highway
- IL 56 highlighted in red

Route information
- Maintained by IDOT and ISTHA
- Length: 32.52 mi (52.34 km)
- Existed: 1924–present

Major junctions
- West end: US 30 / IL 47 in Sugar Grove
- I-88 Toll / IL 110 (CKC) in Sugar Grove I-88 Toll / IL 31 / IL 110 (CKC) in North Aurora I-355 Toll in Downers Grove
- East end: US 12 / US 20 / US 45 in Bellwood

Location
- Country: United States
- State: Illinois
- Counties: Kane, DuPage, Cook

Highway system
- Illinois State Highway System; Interstate; US; State; Tollways; Scenic
← IL 55	→ I-57
← I-55	IL 55	→ IL 56

Illinois Route 56 (IL 56) is a 32.52-mile-long (52.34 km) east–west state highway in northern and northeastern Illinois. It runs from the interchange of Illinois Route 47 at U.S. Route 30 (US 30) in Sugar Grove east to US 12/US 20/US 45 (Mannheim Road) by Bellwood. It is one of only three state highways (the other being IL 110 and IL 390) that require tolls.

== Route description ==
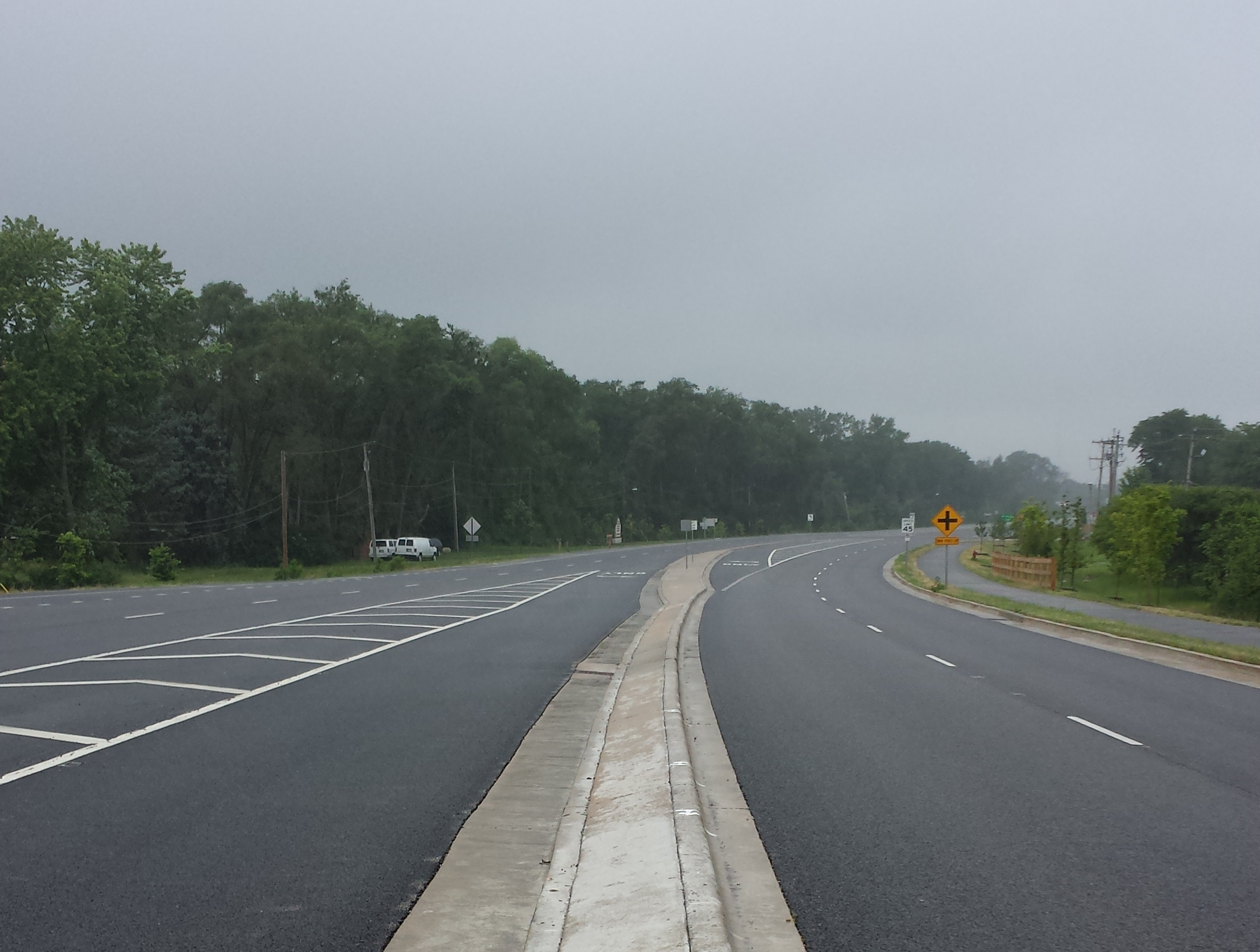
A section of IL 56 in Warrenville facing west toward the intersection with Route 59

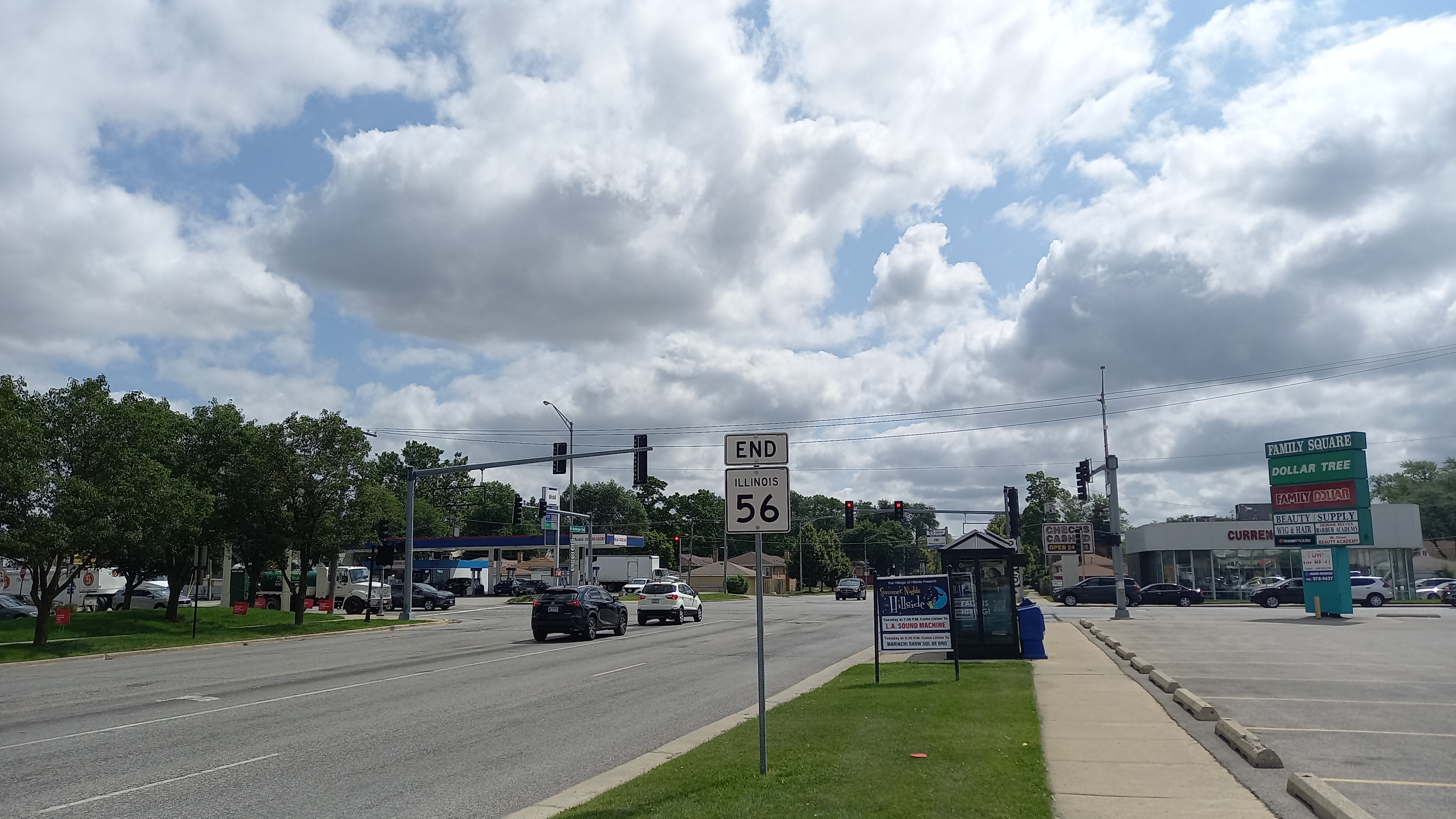
IL 56 ends at US 12/US 20/US 45

IL 56 begins at a partial cloverleaf interchange with US 30/IL 47 in Sugar Grove, located east of the Aurora Municipal Airport. While US 30 exits the road to travel south toward Montgomery, the road continues as IL 56. The road becomes a free limited-access road for the next 4 miles (6.4 km). IL 56 then meets Galena Boulevard at another partial cloverleaf interchange, which directly connects to Aurora and its downtown area. With the exception of the Golf View Road junction for westbound traffic, this interchange is the only intermediate exit between US 30/IL 47 and I-88. Traveling eastbound, IL 56 merges with I-88 just west of Orchard Road and continues along the tollway until intersecting with IL 31. The route travels north along IL 31 until turning east along State Street in North Aurora. The route then crosses over the Fox River before traveling along a sharp S-curve.

IL 56 travels along Butterfield Road in an east-northeast direction beyond IL 25, paralleling I-88. Butterfield Road serves as a major arterial road within the Illinois Technology and Research Corridor. Between the Batavia Spur of the Illinois Prairie Path and the Elgin, Joliet and Eastern Railway overpass, IL 56 serves as the southern border for Fermilab. Beyond the EJ&E Railway overpass, the road becomes a divided highway. IL 56 then parallels the Aurora branch of the Illinois Prairie Path between IL 59 and St. James Farm. IL 56 goes through commercial and industrial developments beyond I-355 in Downers Grove, such as Yorktown Center in Lombard. In Oak Brook, IL 56 exits off the mainline to continue along Butterfield Road; traffic continuing straight would end up on 22nd Street. IL 56 then meets IL 83 and IL 38 at a series of interchanges north of the Oakbrook Center. The surrounding commercial development wanes as IL 56 goes through residential areas in Elmhurst, Hillside, and Bellwood. In Bellwood, IL 56 leaves Butterfield Road and briefly travels east along Washington Boulevard before ending at US 12/US 20/US 45 (Mannheim Road).

== History ==
SBI Route 56 was the current IL 56 from Oak Brook to Bellwood on Butterfield Road. IL 56 originally traveled from US 330/IL 6 (now IL 38) in Oak Brook to US 45/IL 46 (now US 12/US 20/US 45) in Bellwood. It was then extended to US 20/IL 43 in 1934 in Oak Park. In 1942, IL 56 was extended southwest to IL 55 (22nd Street).

In 1972, the eastern end was truncated to its current location.

=== Illinois Route 55 ===
Illinois Route 55
- Location: Sugar Grove–Chicago
- Existed: 1924–1965

IL 55 originally ran from IL 54 (now IL 83) in Oak Brook to Michigan Avenue in Chicago via Cermak Road, Ogden Avenue, and 12th Street. IL 55 was removed east of Ogden Avenue in 1934. In 1940, IL 55 was extended west along 22nd Street and Butterfield Road to IL 53. By 1953, IL 55 was extended further west to IL 25 in North Aurora. With the opening of the East-West Tollway in 1958, IL 55 was extended west along IL 31 and the newly-built tollway to US 30/IL 47 in Sugar Grove.

On April 2, 1965, the Illinois State Division of Highways announced that IL 56 would replace IL 55 west of 22nd Street, which was duplicated by the designation of Interstate 55 in DuPage and Cook counties. The rest of IL 55 along Cermak Road was removed.

== Major intersections ==
County	Location	mi	km	Destinations	Notes
Kane	Sugar Grove	0.0	0.0	US 30 west – Hinckley US 30 east / IL 47 to I-88 Toll west – Elburn, Sugar Grove	Western terminus; interchange
Kane	Sugar Grove	1.5	2.4	Galena Boulevard	Interchange
Kane	Aurora	3.9	6.3	I-88 Toll west / IL 110 (CKC) west (Ronald Reagan Memorial Tollway) – DeKalb	West end of I-88/IL 110 overlap; westbound exit and eastbound exit; I-88 exit 113
Kane	Aurora–North Aurora city line	4.7	7.6	CR 83 (Orchard Road)	Toll on eastbound exit westbound entrance; Exit 114 in both directions; was Exit 115
Kane	North Aurora	7.4	11.9	I-88 Toll east / IL 110 (CKC) east (Ronald Reagan Memorial Tollway) – Chicago IL 31 south (Lincolnway Street) / Lincoln Highway east	East end of I-88/IL 110 overlap; West end of IL 31/Lincoln Highway overlap; I-88 exit 117
Kane	North Aurora	8.3	13.4	IL 31 north / Lincoln Highway west (Lincolnway Street)	East end of IL 31/Lincoln Highway overlap
Kane	North Aurora	8.6	13.8	IL 25 (River Street)	
Kane	Aurora	10.8	17.4	CR 77 north (Kirk Road, Farnsworth Avenue)	Southern terminus of CR 77/Kirk Road; Northern terminus of Farnsworth Avenue
DuPage	Aurora	13.3	21.4	CR 14 south (Eola Road)	Northern terminus of CR 14/Eola Road
DuPage	Warrenville	14.8	23.8	IL 59	
DuPage	Warrenville	16.8	27.0	CR 13 (Winfield Road)	
DuPage	Wheaton–Warrenville– Milton Township tripoint	17.9	28.8	CR 51 south (Herrick Road)	
DuPage	Wheaton	20.0	32.2	CR 23 (Naperville Road)	
DuPage	Glen Ellyn	22.0	35.4	CR 5 (Park Boulevard)	
DuPage	Glen Ellyn	22.7	36.5	IL 53 (Bryant Avenue)	
DuPage	Downers Grove	24.0	38.6	I-355 Toll (Veteran's Memorial Tollway) – Joliet, Northwest Suburbs	I-355 exit 22
DuPage	Downers Grove–Lombard line	25.0	40.2	CR 9 south (Highland Avenue)	Interchange; northern terminus of CR 9
DuPage	Oak Brook–Lombard line	26.2	42.2	CR 25 (Meyers Road)	
DuPage	Oakbrook Terrace	27.0	43.5	CR 15 (Midwest Road (north) Summit Avenue (south))	
DuPage	Oakbrook Terrace	28.1	45.2	IL 83 (Kingery Highway)	Interchange; westbound access to access to IL 83 via IL 38 west; no westbound entrance from IL 83 north; no eastbound access to IL 83 south
DuPage	Oakbrook Terrace–Elmhurst line	28.4	45.7	IL 38 (Roosevelt Road)	Interchange; eastbound access to IL 38 via IL 83 north; no westbound access to IL 38 east
Cook	Hillside	31.47	50.65	CR W22 (Wolf Road)	
Cook	Bellwood	32.52	52.34	US 12 / US 20 / US 45 (Mannheim Road)	Eastern terminus
1.000 mi = 1.609 km; 1.000 km = 0.621 mi: Concurrency terminus; Incomplete access

== See also ==
- Cermak Road
