= Illinois Route 83 =

State highway in northeastern Illinois, US

Illinois Route 83
- IL 83 highlighted in red

Route information
- Maintained by IDOT
- Length: 91.73 mi (147.63 km)
- Existed: 1941–present

Major junctions
- South end: US 30 in Lynwood
- I-80 / I-94 / US 6 in Lansing; US 6 in Calumet City; I-94 in Dolton; I-57 in Posen; I-294 Toll in Alsip; US 45 in Palos Hills; I-55 in Willowbrook; I-88 Toll / IL 110 (CKC) in Oakbrook Terrace; I-290 in Addison; IL 390 Toll in Bensenville
- North end: WIS 83 in Antioch

Location
- Country: United States
- State: Illinois
- Counties: Cook, DuPage, Lake

Highway system
- Illinois State Highway System; Interstate; US; State; Tollways; Scenic
← IL 82	→ IL 84
← US 52	IL 52	→ IL 53

Illinois Route 83 (IL 83) is a 91.73-mile-long (147.63 km) major north–south state highway in northeast Illinois. It stretches from U.S. Route 30 (US 30, Lincoln Highway) by Lynwood and Dyer, Indiana, north to the Wisconsin border by Antioch at Wisconsin Highway 83 (WIS 83).

== Route description ==
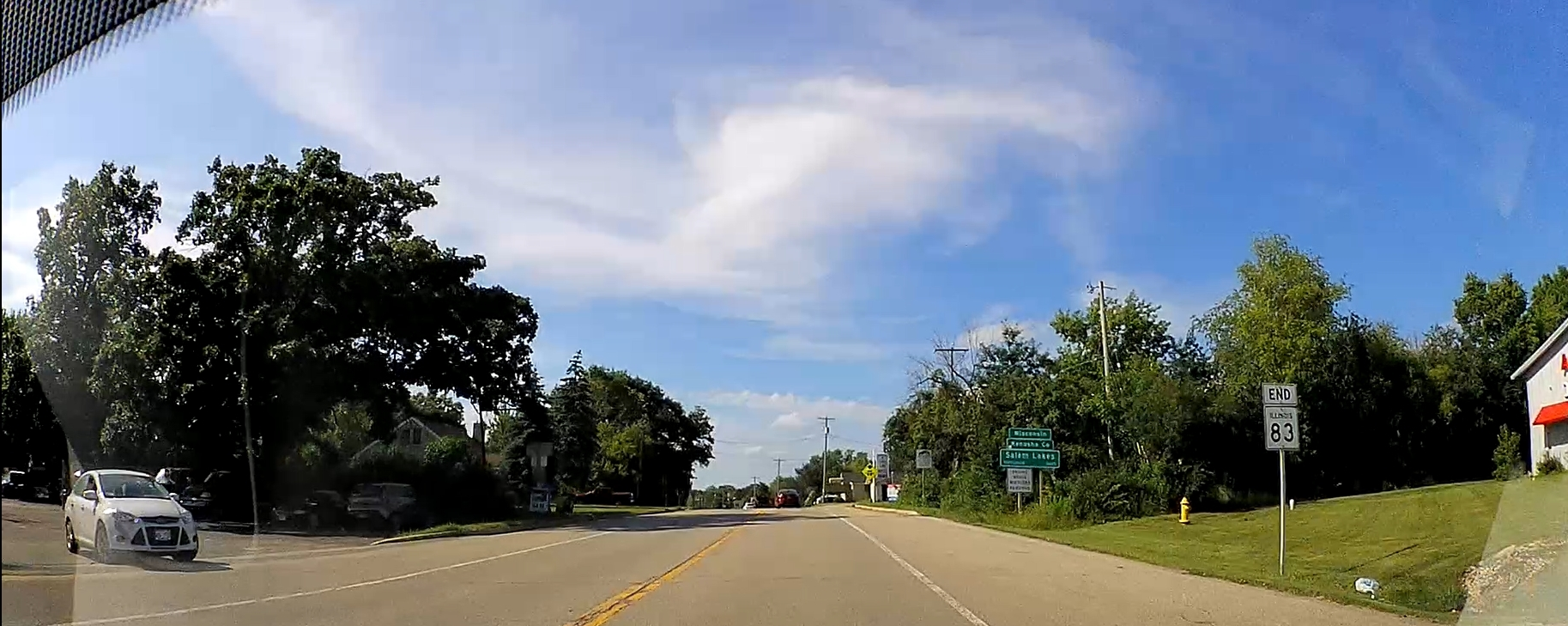
IL 83's northern terminus at the Wisconsin state line

IL 83 passes through Cook County, DuPage County, and Lake County. It begins as part of Glenwood–Dyer Road in Lynwood, and then follows Torrence Avenue though Lansing, 147th Street/Sibley Boulevard though Calumet City, Dolton, Harvey, Dixmoor, Posen, and Midlothian, then north on Cicero, and then northwest on Cal Sag Road through Crestwood, Palos Heights, Palos Park, and Lemont in Cook County. Entering DuPage County, it becomes known as the Kingery Highway. It then follows Busse Road, Oakton Street and Elmhurst Road in northern Cook County. In Lake County it is named McHenry Road in Buffalo Grove, Ivanhoe Road north of Mundelein, Barron Boulevard in Grayslake and Milwaukee Avenue in Lake Villa. IL 83 ranges from a width of two thru lanes at either terminus to six lanes through DuPage County. It is the main north–south arterial route falling between Interstate 355 (I-355) and I-294 for the central portion of its routing.

== History ==
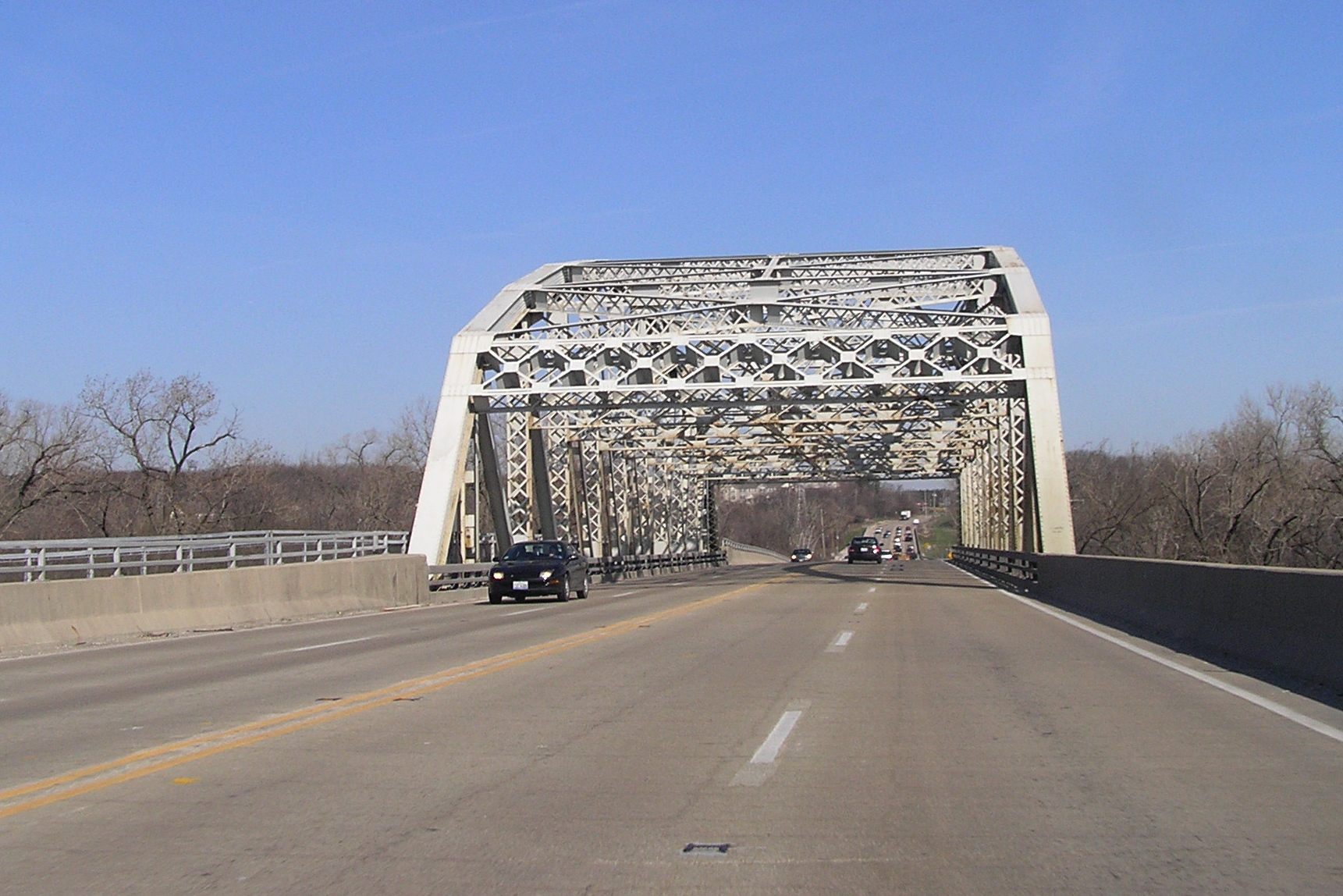
IL 83 bridge over the Ship and Sanitary Canal

SBI Route 83 was modern Illinois Route 17 from New Boston to Galva. In 1941 it was changed to the Lynwood-to-Antioch routing, replacing Illinois Route 52 and IL 54. In 1998, IL 83 was routed slightly north onto 127th Street, from Cal Sag Road. The renumbering was part of a major reconstruction project of the IL 50 intersection with I-294 (Tri-State Tollway).

As part of sign replacement accompanying the renumbering, IL 83 was added to the northbound IL 50 exit from southbound I-294, as the new northbound IL 50 ramp leads directly to IL 83 first. However, IL 83 overlaps IL 50 southbound at the center of the interchange, so southbound IL 50 traffic also joins IL 83 at the end of the ramp. This is not reflected in the current signage on the tollway.

A $13.4 million construction project was completed in northern Lake County on a four-mile (6.4 km) section of IL 83 from Petite Lake Road to the Wisconsin state line. Changes included adding a center turn lane and intersection reconfigurations at Grass Lake Road, IL 173, and North Avenue. The project was completed in fall 2010.

== Major intersections ==
County	Location	mi	km	Destinations	Notes
Cook	Lynwood	0.0	0.0	US 30 / Lincoln Highway	Southern terminus of IL 83
Cook	Lansing	5.5	8.9	I-80 / I-94 / US 6 east (Kingery Expressway) to I-294 / IL 394 – Iowa, Indiana	Southern end of US 6 concurrency; I-80 exit 161
Cook	Calumet City	7.1	11.4	US 6 west (162nd Street, River Oaks Drive)	Northern end of US 6 concurrency
Cook	Dolton	9.7	15.6	I-94 (Bishop Ford Freeway) – Chicago, Indiana	I-94 exit 71
Cook	Harvey	12.9	20.8	IL 1 (Halsted Street)	
Cook	Posen	14.9	24.0	I-57 – Chicago, Memphis	I-57 exit 350
Cook	Posen	15.5	24.9	I-294 Toll north (Tri-State Tollway) – West Suburbs, Indiana	I-Pass only; no access to I-294 south or from I-294 north; I-294 exit 8
Cook	Midlothian	17.9	28.8	IL 50 south (Cicero Avenue)	Southern end of IL 50 concurrency
Cook	Alsip	20.5	33.0	IL 50 north (Cicero Avenue) to I-294 Toll	Northern end of IL 50 concurrency
Cook	Palos Heights	23.7	38.1	IL 43 (Harlem Avenue)	
Cook	Palos Heights	24.7	39.8	IL 7 (Southwest Highway) / CR W32 south (80th Avenue)	
Cook	Palos Township	26.9	43.3	US 45 (La Grange Road, 96th Avenue)	Interchange
Cook	Sag Bridge	30.9	49.7	IL 171 south (Archer Avenue)	Southern end of IL 171 concurrency
Cook	Sag Bridge	31.7	51.0	IL 171 north (Archer Avenue)	Northern end of IL 171 concurrency
DuPage	Willowbrook–Burr Ridge line	34.8	56.0	I-55 / Historic US 66 – Chicago, Joliet	I-55 exit 274
DuPage	Clarendon Hills–Hinsdale line	38.1	61.3	CR 35 (55th Street)	Interchange
DuPage	Hinsdale–Westmont– Clarendon Hills tripoint	39.6	63.7	US 34 (Ogden Avenue / Walter Payton Memorial Highway)	Interchange
DuPage	Oak Brook	41.2	66.3	CR 34 (31st Street / Oak Brook Road)	Interchange
DuPage	Oak Brook	42.1	67.8	I-88 Toll east / IL 110 (CKC) east (Ronald Reagan Memorial Tollway) – Chicago	Access to I-88/IL 110 west via 22nd Street; I-88 exit 137
DuPage	Oakbrook Terrace	42.9	69.0	IL 56 (Butterfield Road)	Interchange
DuPage	Oakbrook Terrace–Elmhurst city line	43.2	69.5	IL 38 (Roosevelt Road)	Interchange
DuPage	Elmhurst	46.3	74.5	IL 64 (North Avenue)	
DuPage	Addison–Elmhurst village line	47.6	76.6	US 20 (Lake Street) / CR 20 east (Grand Avenue)	Interchange
DuPage	Addison–Elmhurst village line	47.8	76.9	I-290 – Chicago, Rockford	I-290 exit 10
DuPage	Bensenville	50.2	80.8	IL 19 (Irving Park Road)	
DuPage	Bensenville	51.7	83.2	IL 390 Toll west (Elgin O'Hare Tollway)	I-Pass only; current eastern terminus of IL 390
Cook	Elk Grove Village	54.5	87.7	IL 72 west (Oakton Street, Higgins Road)	Western end of IL 72 concurrency
Cook	Elk Grove Village	54.5	87.7	IL 72 east (Higgins Road)	Eastern end of IL 72 concurrency
Cook	Mount Prospect	56.0	90.1	IL 62 west (Algonquin Road)	Eastern terminus of IL 62
Cook	Mount Prospect	57.2	92.1	IL 58 (Golf Road)	
Cook	Mount Prospect	58.4	94.0	US 14 (Northwest Highway, Ronald Reagan Highway)	
Cook	Mount Prospect	59.7	96.1	US 12 (Rand Road)	
Cook	Wheeling	63.7	102.5	IL 68 (Dundee Road)	
Lake	Long Grove	67.7	109.0	IL 53 south	Northern terminus of IL 53
Lake	Long Grove	69.2	111.4	IL 22 (Half Day Road)	
Lake	Mundelein	71.9	115.7	US 45	
Lake	Mundelein	72.3	116.4	IL 60 east (Town Line Road)	Southern end of IL 60 concurrency
Lake	Mundelein	75.7	121.8	IL 176	
Lake	Mundelein	75.8	122.0	IL 60 west	Northern end of IL 60 concurrency
Lake	Grayslake	79.7	128.3	IL 137 east (Buckley Road)	Western terminus of IL 137
Lake	Grayslake	80.0	128.7	IL 120 (Belvidere Road)	
Lake	Lake Villa	86.3	138.9	IL 132 (Grand Avenue)	
Lake	Antioch	90.4	145.5	IL 173	
Lake	Antioch	92.22	148.41	WIS 83 north	Wisconsin state line
1.000 mi = 1.609 km; 1.000 km = 0.621 mi: Concurrency terminus; Electronic toll collection; Incomplete access
