= Illinois Route 25 =

State highway in northeastern Illinois, US

Illinois Route 25
- IL 25 highlighted in red

Route information
- Maintained by IDOT
- Length: 35.04 mi (56.39 km) Note: Some segments of IL 25 may be counted twice due to dual markings on one-way streets through municipalities.
- Existed: 1935–present

Major junctions
- South end: US 34 in Oswego
- US 20 in Elgin I-90 Toll in Elgin
- North end: IL 62 in Carpentersville

Location
- Country: United States
- State: Illinois
- Counties: Kendall, Kane, Cook

Highway system
- Illinois State Highway System; Interstate; US; State; Tollways; Scenic
← IL 24	→ IL 26

Illinois Route 25 (IL 25) is a state route in northeast Illinois. It runs north from U.S. Route 34 in Oswego to Illinois Route 62 (Algonquin Road) in Algonquin. Illinois 25 is 35.04 miles (56.39 km) in length.

== Route description ==
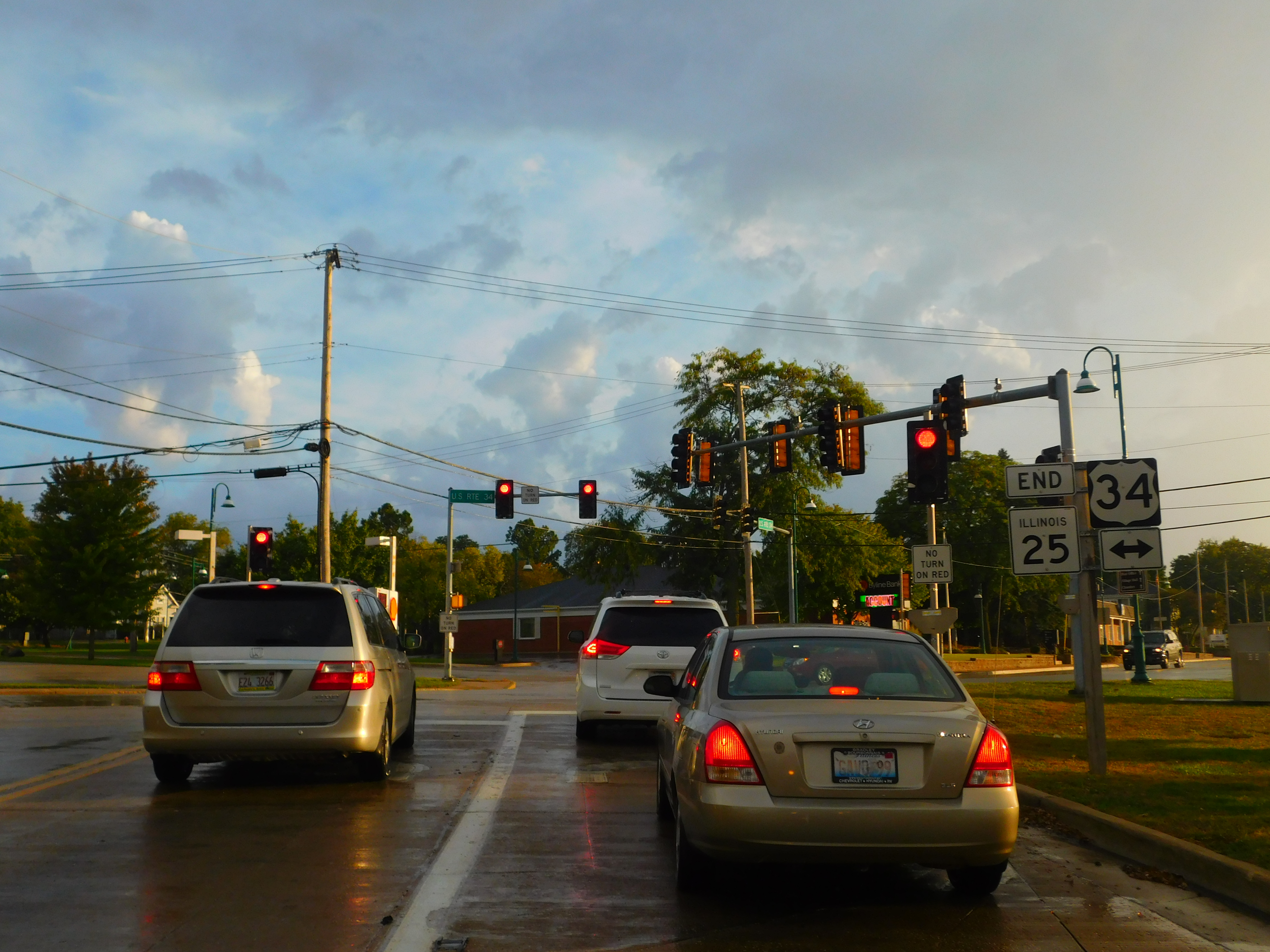
Southern terminus of IL 25 at the junction with US 34 in Oswego

Illinois Route 25 was opened in August 1929; it originally ran from Elgin to East Dundee. It was extended southward to St. Charles in 1930. The entirety of this road follows part of the Fox River on its eastern bank. Illinois Route 31 parallels Route 25 (and the river) on the western bank of the river.

Route 25's southern terminus is in Oswego. It moves northward into Montgomery, where U.S. Highway 30 passes over, but does not have an interchange with it. Route 25 then passes through downtown Aurora. It then winds through North Aurora and Batavia, lacking an interchange with Interstate 88. Route 25 intersects Illinois Route 56 in North Aurora, Illinois Route 38 in Geneva, and Illinois Route 64 in St. Charles.

Route 25 continues northward through South Elgin and into Elgin, intersecting with U.S. Highway 20, and forming the western terminus of both Illinois Route 19 and Illinois Route 58 there.

North of Elgin, Route 25 intersects Interstate 90 and continues into East Dundee, crossing State Routes 72, the main east–west route through the Dundee area, and 68 near its western end. After this, the road passes through Carpentersville, and finally ends at Illinois Route 62 in Algonquin. Route 25 is also known as J.F. Kennedy Memorial Drive within Carpentersville's boundaries.

== History ==
SBI Route 25 was originally what is now U.S. Route 45 from Fairfield north to Kankakee. In 1935, IL 25 moved entirely from US 45 to its current routing.

== Major intersections ==
IDOT has surveyed the route from north to south. Mileposts are given in distances from southern terminus, while mileage under county names reflects IDOT surveying.

County	Location	mi	km	Destinations	Notes
Kane	Algonquin	0.0	0.0	IL 62 (Algonquin Road)	Northern terminus
Kane	East Dundee	3.2	5.1	IL 68 (Barrington Avenue)	
Kane	East Dundee	4.0	6.4	IL 72 (Higgins Road/Main Street)	
Kane–Cook county line	Elgin	6.0	9.7	I-90 Toll (Jane Addams Memorial Tollway) – Chicago, Rockford	I-90 exit 56
Kane	Elgin	7.4	11.9	IL 58 east (Summit Street/Evanston-Elgin Road)	Western terminus of IL 58
Kane	Elgin	8.1	13.0	IL 19 east (Chicago Street/Chicago-Elgin Road)	Western terminus of IL 19
Kane	Elgin	9.2	14.8	To US 20 (Elgin Bypass/Grant Highway/Dr. Martin Luther King Jr. Memorial Highway)	
Kane	St. Charles	17.7	28.5	IL 64 (Main Street)	
Kane	Geneva	19.6	31.5	IL 38 (State Street)	
Kane	Batavia	21.1	34.0	CR 8 (Fabyan Parkway)	
Kane	North Aurora	25.5	41.0	IL 56 (Butterfield Road/State Street)	
Kane	Montgomery	31.7	51.0	CR 29 east (Mill Street, Montgomery Road)	Western terminus of CR 29
Kendall	Oswego	35.04	56.39	US 34 (Madison Street/Chicago Road)	Southern terminus
1.000 mi = 1.609 km; 1.000 km = 0.621 mi
