= Joslin, Illinois =

- Unincorporated community
- Location within Illinois Location within the United States
- Coordinates: 41°33′24″N 90°14′12″W
- Country: United States
- State: Illinois
- County: Rock Island

Area
  - Total: 4.92 sq mi (12.74 km^{2})
  - Land: 4.64 sq mi (12.02 km^{2})
  - Water: 0.27 sq mi (0.71 km^{2})
- Elevation: 581 ft (177 m)

Population (2020)
  - Total: 85
  - Density: 18.3/sq mi (7.07/km^{2})
- Time zone: UTC-6 (Central (CST))
  - Summer (DST): UTC-5 (CDT)
- Area code: 309
- GNIS feature ID: 2806505

Joslin is an unincorporated community in Rock Island County, Illinois, United States and is located on Illinois Route 92 near Interstate 88. As of the 2020 census, Joslin had a population of 85.

Tyson operated a beef slaughter plant in Joslin.

== History ==
The Joslin Fairgrounds were the original site of the Rock Island County Fair, from the first fair in 1892 until the late 1920s.

== Demographics ==
Historical population
Census	Pop.	Note	%±
2020	85		—
U.S. Decennial Census

Joslin first appeared as a census designated place in the 2020 U.S. census.

=== 2020 census ===
Joslin CDP, Illinois – Racial and ethnic composition Note: the US Census treats Hispanic/Latino as an ethnic category. This table excludes Latinos from the racial categories and assigns them to a separate category. Hispanics/Latinos may be of any race.
Race / Ethnicity (NH = Non-Hispanic)	Pop 2020	% 2020
White alone (NH)	81	95.29%
Black or African American alone (NH)	0	0.00%
Native American or Alaska Native alone (NH)	0	0.00%
Asian alone (NH)	0	0.00%
Native Hawaiian or Pacific Islander alone (NH)	0	0.00%
Other race alone (NH)	0	0.00%
Mixed race or Multiracial (NH)	3	3.53%
Hispanic or Latino (any race)	1	1.18%
Total	85	100.00%

== Education ==
It is in the Riverdale Community Unit School District 100.
