= Interstate 88 (Illinois) =

Interstate Highway in Illinois

Interstate 88
- Ronald Reagan Memorial Tollway
- I-88 highlighted in red

Route information
- Maintained by IDOT and ISTHA
- Length: 140.60 mi (226.27 km)
- Existed: July 1987–present
- NHS: Entire route

Major junctions
- West end: I-80 / IL 5 / IL 92 / IL 110 (CKC) near East Moline
- US 30 in Rock Falls; I-39 / US 51 in Rochelle; I-355 Toll in Downers Grove; I-294 Toll in Hillside
- East end: I-290 / IL 110 (CKC) in Hillside

Location
- Country: United States
- State: Illinois
- Counties: Rock Island, Whiteside, Lee, Ogle, DeKalb, Kane, DuPage, Cook

Highway system
- Interstate Highway System; Main; Auxiliary; Suffixed; Business; Future; Illinois State Highway System; Interstate; US; State; Tollways; Scenic
| ← IL 84 | → IL 88 |

Interstate 88 (I-88) is an Interstate Highway in the US state of Illinois that runs from an interchange with I-80 near Silvis and Moline to an interchange with I-290 and I-294 in Hillside, near Chicago. I-88 is 140.60 miles (226.27 km) long. This route is not contiguous with I-88 in New York. Since 2010, most of I-88 has been part of the Chicago–Kansas City Expressway. The highway also runs through the cities of Aurora, Naperville, DeKalb, and Dixon. East of Rock Falls, the route is a part of the Illinois Tollway system as the Ronald Reagan Memorial Tollway, previously the East-West Tollway.

== Route description ==
I-88 runs concurrently with Illinois Route 110 (IL 110) and its speed limit is 70 mph (110 km/h) west of IL 47. East of this point, the speed limit is 65 mph (105 km/h) to the Aurora toll plaza, and 60 mph (97 km/h) for the rest of its route.

=== East Moline to Rock Falls ===
Starting at I-80 at a cloverleaf interchange, IL 5 ends there while IL 92 continues eastward. I-88 begins at that interchange and then traverses eastward. Immediately east of the cloverleaf, I-88, IL 92, and IL 110 meet a road at a diamond interchange. This road used to be part of IL 2 and IL 92. They then traverse eastward until IL 92 branches off east near Joslin. The freeway then meets the next two local roads, each having a diamond interchange. One of the interchanges serves Hillsdale while the other one serves Erie. The two routes then meet IL 78 near Lyndon. Near Como, they then meet US 30 at a trumpet interchange. South of Rock Falls, they then meet IL 40 at a diamond interchange. East of Yeoward Addition, they again meet U.S. Route 30 (US 30) at a diamond interchange.

=== Rock Falls to Aurora ===
After US 30, I-88/IL 110 becomes an ISTHA-maintained tollway. However, at the IL 26 interchange, there are no tolls present on each ramp. Beyond that, the tollway crosses under US 52 without direct access. Then, the tollway crosses through its first mainline toll plaza. Further east, they meet IL 251 (at a diamond interchange) and I-39/US 51 (at a cloverleaf interchange) at Rochelle. From then on, they meet another mainline toll plaza. In DeKalb, they meet Annie Glidden Road at a trumpet interchange, then cross over IL 23 without direct access, serve DeKalb Oasis, and meet Peace Road at a four-ramp parclo. South of Nottingham Woods, they meet IL 47 at a five-ramp parclo with two ramps. Further east, IL 56 enters eastward on the tollway. They then meet Orchard Road at a four-ramp parclo. Then, IL 56 leaves the freeway at the IL 31 interchange.

=== Aurora to Hillside ===
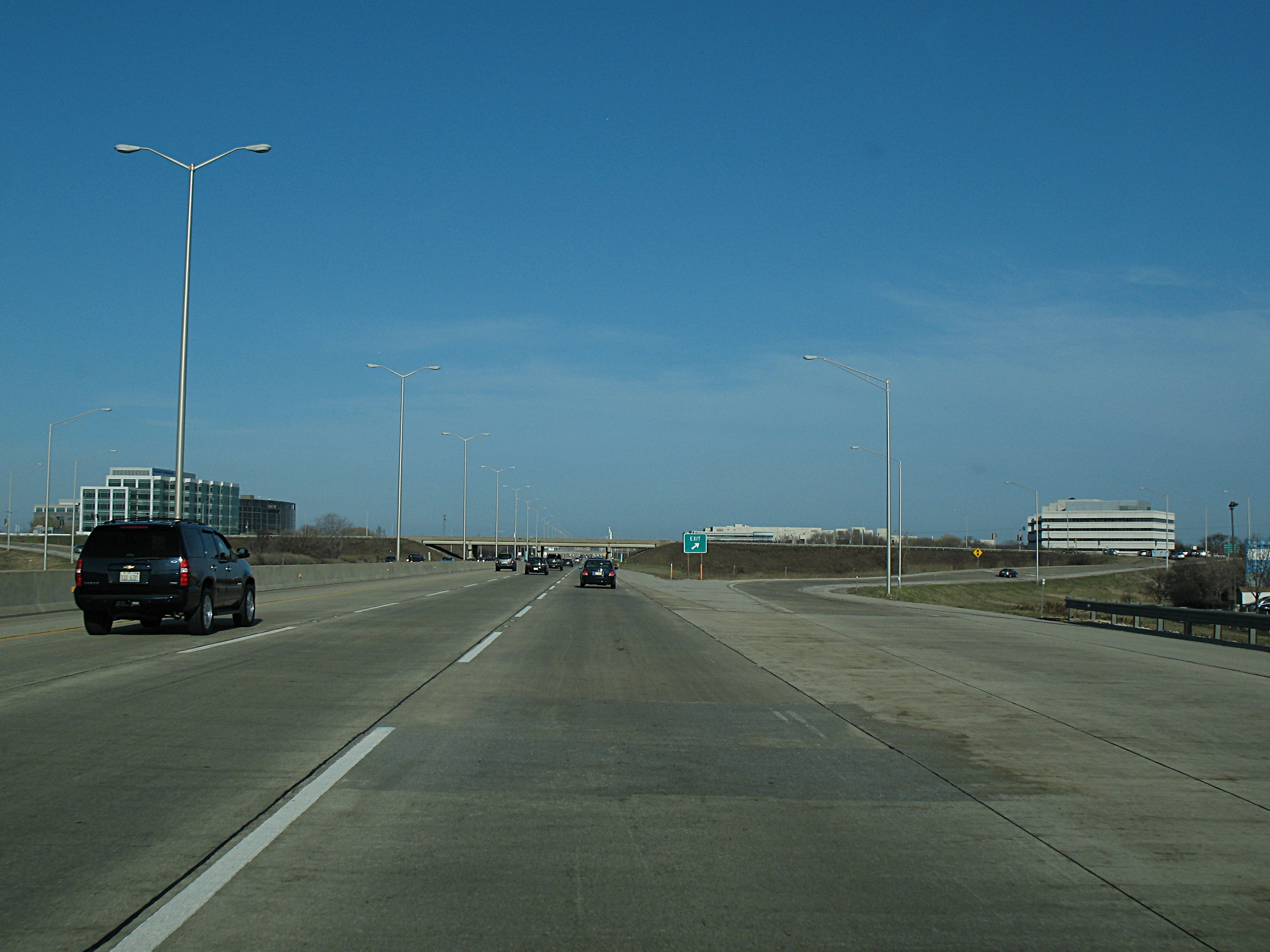
Ronald Reagan Memorial Tollway in Naperville, heading east

Across the Fox River, I-88/IL 110 meets another toll plaza. Then, the tollway meets Farnsworth Avenue at a six-ramp parclo near the Chicago Premium Outlets, Eola Road, IL 59 at a diverging diamond interchange, Winfield Road at a diamond interchange, Naperville Road at a mix of partial interchanges, and IL 53 at an incomplete parclo. Beyond that, they meet I-355 at a mix of interchanges. At Highland Avenue interchange, all but the westbound onramp are present. The other one enters I-88 westbound from Downers Drive. After that, the eastbound tollway meets another mainline toll plaza. After that, I-88 and IL 110 then meet Midwest Road at a two-ramp incomplete parclo (no westbound on/offramp), then IL 83 at a three-ramp incomplete parclo, 22nd Street at a right-in/right-out (no eastbound on/offramp), another mainline toll plaza for westbound traffic, and I-294/IL 38. Beyond I-294/IL 38, the tollway briefly becomes a free road before I-88 ends at I-290. At that point, IL 110 continues east via I-290 all the way toward the Jane Byrne Interchange near downtown Chicago.

== History ==
=== Original section ===
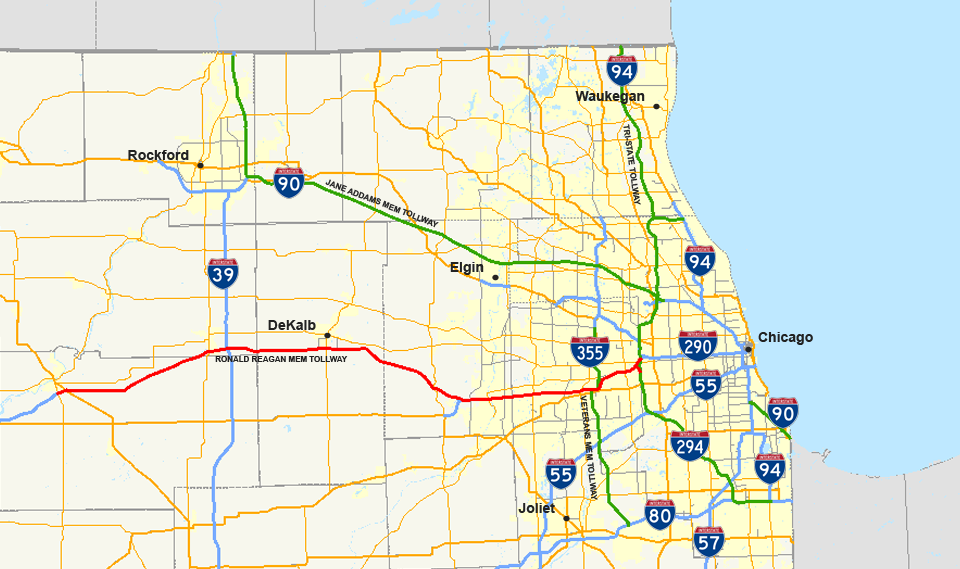
Map of the Ronald Reagan Memorial Tollway, the tolled portion of I-88

Opened November 21, 1958, the East–West Tollway was initially designated as part of U.S. Route 30 Toll (US 30 Toll). The original routing ran from the I-294 interchange near Hillside to US 30/IL 47 near Sugar Grove. IL 56 (previously IL 55 west of Oak Brook) ran along the East-West Tollway between North Aurora and Sugar Grove. In 1966, with the removal of US 30 Toll, Illinois Route 190 was assigned to the tollway.

=== Extensions ===
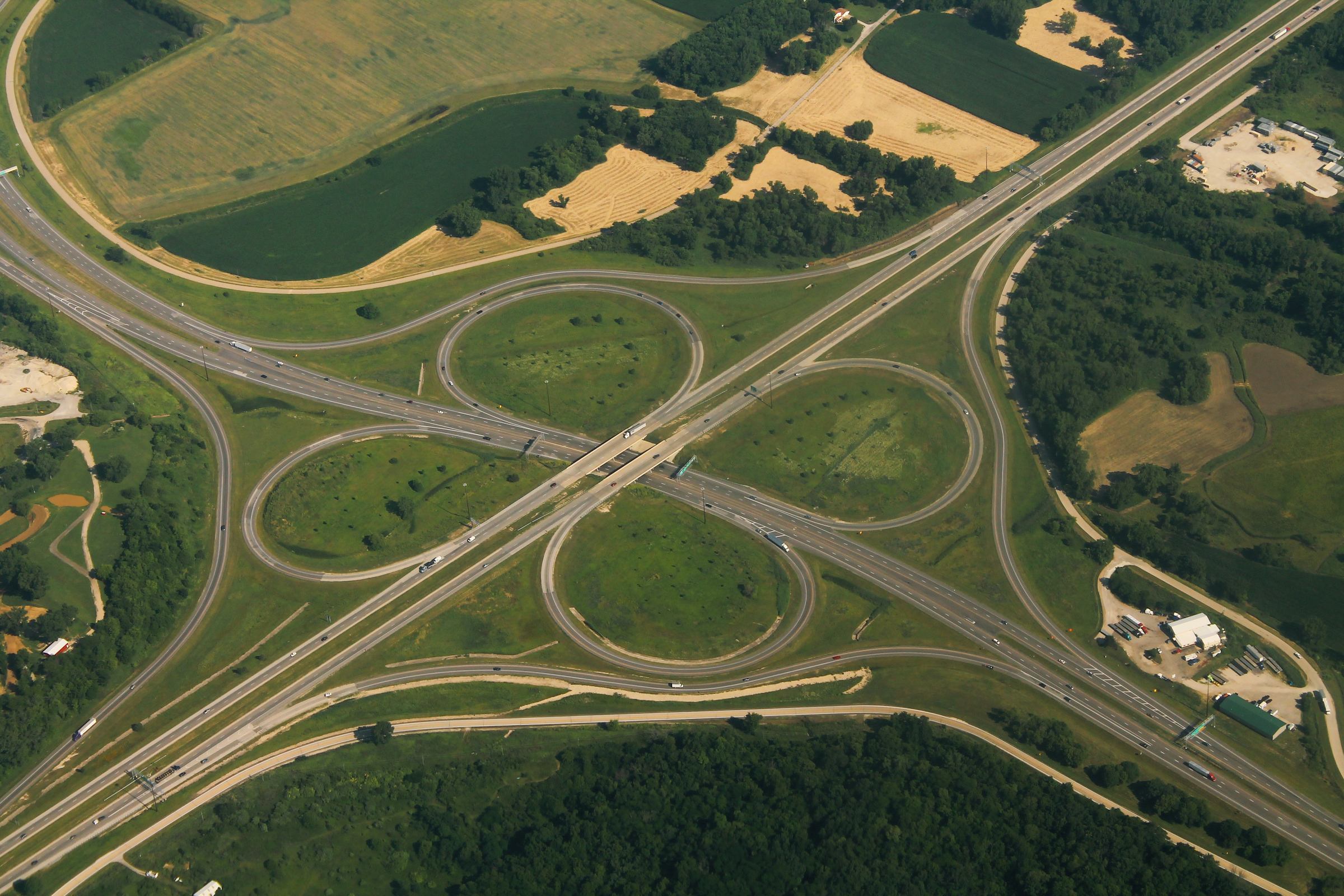
Western terminus of I-88 at the interchange with I-80 in East Moline

IL 190 was renumbered as IL 5 in 1971, as construction on the 69-mile-long tollway extension to Rock Falls began that year. Consequently, IL 190 was removed from the stretch between Aurora and Sugar Grove, making that section strictly IL 56. The extension opened in stages in 1974. The extension to DeKalb, Rochelle, and Rock Falls opened on August 15, September 29, and November 15, respectively. Although a federal law, 23 U.S.C. § 111, prohibits the operation of commercial rest areas constructed after January 1, 1960, on Interstate Highways, the DeKalb oasis was constructed at milepost 93 in 1975, prior to the route's designation as I-88, and remains in operation.

Beyond US 30 east of Rock Falls, further freeway extensions are not subject to tolls. The extension to US 30 near Como serves as a bypass of Rock Falls. Starting from Como, there was a plan to build two federal-aid primary (FAP) freeways connecting to the following cities: FAP 402 to Clinton, Iowa, and FAP 403 to East Moline. Ultimately, only FAP 403 was being built. By 1979, the entirety of FAP 403 opened, extending the IL 5 designation over the completed freeway and supplanting IL 2 west of Sterling.

=== Redesignation to Interstate 88 ===
The reason for I-88's original designation and continued existence as an Interstate has to do with a technicality in the old National Maximum Speed Law (NMSL). Originally passed in 1973, the NMSL was amended in 1987 to permit 65-mile-per-hour (105 km/h) speed limits on rural stretches of Interstate Highways only.

Even though IL 5 was fully up to Interstate Highway standards, it still had to carry a 55-mile-per-hour (89 km/h) limit because of this wording in the NMSL. The Illinois Department of Transportation (IDOT) and Illinois State Toll Highway Authority (ISTHA) petitioned the American Association of State Highway and Transportation Officials (AASHTO) to redesignate IL 5 as an Interstate, and, in 1987, AASHTO approved the request and assigned the I-88 numbering to the freeway portion of IL 5. The NMSL would be completely repealed only eight years later in 1995, but the I-88 shields remain to this day.

=== Later history ===
After the death of Illinois native and former President Ronald Reagan in 2004, ISTHA voted to rename the toll roadway "Ronald Reagan Memorial Tollway" in his memory, as it passes near his birthplace of Tampico and grazes the south outskirts of his boyhood hometown of Dixon. The tollway portion of I-88 was previously known as the "East–West Tollway" and is still displayed as such on some signs near Chicago.

From 2005 lasting through 2012, ISTHA reconstructed and widened much of the original portion of I-88, between York Road and IL 56. Approximately $991.6 million (equivalent to $1.34 billion in 2024) was budgeted for I-88 over that period. Between 2005 and 2009, I-88 was reconstructed and widened to four lanes in each direction between IL 59 and York Road, with work progressing gradually from west to east. The project included a reconstruction and reconfiguration of the Naperville Road interchange. Between IL 56 and the Aurora Toll Plaza, I-88 was reconstructed and widened to three lanes in each direction, including the reconstruction of the IL 31 interchange and new bridges over the Fox River.

== Exit list ==
| County | Location | mi | km | Exit | Destinations | Notes |
|---|---|---|---|---|---|---|
| Rock Island | Hampton Township | 0.00 | 0.00 | | IL 5 west / IL 92 west – Moline, Rock Island | Continuation beyond western terminus; western end of IL 92 concurrency |
| Rock Island | East Moline | 0.00 | 0.00 | 1 | I-80 / IL 110 (CKC) west to I-74 – Des Moines, Peoria | Signed as exits 1A (east) and 1B (west); western end of IL 110 concurrency; I-80 exit 4B |
| Rock Island | East Moline | 0.75 | 1.21 | 2 | Old IL 2 | Former IL 2 |
| Rock Island | Joslin | 5.69 | 9.16 | 6 | IL 92 east (38th Avenue North) – Joslin | Eastern end of IL 92 concurrency |
| Rock Island | Hillsdale | 10.26 | 16.51 | 10 | Hillsdale, Port Byron | |
| Whiteside | Erie | 18.44 | 29.68 | 18 | Erie, Albany | To IL 84 |
| Whiteside | Lyndon | 25.70 | 41.36 | 26 | IL 78 (Crosby Road) – Morrison, Prophetstown | Former IL 2 |
| Whiteside | Rock Falls | 36.16 | 58.19 | 36 | To US 30 – Clinton, Rock Falls, Sterling | |
| Whiteside | Rock Falls | 41.11 | 66.16 | 41 | IL 40 (Hoover Road) – Rock Falls, Sterling | |
| Whiteside | Rock Falls | 43.98 | 70.78 | 44 | US 30 – Joliet, Rock Falls | Eastern end of Ronald Reagan Memorial Highway; western end of Ronald Reagan Memorial Tollway |
| Lee | Dixon | 54.12 | 87.10 | 54 | IL 26 (Galena Avenue) – Dixon | |
| Lee | Dixon | 56.15 | 90.36 | Dixon Toll Plaza 69 | | |
| Ogle | Rochelle | 75.87 | 122.10 | 76 | IL 251 – Rochelle, Mendota | Former US 51 |
| Ogle | Rochelle | 78.33 | 126.06 | 78 | I-39 / US 51 – Bloomington, Normal, Rockford | Signed as exits 78A (south) and 78B (north); I-39 exit 97 |
| DeKalb | DeKalb | 86.25 | 138.81 | DeKalb Toll Plaza 66 | | |
| DeKalb | DeKalb | 91.12 | 146.64 | 91 | Annie Glidden Road to IL 38 / IL 23 – DeKalb | Toll on westbound exit and eastbound entrance ramps |
| DeKalb | DeKalb | 93.25 | 150.07 | DeKalb Oasis | | |
| DeKalb | DeKalb | 93.73 | 150.84 | 94 | Peace Road to IL 38 | Toll on westbound exit and eastbound entrance ramps |
| Kane | Sugar Grove | 108.97 | 175.37 | 109 | IL 47 – Sugar Grove, Elburn | Toll on westbound exit and eastbound entrance ramps |
| Kane | Aurora | 113.00 | 181.86 | 113 | IL 56 west to US 30 – Sugar Grove | Western end of IL 56 concurrency; westbound exit and eastbound entrance |
| Kane | Aurora | 114.06 | 183.56 | 114 | CR 83 (Orchard Road) | Was exit 115; toll on eastbound exit and westbound entrance ramps |
| Kane | North Aurora | 116.52 | 187.52 | 117 | IL 31 (Lincolnway Street) / IL 56 east – Aurora, Batavia | Eastern end of IL 56 concurrency; toll on eastbound exit and westbound entrance ramps |
| Kane | Aurora | 117.48 | 189.07 | Aurora Toll Plaza 61 | | |
| Kane | Aurora | 118.88 | 191.32 | 119 | Farnsworth Avenue | Signed as exits 119A (south) and 119B (north) westbound; toll on westbound exit and eastbound entrance ramps |
| DuPage | Aurora | 120.67– 120.86 | 194.20– 194.51 | 121 | To CR 14 (Eola Road) | Toll on westbound exit and eastbound entrance ramps |
| DuPage | Naperville | 122.93 | 197.84 | 123 | IL 59 – Naperville, Plainfield, Warrenville, West Chicago | Diverging diamond interchange as of October 2015 |
| DuPage | Warrenville | 124.81 | 200.86 | 125 | CR 13 (Winfield Road) – Warrenville, Winfield, Naperville | Toll on eastbound exit and westbound entrance ramps |
| DuPage | Naperville | 127.01– 127.30 | 204.40– 204.87 | 127 | To CR 23 (Naperville Road) – Naperville, Wheaton | Toll on eastbound exit and westbound entrance ramps |
| DuPage | Lisle | 129.63 | 208.62 | 130 | IL 53 (Lincoln Avenue) | Westbound exit and eastbound entrance |
| DuPage | Downers Grove | 130.94– 132.82 | 210.73– 213.75 | 131 | I-355 Toll (Veterans Memorial Tollway) to US 34 (Ogden Avenue) – Joliet, Rockford | Signed as exits 131A (south) and 131B (north) westbound; signed as exits 131 (south) and 132 (north) eastbound; I-355 exit 20 |
| DuPage | Downers Grove | 133.88 | 215.46 | 134 | CR 9 (Highland Avenue) to IL 56 – Downers Grove, Lombard | Toll on eastbound exit and westbound entrance ramps; westbound entrance via Downers Drive |
| DuPage | Oak Brook | 134.62 | 216.65 | Meyers Road Toll Plaza 52 (eastbound) | | |
| DuPage | Oak Brook | 136.02 | 218.90 | 136 | CR 15 (Midwest Road) | Eastbound exit and entrance; toll on entrance ramp |
| DuPage | Oak Brook | 136.77 | 220.11 | 137 | IL 83 south (Kingery Highway) – Oak Brook, Hinsdale | Westbound exit and eastbound entrance; toll on eastbound entrance ramp |
| DuPage | Oak Brook | 137.29 | 220.95 | 138 | 22nd Street (Cermak Road) to IL 83 north (Kingery Highway) | Westbound entrance and exit; toll on entrance ramp |
| DuPage | Oak Brook | 137.73 | 221.65 | York Road Toll Plaza 53 (westbound) | | |
| DuPage | Oak Brook | 138.27 | 222.52 | 138 | I-294 Toll south (Tri-State Tollway) – Indiana; To York Road | Eastbound exit and westbound entrance; exit includes direct exit ramp onto York Road; York Road exit signed as exit 138 eastbound; I-294 exit 29 |
| Cook | Hillside | 139.64 | 224.73 | 139 | I-294 Toll north (Tri-State Tollway) – Milwaukee, O'Hare I-290 west (Eisenhower Expressway) – Rockford | Eastbound exit and westbound entrance; I-294 exit 31A |
| Cook | Hillside | 139.64 | 224.73 | 139 | I-294 Toll south (Tri-State Tollway) – Indiana IL 38 west (Roosevelt Road) | Westbound exit and eastbound entrance |
| Cook | Hillside | 140.15– 140.38 | 225.55– 225.92 | 140 | I-290 east (Eisenhower Expressway) to US 12 / US 20 / US 45 (Mannheim Road) – Chicago | Eastbound exit only; all trucks must exit onto a local lane |
| Cook | Hillside | 140.15– 140.38 | 225.55– 225.92 | – | I-290 east / IL 110 (CKC) east (Eisenhower Expressway) – Chicago | Eastern terminus; eastern end of Ronald Reagan Memorial Tollway; eastern end of IL 110 concurrency; I-290 exit 15A |
1.000 mi = 1.609 km; 1.000 km = 0.621 mi: Concurrency terminus; Electronic toll collection; Incomplete access; Route transition
