= Illinois Route 62 =

State highway in northeastern Illinois, US

Illinois Route 62
- Algonquin Road
- IL 62 highlighted in red

Route information
- Maintained by IDOT
- Length: 20.82 mi (33.51 km)
- Existed: 1924–present

Major junctions
- West end: IL 31 / CR A48 in Algonquin
- East end: IL 83 in Des Plaines

Location
- Country: United States
- State: Illinois
- Counties: McHenry, Kane, Cook

Highway system
- Illinois State Highway System; Interstate; US; State; Tollways; Scenic
← US 62	→ IL 63

Illinois Route 62 (IL 62) is a 20.82-mile-long (33.51 km) east–west state highway in northeast Illinois. It runs from western Algonquin at IL 31 (Western Algonquin Bypass) to the intersection with IL 83 (Elmhurst Road) by industrial Mount Prospect.

== Route description ==
IL 62, looking east from Arlington Heights Road

IL 62 is called Algonquin Road for its entire length, and it is a northern parallel to Interstate 90 (I-90). It is one of the few state roads in Illinois to be shorter than the name of the road that it marks, as Algonquin Road continues westward as McHenry CR A48 to IL 47 (about eight miles [13 km]), eastward as a local road to Oakton Street and Riverside Drive by I-294 (about five miles [8.0 km]), and northward as a local road to U.S. Route 14 (US 14, about five miles [8.0 km]) in Fox River Grove. The eastward extent of Algonquin Road is mainly residential, however. It is a four lane street through downtown Algonquin and then shifts to a two lane rural road east of IL 25. It returns to a four lane urban artery east of IL 59.

In 2017, IL 62 had an average daily traffic (ADT) of 35,000 on the segment between in Algonquin west of IL 25; 27,000 on the segment between IL 25 and Helm Road; and 39,000 on the segment east of IL 68.

== History ==
SBI Route 62 was Algonquin to Chicago along the current IL 62. It followed Oakton Street and Talcott Road (in Park Ridge) to reach IL 43. By 1979, IL 62 was dropped east of IL 83. In 2014, the western terminus of IL 62 was extended west from Main Street to Western Algonquin Bypass.

The Western Algonquin Bypass opened to traffic in September 2014. The bypass has a diamond interchange with Algonquin Road. The bypass removes through north–south traffic on IL-31 from Main Street at the intersection of Main Street and Algonquin Road/IL 62 in downtown Algonquin.

== Future ==
The Western Algonquin Bypass is not the only limited access bypass on the table anymore as of 2015. A southern Algonquin bypass is also being constructed as the Longmeadow Parkway which terminates at IL 62 in Barrington Hills.

Starting in 2017, the Illinois Department of Transportation (IDOT) conducted a study of IL 62 from IL 25 to IL 68. The recommended alternative is to convert this section of IL 62 into a four-lane divided highway with a separate multi-use trail. When this is completed, IL 62 will be four lanes for substantially its entire length.

== Major intersections ==
County	Location	mi	km	Destinations	Notes
McHenry	Algonquin	0.0	0.0	IL 31 (Western Algonquin Bypass)	Interchange; Western terminus of IL 62; roadway continues as CR A48 west
McHenry–Kane county line	Algonquin	2.1	3.4	Lake Cook Road east	Western terminus of Lake Cook Road
Kane	Algonquin–Barrington Hills village line	2.4	3.9	IL 25 south (John F. Kennedy Drive, Haegers Bend Road)	Northern terminus of IL 25
Cook	Barrington Hills	7.1	11.4	IL 68 west (Dundee Road)	Western end of IL 68 overlap
Cook	Barrington Hills	7.4	11.9	IL 59 (Sutton Road) / IL 68 east (Dundee Road)	Eastern end of IL 68 overlap
Cook	Rolling Meadows	15.9	25.6	IL 53 to I-90 Toll / I-290	Interchange
Cook	Rolling Meadows–Arlington Heights city line	17.9	28.8	IL 58 (Golf Road / Elgin-Evanston Road)	
Cook	Arlington Heights–Des Plaines city line	20.82	33.51	IL 83 (Elmhurst Road)	Eastern terminus of IL 62
1.000 mi = 1.609 km; 1.000 km = 0.621 mi: Concurrency terminus
