= Illinois Route 38 =

State highway in northern Illinois, US

Illinois Route 38
- Lincoln Highway; Roosevelt Road
- IL 38 highlighted in red

Route information
- Maintained by IDOT
- Length: 88.86 mi (143.01 km)
- Existed: November 5, 1918–present

Major junctions
- West end: US 52 in Dixon
- I-39 / US 51 in Rochelle I-355 Toll in Glen Ellyn I-88 Toll / IL 110 (CKC) in Hillside I-294 Toll in Hillside
- East end: US 12 / US 20 / US 45 in Westchester

Location
- Country: United States
- State: Illinois
- Counties: Lee, Ogle, DeKalb, Kane, DuPage, Cook

Highway system
- Illinois State Highway System; Interstate; US; State; Tollways; Scenic
← IL 37	→ I-39

Illinois Route 38 is an 88.86-mile-long (143.01 km) west–east state highway that runs across northern Illinois. It runs from U.S. Route 52 (US 52) in downtown Dixon to US 12/US 20/US 45 (Mannheim Road) in Westchester. It runs concurrently with the Lincoln Highway between Dixon and the junction of Illinois Route 31 in Geneva where it transitions via State Street onto Roosevelt Road at the junction of Kirk Road and continues through the western suburbs of Chicago to its terminus at the junction of Mannheim Road. Roosevelt Road continues on an additional 14 miles without a route designation until terminating at US 41 (Lake Shore Drive).

Illinois Route 38 travels along the former route of US 330, that existed from 1926 to 1942. It spanned from Galt to Lynwood.

== Route description ==
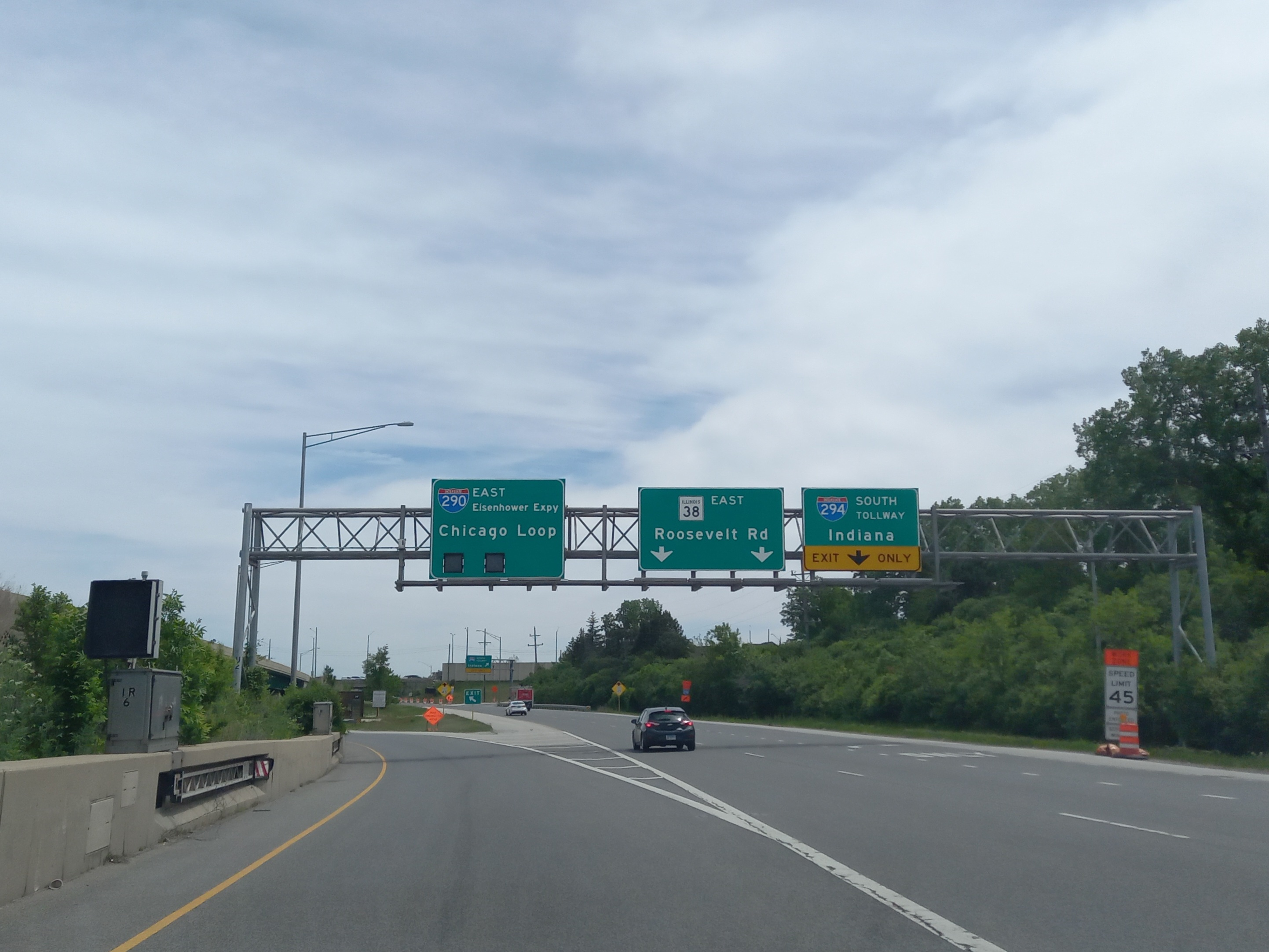
IL 38 at an exit ramp to I-290

Illinois 38 runs along the historic Lincoln Highway for much of its length, and parallels Interstate 88 as well. Illinois 38 serves some cities that have no interchanges on Interstate 88. It enters the Chicago metropolitan area at Elburn, as this border is pushed west with the extension of the Metra rail system. Except in cities, Illinois 38 has two lanes west of Geneva.

Illinois 38 generally has two lanes west of the Fox River, except in cities, and four lanes east of the river. From Villa Park to Interstate 294, Illinois 38 expands to six lanes and becomes a limited-access freeway with exits to Illinois Route 56, Illinois Route 83, York Road, Interstate 290 and Interstate 294. The ramp to Interstate 290 has an automated gate system that closes during high-volume periods, such as rush hours.

== History ==
SBI Route 38 initially ran between Kampsville and Jerseyville. In 1937, IL 38's western terminus was truncated as IL 100 was extended south of Kampsville while its eastern terminus was extended to Mount Clare. By 1941, the original route of IL 38 was decommissioned and was replaced by IL 16, IL 112, and IL 138. It remained decommissioned until 1972 when a section of US 30 Alt. west of Westchester was replaced with IL 38; the rest of US 30 Alt. was removed without any replacement route designations.

In 1914, one mile of a road near Malta, Illinois, was paved with concrete. This was the first "Seedling Mile" of the concrete road on the Lincoln Highway. Seedling Miles were constructed on several portions of the Lincoln Highway to encourage the paving of the highway from coast to coast.

The Lincoln Highway was routed along modern-day Route 38 between Geneva and Dixon. When numbered US Highways began to replace named cross-country roads (like US 30 for the Lincoln Highway), this stretch of highway was signed as Alternate US 30. In 1972, as traffic patterns shifted, these alternates to US highways became unnecessary and fell out of favor.

=== U.S. Route 330 ===
U.S. Route 330
- Location: Galt–Lynwood, Illinois
- Existed: 1926–1942

U.S. Route 330 (US 330) was a U.S. Highway that traveled from Galt to Lynwood, and was in service from 1926 to 1942. It has since been replaced in its entirety by Illinois Route 38 west of Bellwood, and by other local roads east of Bellwood to Lynwood.

US 330 branched off at Geneva, where US 30 ran along present Illinois Route 38 and Illinois Route 31, and ran east to Chicago. After several extensions on the west end, it became part of U.S. Route 30 Alternate from 1942 to 1971 and then Illinois 38 west of Mannheim Road since 1971.

== Major intersections ==
County	Location	mi	km	Destinations	Notes
Lee	Dixon	0.0	0.0	US 52 / Lincoln Highway west (Chicago Avenue)	West end of Lincoln Highway concurrency
Ogle	Rochelle	25.3	40.7	IL 251 south (7th Street) Lincoln Highway east	Western end of IL 251 concurrency; eastern end of Lincoln Highway concurrency; access from IL 38 east to IL 251 south is via 8th Street and 4th Avenue
Ogle	Rochelle	26.1	42.0	IL 251 north (7th Street)	Eastern end of IL 251 concurrency
Ogle	Rochelle			Lincoln Highway west	Western end of Lincoln Highway concurrency
Ogle	Rochelle	28.4	45.7	I-39 / US 51 – Rockford, LaSalle, Peru	I-39 exit 99
DeKalb	DeKalb	42.6	68.6	IL 23 (4th Street)	
Kane	Elburn	57.3	92.2	IL 47 (Main Street)	
Kane	Geneva	66.3	106.7	IL 31 / Lincoln Highway east (1st Street)	Eastern end of Lincoln Highway concurrency
Kane	Geneva	66.6	107.2	IL 25 (Bennett Street)	
DuPage	West Chicago	72.4	116.5	IL 59 (Neltnor Boulevard)	Interchange
DuPage	Glen Ellyn	79.8	128.4	To IL 53 (Bryant Avenue)	
DuPage	Glen Ellyn–Lombard line	80.4	129.4	I-355 Toll (Veterans Memorial Tollway) – Joliet, Northwest Suburbs	I-355 exit 24
DuPage	Oakbrook Terrace	84.7	136.3	IL 83 (Kingery Highway)	Interchange
DuPage	Oakbrook Terrace	84.9	136.6	IL 56 (Butterfield Road)	Interchange; eastbound access is via IL 83 south
DuPage	Elmhurst	86.1	138.6	York Road	Interchange
DuPage	Oak Brook	86.5	139.2	I-290 east / IL 110 (CKC) east (Eisenhower Expressway) – Chicago Loop	Eastbound exit and westbound entrance; exit ramp closes during rush hour; I-290 exit 15A
Cook	Hillside	86.8	139.7	I-294 Toll south (Tri-State Tollway) – Indiana	No access to I-294 north or from I-294 south; I-294 exit 30
Cook	Westchester	89.28	143.68	US 12 / US 20 / US 45 (Mannheim Road) to I-290; Roosevelt Road	Roosevelt Road continues east
1.000 mi = 1.609 km; 1.000 km = 0.621 mi: Concurrency terminus; Incomplete access
