= Roosevelt Road =

Street in Chicago, Illinois, United States

Coordinates: 41°52′1.9″N 87°38′45.9″W

- Theodore Roosevelt Memorial Highway; 1200 South
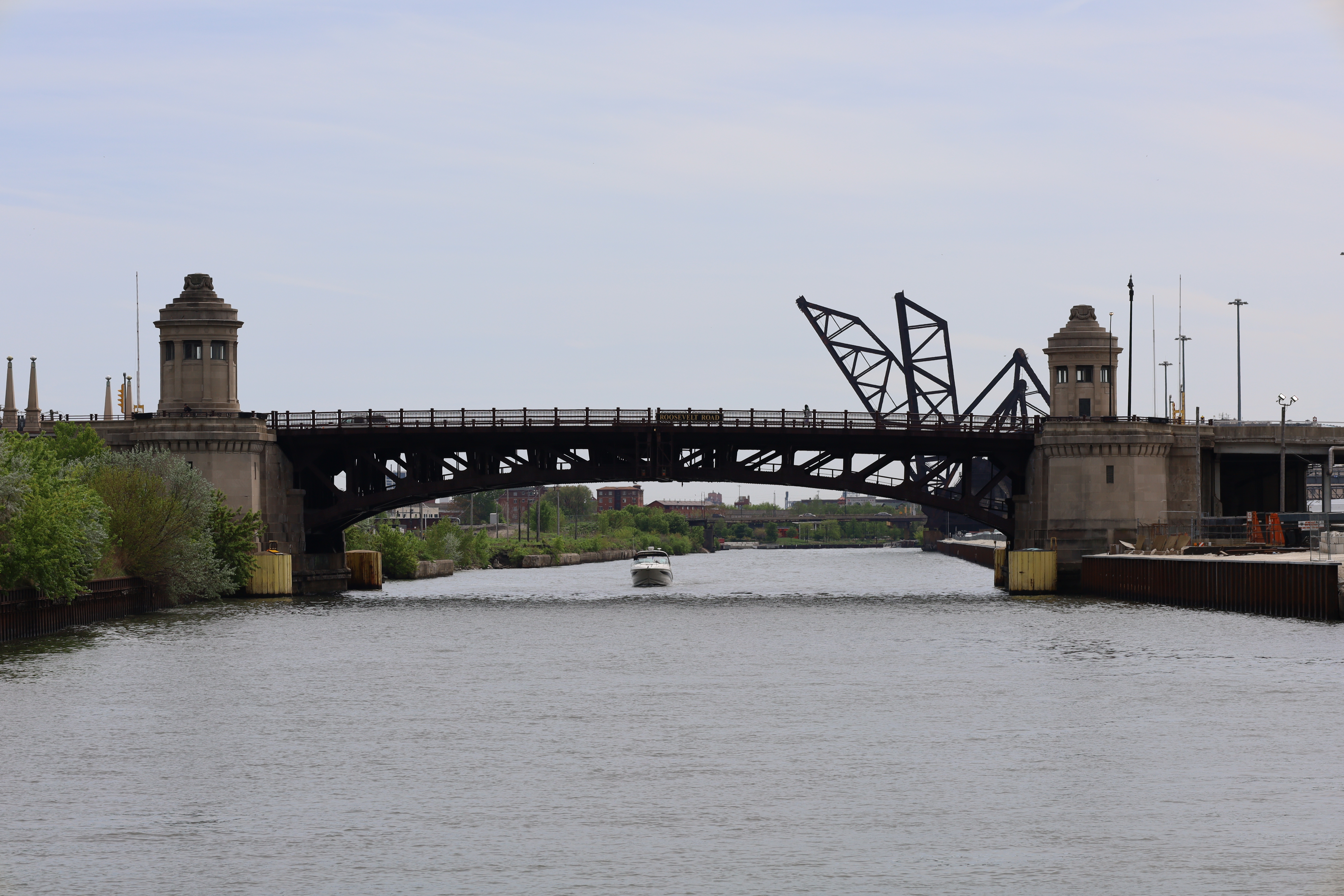
- The bridge in 2023
- Interactive map of Roosevelt Road
- Former name: 12th Street
- Part of: IL 38
- Location: Kane, DuPage, and Cook counties in Illinois, United States
- East end: Lake Shore Drive (300 E) in Chicago
- West end: Geneva-West Chicago city line (Kautz Road)

Roosevelt Road (originally named 12th Street) is a major east-west street in the city of Chicago, Illinois, and its western suburbs. It is 1200 South in the city's street numbering system, but (Note: A mile is usually a unit of 800 in Chicago's grid.) only 1 mile (1.6 km) south of Madison Street. It runs under this name from Columbus Drive at the southern end of Grant Park to the western city limits, then continues through the western suburbs including Lombard, Wheaton and, West Chicago until it reaches Geneva, where it is known as State Street.

== History ==
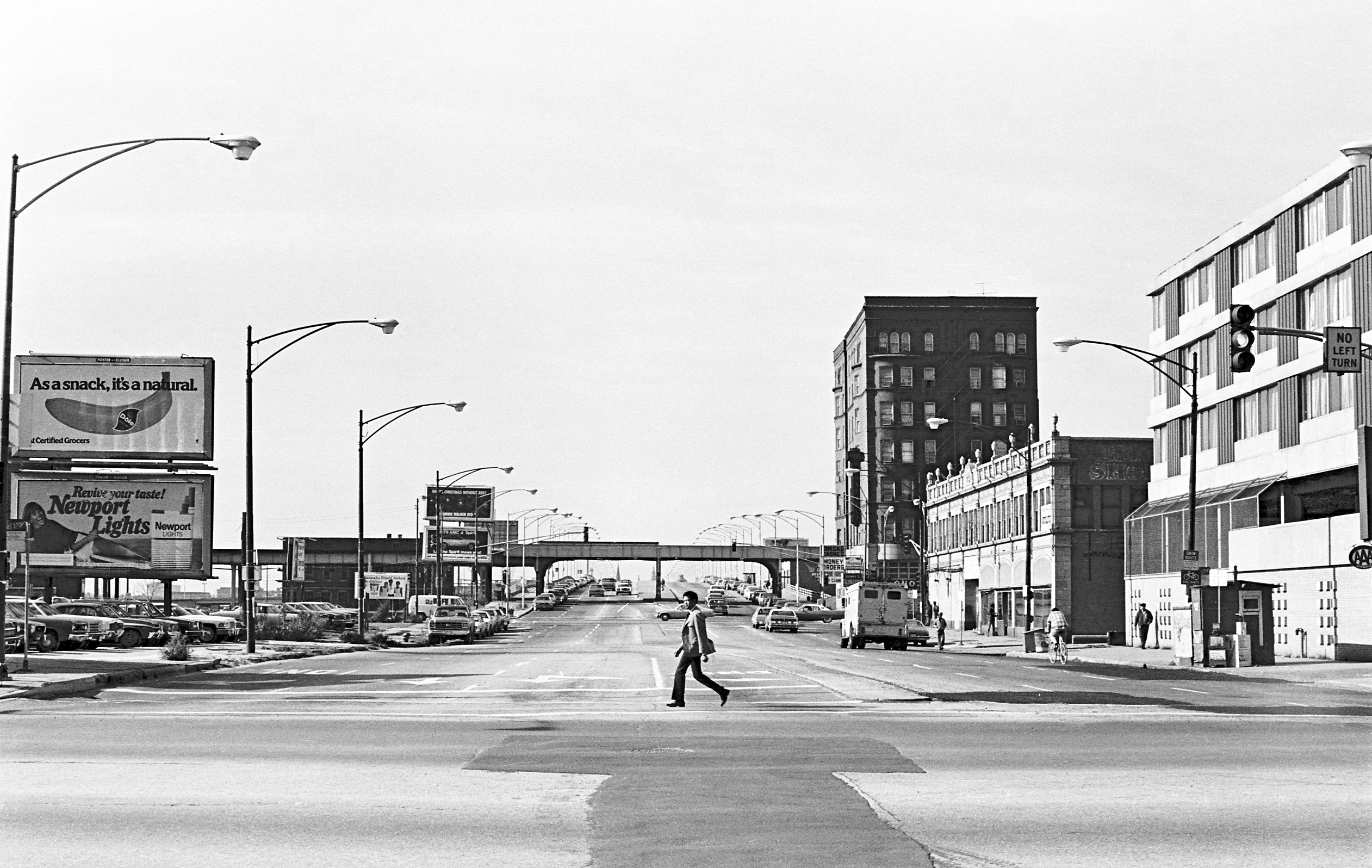
Looking west from Michigan Avenue along Roosevelt Road in 1978

12th Street was renamed to Roosevelt Road on May 25, 1919, in recognition of President Theodore Roosevelt, who had died the previous January. In 1928, the new U.S. Route 330 (US 330), a different alignment of US 30, went down Roosevelt Road to Geneva, which was originally designated as SBI Route 6. In 1942 it was redesignated as US 30 Alternate. In 1972, after the route had been discontinued, Roosevelt Road outside Chicago became Illinois Route 38.

== Route ==
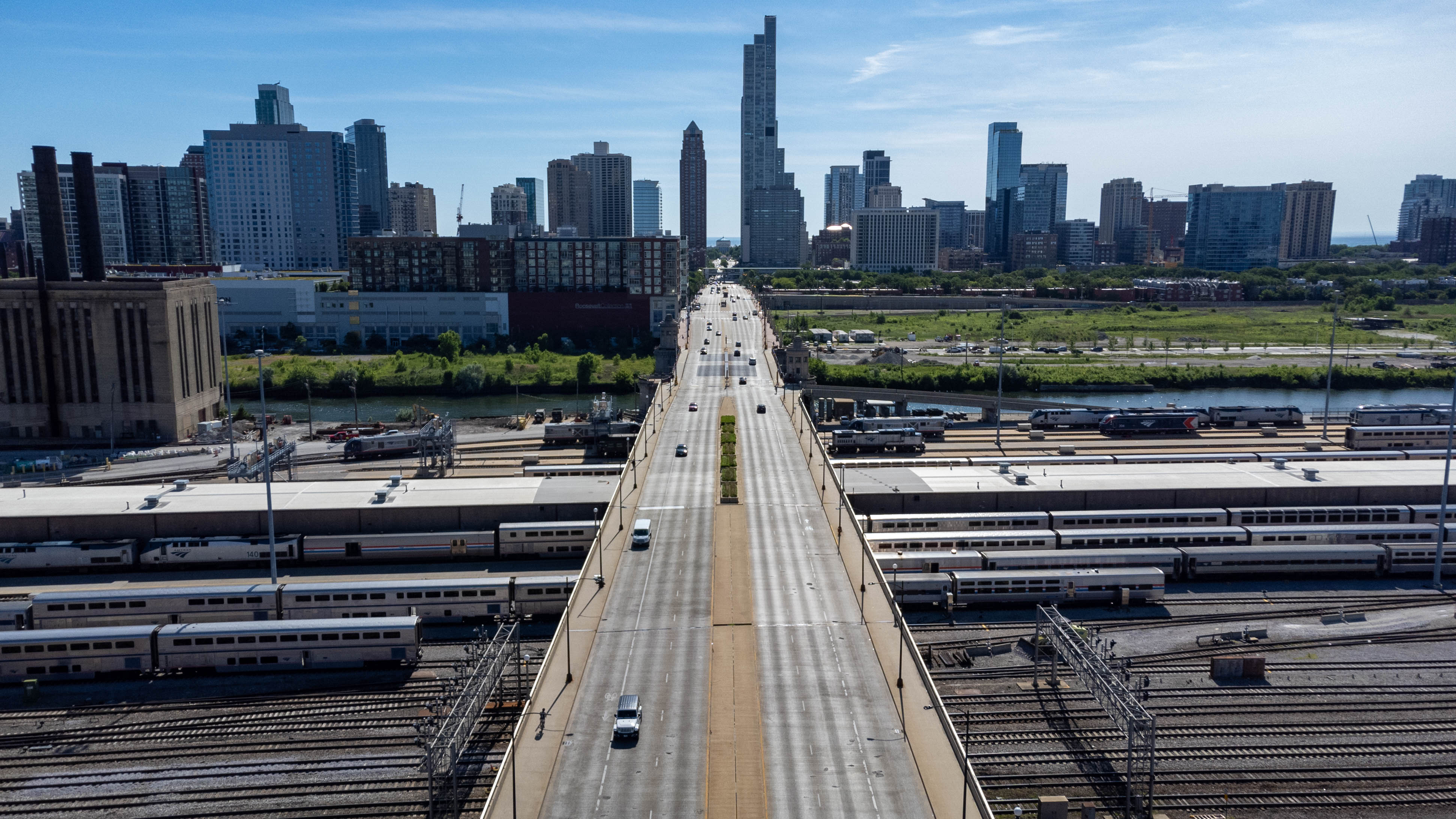
Roosevelt Road looking east towards the bridge in 2022

In Grant Park (for which it serves as the southern boundary west of Lake Shore Drive), it is named Roosevelt Drive. The road begins at Lake Shore Drive and heads west, forming the southern boundary of the Chicago Loop. The area between Clark Street (100 W) and Jefferson Street (600 W) is a fast-growing commercial district, mostly home to large chain stores, including Best Buy, The Home Depot, Staples, Whole Foods Market and Target. This area used to be and remains to a lesser extent, a major fabric retail area. The famous Maxwell Street Market can be found just south of Roosevelt at Canal Street (500 W). Continuing west, it passes the University of Illinois at Chicago's two campuses and St. Ignatius College Preparatory School between Halsted Street and Damen Avenue. It also passes Douglass Park at California Avenue. Once past Mannheim Road it becomes Illinois Route 38.

== Transportation ==
Among the few Chicago Transit Authority bus routes, Roosevelt Road is primarily served by 12 Roosevelt, which runs from the Central Station development to a bus terminal at Central Avenue/Harrison Street in Columbus Park. This was an electric trolley bus line from May 1953 until January 1973.

In the suburbs, Roosevelt Road is also served by a few Pace bus routes. 301 Roosevelt Road is a Pace bus route that runs from Wheaton station on Metra's Union Pacific West Line (from the new DuPage County Courthouse further west under limited service) to Forest Park station on the Blue Line. Aside from the bus route's termini, the route deviates from Roosevelt Road to serve Oakbrook Center and the Hillside Park-n-Ride near Darmstadt Road/Wolf Road. 305 East Roosevelt Road is another Pace bus route that runs from Forest Park station to Cicero station, both of which are on the Blue Line; this route parallels the Blue Line. 308 Medical Center runs along Roosevelt Road to connect from Forest Park station to Hines VA Hospital and Loyola University Medical Center.

The Chicago 'L' Roosevelt station is a stop and transfer point on the Red, Green and Orange lines. The former Roosevelt Road station on the Metra Electric District has been replaced with Museum Campus/11th Street station.

== Major intersections ==
County	Location	mi	km	Destinations	Notes
Kane	Geneva			IL 38 west (East State Street)	Continuation beyond Kautz Road
Kane–DuPage county line	Geneva–West Chicago line	0.0	0.0	Kautz Road	Western terminus
DuPage	West Chicago	1.1	1.8	CR 15 north (Kress Road)	
DuPage	West Chicago	1.6	2.6	CR 21 south (Fabyan Parkway)	
DuPage	West Chicago	3.9	6.3	To IL 59 (Neltnor Boulevard)	Interchange
DuPage	Winfield–Wheaton line	5.7	9.2	CR 13 south (Winfield Road)	
DuPage	Wheaton	6.6	10.6	CR 43 north (County Farm Road)	
DuPage	Wheaton	8.5	13.7	CR 23 south (Naperville Road)	
DuPage	Glen Ellyn	11.1	17.9	To IL 53	
DuPage	Glen Ellyn–Lombard line	11.9	19.2	I-355 Toll (Veterans Memorial Tollway) – Joliet, Northwest Suburbs	
DuPage	Lombard	14.4	23.2	CR 25 south (Meyers Road)	
DuPage	Oakbrook Terrace	15.4	24.8	CR 15 south (Summit Avenue)	
DuPage	Oakbrook Terrace–Elmhurst line	16.1	25.9	IL 83 (Kingery Highway)	Entering eastbound IL 38 via eastbound IL 56
DuPage	Oakbrook Terrace–Elmhurst line	16.4	26.4	IL 56 (Butterfield Road)	Eastbound entrance not accessible for westbound IL 56
DuPage	Oak Brook	18.0	29.0	I-290 / IL 110 (CKC) east (Eisenhower Expressway) – Chicago Loop	Eastbound exit and westbound entrance; exit ramp closes during rush hour
Cook	Hillside	18.2	29.3	I-294 Toll south (Tri-State Tollway) – Indiana	Southbound I-294 entrance and northbound exit only; toll required
Cook	Hillside–Westchester line	20.1	32.3	US 12 / US 20 / US 45 (Mannheim Road) / IL 38 ends	Eastern terminus of IL 38; eastern end of IL 38 overlap
Cook	Maywood–Hines– Forest Park tripoint	22.6	36.4	IL 171 (1st Avenue)	
Cook	Forest Park–Berwyn– Oak Park tripoint	24.1	38.8	IL 43 (Harlem Avenue)	
Cook	Cicero–Chicago line	27.2	43.8	IL 50 (Cicero Avenue)	
Cook	Chicago	30.2	48.6	CR W96 (Western Avenue)	
Cook	Chicago	31.2	50.2	CR W48 south (Ashland Avenue)	
Cook	Chicago	32.3	52.0	I-90 / I-94 (Dan Ryan Expressway, Kennedy Expressway) / I-290 / IL 110 (CKC) west (Eisenhower Expressway)	
Cook	Chicago	33.1	53.3	South Clark Street	Interchange
Cook	Chicago	33.6	54.1	US 41 (South Lake Shore Drive)	Eastern terminus
1.000 mi = 1.609 km; 1.000 km = 0.621 mi: Concurrency terminus; Incomplete access
