= Illinois Route 31 =

State highway in northeastern Illinois, US

Illinois Route 31
- IL 31 highlighted in red

Route information
- Maintained by IDOT
- Length: 58.41 mi (94.00 km)
- Existed: 1937–present

Major junctions
- South end: US 34 in Oswego
- US 30 in Montgomery; I-88 Toll / IL 56 Toll / IL 110 (CKC) in North Aurora; US 20 in Elgin; I-90 Toll in Elgin; US 14 in Crystal Lake
- North end: US 12 in Richmond

Location
- Country: United States
- State: Illinois
- Counties: Kendall, Kane, McHenry

Highway system
- Illinois State Highway System; Interstate; US; State; Tollways; Scenic
← US 30	→ IL 32
← IL 394	US 430	→ US 460

Illinois Route 31 (IL 31) is a 58.41-mile-long (94.00 km) north–south state highway in northeastern Illinois, United States. It travels from U.S. Route 34 (US 34) in Oswego north to US 12, near the Wisconsin state line, just south of Richmond.

== Route description ==
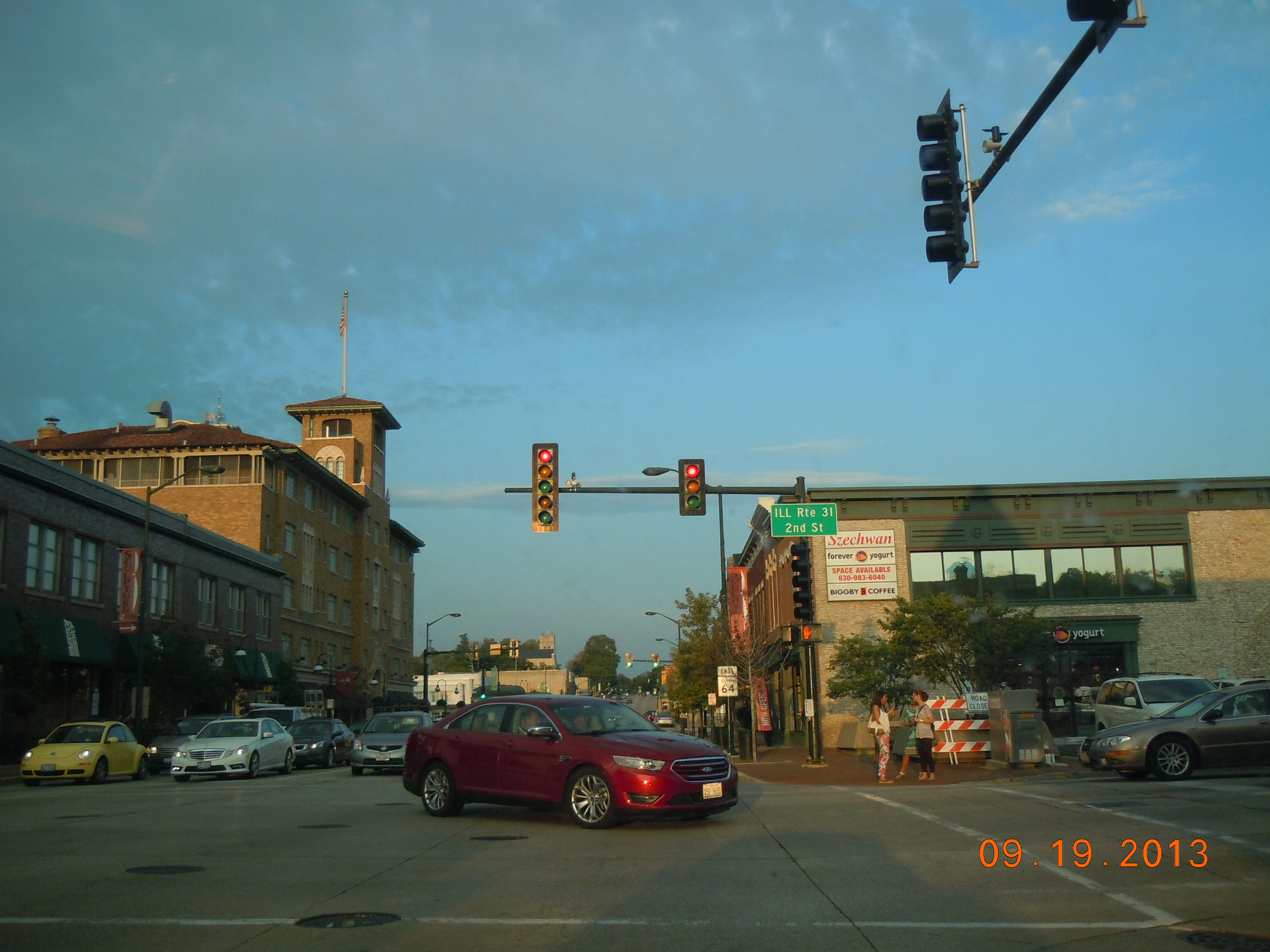
IL 31 at the junction with IL 64 at Saint Charles in 2013

IL 31 follows the Fox River along the western bank. It parallels IL 25, which travels along the eastern bank of the Fox River. It travels concurrent with IL 120 in McHenry.

IL 31 is called Richmond Road north of IL 120 and Front Street south of IL 120 in McHenry, Main Street in Algonquin, Western Avenue in Carpentersville, Eighth Street in West Dundee, State Street in Elgin, La Fox Street in South Elgin, Second Street in St. Charles, First Street in Geneva, Batavia Avenue in Batavia, Lincolnway Street in North Aurora, Lake Street (Southbound) and River Street (Northbound) in Aurora, and Lake Street in Montgomery. It is also, along with IL 25, signed as part of the Fox River Valley area. IL 31 between Aurora and Geneva was considered part of the Lincoln Highway transcontinental route.

The Western Algonquin Bypass was completed in 2014 and redirects traffic around downtown Algonquin.

== History ==
SBI Route 31 traveled from Quincy to Canton along various routes. This was dropped in 1935 and was replaced with US 24. In 1937, it was reapplied along other routes on its modern routing. There have been no changes to the routing since.

=== U.S. Route 430 ===
U.S. Route 430
- Location: Aurora–Crystal Lake
- Existed: 1926–1935

U.S. Route 430 (US 430) was commissioned from 1926 to 1935 in the U.S. state of Illinois, and traveled from Aurora to Crystal Lake. It traveled concurrently with US 30 from Aurora to Geneva at present-day IL 38. In 1934, US 430 was removed north of West Dundee after US 14 was formed. In 1935, US 430 was decommissioned after US 330 was extended north from Geneva to West Dundee. The northern extension was later removed in 1937 in favor of IL 31 and the western extension of US 330 to Dixon.

== Future ==
=== McHenry ===
The intersection of IL 31 and IL 120 is now the most congested intersection in McHenry County.

IDOT is currently in Phase 1 of a planned widening of IL 31 from IL 176 in Crystal Lake to IL 120 in McHenry.

A bypass of McHenry continues to appear in documents planning for a Metra station at Prairie Grove, that include an interchange with the existing IL 31 alignment and the proposed west McHenry bypass alignment to the north of Gracy Road.

The west McHenry bypass was originally planned to travel over undeveloped farm lands from north of IL 31 and Gracy Road to IL 120 and Ringwood Road. The corridor was planned to be protected from development in the mid-1990s, but because of a lack of funding, the corridor was never protected from development and has since been developed.

== Major intersections ==
County	Location	mi	km	Destinations	Notes
Kendall	Oswego	0.0	0.0	US 34 (Washington Street, Walter Payton Memorial Highway)	Southern terminus of IL 31
Kane	Montgomery	2.8	4.5	US 30 – Joliet, Sugar Grove	Interchange
Kane	Aurora	5.6	9.0	Lincoln Highway east (Benton Street)	Southern end of Lincoln Highway concurrency
Kane	North Aurora	8.6	13.8	I-88 Toll / IL 56 Toll west / IL 110 (CKC) (Ronald Reagan Memorial Tollway) – DeKalb, Chicago	Southern end of IL 56 concurrency; I-88 exit 117
Kane	North Aurora	9.4	15.1	IL 56 east (West State Street)	Northern end of IL 56 concurrency
Kane	North Aurora	10.3	16.6	CR 71 west (Mooseheart Road)	
Kane	Batavia	13.7	22.0	CR 8 (Fabyan Parkway)	
Kane	Geneva	15.4	24.8	IL 38 (State Street) / Lincoln Highway west	
Kane	St. Charles	17.4	28.0	IL 64 (Main Street)	
Kane	Elgin	26.4	42.5	US 20 (Elgin Bypass, Dr. Martin Luther King Jr. Memorial Highway, Grant Highway) – Rockford, Chicago	Interchange
Kane	Elgin	29.7	47.8	I-90 Toll (Jane Addams Memorial Tollway) – Chicago, Rockford, Wisconsin	I-90 exit 54; cloverleaf interchange
Kane	West Dundee	31.9	51.3	IL 72 (Higgins Road, Main Street)	
McHenry	Algonquin	37.0	59.5	IL 62 east / CR A48 west (Algonquin Road)	Western terminus of IL 62; Interchange
McHenry	Crystal Lake			CR A45 west (James R Rakow Road, Central Park Drive)	Eastern terminus of McHenry CR A45
McHenry	Crystal Lake	41.2	66.3	US 14 (Northwest Highway, Ronald Reagan Highway)	Interchange
McHenry	Crystal Lake	42.8	68.9	IL 176 (Terra Cotta Avenue)	
McHenry	McHenry	49.5	79.7	IL 120 west (Elm Street)	Western end of IL 120 concurrency
McHenry	McHenry	49.9	80.3	IL 120 east (Elm Street)	Eastern end of IL 120 concurrency
McHenry	Richmond	57.9	93.2	US 12	
1.000 mi = 1.609 km; 1.000 km = 0.621 mi: Concurrency terminus
