= North Aurora, Illinois =

- Village
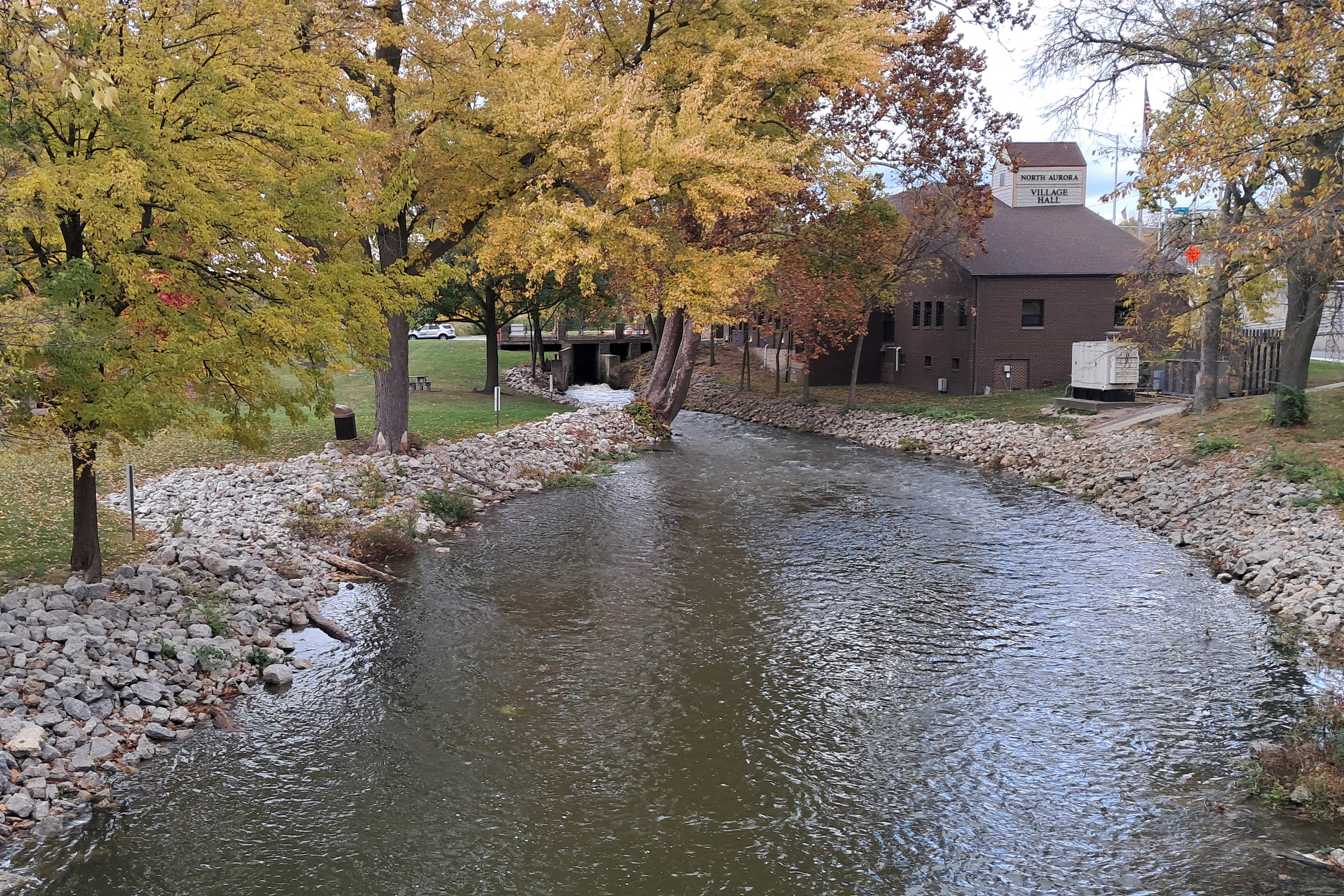
- North Aurora Riverfront Park and Village Hall

- Flag Logo
- Etymology: Location relative to Aurora, Illinois
- Location of North Aurora in Kane County, Illinois
- Coordinates: 41°48′31″N 88°20′30″W
- Country: United States
- State: Illinois
- County: Kane
- Townships: Aurora, Batavia, Blackberry, Sugar Grove
- Founded: 1834
- Named: Prior to 1880 US Census
- Incorporated: 1905

Government
  - Type: Trustee/Administrator
  - Body: Village Board
  - Village Mayor: Mark Gaffino

Area
  - Total: 7.81 sq mi (20.22 km^{2})
  - Land: 7.56 sq mi (19.57 km^{2})
  - Water: 0.25 sq mi (0.65 km^{2})
- Elevation: 709 ft (216 m)

Population (2020)
  - Total: 18,261
  - Density: 2,416.4/sq mi (932.99/km^{2})
- Time zone: UTC-6 (CST)
  - Summer (DST): UTC-5 (CDT)
- ZIP Code: 60524, 60542
- Area codes: 630 and 331
- FIPS code: 17-53442
- GNIS feature ID: 2399508
- Website: www.northaurora.org

North Aurora is a village in Kane County, Illinois, United States, and a suburb of Aurora. Per the 2020 census, the population was 18,261. North Aurora maintains its own public library district, fire district, and police department, but public spaces and parks are managed by the neighboring Fox Valley Park District.

== History ==
In its early history, North Aurora was known as "Schneider's Mill" or "Schneider's Crossing" after John Peter Schneider, a German immigrant who established a mill and dam on the Fox River after moving to the area in 1834. Schneider Elementary School, on the east side of the Fox River, is named after him.

North Aurora was named due to its location north of Aurora, Illinois. The 1880 US Census was the first federal census to use the place-name "Village of North Aurora". It was formally incorporated in 1905.

== Geography ==
North Aurora is located in southeastern Kane County. It is bordered to the south and east by the city of Aurora and to the north by the city of Batavia. Interstate 88 runs along the southern boundary of the village, with access from Exits 114 and 117. The highway leads east 23 miles (37 km) to Hillside in the Chicago suburbs and west 117 miles (188 km) to the Quad Cities. Downtown Chicago is 38 miles (61 km) east of North Aurora.

According to the 2021 census gazetteer files, North Aurora has a total area of 7.81 square miles (20.23 km^{2}), of which 7.56 square miles (19.58 km^{2}) (or 96.80%) is land and 0.25 square miles (0.65 km^{2}) (or 3.20%) is water. The Fox River runs north–south through the village.

== Demographics ==
Historical population
Census	Pop.	Note	%±
1910	352		—
1920	458		30.1%
1930	682		48.9%
1940	772		13.2%
1950	921		19.3%
1960	2,088		126.7%
1970	4,833		131.5%
1980	5,205		7.7%
1990	5,940		14.1%
2000	10,585		78.2%
2010	16,760		58.3%
2020	18,261		9.0%
U.S. Decennial Census; 2010 2020

=== Racial and ethnic composition ===
North Aurora village, Illinois – Racial and ethnic composition Note: the US Census treats Hispanic/Latino as an ethnic category. This table excludes Latinos from the racial categories and assigns them to a separate category. Hispanics/Latinos may be of any race.
Race / Ethnicity (NH = Non-Hispanic)	Pop 2000	Pop 2010	Pop 2020	% 2000	% 2010	% 2020
White alone (NH)	8,671	12,285	12,191	81.92%	73.30%	66.76%
Black or African American alone (NH)	464	836	1,010	4.38%	4.99%	5.53%
Native American or Alaska Native alone (NH)	16	16	11	0.15%	0.10%	0.06%
Asian alone (NH)	269	804	910	2.54%	4.80%	4.98%
Native Hawaiian or Pacific Islander alone (NH)	2	4	8	0.02%	0.02%	0.04%
Other race alone (NH)	16	12	48	0.15%	0.07%	0.26%
Mixed race or Multiracial (NH)	122	289	577	1.15%	1.72%	3.16%
Hispanic or Latino (any race)	1,025	2,514	3,506	9.68%	15.00%	19.20%
Total	10,585	16,760	18,261	100.00%	100.00%	100.00%

=== 2020 census ===
As of the 2020 census, there were 18,261 people, 6,945 households, and 4,432 families residing in the village. The population density was 2,339.05 inhabitants per square mile (903.11/km^{2}).

The median age was 41.7 years. 20.6% of residents were under the age of 18 and 16.5% of residents were 65 years of age or older. For every 100 females there were 94.9 males, and for every 100 females age 18 and over there were 93.0 males age 18 and over.

100.0% of residents lived in urban areas, while 0.0% lived in rural areas.

Of all households, 30.1% had children under the age of 18 living in them. Of all households, 53.9% were married-couple households, 16.3% were households with a male householder and no spouse or partner present, and 23.1% were households with a female householder and no spouse or partner present. About 26.2% of all households were made up of individuals and 10.3% had someone living alone who was 65 years of age or older. The average household size was 3.33 and the average family size was 2.64.

There were 7,282 housing units, of which 4.6% were vacant. The homeowner vacancy rate was 1.4% and the rental vacancy rate was 7.9%.

=== Income and poverty ===
The median income for a household in the village was $90,315, and the median income for a family was $107,163. Males had a median income of $61,060 versus $41,643 for females. The per capita income for the village was $40,697. About 2.6% of families and 4.7% of the population were below the poverty line, including 4.1% of those under age 18 and 7.9% of those age 65 or over.

== Media ==
Waubonsee Community College runs Channel 99 WCC ETV, an educational television station

== Public services ==
=== Schools ===
School-age children in North Aurora attend five public schools in the West Aurora Public School District 129, regardless of which side of the river they live on, with the exception of a few dozen homes in the far northeastern section of the village, in which the children attend Batavia School District 101. North Aurora's own district was absorbed into its neighbor, Aurora, in the early 1960s.

=== Police ===
The village has 28 police officers with one chief and two deputy chiefs. After decades of sharing the same space as the village hall, the village constructed a new police headquarters at 200 S Lincolnway Street (IL Rt 31) in 2010. While an independent entity, there is some limited dependency on the Aurora Police Department; for example, calling the North Aurora police when the front desk is unattended will result in the call being answered by the Aurora Police Department 911 Center.

=== Fire department ===
The North Aurora Fire Protection District covers North Aurora. Station #1 opened in 1963 at the corner of State and Monroe and Station #2 opened on March 16, 2007, at 2201 Tanner Road. Village Ordinance #21 created and chartered North Aurora Village Fire Department in 1908 as a volunteer service. On July 7, 1958, the department was renamed the North Aurora and Countryside Fire Protection District to cover areas outside of the village limits. On November 1, 1993, the district hired a fire chief as its first full-time employee and a month later hired two full-time firefighters.

=== Transportation ===
Pace provides bus service on multiple routes connecting North Aurora to Aurora and other destinations.

North Aurora is served by the old CB&Q line between Aurora and West Chicago, the oldest line on the BNSF system.
