= Frank E. Bauer Bridge =

- Coordinates: 42°20′18.3″N 89°3′58.1″W
- Carries: Four lanes of the Bauer Parkway
- Crosses: Rock River
- Locale: Rockford, IL, Machesney Park, IL
- Maintained by: Winnebago County, IL
- ID number: 000101308829564

Characteristics
- Design: Post-tensioned concrete girder bridge
- Total length: 302.4 metres (0.2 mi)
- Width: 17.1 metres (56.1 ft)
- Clearance below: 5.4 metres (17.7 ft)

History
- Opened: 1993

Statistics
- Daily traffic: 4400
- Toll: none formerly US$0.50 each way

The Frank E. Bauer Bridge is a 0.19 mile (0.31 km) former toll bridge that traverses the Rock River in Machesney Park, Illinois. It was one of four toll bridges in the state of Illinois. The bridge consists of four lanes, a median and shoulders, as well as a sidewalk which was not tolled. It connects Illinois Route 2 north of Rockford, Illinois with commercial areas of Machesney Park and Illinois Route 251 via the Bauer Parkway and Harlem Road (Winnebago County Highway 25).

The bridge opened in 1993. As of 2006, the toll for all vehicles was 50 cents per vehicle, payable only in coins or tokens. I-Pass, the Illinois State Toll Highway Authority's electronic toll collection system, was not accepted due to the large upfront costs of installing I-PASS at the bridge. The Bauer Bridge was tolled to pay for bonds issued for its construction, scheduled to be repaid by 2013. Toll collection ceased on April 1, 2013.
