= Illinois Tollway oasis =

Rest areas on top of a highway

Existing oases in blue; closed/demolished oases in gray

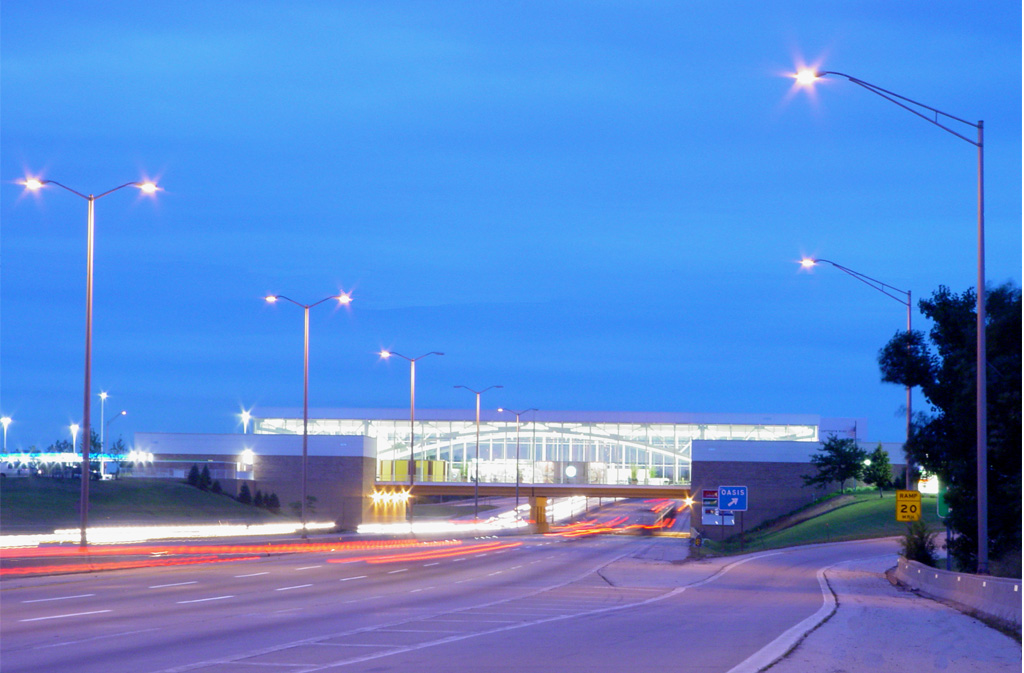
The former O'Hare Oasis

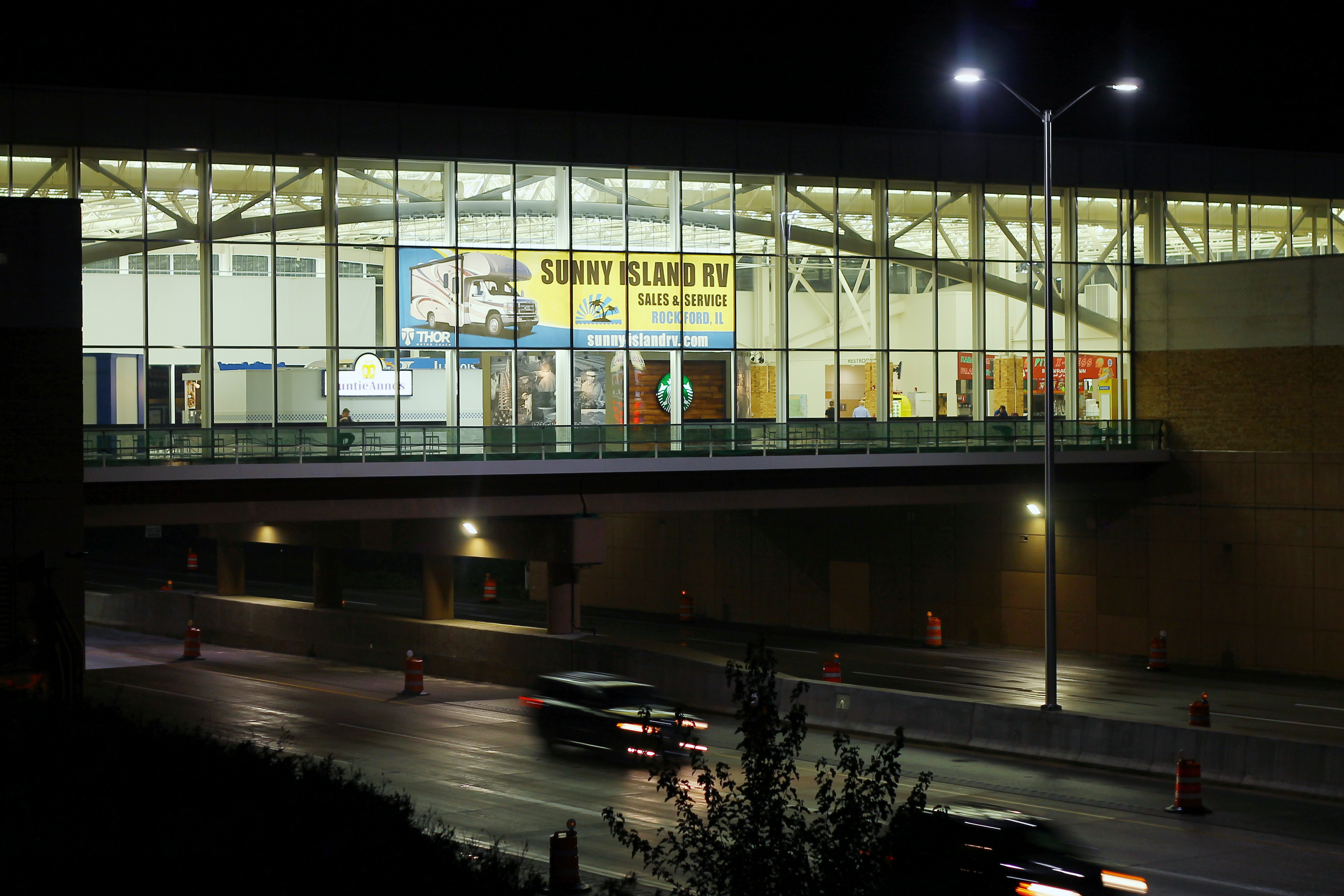
The Belvidere Oasis

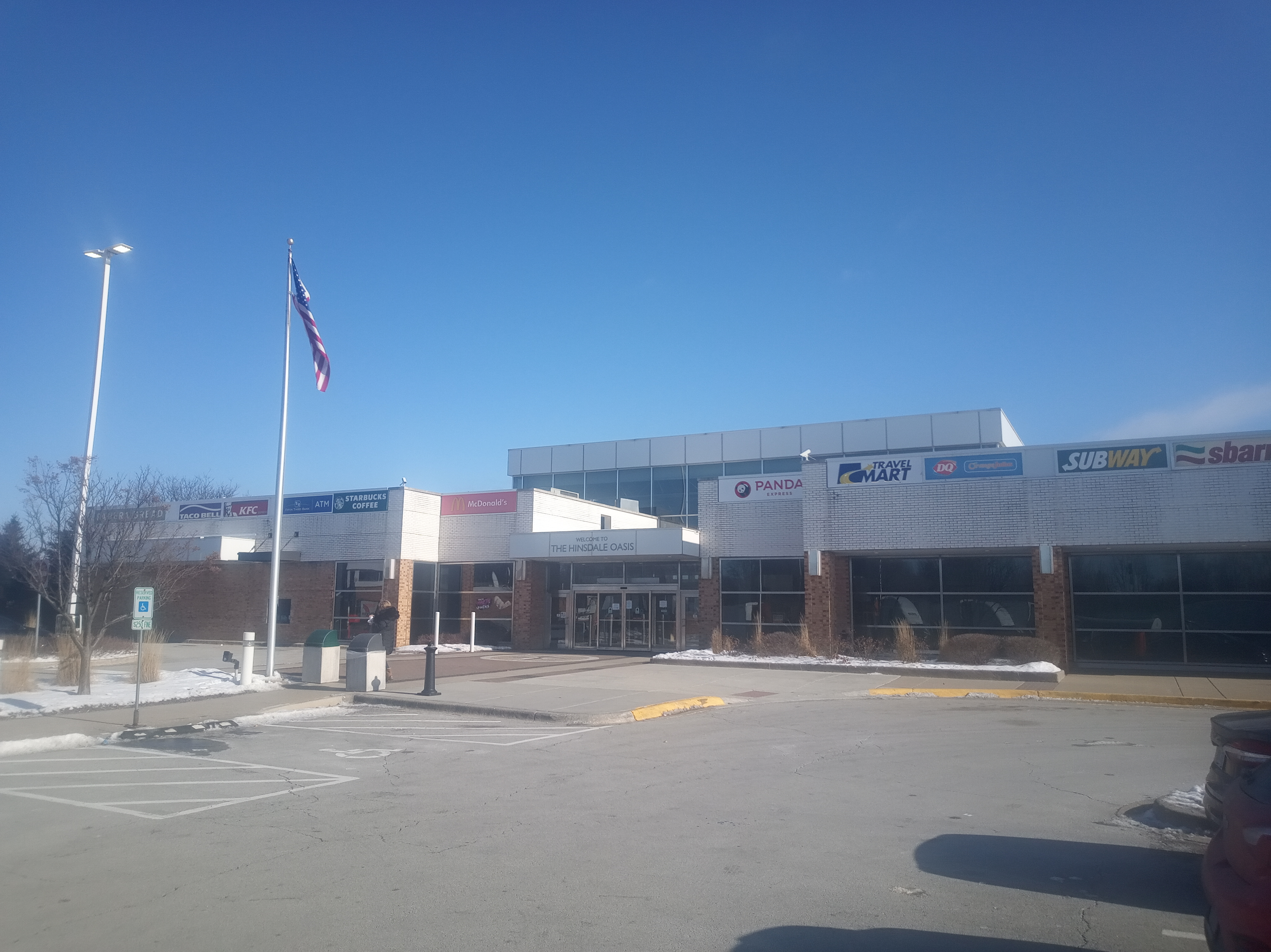
The former Hinsdale Oasis building

An Illinois Tollway oasis is a type of commercialized rest area built on bridges over the Interstate Highways that are part of the Illinois Tollway system in northern Illinois, United States, accessible to people traveling in both directions. The four (formerly seven) oases offer food and gasoline vendors and are found in the Chicago Metropolitan Area, DeKalb (does not have part over expressway), and Belvidere. Although the oases date back to the original tollway construction in 1958, they were redeveloped in 2003–2005 by Wilton Partners, a private developer. The redevelopment of the oases has been the focal point of alleged political corruption. The four oases are administered by a court-appointed manager following default of Wilton Partners.

== Description and current status ==
As is typical for rest stops on toll highways, these areas are full service, or "commercialized", as a result of concessions awarded by the Illinois State Toll Highway Authority (ISTHA). (Note: Federal regulations forbid commercial development at rest areas on toll-free Interstates; only toll roads can offer services to the public. The Wendell H. Ford Western Kentucky Parkway in Kentucky and the Connecticut Turnpike have service areas that have been grandfathered because they were built when their associated highways were toll roads. Some rest areas along the New York State Thruway and almost all along the New Jersey Turnpike, Indiana Toll Road, Ohio Turnpike, Florida's Turnpike, Turnpikes of Oklahoma and Pennsylvania Turnpike are also commercialized to at least some extent.)

In 2011, over 11.8 million people visited the seven oases that existed at that time. These facilities have gas stations (Mobil) with 24-hour automated car washes, fast food restaurants (McDonald's, Panda Express, Subway, etc.) and other various shops (such as Krispy Kreme, Starbucks, Coleman Distributors, and TravelMart). Oases also have automatic teller machines. Six of the oases are built as a bridge-restaurant, directly over the Interstate Highway they service. The oasis in DeKalb is the only exception, with the facility located along the southern (eastbound) side of Interstate 88 (I-88), and a vehicle overpass allows westbound traffic to access a parking lot and gas station along one side of the facility. All the oases provide free WiFi access for visitors. The oases have a drive-thru lane for the McDonald's. All oases, except for the Hinsdale and DeKalb oases, have Tollway Customer Service Centers, where I-Pass toll transponders are sold and serviced. The oases have a total of 110,000 square feet (10,000 m^{2}) of retail space. As of 2009, the oases were 45 percent to 65 percent vacant. ISTHA has established a special task force to study the oases' future.

The Illinois Department of Transportation (IDOT) proposed a route for a new limited access highway on the west side of O'Hare Airport which will connect with the Jane Addams Tollway at the site of the Des Plaines Oasis. The oasis there was demolished for the new road. As such, the Des Plaines Oasis was closed on March 16, 2014, to allow vendor contents to be removed and demolition to proceed.

ISTHA announced plans to widen the Tri-State Tollway, which resulted in the demolitions of the pavilions of the O'Hare Oasis in 2018 and the Hinsdale Oasis in 2021.

== History ==
The five original oases were built in conjunction with the original tollway construction in 1959. They featured Standard Oil (Amoco) gas stations and Fred Harvey restaurants, and were something of a novelty in the region—becoming destinations in and of themselves for driving customers. Because the Illinois State Toll Highway Commission (ISTHC) did not have the money to build the oases, they were built and paid for by the American Oil Company, which operated the Amoco/Standard Oil service stations and also sub-leased the restaurant areas to the Fred Harvey restaurant chain. The title of the oases reverted to the ISTHC after the original 25-year operating contract ended. During this initial operating period the state received 2.51 cents for each gallon of gas sold as well as 10% of the restaurant profits.

The Lincoln Oasis was added in 1968 and was different from the previous five oases in that it was an all-steel building designed by architect David Haid, a one-time student and employee of architect Ludwig Mies van der Rohe. The DeKalb Oasis opened in 1975 and was different from the prior six in that it was the only one of seven oases to not be constructed over the tollway. In the mid-1970s, Howard Johnson's took over the restaurants. One of the oases made an appearance on the silver screen when Carrie Fisher attacks The Blues Brothers at the Des Plaines Oasis in the 1980 film. In 1984, individual fast food restaurants took over from Howard Johnson, with the oases on I-90 and I-88 being run by McDonald's and the oases on I-294 alternating between Wendy's and Burger King.

From 2003 to 2005, an extensive renovation program of the oases was completed, which involved demolishing the old structures down to the bridge deck and replacing them with new buildings. Where in the previous buildings the views of the highways were blocked by the vendor restaurants, in the new buildings large expanses of glass are used to create a sense of openness, and to give patrons better views of the highway. The steel truss design also has greater roof height (nearly 30 feet or 9.1 metres) than the old buildings, which increased visibility for the oases. The architects for the project were Cordogan Clark & Associates. The gas stations were rebuilt with canopies to cover the gas pumps. The oases were redeveloped at no cost to the ISTHA or the Illinois taxpayers. The $95 million investment was provided by Wilton Partners of Los Angeles, California and ExxonMobil in exchange for a 25-year lease. Under the lease, Wilton would pay ISTHA a percentage of vendor sales with a minimum of $750,000 per year.

The lease agreements between ISTHA, Wilton Partners, and various vendors have come under investigation by U.S. Attorney Patrick Fitzgerald. This investigation, reported on December 30, 2005, will determine if a conflict of interest existed between the lessees and a political fund-raiser for Governor Rod Blagojevich, Antoin Rezko DuPage County State's Attorney Joe Birkett had also requested documents pertaining to these leases earlier in 2005. According to the Chicago Tribune, the Subway restaurants in two oases are managed by the nephew of Rezko, a controversial political fundraiser. In response, tollway spokesmen noted that Wilton Partners was selected during the administration of Governor George Ryan and that the lease gives Wilton discretion to select the individual vendors.

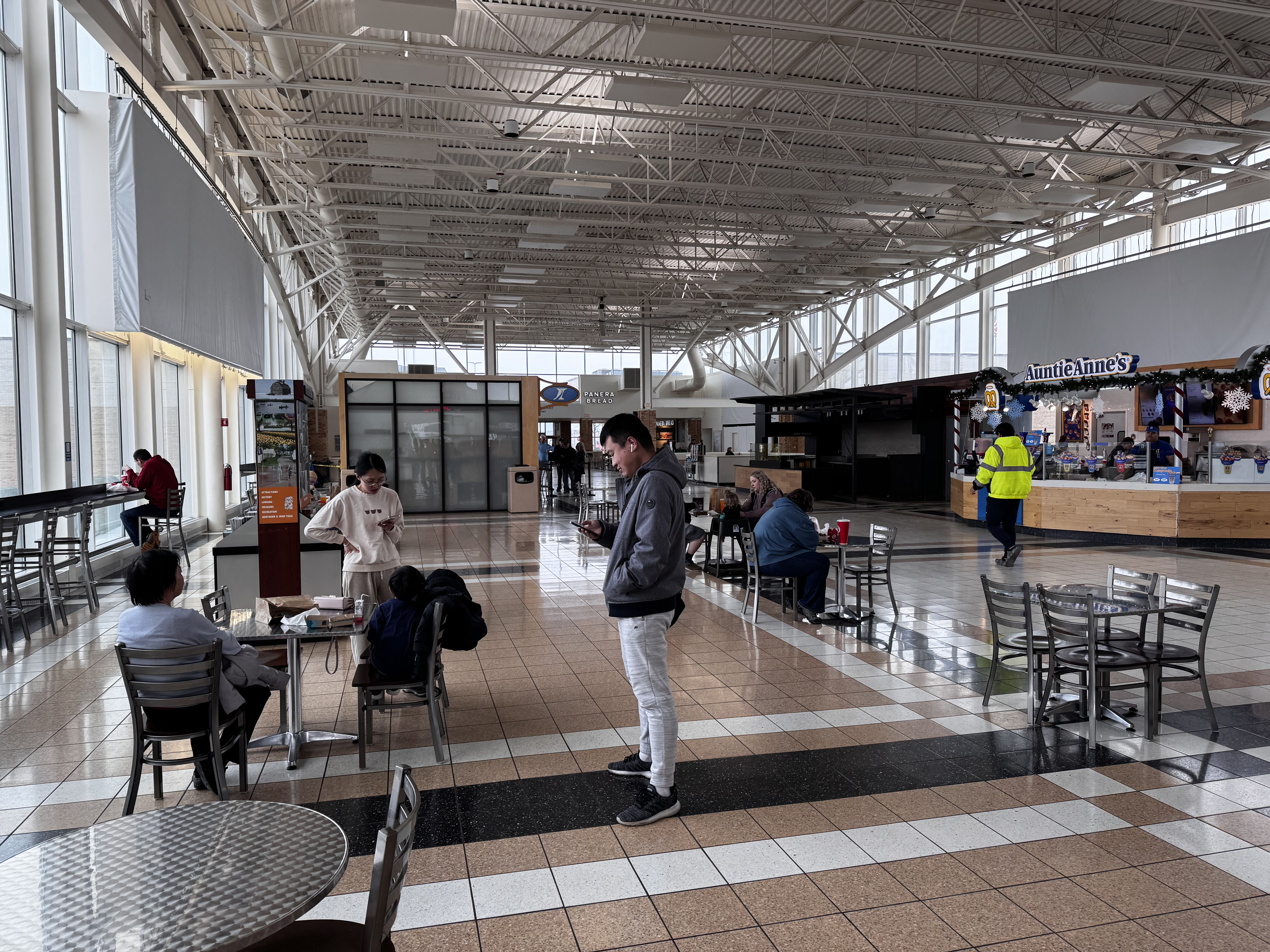
The interior of the Belvidere location

News accounts quoted businessmen who claimed that Jay Wilton, the president of Wilton Partners, encouraged them to donate funds to Blagojevich's 2003 gubernatorial campaign. In December 2003, Wilton Partners reportedly gave Rezko's Panda Express franchise a 50% reduction in its rent at the oases. In January 2007, Wilton stopped making required payments to ISTHA for the oases, and by February 2008, when the back rent grew to $1.4 million, Wilton and ISTHA entered into settlement negotiations. However, in July 2008, Illinois Attorney General Lisa Madigan rejected a proposed settlement where ISTHA would forgo the $1.4 million in back rent in exchange for Wilton dropping a claim of $4.7 million for lost business due to tollway construction. In early 2009, Wilton Partners' lender, iStar Financial, foreclosed on the oases. Subsequently, the court appointed U.S. Equities, a Chicago firm, to manage the oases pending the outcome of the foreclosure. Further, another food vendor operating in all seven oases who donated to Blagojevich has also received press attention for failure to pay sales taxes and state unemployment insurance. In 2010, SFI Chicago Tollway LLC became the oases' operator. In 2012, SFI paid the Tollway $813,000 for a long-term lease to operate all seven oases, excluding the fuel stations and convenience stores operated by 7-Eleven.

On December 9, 2009, a truck driver standing at the gas station parking lot of the Belvidere oasis was killed when debris thrown by an explosion at an adjacent factory struck him. The six-story factory building was hundreds of feet away from the oasis.

On September 26, 2013, ISTHA announced that the Des Plaines Oasis over the Jane Addams Tollway would be closed in April 2014. The structure was demolished to make way for the widening of the toll road and the O'Hare West Bypass.

Additionally, ISTHA rebuilt and widened the Central Tri-State Tollway (I-294) to five lanes in each direction with a wide shoulder that could be used as a "flex lane". Under these plans, the Hinsdale and O'Hare Oasis were demolished in order to make room for the wider road. On September 5, 2018, the O'Hare oasis closed to prepare for the widening project. The Hinsdale Oasis closed on September 13, 2021, to also prepare for the widening project.

== Locations ==
The oases are spread along the tollway system, with each oasis serving traffic in both directions. The Lincoln Oasis is strategically placed to serve east-west traffic crossing Illinois on I-80. The DeKalb Oasis serves traffic crossing Illinois on I-88, and the Belvidere Oasis serves traffic travelling between Madison, Wisconsin, and Chicago on I-90. The O'Hare Oasis also benefited from serving traffic, including returning rental cars, associated with O'Hare Airport. The only tollways that do not have any oases are the Veterans Memorial Tollway (I-355) and the Elgin–O'Hare Tollway (Illinois Route 390), which were designed to serve local traffic and opened decades after the other tollways and oases were built. On March 16, 2014, the Des Plaines Oasis closed as part of construction on the I-490. On September 5, 2018, the O'Hare Oasis closed to make way for Tri State Tollway widening. The Hinsdale Oasis closed on September 13, 2021, also to make way for the Tri State Tollway widening.

List of Illinois Tollway oases
Name	Status	Route	Mile	km	Location	Coordinates
Belvidere Oasis	Open	I-90 (Jane Addams Memorial Tollway)	24.5	39.4	Just east of Rockford in Belvidere	42.23343°N 88.834567°W
DeKalb Oasis	Open	I-88 (Ronald Reagan Memorial Tollway)	93	150	Near DeKalb	41.900178°N 88.739188°W
Des Plaines Oasis	Closed	I-90 (Jane Addams Memorial Tollway)	4.5	7.2	Formerly at Des Plaines	42.014697°N 87.926464°W
Hinsdale Oasis	Closed	I-294 (Tri-State Tollway)	25	40	Formerly at Hinsdale	41.783497°N 87.90785°W
Lake Forest Oasis	Open	I-94 (Tri-State Tollway)	18	29	Near Lake Forest	42.252952°N 87.901346°W
Chicago Southland Lincoln Oasis	Open	I-80/I-294 (Tri-State Tollway)	1	1.6	Near South Holland	41.57869°N 87.599052°W
O'Hare Oasis	Closed	I-294 (Tri-State Tollway)	38	61	Formerly At Schiller Park	41.95056°N 87.882477°W
