= J. W. Clark =

J.W. Clark may refer to:

- James West Clark (1779–1843), a United States Representative from North Carolina
- James Waddey Clark (1877–1939), a Justice of the Oklahoma Supreme Court
- John Willis Clark (1833–1910), English academic and antiquarian
- John W. Clark (architect), American architect
- Joseph Walter "Joe" Clark (1890–1960), an English professional footballer
