= Cordogan Clark & Associates =

US architecture, planning and engineering firm

Cordogan Clark & Associates (CCA) is an architecture, planning and engineering firm based in Illinois with offices in Chicago, Aurora, Illinois, and Lafayette, Indiana. The firm was founded in 1951 by Louis Cordogan. John Cordogan joined the firm in 1981 and in 1984, he and John Clark became founding partners of Cordogan, Clark & Associates. In February 2016, it was announced that Cordogan Clark & Associates merged with Lafayette-based firm Keystone Architecture, Inc.

== Firm history ==
Louis C. Cordogan Architects (1951 - 1984)

- Louis C. Cordogan, Principal (1951 - 1984)
- John G. Cordogan, Principal (1981 - Present)

Cordogan Clark & Associates (1984 - Present)

- John G. Cordogan, Principal (1981 - Present)
- John W. Clark, Principal (1984 - Present)

== Projects ==
The following is an incomplete list:

- John C. Dunham STEM Partnership School, Aurora University, Aurora, Illinois (2014) - LEED Platinum Certification
- 41st and 43rd Street Bridges, Lake Shore Drive, Chicago, Illinois (2002-)
- Timegate Monument Base (with Zhou brothers), Beijing, China (2004-)
- Wuxi Transportation Center, Wuxi, China (2006-)
- Aurora Public Library, Aurora, Illinois (2010-)
- Watterson Towers Renovation, Illinois State University, Normal, Illinois (2010-)
- Cole Hall, Northern Illinois University, DeKalb, Illinois (2012)
- Downtown Campus, Waubonsee Community College, Aurora, Illinois (2011)
- Roquette International, Geneva, Illinois (2011)
- Aurora Police Headquarters, Aurora, Illinois (2010)
- Devon Bank, Wheeling, Illinois (2009)
- Residences at the Grove, Downers Grove, Illinois (2008)
- Paramount Arts Center, Aurora, Illinois (2008)
- Ningbo Industrial Design & Creativity Center, Ningbo, China (2008)
- Franklin Point Riverfront, Chicago, Illinois (2007)
- Westhaven Park Hi Rise, Chicago, Illinois (2007)
- Vaughn Athletic Center, Aurora, Illinois (2007)
- Institute for Collaboration, Aurora University, Aurora, Illinois (2006)
- Illinois State Toll Highway Oases Redevelopment, Illinois (2005)
- Greenman Elementary, Aurora, Illinois (2004)
- Glen Ellyn Public Library, Glen Ellyn, Illinois (1997)
- Heritage Center for the Performing Arts, Alma, Michigan (1993)

== Awards ==
Cordogan, Clark & Associates has been the recipient of a number of awards, including those from the American Institute of Architects, the Precast Concrete Institute and Community Beautification Awards. CCA has also won several national and international design competitions and has been recognized for several sustainable projects, including the Aurora Police Headquarters in Aurora, Illinois and Devon Bank in Wheeling, Illinois, which both received LEED Gold Certification.
