= Illinois Route 390 =

Highway in northeastern Illinois

Illinois Route 390 Toll
- Elgin–O'Hare Tollway
- IL 390 highlighted in red

Route information
- Maintained by ISTHA
- Length: 9.8 mi (15.8 km)
- Existed: October 29, 2013–present

Major junctions
- West end: US 20 in Hanover Park
- IL 19 in Schaumburg; IL 53 in Itasca; I-290 in Itasca
- East end: IL 83 in Bensenville

Location
- Country: United States
- State: Illinois
- Counties: DuPage, Cook

Highway system
- Illinois State Highway System; Interstate; US; State; Tollways; Scenic
← I-355	→ IL 394

Illinois Route 390 (IL 390), previously known as the Elgin–O'Hare Expressway, now known as the Elgin–O'Hare Tollway, is a 9.8-mile (15.8 km) controlled-access toll road in northeastern Illinois. IL 390 currently connects U.S. Route 20 (US 20, Lake Street) in Hanover Park to the interchange with Illinois Route 83 (IL 83) and Thorndale Avenue in Wood Dale. The only other towns it borders are Schaumburg and Roselle. Construction is underway to extend the road from IL 83 to the western edge of O'Hare International Airport.

== Route description ==
IL 390 begins at an interchange with US 20 in Hanover Park and branches off northeastward as a six-lane toll road, traveling over a half-mile-long (0.8 km) bridge over the Metra Milwaukee District West Line tracks, and some wetlands. The highway then enters Cook County from DuPage County and has an interchange with IL 19 (Irving Park Road). At Meacham Road, the highway crosses back south into DuPage County. Continuing east for five miles (8.0 km), IL 390 traverses portions of the suburbs of Schaumburg, Roselle, Medinah, Elk Grove Village, and then has an interchange with IL 53 before a major interchange with I-290 in Itasca. IL 390 continues east for four miles (6.4 km) through Wood Dale, Elk Grove Village (again), and Bensenville, and finally ends at an interchange with IL 83 in Bensenville just short of the west side of O'Hare International Airport. IL 390 was the first route in the state to have all-electronic toll collection, predating the 2021 conversion to all-electronic tolling on all Illinois State Toll Highway Authority roads; tolls can be paid using I-Pass, E-ZPass or toll-by-plate. The mileposts are measured from the planned western terminus in Elgin.

== History ==
Elgin–O'Hare Expressway
- Location: Hanover Park–Itasca
- Length: 5.95 mi (9.58 km)
- Existed: November 2, 1993–October 29, 2013

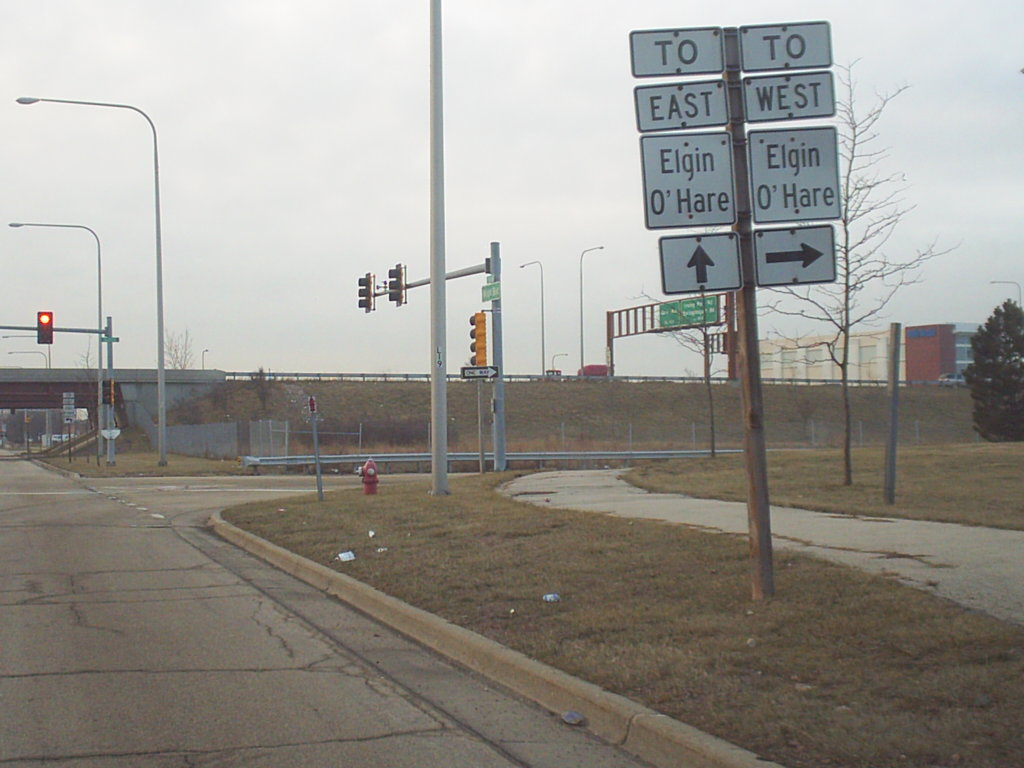
Markers for the Elgin-O'Hare Expressway on Wright Boulevard in Schaumburg

Although the concept of an Elgin–O'Hare Expressway dates back to the 1960s, the highway was not seriously considered until the late 1980s. Around that time, congestion was rapidly increasing on local roads, especially US 20 (Lake Street). Although Lake Street was extensively widened prior to the completion of the highway, initially to Glen Ellyn Road and then to the Roselle-Bloomingdale border nearly ten years later, its capacity was still considered insufficient for the rapidly growing western suburbs. Construction on the highway began around 1991 and was completed two years later. Governor Jim Edgar opened the highway at an afternoon ceremony on November 2, 1993.

When the highway first opened, both of its termini had traffic signals with major arterial roads in the area. This arrangement caused large backups during weekday rush hours. According to the Illinois Department of Transportation (IDOT), average daily traffic counts (in 2003) for IL 390 are 39,600 vehicles for the western two miles (3.2 km) and around 82,000 to 87,000 cars per day for the remainder.

On October 29, 2013, IDOT announced that the highway was re-designated IL 390 at groundbreaking ceremonies for the Elgin–O’Hare Western Access Project. Shortly after, maintenance of the road was transferred to the Illinois State Toll Highway Authority (ISTHA), and toll collection on the existing segment from US 20 in Hanover Park to I-290 in Itasca began in 2016. ISTHA began constructing an eastward extension of IL 390 to a new interchange on the western border of O'Hare International Airport with the planned I-490 connecting I-90 to the north and I-294 to the south. This interchange may also incorporate ramps into a planned western terminal at O'Hare. The official groundbreaking for the expansion took place on October 29, 2013. The first four miles (6.4 km) segment of this extension, opened at a ribbon-cutting ceremony on November 1, 2017, stretching from the interchange with I-290 in Itasca to IL 83 in Bensenville. East of I-290, IL 390 was formerly a four-lane arterial at-grade road known as Thorndale Avenue until its conversion into an extension of IL 390, along with the interchange with I-290. Thorndale Avenue ran from I-290 to York Road near the western border of O'Hare International Airport. After its conversion, the Thorndale Avenue designation was assigned to the new frontage roads along both sides of the eastern extension of IL 390.

== Future ==
The remaining section of IL 390 from IL 83 in Bensenville to the western edge of O'Hare International Airport is currently under construction and is expected to open in 2026. As of 2016, a feasibility study is underway on the western extension of IL 390 from US 20 to North Avenue in Bartlett, as well as changes to US 20 between North Avenue in Bartlett and Shales Parkway in Elgin. However, unlike the original plans, the entire extension is proposed to be an arterial road rather than a limited–access freeway or tollway.

== Exit list ==
County	Location	mi	km	Exit	Destinations	Notes
Cook	Streamwood	1.0	1.6		US 20 (Lake Street)	Proposed at-grade intersection; future western terminus
Cook	Bartlett	2.0	3.2		North Avenue	Proposed at-grade intersection
DuPage	Hanover Park	4.0	6.4		Devon Avenue	Proposed at-grade intersection
DuPage	Hanover Park	5.0	8.0		County Farm Road	Proposed at-grade intersection
DuPage	Hanover Park	6.0	9.7	6	US 20 (Lake Street)	Partially built interchange; current western terminus; future west end of tollway section
DuPage	Hanover Park	6.6	10.6	Lake Street Toll Plaza		
Cook	Schaumburg	7.4	11.9	7B	Gary Avenue	Westbound exit and eastbound entrance
Cook	Schaumburg	7.1– 7.7	11.4– 12.4	7A	IL 19 (Irving Park Road) / Springinsguth Road	Signed as exit 7 eastbound
Cook	Schaumburg	8.3	13.4	8	Wright Boulevard / Rodenburg Road	Westbound exit and eastbound entrance
Cook	Schaumburg	8.8	14.2	Mitchell Boulevard Toll Plaza		
Cook	Roselle	9.4	15.1	9	Roselle Road	Full diamond interchange
Cook	Roselle	10.6	17.1	Plum Grove Road Toll Plaza		
Cook–DuPage county line	Elk Grove Village–Itasca line	11.2	18.0	11	Medinah Road / Meacham Road	
DuPage	Itasca	11.2	18.0	12A	IL 53 (Rohlwing Road)	Eastbound access via exit 11
DuPage	Itasca	12.5	20.1	12	I-290 to I-355 Toll south – Chicago, Rockford	Signed as exits 12B (east) and 12C (west) westbound, exit 12 eastbound; I-290 exit 5
DuPage	Itasca	13.1	21.1		Ketter Drive	Westbound entrance only
DuPage	Itasca	13.1	21.1	Hamilton Lakes Boulevard Toll Plaza		
DuPage	Itasca	13.8	22.2	13	Prospect Avenue	
DuPage	Wood Dale	14.3	23.0	Mittel Drive Toll Plaza		
DuPage	Wood Dale	14.8	23.8	14	Wood Dale Road	
DuPage	Wood Dale	15.3	24.6	Lively Boulevard Toll Plaza		
DuPage	Wood Dale–Bensenville line	15.8	25.4	15	IL 83 (Busse Road)	Eastbound exit and westbound entrance; to become a full-access interchange
DuPage	Bensenville	17.0	27.4	17	I-490 Toll (O'Hare West Bypass) to CR 8 (York Road) – Franklin Park, Des Plaines	Planned eastern terminus; interchange scheduled to open in 2026; to be signed as 17A (north), 17B (south); I-490 exit 3
1.000 mi = 1.609 km; 1.000 km = 0.621 mi: Electronic toll collection; Incomplete access; Unopened
