= Interstate 90 in Illinois =

Section of Interstate Highway in Illinois, United States

Interstate 90
- I-90 highlighted in red

Route information
- Maintained by ISTHA, IDOT, and SCC
- Length: 123.89 mi (199.38 km)
- NHS: Entire route

Major junctions
- West end: I-39 / I-90 at the Wisconsin state line in South Beloit
- I-39 / US 51 in Cherry Valley; I-290 / IL 53 in Rolling Meadows; Future I-490 in Des Plaines; I-294 in Rosemont; I-190 in Chicago; I-94 in Chicago; I-290 / IL 110 (CKC) in Chicago; I-55 in Chicago; I-94 in Chicago
- East end: I-90 / Indiana Toll Road at the Indiana state line in Hammond, IN

Location
- Country: United States
- State: Illinois
- Counties: Winnebago, Boone, McHenry, Kane, Cook

Highway system
- Interstate Highway System; Main; Auxiliary; Suffixed; Business; Future; Illinois State Highway System; Interstate; US; State; Tollways; Scenic
← IL 89	→ IL 90

Interstate 90 (I-90) in the US state of Illinois runs roughly northwest-to-southeast through the northern part of the state. Entering Illinois at the Wisconsin state line in South Beloit, it passes through the Rock River Valley and the suburbs of Rockford, where it turns eastward, heading towards Chicago through farmland west of the Fox River Valley and through medium-density suburbs west of O'Hare International Airport. After entering through Downtown Chicago, I-90 passes through the heart of the industrial southeast side of Chicago before entering Indiana, crossing the Calumet River on the Chicago Skyway toll bridge.

In Illinois, I-90 consists of four major segments, including the Jane Addams Memorial Tollway (prior to 2007, the Northwest Tollway) from South Beloit to O'Hare Airport. Within Chicago, I-90 becomes the Kennedy Expressway from O'Hare to the Jane Byrne Interchange, where it becomes the Dan Ryan Expressway. In the Englewood neighborhood, I-90 splits from the Dan Ryan Expressway to become the Chicago Skyway toll bridge, remaining elevated until it crosses into Indiana. The Jane Addams and Chicago Skyway are toll roads maintained by the Illinois State Toll Highway Authority (ISTHA) and the Skyway Concession Company (SCC), respectively. The remainder of the highway is maintained by the Illinois Department of Transportation (IDOT). The current routing of I-90 in Illinois is 123.89 miles (199.38 km) long.

The Illinois routing of I-90 runs concurrently with two other Interstates, carrying I-39 (and US 51) from the Wisconsin border to an interchange between Rockford and Cherry Valley. In Chicago, I-90 carries I-94 for approximately 2/3 the length of the Kennedy Expressway and the entire length of the Dan Ryan Expressway. I-290 (Dwight D. Eisenhower Expressway) is an auxiliary Interstate Highway that has termini at two major points within I-90.

== Route description ==
=== Winnebago County ===
I-90 enters Illinois concurrently with I-39 in South Beloit (the northernmost city in Illinois) as a six-lane expressway. At 0.3 miles (0.48 km) south of the state line (marked as exit 1, South Beloit), I-39/I-90 has an interchange with Illinois Route 75 (IL 75); the interchange marks the point where US Route 51 (US 51) runs concurrently with I-39 until its southern terminus.

After an interchange northeast of the Rockford suburbs of Rockton and Roscoe, the Jane Addams Memorial Tollway starts with the South Beloit Toll Plaza (the northernmost toll plaza in Illinois). Through eastern Winnebago County, I-39/I-90 continues in nearly a north–south direction towards the eastern edge of Rockford. Before passing through Rock Cut State Park (among the largest in the state), the Interstate has an interchange with IL 173, accessing Machesney Park from the north; built in 2007, the interchange design was influenced by the location of the state park.

I-39/I-90 enters the city of Rockford with an interchange at exit 12 (East Riverside Boulevard), crossing the border between Rockford and Loves Park. Before exiting the county, the highway forms its two largest intersections west of I-290, with exit 15 (State Street), accessing the US 20 business route connecting Rockford and Belvidere. Exit 17, located between Rockford and Cherry Valley, is the point where I-90 splits from I-39 (taking US 51 with it) and forms the approach to the diverging-diamond interchange that starts the US 20 bypass around Rockford (U.S. Grant Highway); approximately three miles (4.8 km) southeast, I-39/US 51 splits again to move towards central Illinois. As the Jane Addams splits from I-39, I-90 takes a sharp change in direction from south to east; this also marks the point where I-90 and US 20 follow nearly parallel routing until their eastern terminus in Massachusetts (though sharing no concurrency).

From exit 17 to its intersection with the Edens Expressway (I-94), the highway is only signed as I-90. Eastward of the interchange, I-90 is fitted with center-mounted lighting. Shortly before entering Boone County, I-90 crosses the Kishwaukee River north of the village of Cherry Valley.

=== Boone, McHenry, and Kane counties ===
Shortly after entering Boone County, I-90 passes under US 20 and forms the southern border of Belvidere. Along with sharing one tolled exit with Cherry Valley (Irene Road), Belvidere has a second tolled exit (Genoa Road) which accesses the eastern terminus of the US 20 business route. In addition to a westbound toll plaza, an Illinois Tollway oasis is located westward of the latter exit (the sole example on I-90). The over-highway design of the oasis houses multiple vendors, allowing tollway travelers the options of resting, eating, and refueling from one location on the highway.

East of Belvidere, I-90 changes its direction from east to southeast. After exiting the Rockford region entirely, its surroundings become substantially rural, with exits spaced farther apart. Entering McHenry County, I-90 has only one exit: a tolled interchange with IL 23 (exit 36) in unincorporated Riley (accessing Marengo and Genoa). To match the westbound Belvidere Toll Plaza, eastbound traffic passes through the Marengo Toll Plaza (approximately a mile eastward of IL 23).

I-90 enters Kane County in Hampshire, forming its third intersection with US 20 (exit 42). Eastward, it crosses IL 47 (exit 47) between Pingree Grove and Huntley. As I-90 passes under IL 72 in Gilberts, the rural surroundings disappear as the highway becomes surrounded by a mix of residential, commercial, and industrial developments (along with large nature preserves). As I-90 approaches the Fox Valley, it enters Elgin (the third-largest city in Illinois to border I-90) with three exits accessing the city. After passing exit 52 (Randall Road), marking the historic western terminus of the Chicago suburbs, I-90 expands from six to eight lanes and gradually turns east as it passes through the Elgin Toll Plaza (both directions) and exit 54 (IL 31). After crossing the Fox River, I-90 passes through exit 56 (IL 25) at the Cook County border.

=== Suburban Cook county ===
After exiting Kane County, I-90 moves uphill as it enters Cook County, heading eastward towards I-290 (Eisenhower Expressway). Prior to its intersection with the Eisenhower, the highway passes through Hoffman Estates (including IL 59) and Schaumburg (each also have a westbound-only interchange). Eastward of the Barrington Road exit, I-90 is fitted with active traffic management gantries. I-290 has its northern terminus with I-90, as it becomes IL 53 north of the tollway.

To the north, the I-290 interchange (exit 68) provides access to many suburbs accessed by both US 12 and US 14. To the south, the Eisenhower provides expressway access to the city of Chicago, along with access to the southern suburbs through (I-355, I-294, and I-88). After exit 68, I-90 expands from eight to ten lanes and turns gradually southeast towards Des Plaines (passing through Rolling Meadows and Arlington Heights). Exit 73 (IL 83) is a diverging-diamond interchange; as it approaches the exit, I-90 moves to eight lanes as it passes directly north of O'Hare International Airport (crossing past the future I-490), widening back to ten lanes after crossing over US 12/US 45 (Mannheim Road). In Rosemont, the final exits for the Jane Addams Tollway are on Devon Avenue (westbound traffic) and River Road (eastbound); the final exit for both directions is exit 77 (Tri-State Tollway), which accesses I-294 and I-190 (an auxiliary leg of the Kennedy Expressway, connecting it to O'Hare Airport).

=== Chicago ===
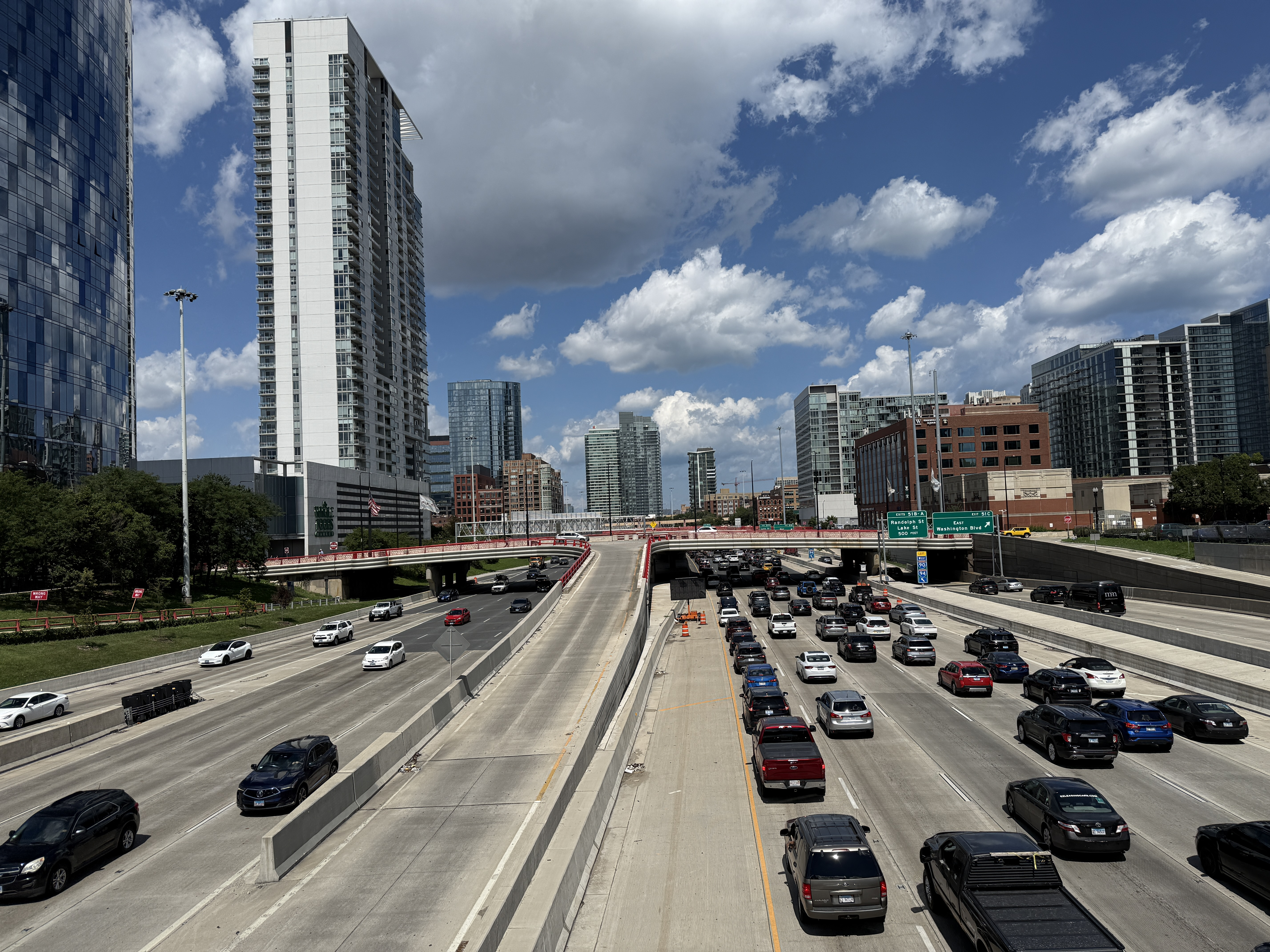
I-90/I-94 westbound on the Kennedy Expressway in Chicago

After crossing the Tri-State Tollway (I-294) and crossing the Des Plaines River, I-90 enters the Chicago city limits and becomes the toll-free Kennedy Expressway. As the CTA Blue Line operates in the median, the Kennedy uses side-mounted lighting. Following exit 81A crossing Harlem Avenue (IL 43), the highway turns southeast in direction. In the Mayfair neighborhood, I-94 joins the Kennedy as it crosses under IL 50 (Cicero Avenue). Along with marking the southern terminus of the Edens Expressway, the combined I-90/I-94 takes on the mile markers of the latter highway. The Blue Line returns underground, with the center of the I-90/I-94 Kennedy operating with reversible express lanes, directing express traffic (in addition to the eight lanes of local traffic). Following the direction of the Chicago River, the Kennedy Expressway has its eastern terminus in the West Loop at the Jane Byrne Interchange (passing the Eisenhower Expressway).

After passing through the Jane Byrne Interchange, I-90/I-94 becomes the Dan Ryan Expressway. In contrast to the electronically controlled gates used by the Kennedy, the Dan Ryan is up to 14 lanes wide (with a center express section and outer lanes for local traffic). Moving nearly entirely in a north-south direction, the highway travels to the Englewood neighborhood, where I-90 splits from I-94 (returning to its own mile markers). In becoming the tolled Chicago Skyway, I-90 becomes six lanes for the first time since entering the Chicago suburbs as the highway follows the southeast direction of the railroad tracks in the area. The skyway is an elevated road linked to a bridge crossing the Calumet River.

As it exits Illinois, I-90 continues into Hammond, Indiana, (directly over US 20 and US 41) before moving back onto ground level as the Indiana Toll Road.

== History ==
The eastern terminus of the Kennedy Expressway as westbound I-90 becomes the Jane Addams Tollway as it crosses under I-294 (Tri-State Tollway).

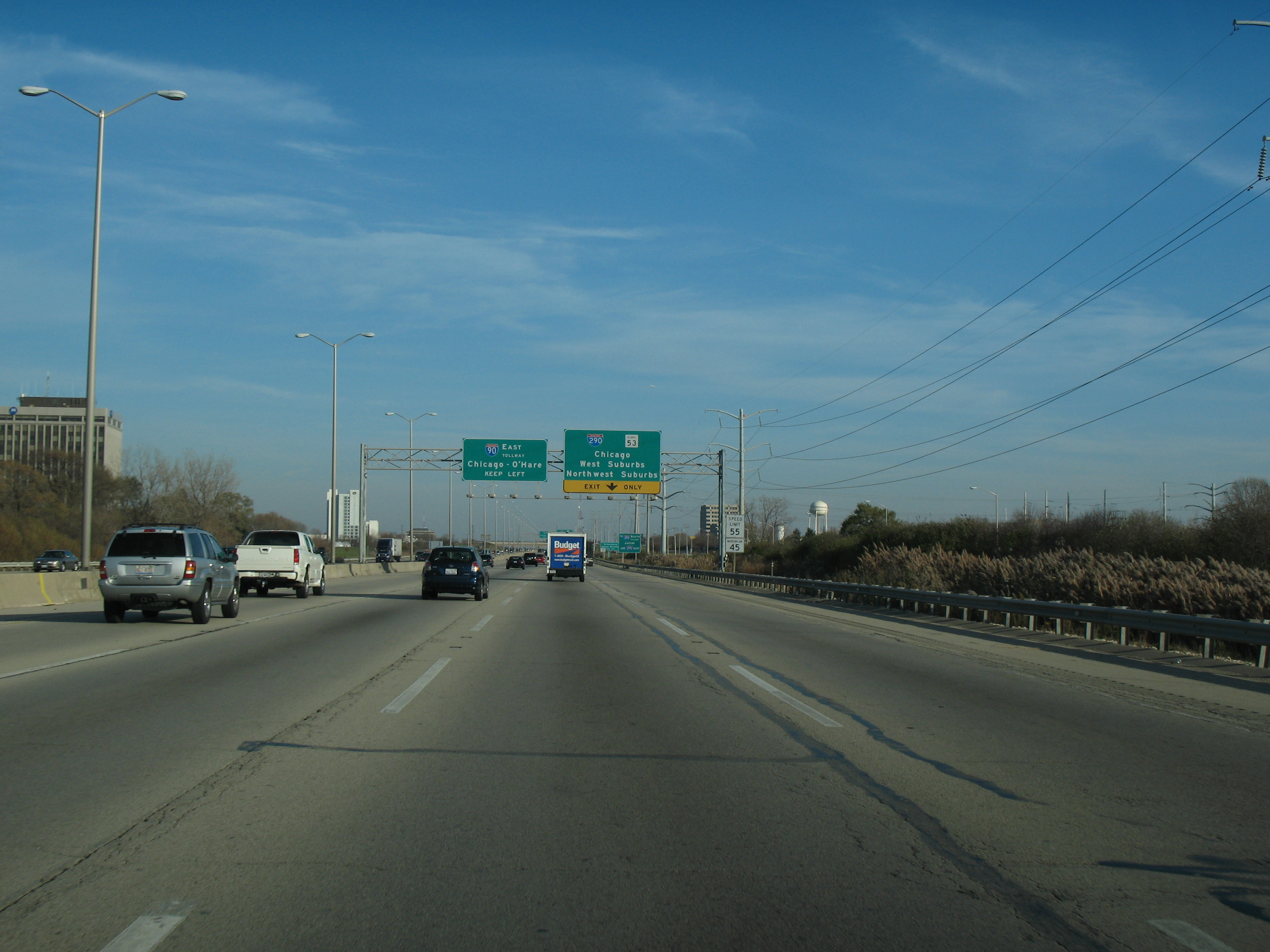
The Jane Addams Tollway in Schaumburg prior to the 2015–2016 rebuild and widening

=== Jane Addams Memorial Tollway (Northwest Tollway) ===
The Northwest Tollway (named the North Illinois Route during its design) began construction in 1956; at 76 miles in length, the highway formed nearly half of the original Illinois Tollway system. Following the routing of US 20 and US 51, the routing was to pass southward from Wisconsin through Rockford, where it would turn southeast toward Chicago through its northwestern suburbs, passing over O'Hare Airport to end at the Tri-State Tollway. Instead of passing through the city of Rockford, political opposition to the design shifted the routing in farmland close to the border of Winnebago and Boone County (a design change that brought nearly all subsequent growth of the city eastward).

The first portion of the Illinois Tollway to open to traffic in its entirety, the Northwest Tollway portion of I-90 opened on August 20, 1958 (four months before the Tri-State Tollway). Prior to the opening, the first vehicle to officially travel the new roadway was a covered wagon navigated by local resident John Madsen who took five days to make the journey.

Since 1958, the tollway has retained its original routing from the Illinois state line in South Beloit to I-294 in Rosemont, having undergone four designation changes. In 1973, the Eisenhower Expressway was extended to its current length, routing I-90 southward next to IL-53 instead of at I-294; to reflect the change, the portion of the tollway of between Illinois 53 and I-294 was redesignated as IL-194. In 1978, I-90 was moved to its current routing, replacing IL-194 entirely as it extended I-90 onto the Kennedy Expressway; the tollway retained its eastern terminus in Rosemont. In 1984, the northern segment of what would become I-39 opened, resulting in US 51 becoming rerouted onto I-90, joining at the eastern terminus of the Rockford US 20 bypass between Rockford and Cherry Valley. In 1999, I-39 was extended northward of the US 20 bypass and added to the tollway.

On September 7, 2007, the Northwest Tollway was renamed the Jane Addams Memorial Tollway after Jane Addams, the Nobel Peace Prize winner and founder of the Settlement House movement in the US.

==== Expansion and reconstruction ====
Following its opening, the highway underwent several expansions during the 20th century. In 1960, the portion of the highway north of O'Hare airport was widened to six lanes. In 1967, it was expanded to 6 lanes to Illinois 53; during 1974 and 1975, it was widened a second time, to Barrington Road. In 1984, the portion passing north of O'Hare was widened to its current 8-lane configuration. In 1992, the third major widening project extended its six-lane configuration to the Cook County line; in 1998, the widening extended past IL-31 in Elgin.

To better accommodate the westward expansion of the Chicago suburbs, several interchanges were added: Arlington Heights Road (1970), IL-47 (1972), Barrington Road (1975), Roselle Road (1984), Randall Road (1990), IL-59 (1992), and Beverly Road (1994). Initially linked to the Rockford region only at US Business 20 (State Street for Rockford and Belvidere) and US 20 (carrying US 51 onto I-90), the western end of the highway received several additional interchanges: Riverside Boulevard (1987), Rockton Road (1995), IL-173 (2007), and Irene Road (2009). In 2019, the first interchange in McHenry County was added south of Marengo, linking IL-23 to the highway.

In 2006, the Illinois Tollway began the conversion of its highway toll plazas from a barrier-gate design to open-road tolling (becoming the first state with the design on a large scale); for vehicles with I-Pass transponders, toll collection was handled without requiring to stop. On the full length of the I-90 tollway, the tollway commenced the installation of Intelligent Transportation Systems (ITS); along with the installation of traffic cameras and message signs, the ITS design added the capability to track weight management of trucks while still in motion (effectively eliminating the need for weigh stations). Within the Chicago suburbs, ITS included the installation of active traffic management gantries, adding the capability to manage traffic flow, communicating potential issues to motorists.

From 2008 to 2009, the I-90 tollway underwent its first major systemic reconstruction, named the $644.1 million (equivalent to $1.02 billion in 2025) Congestion Relief Program (CRP). To eliminate one of the largest congestion points on the route, the portion between the Rockton Road terminus of the tollway and Newburg Road (the final overpass before the I-39/I-90 split) was rebuilt and widened to six lanes; an interchange was also added at IL-173. In a $68.8 million project, the I-39/I-90 interchange was replaced entirely, eliminating a toll plaza in Cherry Valley.

In 2011, the I-90 Rebuilding and Widening Project portion of the Move Illinois project was approved. The $2.5 billion (equivalent to $3.4 billion in 2025) successor to the CRP was designed with multiple initiatives. To create a consistent width, the highway was widened from the I-39 to Randall Road to six lanes, where it was expanded to 8 lanes from Elgin to Rosemont; the western portion of the project was completed in 2014, with the eastern portion completed in 2017. In addition to its widening, the tollway underwent a major change to its design, as the grass median was removed to accommodate Flex Lanes on both shoulders; along with allowing for future expansion, in the Chicago suburbs, the design was developed to expand mass-transit opportunities along the highway. Along with replacing nearly bridge overpass on the route, multiple interchanges were reconfigured and expanded. From IL-59 to I-294, active traffic management was incorporated in 2017, adding the capability to manage traffic flow and passively communicating potential issues to motorists. In 2019, the project was completed, following the construction of an interchange with IL-23.

Following the national increase to the interstate speed limit, the I-90 tollway was raised to 65 mph from Randall Road to the Illinois state line, with trucks still limited to 55 mph. In 2018, ISTHA raised the speed limit on I-90 from 65 to 70 mph (105 to 113 km/h) from the state line to Randall Road. They also raised it from 55 to 70 mph (89 to 113 km/h) from Randall Road to Mount Prospect Road and raised it from 55 to 60 mph (89 to 97 km/h) from Mount Prospect Road to the Kennedy. The speed limit for buses is 65 mph (105 km/h), and the speed limit for trucks is 60 mph (97 km/h).

=== Kennedy and Dan Ryan expressways ===
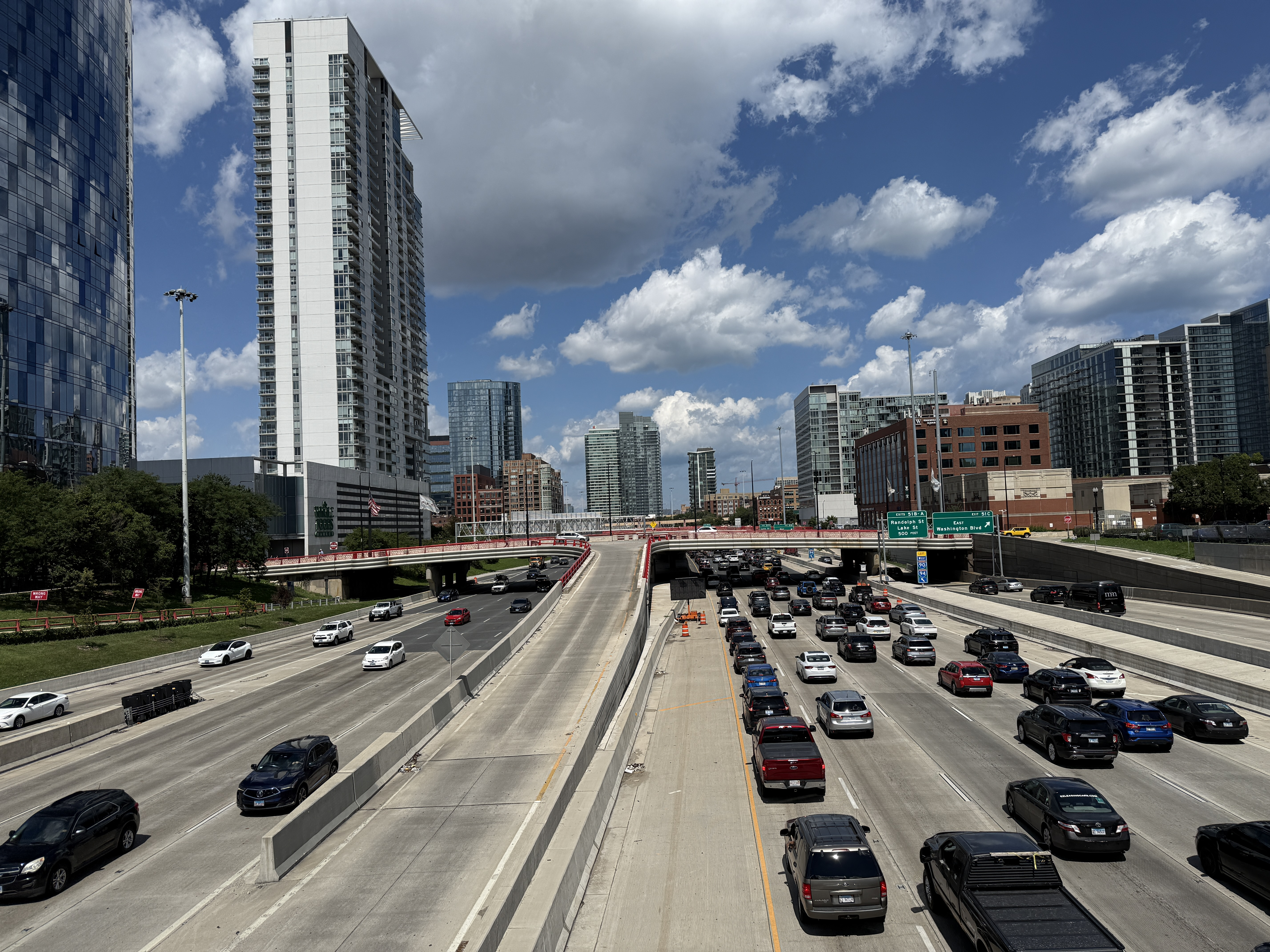
Kennedy Expressway (I-90/I-94 West) seen from Monroe Street overpass

14-lane Dan Ryan Expressway (I-90/94 West) on approach to 35th Street, as seen from center express lanes.

The current Kennedy Expressway began construction in 1955, using the northwest-southeast routing of Avondale Avenue and the C&NW Northwest Line (the CTA Blue Line of today). Opened in its entirety in November 1960, the Northwest Expressway was routed as Illinois Route 194; after it passed the southern terminus of the Edens Expressway, it was signed as I-94. Instead of passing through the city, I-90 served as a bypass route (taking the routing of the Congress Expressway - renamed the Eisenhower Expressway in 1964). On November 29, 1963 (to the minute), the Northwest Expressway was renamed after John F. Kennedy. In 1978, I-90 was realigned in Chicago, shifting its routing from the Eisenhower Expressway (renamed as I-290) to the Kennedy Expressway, with it forming the joined I-90/I-94.

The Dan Ryan Expressway began construction at the end of 1958, using a north-south routing primarily paralleling State Street. The namesake of Dan Ryan Jr. (a Chicago proponent of superhighway construction who secured state and federal funding for their construction), the original South Expressway was renamed in his honor after his 1961 death. Opening in its entirety in December 1962 carrying both I-90 and I-94, the Dan Ryan Expressway originally split I-94 onto the Chicago Skyway toll bridge, with I-90 moving into Indiana after joining I-80 (the current Bishop Ford and Kingery Expressway). In 1963, the routing was changed, with I-90 and I-94 trading places on the Chicago Skyway (a change also moving I-90 onto the Indiana Toll Road for its entirety in the state).

=== Chicago Skyway ===
Bridge deck of center span of Chicago Skyway bridge

The Chicago Skyway was originally known as the Calumet Skyway before 1960. It cost $101 million (equivalent to $863 million in 2025) to construct and took about 34 months (nearly three years) to build. Nearly eight miles (13 km) of elevated roadway, the Chicago Skyway was originally built as a shortcut for cars from State Street, a major north–south street on Chicago's South Side that serves the Loop, to the steel mills on the Southeast to the Indiana state line where the Indiana Toll Road begins. Later, when the Dan Ryan Expressway opened, the Chicago Skyway was extended west to connect to it. There are only two eastbound exits east of the toll barrier, whereas there are four westbound exits west of the toll barrier (so that no exits are available until one has crossed the bridge and paid the toll). The Chicago Skyway opened to traffic on April 16, 1958.

The Skyway's official name, referring to it as a "toll bridge" rather than a "toll road", is the result of a legal quirk. At the time of its construction, the city charter of Chicago did not provide the authority to construct a toll road. However, the city could build toll bridges, and it was found that there was no limit to the length of the approaches to the bridge. Therefore, the Skyway is technically a toll bridge spanning the Calumet River with a six-mile-long (9.7 km) approach. This also is part of the reason that there are no exits available until after one has crossed the bridge and paid the toll.

Historically, the Chicago Skyway was signed as, and was widely considered to be part of, I-90 from the mid-1960s forward (after I-90 in this area had been swapped with I-94). However, from around 1999 until 2022, the Chicago Department of Transportation worked under a new assumption that they had never received official approval to designate the Skyway as I-90. The city subsequently replaced most of the "I-90" signage with "TO I-90/I-94" signage. IDOT has always reported and continues to report the Skyway as part of the Interstate Highway System, and the Federal Highway Administration (FHWA) also does consider the Chicago Skyway's roadway as I-90 unless IDOT revokes their designation of such. As of 2022, the Skyway is again signed as I-90, though now denoted with non-standard oversized shields constructed by CDOT.

In the 1960s, the newly constructed Dan Ryan Expressway and the neighboring Calumet, Kingery, and Borman expressways provided free alternatives to the tollway, and the Skyway became much less used. As a result, from the 1970s through the early 1990s, the Skyway was unable to repay revenue bonds used in its construction. Traffic volumes rebounded from the late 1990s onward, partially because of the construction of casinos in Northwest Indiana, along with reconstruction of the Dan Ryan, Kingery, and Borman expressways. In June 2005, the Skyway became compatible with electronic toll collection, with users now able to pay tolls using I-Pass or E-ZPass transponders.

Chicago's Department of Streets and Sanitation formerly maintained the Chicago Skyway Toll Bridge System. A 2004 transaction that gave the city a $1.83-billion (equivalent to $2.99 billion in 2025) cash infusion leased the Skyway to the Skyway Concession Company, a joint-venture between the Australian Macquarie Infrastructure Group and Spanish Cintra, which assumed operations on the Skyway on a 99-year operating lease. The agreement between the Skyway Concession Company and the City of Chicago marked the first time an existing toll road was moved from public to private operation in the US.

Until the summer of 2015, to the south of the toll plaza, an unusually-placed McDonald's restaurant and its parking lot (including a drive-thru) sat in the median of the toll approach as a de facto rest stop before leaving or entering Chicago. The franchisee terminated the lease with the SCC shortly before, blaming closure on the declining profits as the restaurant was more popular for its restrooms than the food it offered. The McDonald's building was later torn down, and the toll approach was further expanded upon its former footprint.

== Tolling ==
=== Jane Addams Tollway ===
Westbound I-90 Toll plaza south of Belvidere. 2016 photo – the cash-payment lanes have since closed.

Outside of the city of Chicago, Interstate 90 has been tolled since its opening. The Illinois Tollway collects tolls for approximately 77 miles, from Rockton Road (Winnebago CR-9) to the Tri-State Tollway (I-294). The western portion is west of Exit 15 (the I-39/I-90 split), with the eastern portion is from Exit 15 eastward to I-294. Originally known as the Northwest Tollway, the tolled portion was renamed as the Jane Addams Memorial Tollway in 2007. Since 1997, the tollway has used the I-Pass electronic collection system (transponders cross-compatible with E-ZPass).

With the exception of its US 20 interchanges in Rockford (Exit 15–State Street) and Hampshire (Exit 42–Hampshire/Marengo), each interchange is tolled on two of its ramps, varying in direction between entrance and exit ramps. In addition to its tolled ramps, I-90 has six toll plazas, with the South Beloit and Elgin plazas collecting in both directions. The Belvidere and Marengo plazas collect tolls for westbound and eastbound traffic, respectively; in Rosemont, westbound traffic passes through the Devon Road plaza (between the two IL 72 exits) and eastbound traffic passes through the River Road plaza (1 mile east of I-294).

I-90 originally used a ticket system to collect tolls, converting to coin collection in the mid-1970s. Following the advent of I-Pass transponders, the tollway jointly used both electronic and coin collection. In 2006, the toll plazas on the highway were redesigned, introducing open-road tolling, adding gateless collection lanes alongside coin lanes and manned tollbooths. In 2017, I-90 was converted to electronic tolling, replacing collection lanes with overhead collection gantries (allowing tolls to be collected traveling at full speed). In 2020, coin collection was retired entirely. The closure of barrier gates and manned tollbooths shifted all traffic to drive through the electronic collection lanes, ending the practice of stopping for toll payment. For vehicles lacking a transponder, collection shifted to an online-pay system.

Currently, toll prices vary by vehicle type; for automobiles, $0.75 is charged for I-90 plazas and $0.30–$0.45 for ramp plazas. For vehicles that pay online (lacking an I-Pass/E-ZPass transponder), the price is doubled.

=== Chicago Skyway ===
Chicago Skyway Toll Booth

Illinois border with Indiana, as seen from Indianapolis Avenue. The Chicago Skyway crosses over the combined US 12/20/41 before returning to ground level in Hammond, Indiana

For its last 8 miles in Illinois, I-90 is tolled as the Chicago Skyway. Serving as the link between the Dan Ryan Expressway and the Illinois Toll Road, the Skyway is a six-lane elevated highway connected to a bridge crossing the Calumet River. Originally operated by the City of Chicago, the toll bridge was leased to privately-operated Skyway Concession Company LLC in 2005.

In contrast with the Jane Addams Tollway, the Skyway operates through a single toll plaza. Separate from the Illinois Tollway, the Skyway operates with cash and credit-card payments and is compatible with I-Pass/E-ZPass transponders. Currently, the Skyway charges a flat rate of $8.10 for cars, with rates between $28.40 and $66.10 for commercial vehicles (dependent on axle count); a significant discount is applied for commercial vehicles traveling on off-peak hours.

== Exit list ==
County	Location	mi	km	Exit	Destinations	Notes
Winnebago	South Beloit	0.00	0.00		I-39 north / I-90 west – Madison	Continuation into Wisconsin
Winnebago	South Beloit	0.29	0.47	1	US 51 north / IL 75 – South Beloit	Western end of US 51 concurrency
Winnebago	Rockton	2.71	4.36	3	CR 9 (Rockton Road) – Rockton, Roscoe	Northwestern end of Jane Addams Memorial Tollway; last eastbound exit before toll
Winnebago	Rockton	3.60	5.79	South Beloit Toll Plaza 1		
Winnebago	Machesney Park	8.94	14.39	8	IL 173 (West Lane Road) – Machesney Park	Tolled westbound exit and eastbound entrance
Winnebago	Rockford	12.47	20.07	12	CR 55 west (East Riverside Boulevard)	Tolled westbound exit and eastbound entrance
Winnebago	Rockford	15.76	25.36	15	US 20 Bus. (State Street)	
Winnebago	Cherry Valley	17.40	28.00	17	I-39 south / US 51 south to US 20 – Bloomington	Eastern end of I-39/US 51 concurrency; I-39 exit 122
Boone	Belvidere	20.40	32.83	20	Irene Road	Tolled eastbound exit and westbound entrance
Boone	Belvidere	22.93	36.90	Belvidere Toll Plaza 5 (westbound)		
Boone	Belvidere	23.51	37.84	Belvidere Oasis		
Boone	Belvidere	24.62	39.62	25	Belvidere–Genoa Road	Tolled exit ramps
McHenry	Marengo	36.10	58.10	36	IL 23 – Marengo, Genoa	Tolled exit ramps and westbound entrance
McHenry	Marengo	37.39	60.17	Marengo Toll Plaza 7 (eastbound)		
Kane	Hampshire	41.54	66.85	42	US 20 – Hampshire, Marengo	
Kane	Huntley	46.02	74.06	47	IL 47 – Huntley, Woodstock, Elburn	
Kane	Elgin	51.78	83.33	52	CR 34 (Randall Road)	Tolled eastbound exit and westbound entrance
Kane	Elgin	53.42	85.97	Elgin Toll Plaza 9		
Kane	Elgin	54.22	87.26	54	IL 31 (State Street, 8th Street) – Elgin	Signed as exits 54A (south) and 54B (north); tolled westbound exit and eastbound entrance
Kane–Cook county line	Elgin	55.95	90.04	56	IL 25 (Dundee Avenue)	Tolled westbound exit and eastbound entrance
Cook	Hoffman Estates	57.77	92.97	58	Beverly Road	Westbound exit and eastbound entrance; tolled westbound exit
Cook	Hoffman Estates	59.31	95.45	59	IL 59 (Sutton Road)	Tolled exit ramps
Cook	Hoffman Estates	61.81	99.47	62	Barrington Road	Single-point urban interchange
Cook	Schaumburg	65.19	104.91	65	Roselle Road	Westbound entrance ramp via Central Road
Cook	Schaumburg	66.93	107.71	67	Meacham Road	Westbound exit and entrance; no access from I-290 and IL 53 ramp
Cook	Rolling Meadows	67.84	109.18	68	I-290 east / IL 53 to I-355 Toll south / IL 390 Toll – Chicago, West Suburbs, Northwest Suburbs	Signed as exits 68A (east/south) and 68B (north); tolled eastbound exit; western terminus of I-290
Cook	Arlington Heights	70.47	113.41	70	Arlington Heights Road	Tolled eastbound exit and westbound entrance
Cook	Des Plaines	73.25	117.88	73	Elmhurst Road to IL 83	Tolled eastbound exit and westbound entrance
Cook	Des Plaines	74.5	119.9	74	I-490 Toll south (Western O'Hare Beltway)	Currently under construction; expected to be complete in 2026; will be I-490 exits 6A-B
Cook	Des Plaines	74.5	119.9	Des Plaines Oasis (Note: This oasis was demolished in 2014 to make way for the I-490 project.)		
Cook	Des Plaines	75.80	121.99	76	IL 72 (Lee Street)	Westbound exit and eastbound entrance
Cook	Rosemont	76.75	123.52	Devon Avenue Toll Plaza 17 (westbound)		
Cook	Rosemont	77.03	123.97	—	IL 72 (Higgins Road) / Devon Avenue	Westbound entrance
Cook	Rosemont	77.20	124.24	77A	I-190 west (Kennedy Expressway) – O'Hare I-294 Toll south (Tri-State Tollway) – Indiana	Eastbound exit and westbound entrance; I-190 exit 1C; I-294 exit 40
Cook	Rosemont	77.20	124.24	77B	I-294 Toll north (Tri-State Tollway) – Milwaukee	Signed as exit 77 westbound; I-294 exit 40B
Cook	Rosemont	78.20	125.85	River Road Toll Plaza 19 (eastbound)		
Cook	Chicago	79.28	127.59	79	IL 171 (Cumberland Avenue)	Signed as exits 79A (south) and 79B (north); westbound exits via I-190; eastbound exit 79A via River Road Toll Plaza
Cook	Chicago	78.65– 79.6	126.57– 128.1	79C	I-190 west (Kennedy Expressway) to I-294 Toll south (Tri-State Tollway) – O'Hare, Indiana	Westbound exit and eastbound entrance; eastern terminus of I-190; southeastern end of Jane Addams Memorial Tollway; last westbound exit before toll; former exit 78
Cook	Chicago	79.99	128.73	80	Canfield Road	Westbound exit and eastbound entrance
Cook	Chicago	80.84	130.10	81A	IL 43 (Harlem Avenue)	Eastern terminus of IL 72
Cook	Chicago	81.14	130.58	81B	Sayre Avenue	Westbound exit and eastbound entrance
Cook	Chicago	81.85	131.72	82A	Nagle Avenue	No westbound exit
Cook	Chicago	82.09	132.11	82B	Bryn Mawr Avenue to Nagle Avenue	Westbound exit
Cook	Chicago	82.31	132.47	82C	Austin Avenue to Foster Avenue	Eastbound exit
Cook	Chicago	82.79	133.24	83A	Foster Avenue	No eastbound exit
Cook	Chicago	83.01	133.59	83B	Central Avenue	Westbound exit and eastbound entrance
Cook	Chicago	83.71	134.72	84	Lawrence Avenue	Eastbound To I-94
Cook	Chicago	84.35– 84.59	135.75– 136.13	—	I-94 west (Edens Expressway) – Milwaukee	Western end of I-94 concurrency; westbound exit and eastbound entrance; western end of reversible express lanes; I-94 exit 43B
Cook	Chicago	84.77	136.42	43C	Montrose Avenue	Westbound exit and eastbound entrance
Cook	Chicago	85.03	136.84	43D	Kostner Avenue	Westbound exit
Cook	Chicago	85.39– 85.62	137.42– 137.79	44A	IL 19 (Irving Park Road) / Keeler Avenue	No westbound exit
Cook	Chicago	85.62– 85.81	137.79– 138.10	44B	IL 19 (Irving Park Road) / Pulaski Road	Westbound exit and eastbound entrance
Cook	Chicago	86.34	138.95	45A	Addison Street	
Cook	Chicago	86.77	139.64	45B	Kimball Avenue	
Cook	Chicago	87.08	140.14	45C	Belmont Avenue / Kedzie Avenue	Westbound exit and eastbound entrance
Cook	Chicago	87.64	141.04	—	Sacramento Avenue	Eastbound entrance
Cook	Chicago	87.79	141.28	46A	California Avenue, Diversey Avenue	Eastbound exit and westbound entrance
Cook	Chicago	87.96	141.56	46B	Diversey Avenue, California Avenue	Westbound exit and eastbound entrance
Cook	Chicago	88.53– 88.90	142.48– 143.07	47A	Western Avenue / Fullerton Avenue	Westbound exit and eastbound entrance from Western Avenue
Cook	Chicago	89.08	143.36	47B	Damen Avenue	Westbound exit and eastbound entrance
Cook	Chicago	89.52	144.07	48A	Armitage Avenue	Eastbound traffic uses Armitage Avenue to Ashland Avenue
Cook	Chicago	90.10	145.00	48B	IL 64 (North Avenue)	Westbound traffic uses North Avenue to Ashland Avenue
Cook	Chicago	90.66	145.90	49A	Division Street	
Cook	Chicago	90.91	146.31	49B	Augusta Boulevard / Milwaukee Avenue	Westbound exit and eastbound entrance
Cook	Chicago	91.40	147.09	50A	Ogden Avenue	Eastbound exit and westbound entrance
Cook	Chicago	91.62	147.45	50B	Ohio Street	Eastern end of reversible express lanes; access to Navy Pier
Cook	Chicago	92.19	148.37	51A	Lake Street	Westbound exit and eastbound entrance
Cook	Chicago	92.27	148.49	51B	Randolph Street west	
Cook	Chicago	92.34	148.61	51C	Washington Boulevard east	Exits only; no entrances
Cook	Chicago	92.44	148.77	51D	Madison Street	
Cook	Chicago	92.53	148.91	51E	Monroe Street	Eastbound exit
Cook	Chicago	92.62	149.06	51F	Adams Street west	Eastbound exit and westbound entrance; Route 66
Cook	Chicago	92.71	149.20	51G	Jackson Boulevard east	Eastbound exit and westbound entrance
Cook	Chicago	92.72– 93.35	149.22– 150.23	51H	I-290 west / IL 110 (CKC) west (Eisenhower Expressway) – Aurora	Jane Byrne Interchange; southeastern end of Kennedy Expressway; northern end of Dan Ryan Expressway; eastern termini of I-290/IL 110
Cook	Chicago	92.72– 93.35	149.22– 150.23	51I	Ida B. Wells Drive	Jane Byrne Interchange; southeastern end of Kennedy Expressway; northern end of Dan Ryan Expressway; eastern termini of I-290/IL 110
Cook	Chicago	93.42	150.34	51J	Taylor Street / Roosevelt Road	Eastbound exit and westbound entrance; former exit 52A
Cook	Chicago	93.57	150.59	52B	Roosevelt Road / Taylor Street	Westbound exit and eastbound entrance
Cook	Chicago	94.22	151.63	52C	18th Street	Eastbound exit and westbound entrance
Cook	Chicago	94.48	152.05	53A	Canalport Avenue / Cermak Road	Westbound exit and eastbound entrance; Chinatown exit
Cook	Chicago	94.22– 96.04	151.63– 154.56	53	I-55 (Stevenson Expressway) / 22nd Street – St. Louis, Lake Shore Drive, Chinatown	Signed as exits 53B (south) and 53C (north) westbound; I-55 exits 292 and 293B; Cermak Road access from westbound only; western end of express lanes
Cook	Chicago	96.16	154.75	54	31st Street	
Cook	Chicago	96.45	155.22	55A	35th Street	Access to Rate Field and the Illinois Institute of Technology
Cook	Chicago	96.98	156.07	55B	Pershing Road	
Cook	Chicago	97.44	156.81	56A	43rd Street	
Cook	Chicago	97.97	157.67	56B	47th Street	
Cook	Chicago	98.88	159.13	57	Garfield Boulevard	Access to Midway Airport
Cook	Chicago	99.50	160.13	58A	59th Street	Westbound exit and eastbound entrance
Cook	Chicago	100.00	160.93	58B	63rd Street	Eastbound exit and westbound entrance
Cook	Chicago	100.00– 100.33	160.93– 161.47	—	I-94 east (Dan Ryan Expressway) – Indiana Chicago Skyway begins	Eastern end of I-94 concurrency; eastern end of express lanes; eastbound exit and westbound entrance; I-94 exit 59A
Cook	Chicago	100.33	161.47	100	State Street	Westbound exit and eastbound entrance
Cook	Chicago	101.42	163.22	101	St. Lawrence Avenue	Westbound exit and eastbound entrance
Cook	Chicago	101.78	163.80	102	73rd Street	Westbound exit and eastbound entrance
Cook	Chicago	103.04– 103.33	165.83– 166.29	103	Stony Island Avenue north to Lake Shore Drive	Westbound exit and eastbound entrance
Cook	Chicago	103.93	167.26	—	Jeffery Boulevard	Eastbound entrance
Cook	Chicago	104.28	167.82	104	87th Street	Westbound exit
Cook	Chicago	104.67	168.45	Chicago Skyway Toll Plaza		
Cook	Chicago	105.26	169.40	105	Anthony Avenue / 92nd Street	Eastbound exit and westbound entrance
Cook	Chicago	105.82– 106.21	170.30– 170.93	Chicago Skyway Toll Bridge		
Cook	Chicago	107.62	173.20	107	US 12 / US 20 / US 41 / LMCT (Indianapolis Boulevard)	Eastbound exit and westbound entrance
Cook	Chicago	107.82	173.52		I-90 Toll east / Indiana Toll Road east to I-65 / I-80 / I-94 – South Bend, Toledo Chicago Skyway ends	Continuation into Indiana
1.000 mi = 1.609 km; 1.000 km = 0.621 mi: Concurrency terminus; Incomplete access; Tolled; Route transition; Unopened

== Related routes ==
I-90 has two related auxiliary Interstate Highways within Illinois, both within Cook County.

Located in Rosemont and Chicago, I-190 is a 3 mile-long extension of the Kennedy Expressway, connecting it to O'Hare Airport. As it moves westward from I-90, I-190 passes over I-294 and US 12/20/45 (Mannheim Road) before entering the O'Hare perimeter, servicing Terminal 5 before splitting to access the main O'Hare parking facilities and the road system servicing the passenger concourses for Terminals 1, 2, and 3.

Bypassing the Kennedy Expressway in its entirety, I-290 (Dwight D. Eisenhower Expressway) is a 30 mile-long route connecting Chicago to Rolling Meadows. Moving westward from the Jane Byrne Interchange (its terminus with I-90/94), I-290 passes through the western Chicago suburbs. In Hillside, I-290 turns north (routed alongside I-294), moving northwest in Elmhurst. After paralleling US 20 (Lake Street), I-290 follows the routing of IL 53, ending at the Jane Addams Tollway.

A third auxiliary route is under construction, designated as I-490 (currently named the Western O'Hare Beltway). Designed to pass alongside the western perimeter of O'Hare Airport from Franklin Park to Des Plaines, the new route connects I-294 to I-90 and will form the new eastern terminus of IL-390 (Elgin–O'Hare Tollway). In October 2026, the first portion of the route was opened, connecting I-294 to Franklin Avenue.

== See also ==
- List of bridges documented by the Historic American Engineering Record in Illinois

== Notes ==
Interstate 90
Previous state: Wisconsin	Illinois	Next state: Indiana
