= Helen Keller School =

Helen Keller School may refer to any of the following:

- The Helen Keller School at the Alabama Institute for the Deaf and Blind
- Helen Keller Junior High School (Schaumburg, Illinois)
- Helen Keller Middle School in Easton, Connecticut
