= Interstate 490 (Illinois) =

Highway in Illinois

Interstate 490 Toll
- I-490 highlighted in red (completed) and pink (unfinished)

Route information
- Auxiliary route of I-90
- Maintained by ISTHA
- Length: 1.5 mi (2.4 km)
- Existed: October 23, 2026–present

Major junctions
- South end: I-294 Toll in Franklin Park
- IL 19 in Bensenville; IL 390 Toll in Bensenville; IL 72 in Elk Grove Village
- North end: I-90 Toll in Des Plaines

Location
- Country: United States
- State: Illinois
- Counties: Cook, DuPage

Highway system
- Illinois State Highway System; Interstate; US; State; Tollways; Scenic
← I-474	→ IL 1

Interstate 490 (I-490), also known as the O'Hare West Bypass and Western O'Hare Beltway, is a six-mile (9.7 km) electronic toll highway and a beltway that is currently under construction near Chicago, Illinois; it will run along the west side of O'Hare International Airport. The tollway will connect I-294 (Tri-State Tollway) to a western access point to the airport. From there, it will continue northward to an extension of Illinois Route 390 (IL 390, formerly known as the Elgin-O'Hare Expressway) and I-90 (Jane Addams Memorial Tollway). The O'Hare Western Bypass is part of the Elgin–O'Hare Western Access (EOWA) project. Building the highway will affect the villages of Elk Grove Village, Wood Dale, Itasca, and Bensenville. The route will run through the 1979 American Airlines Flight 191 crash site, the deadliest aviation accident in US history.

== Route description ==
I-490 will begin at a partial interchange with I-294 (Tri-State Tollway) in Franklin Park, south of O'Hare International Airport. There will be an interchange with Franklin Avenue/Green Street. The tollway will head north before curving westward to briefly parallel the Canadian Pacific Railway before crossing it. Immediately afterwards, the tollway will have an interchange with IL 19 (Irving Park Road). On the western side of O'Hare International Airport, I-490 will have an interchange with IL 390 (Elgin–O'Hare Tollway) at the entrance to a planned western terminal. Continuing north, I-490 will cross over the Canadian Pacific Railway and the Union Pacific Railroad Milwaukee Subdivision and have an interchange with IL 72 (Touhy Avenue) before ending at a trumpet interchange with I-90 (Jane Addams Memorial Tollway) in Des Plaines.

== History ==
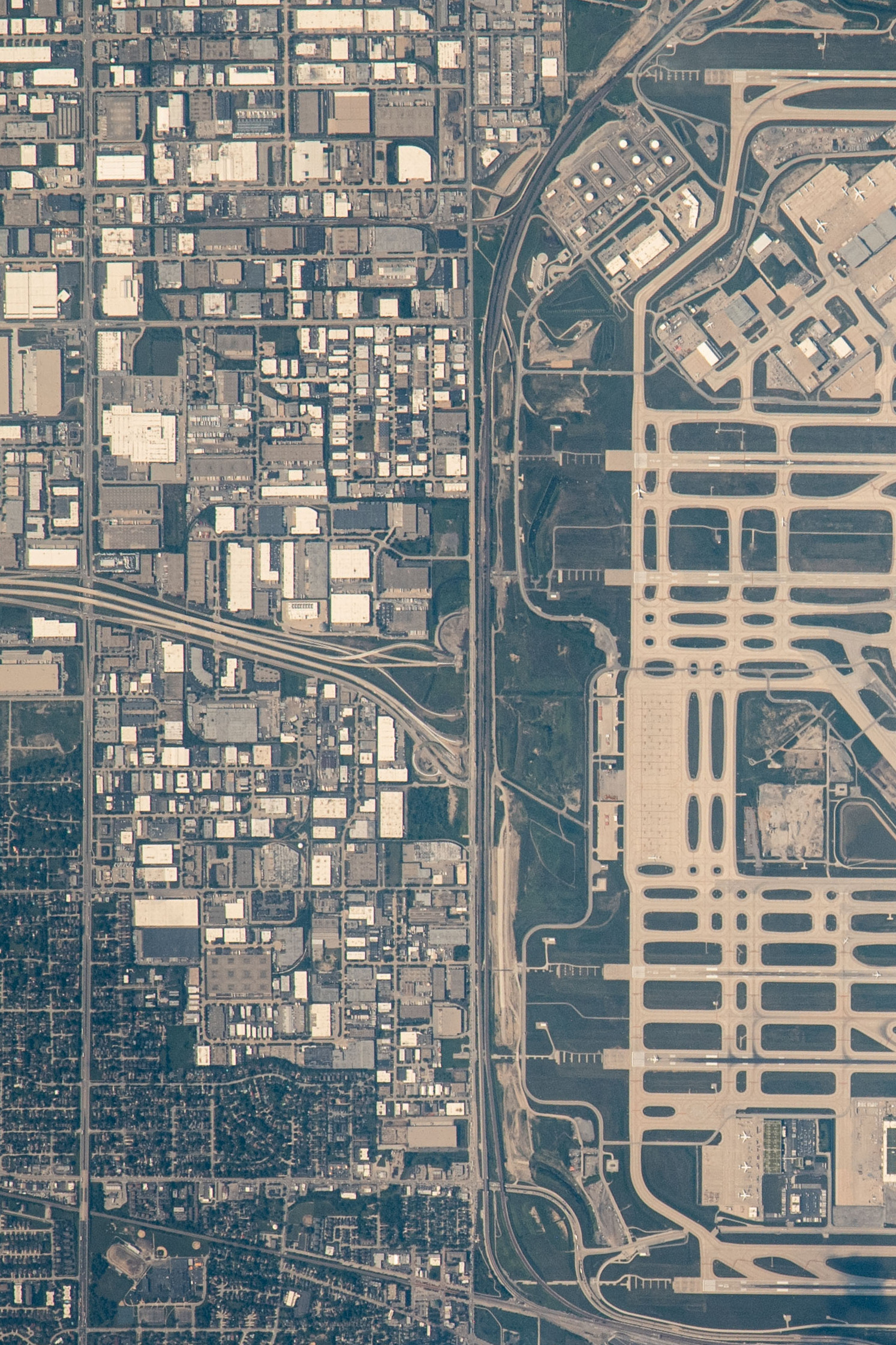
I-490 construction site along the western edge of O'Hare Airport, July 2023

In December 2009, the Illinois Department of Transportation (IDOT) finalized the routing of the western bypass. Intermediate interchanges are planned at County Line Road/Franklin Avenue, IL 19, IL 390, and IL 72.

On August 25, 2011, the Illinois State Toll Highway Authority (ISTHA) approved a $12-billion (equivalent to $16.9 billion in 2025) capital plan called Move Illinois, which seeks to improve toll roads under their jurisdiction; the authority doubled toll rates to help fund it. The bypass is also part of the EOWA project.

On October 6, 2014, IDOT submitted an application to the American Association of State Highway and Transportation Officials (AASHTO) for the creation of the new I-490 designation. AASHTO approved the I-490 designation on November 20, 2014, contingent on Federal Highway Administration (FHWA) approval.

In November 2015, the Canadian Pacific Railway (doing business in the US as the Soo Line Railroad) sought a federal injunction to block ISTHA from acquiring land in the Bensenville Rail Yard to build the tollway, over fears that this would impact rail traffic. In 2016, ISTHA sued the Canadian Pacific Railway to request that the United States Surface Transportation Board allow for the construction of the tollway. On June 13, 2018, ISTHA and the Canadian Pacific Railway agreed to settle the dispute.

Construction on the interchange with I-90 began on September 12, 2018; the interchange was scheduled to be finished in 2023, but that has since been pushed out to 2025 then to 2027. The rest of the highway was originally scheduled to be completed by 2027, but that has been since pushed out to 2029.

In preparation for the interchange at Interstate 90, and the widening of I-90, the Des Plaines Oasis over the tollway was permanently closed on March 16, 2014. Though the highway structure closed, the northbound and southbound fueling stations remained open until December 14, 2018, when their lease expired. These businesses were eventually closed on December 14, 2018. The oasis, which opened on June 24, 1959, was the second oldest of the five original tollway oases in Illinois. The remaining structures of the oasis were demolished in April 2019 as construction work on the interchange began.

The first section between I-294 and Franklin Avenue opened on October 23, 2026.

== Exit list ==
County	Location	mi	km	Exit	Destinations	Notes
Cook	Franklin Park	0	0.0	—	I-294 Toll (Tri-State Tollway) – Indiana	Opened October 23, 2026; southbound exit and northbound entrance
Cook	Franklin Park	1	1.6	1A	Franklin Avenue	Opened October 23, 2026; accessible via a connector road
DuPage	Bensenville	1.5	2.4	1B	IL 19 east (Irving Park Road)	Planned interchange; will be a southbound exit and northbound entrance
DuPage	Bensenville	2	3.2	2	IL 19 west (Irving Park Road) / South Access Road	Planned interchange
DuPage	Bensenville	3	4.8	3	IL 390 Toll west (Elgin–O'Hare Tollway)	Planned interchange expected to be completed in 2027; IL 390 exits 17A-B; eastern terminus of IL 390; may also include access to a planned western terminal at O’Hare
Cook	Elk Grove Village	4	6.4	4	CR 8 south (South York Road) / North Elmhurst Road / Devon Avenue	Planned interchange; will be a southbound exit and northbound entrance
Cook	Elk Grove Village	5	8.0	5	IL 72 (Touhy Avenue)	Planned interchange; will be a northbound exit and southbound entrance
Cook	Des Plaines	6	9.7	6	I-90 Toll east (Jane Addams Memorial Tollway) – O'Hare, Chicago	Trumpet interchange expected to be completed in 2027; I-90 exit 74
Cook	Des Plaines	6	9.7	—	I-90 Toll west (Jane Addams Memorial Tollway) – Rockford	Planned northern terminus; trumpet interchange expected to be completed in 2027; I-90 exit 74
1.000 mi = 1.609 km; 1.000 km = 0.621 mi: Unopened
