= Illinois Tollway =

U.S. state administrative agency

Illinois State Toll Highway Authority
- Seal of ISTHA

- Logo, using alternate name

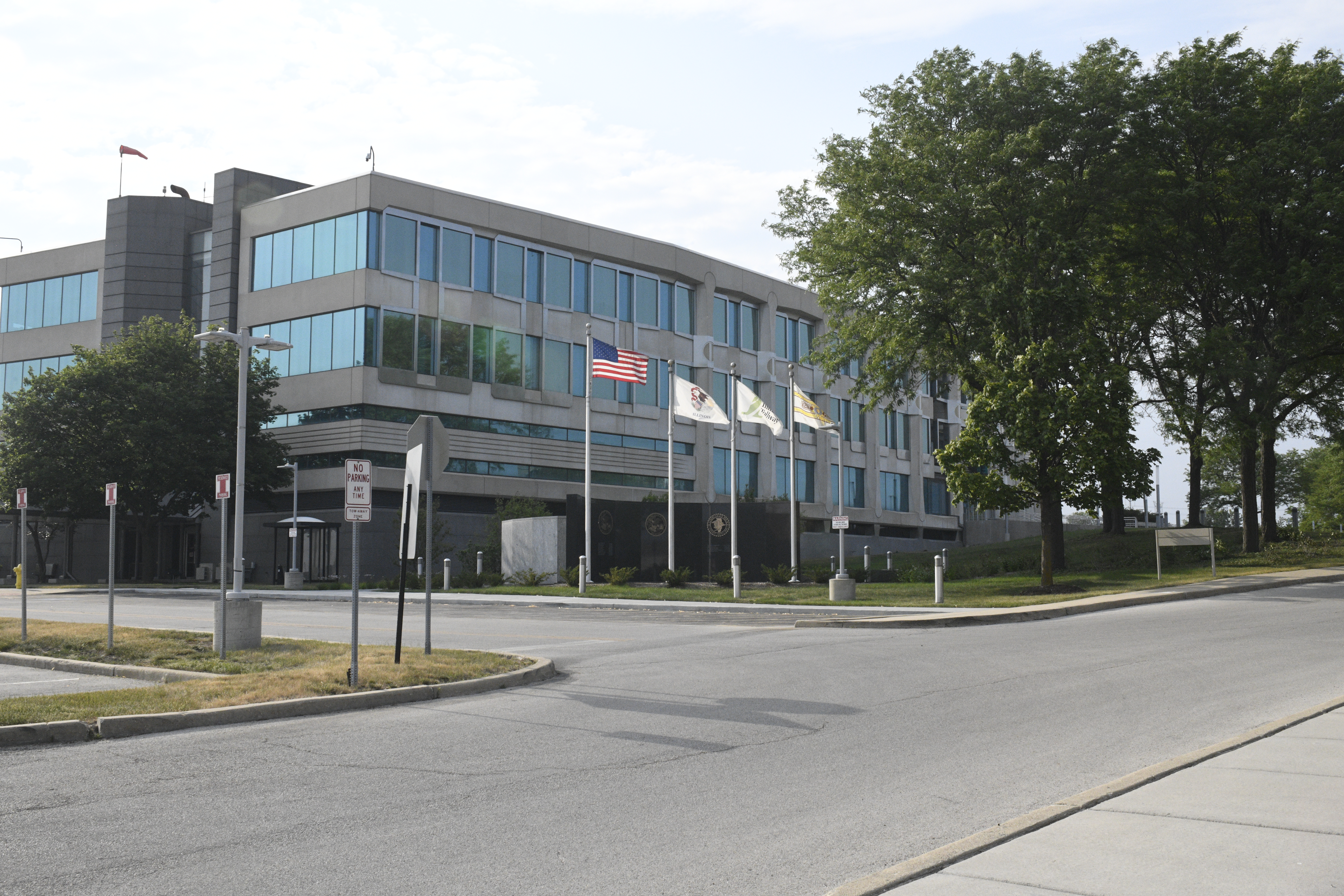
- Illinois Tollway Headquarters

Agency overview
- Formed: 1941
- Type: Independent
- Headquarters: 2700 Ogden Avenue, Downers Grove, Illinois; 41°48′22″N 88°03′04″W
- Employees: 1,364
- Annual budget: $1.72 billion
- Agency executives: Cassaundra Rouse, Executive Director; Arnie Rivera, Chairman of the Board
- Parent agency: State of Illinois
- Website: www.illinoistollway.com

The Illinois State Toll Highway Authority (ISTHA) is an administrative agency of the U.S. state of Illinois charged with building, operating, and maintaining toll roads in the state. The roads, as well as the authority itself, are sometimes referred to as the Illinois Tollway. (Note: In reports on the authority in the press, such as those by the Chicago Sun-Times, Chicago Tribune and the Daily Herald, the authority's full name is used. On some of the authority's signage, and in letters to the editor, "Illinois Tollway" is used. The authority's official website uses both.) The system opened in 1958 in the Chicago area, and has subsequently expanded to include the eastern and central sections of Interstate 88 (I-88) extending into the northwestern part of the state. Beginning in 2005, the system was reconstructed to include more lanes and open road tolling, the latter of which uses I-Pass transponders to collect revenue as vehicles pass antennas at toll plazas or designated entrance or exit ramps. As of 2017, ISTHA maintains and operates 294 miles (473 km) of tollways in 12 counties in Northern Illinois.

== History ==
The original Toll Highway Authority was established in 1941. After construction of the first toll highways in Illinois was delayed by World War II, the Illinois State Toll Highway Commission was established in 1953. The first three toll highways in the Chicago area were all planned, constructed, and opened in 1958 under the authority of this Commission. These first three toll highways are the present day Jane Addams Memorial Tollway (I-90/I-39/US 51), the Tri-State Tollway (I-94/I-294) and the Ronald Reagan Memorial Tollway (I-88, between Hillside and Sugar Grove). The first segment to open was the Jane Addams Memorial Tollway between Devon Avenue and Elgin on August 20, 1958 at 3 p.m. The Toll Highway Act, in its present form, dates from 1967, but has been amended since. Under this Act, promulgated April 1, 1968, ISTHA assumed the assets and obligations of the Illinois State Toll Highway Commission.

In the 1970s, the East–West Tollway was extended west from Sugar Grove to Dixon with a freeway continuing to the Quad Cities. The route was later given the I-88 designation in order to obtain a higher speed limit. In 2004, ISTHA voted to rename this route the Ronald Reagan Memorial Tollway.

In June 1984, Republican minority leader of the Illinois House of Representatives, James "Pate" Philip, helped push through legislation authorizing the construction of the North–South Tollway, then referred to as simply the DuPage Tollway. Officials at the Morton Arboretum, one of the nation's premier woodland research centers, promptly filed a federal lawsuit to block construction of the tollway. They also promised to prevent the tollway authority from obtaining environmental approval from federal officials. Ultimately, the lawsuit was settled, and I-355 was opened in 1989 as a tollway between Army Trail Road and I-55 near Bolingbrook. On November 24, 2007, a 12.5 miles (20.1 km) extension of I-355 opened to link I-55 to I-80. Construction of that I-355 extension began after years of delays and environmental litigation.

The Illinois Tollway website officially launched on September 1, 1997. The website includes online ordering of I-Pass transponders and managing I-Pass accounts. In 2009–2010, the website underwent a $4.4 million e-commerce overhaul.

In 2004, ISTHA made a strategic decision to expand the tollway system instead of converting the roads to freeways. It adopted a $6.3 billion Congestion Relief Program. Under the program, the main toll plazas were rebuilt to have open road tolling, so that drivers with transponders would drive at normal speeds under toll collecting equipment instead of stopping to pay tolls. The toll plazas were relocated to the side of the road to handle vehicles without transponders. The plan also included rebuilding and widening many of the toll roads, including most of the original portion of I-88 and the northern and southern sections of I-294. I-355 was extended south of I-55 to connect to I-80 in New Lenox, a distance of 12.5 miles (20.1 km), in order to serve fast-growing areas of Will County. The project also includes adding an interchange between the Tri-State Tollway and I-57. These projects were financed by long-term revenue bonds that require the system to remain as toll roads until the bonds are repaid in 2034.

The Congestion Relief Program was followed by another 15 year capital program named Move Illinois. Approved by ISTHA in 2011, the $14 billion capital program will address the remaining perceived needs of tollway system not addressed by the Congestion Relief Program, as well as construct several new projects. The program is expected to create 120,000 jobs and add $21 billion to the economy. The projects in Move Illinois include reconstructing and widening I-90 between Rockford and the Kennedy Expressway as well as I-294 between Balmoral Ave and 95th Street; new projects include constructing the Elgin-O'Hare Western Access project as well as an interchange between I-294 and I-57 (previously, the Interstates crossed, but had no direct connection).

Legislation passed in 2013 gives the authority the power to build high-speed rail lines if there is funding made available, similar to the authority of other state high-speed rail authorities. It is the only road-related authority with rail construction powers in the United States.

== Structure ==
The Tollway's board of directors has eleven members. The Governor of Illinois and the head of the Illinois Department of Transportation serve as ex officio members of the Tollway Board. The remaining 9 members are named by the governor. No more than 5 appointed members may be of the same political party as the governor. The Authority has the power to collect and raise tolls, and is responsible for the maintenance and construction of tollway roads and related signage (including electronic message boards, used for driving time notices, Amber alerts and other notifications). The Tollway also supervises and manages the four (previously seven) Illinois Tollway oases. The close relationship between the governor and the near-majority of appointed board members has led to numerous allegations of endemic corruption throughout the tollway authority's lifetime.

ISTHA's annual budget for fiscal year 2010 totals $696 million. ISTHA has 1,704 full-time employees, of which 754 are toll collectors. As of July 11, 2019, ISTHA has $6,248,860,000 in bond debt, maturing as late as 2044, which have been rated Aa3, AA− and AA− by Moody's Investors Service, Fitch Ratings and Standard & Poor's, respectively. On May 31, 2019, Moody's Investor Service downgraded ISTHA's bond rating from Aa3 to A1, with a stable outlook. ISTHA has the power to take lands by eminent domain, and ISTHA's employees are subject to conflict of interest laws enacted in 2005.

The Executive Director of ISTHA supervises 12 departments.

The Tollway is patrolled by both police and non-police fleets. The Tollway comprises a separate Illinois State Police District 15, one of 21 districts of the Illinois State Police. ISTHA also operates a fleet of Highway Emergency Lane Patrol vehicles which assist stranded motorists with mechanical problems, flat tires or insufficient fuel. Each year, the H.E.L.P. Trucks assist more than 35,000 motorists and log nearly 1.5 million patrol miles.

=== Toll roads ===
Illinois State Toll Highway System
- Standard highway markers for I-88, US 51, and IL 390
- Map of the Illinois State Toll Highway System

System information
- Maintained by ISTHA
- Length: 306.13 mi (492.67 km)
- Formed: August 20, 1958

Highway names
- Interstates: Interstate X (I-X)
- US Highways: U.S. Route X (US X)
- State: Illinois Route X (IL X)

System links
- Illinois State Highway System; Interstate; US; State; Tollways; Scenic

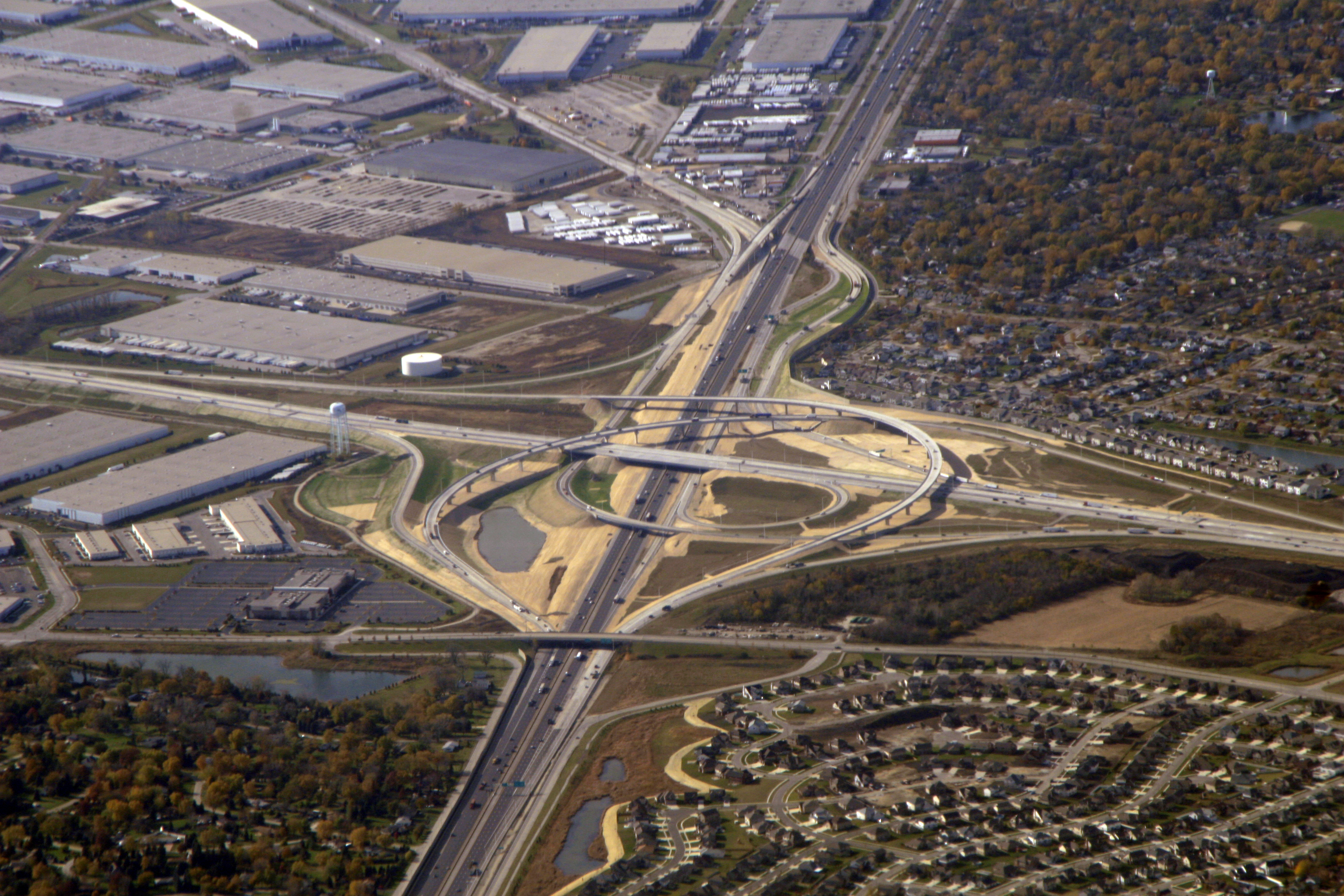
Interchange with I-55, formerly the southern terminus of I-355

As of 2017, ISTHA maintains and operates 306 miles (492 km) of tollways in 12 counties in northern Illinois, comprising five built routes and a sixth one under construction:

- I-39 / I-90 / US 51 (Jane Addams Memorial Tollway)
- I-355 (Veterans Memorial Tollway)
- I-88 / IL 56 (Ronald Reagan Memorial Tollway) / IL 110 (CKC) (Chicago–Kansas City Expressway)
- I-80 / I-94 / I-294 (Tri-State Tollway)
- IL 390 (Elgin-O'Hare Tollway)
- I-490 (Western O'Hare Beltway) (under construction)

Except for the vicinity of O'Hare International Airport, none enter the city of Chicago. The Chicago Skyway, which is owned by the City of Chicago but on a 99-year lease to the Skyway Concession Company, is the only toll road in Illinois that is not operated by ISTHA.

ISTHA was planned to operate tolling for the Longmeadow Parkway bridge that is maintained by Kane County, Illinois, however in January 2024, it was announced the bridge would be toll free.

=== Toll collection ===
ISTHA sets its tolls at a level necessary to maintain and operate the system while retiring its bond debt, and it is required to conduct public hearings on any proposed toll increase. In 1958, the tolls were set at 25 cents at the main plazas and 10 cents at the exit ramps. In 1983, the tolls increased to 40 cents at the main plazas and 15 cents at most ramps. With the advent of the I-Pass system in 2005, the tolls for cash payments were doubled, while rates for cars equipped with I-Pass transponders remained the same. On January 1, 2012, tolls increased by 87 percent, to 75 cents at the main plazas for transponder-equipped cars, and $1.50 for those paying cash. In addition, congestion pricing is used to charge trucks a rate which is $0.50 or $1.00 higher during rush hour than during off-peak hours.

Until the mid-1970s, the Jane Addams Memorial Tollway (then the Northwest Tollway) used a ticket system on the segment between Elgin and Beloit to collect tolls based upon the exact mileage traveled. Drivers were handed a Hollerith card when they entered the segment and paid a toll when they left.

I-Pass is the Illinois Tollway's electronic transponder toll collection system that allows drivers to pre-pay their tolls. As of 2010, Tollway drivers use 3.3 million I-Pass transponders. Every toll lane on the system is equipped to accept I-Pass which can also be used on the Chicago Skyway and anywhere E-ZPass is accepted. (E-ZPass is a transponder consortium of toll road authorities on the East Coast.) A refundable deposit of $10 and $20 in pre-paid tolls is charged at the time of purchase. Illinois Tollway offers an auto-pay replenishment option by registering a credit or debit card to an I-Pass account at the time of activation. Each month, the minimum balance and replenishment amounts are recalculated based on the average usage during the previous six months. A special program for low-income motorists allows them to obtain I-Pass units with a reduced outlay of $20. Users choosing to replenish their account without auto-pay are responsible for monitoring their transactions and balance and must pay a $20 refundable deposit. There are various options for self-pay replenishment, including the Tollway Service Centers located at five oasis rest stops. Customers wishing to pay by check or cash can pay at the oasis customer service centers or can buy $20 I-Pass Gift Cards at Jewel-Osco.

ISTHA has implemented open road tolling, allowing any vehicle with an I-Pass or E-ZPass transponder to continue through the toll plaza at highway speeds while those paying cash have to stop at a tollbooth. If a vehicle registered with I-Pass passes through a toll collection without the transponder, the toll amount will be automatically deducted from the respective I-Pass account. This process is called "V-Tolls" (Video Tolls).

On February 25, 2021, ISTHA announced that cash tolling would be fully eliminated throughout the system, making permanent a moratorium on cash toll collection in place since March 2020 due to the COVID-19 pandemic. Lower-income motorists will be able to acquire an initial deposit-free I-Pass based on income requirements, and ISTHA had already instituted an online pay option for video tolling and pay-by-plate customers without I-Pass or E-ZPass transponders in June 2020 as a response to the pandemic. Plans regarding demolition of the side cash lanes along the tollways (which outside one I-Pass lane now designated to allow users to check their account status by an indicator lamp, are blocked off) are yet to be determined.

== Criticism ==
=== Highway projects ===
ISTHA and the toll highway system in Illinois have undergone much criticism since the 1980s. Construction of the North–South Tollway (I-355) was delayed, in part, due to a dispute with the Morton Arboretum in Lisle, Illinois. Original plans for this toll highway would have seen it constructed through the middle of land belonging to the Arboretum, and closer to the existing Illinois Route 53. Construction on other projects has also been delayed, mostly through protests by area residents.

The Sierra Club criticized the capital projects as adding to urban sprawl while hurting air quality. In response, the expense of implementing Open Road Tolling has justified by claiming it significantly decreases the amount of pollution from vehicle exhaust that enters the air. This is because the old barrier style tollbooths adds to the amount of time that certain vehicles spend on the roadway by requiring them to slow down, stop, and sometimes idle for several minutes while waiting to pay their tolls. The introduction of the I-Pass system has greatly alleviated this problem since all vehicles with an I-Pass or E-Zpass can continue to travel at normal highway speeds through the toll plazas.

=== Continued existence of ISTHA ===
Much of the criticism in the 1980s and 1990s was centered on the continued existence of ISTHA itself, and its quasi-independent status from even the Illinois General Assembly. The original decision to build the tollway was made in an era when five states used toll roads to create a superhighway between New York and Chicago. This predated the Interstate Highway System and the associated funding from federal gasoline taxes. Critics argue that Tollway users are paying twice, first by paying tolls and then by paying the same gasoline taxes that other motorists pay. In addition, the state government originally promised that the tollway system was going to be "Toll Free in '73", once there is enough toll revenue to cover its initial construction bonds; however, this conversion did not happen.

Citizens' groups formed in the 1990s to try to force ISTHA to disband and convert the toll highways in Illinois into freeways. This stems from the 1953 law that established the then Illinois State Toll Highway Commission. By 1999, Governor George Ryan began to publicly discuss the closure of ISTHA and the abolition of toll collection in Illinois, but the plans were eclipsed by Ryan's increasing scandals. After Ryan declined to run for re-election and his successor, Governor Rod Blagojevich, had been elected (but had not yet taken office), the ISTHA board publicly suggested a sudden hike in toll rates that the new Governor could simply blame on his outgoing predecessor. The previous adjustment to Illinois toll rates had taken place in 1983. ISTHA would have been able to raise rates without approval of the Illinois General Assembly because of its quasi-independent nature. However, a rate hike did not go into effect at that time. Ultimately, the toll rates for I-Pass users remained at 1983 prices while the toll rate for cash payers doubled. Practically, the I-Pass system and open road tolling appears to have removed the annoying aspect of toll collection which motivated many toll opponents, and subsequently the calls to ending the tolls have quieted.

=== Corruptions ===
In 2003, during Governor George Ryan's administration, ISTHA entered into a public-private partnership with Wilton Partners to renovate the oasis rest stops in exchange for a 25-year lease. That lease has been the subject of various investigations, including the political connections between food vendors in the oases with former Governor Blagojevich. Ultimately, Wilton Partners' lender foreclosed on the Oases.

On December 9, 2008, Governor Blagojevich was arrested on corruption charges including allegations that he solicited campaign donations from Tollway construction contractors. On December 18, Dalley resigned claiming that Illinois Attorney General Lisa Madigan would not grant waivers from the state ethics law that prohibited high level ISTHA executives from being employed by contractors within a year of leaving office. In January 2009, Governor Blagojevich was impeached, tried, and removed from office for abuse of power, and was succeeded by Lieutenant Governor Pat Quinn. Following this, ISTHA Board appointed a new chief executive without consulting Quinn. On August 12, 2009, John Mitola, who was appointed the ISTHA board chairman in 2003 by Governor Blagojevich, resigned for personal reasons. The next day, Governor Quinn appointed a new chairman and two new board members. Ex-ISTHA Chairman Mitola was reported to have failed to disclose an investment in a real estate development with former state purchasing and contracting CEO Michael Rumman under ousted Governor Blagojevich. In addition, a number of top ISTHA staff members have left in 2009.
