= Watterson Towers =

Residence hall at Illinois State University

Coordinates: 40.508186°N 88.987766°W

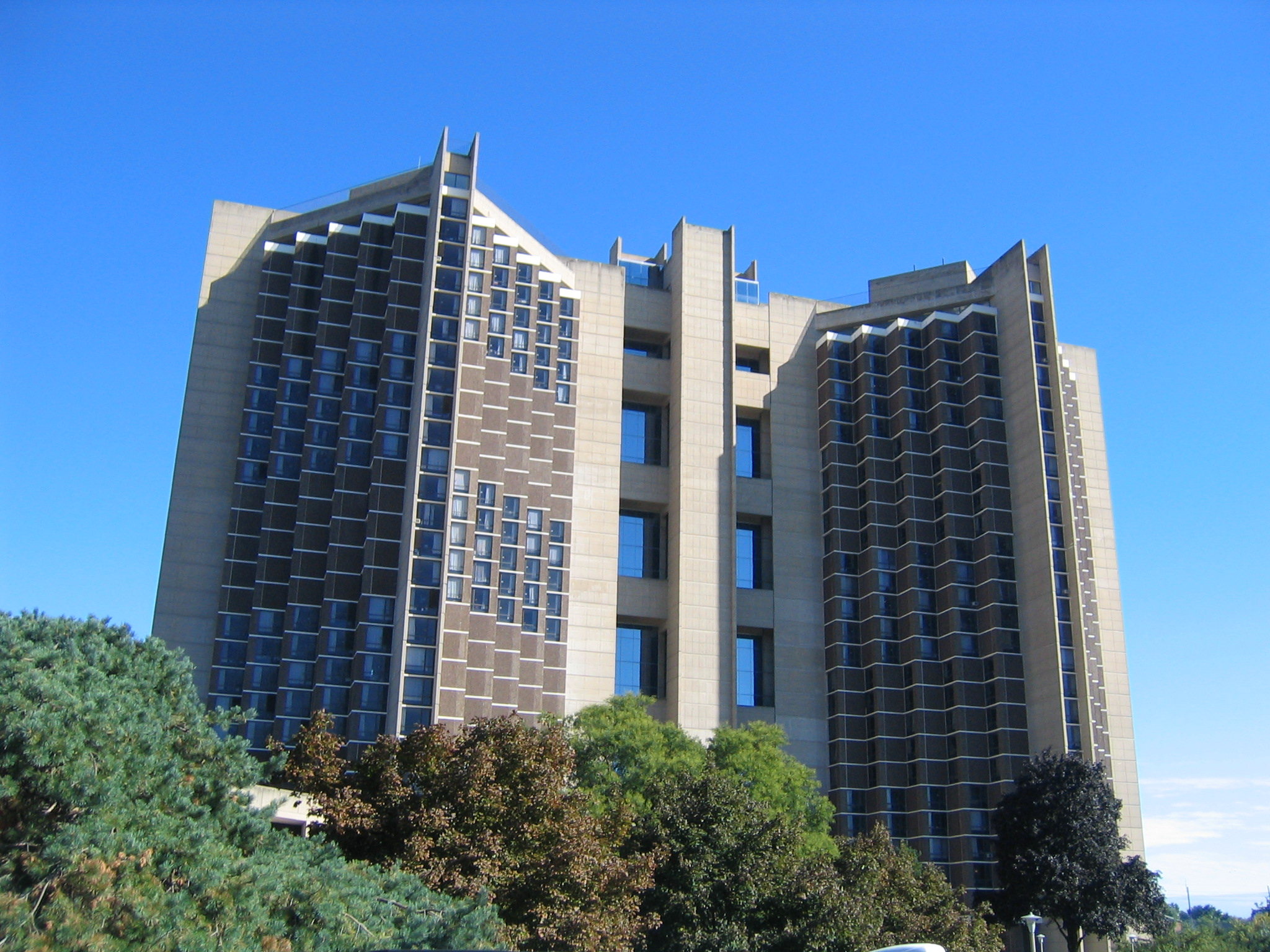
Watterson Towers

Campus View, from the Information

Watterson Towers is a student residence hall at Illinois State University, and is said by the university to be one of the tallest dormitory buildings in the world at 298.5 ft (91.0 m). Located in Normal, Illinois, at the corner of Fell and Beaufort Streets, it was completed in 1969. The 28-story complex holds over 2,200 students and stands at 91m (298.5 feet), making it one of the tallest brutalist structures in the world. Watterson Towers was named after Arthur W. Watterson, a popular professor and chair of the ISU Geography Department, who taught at the University from 1946–1966. The building was designed by Fridstein and Fitch Architects in Chicago, and built by C. Iber and Sons Company of Peoria, Illinois.

Externally, the most noticeable feature of the building is that it consists of two separate towers. From the outside an observer sees that the two towers are connected at several points by breezeways. However, to the residents, this division into towers goes almost unnoticed, as what is far more important is the internal division of the building into houses. Watterson is composed of ten of these houses, (five in each tower), and each is considered—in terms of campus governance—to be its own residence hall. The houses used to be named after the first ten secretaries of state of the United States. As of 2020 each house is now an alphabet letter. A house at the bottom, and E house at the top.

Each "house" consists of five consecutive floors of a tower. Houses at the same level are paired both physically (in terms of access, see below) and in terms of student governance. For example, the bottom five residential floors of the South Tower and the bottom five residential floors of the North Tower comprise "[A North/South]" collectively.

Within each house, most floors are divided into four "suites" consisting of six rooms each. The suites include four double occupancy rooms, a triple room, and a single occupancy room. However, on the middle (third) floor of each house, there are only two suites, as the area for the other two suites is taken up by other things, including the connecting breezeways and some study lounges.

Watterson Towers is the tallest structure in Bloomington-Normal, and can be seen when entering the twin cities from either direction.

== Renovations ==
Watterson Towers, now more than 50 years old, experienced a complete restoration, which was completed using the houses as stages. The food court renovations were completed in 2010, and all work was completed by early 2013.

== Falling incidents ==
=== Student jumps to her death ===
In 1971, a 21-year old ISU student jumped to her death after prying off a mesh screen from the window of her 18th floor room. The Oak Lawn woman's death was the first fatal fall from a high rise building on ISU's campus.

=== Student survives fall from window ===
In 1987, an 18-year-old student was critically injured when she fell from an 18th floor window. The student reported that she had leaned against the interior screen to wave to a friend when the barrier gave way.

=== Halloween trespasser falls to her death ===
On Halloween weekend 2011 a 45-year-old woman attempted to climb the 28 story building by using the scaffolding (being used for renovations) on the east side of the building. Reports say she leaned back on the scaffolding and plummeted 200 feet to her death in front of hundreds of spectators. She was pronounced dead at the scene. The woman was not a student.
