= John W. Clark (architect) =

American architect

John W. Clark is an American architect and planner and a founding partner of the firm Cordogan Clark & Associates. Clark has been recognized for his architectural, planning, and sustainable design work for a series of projects.

== Biography and influences ==
Clark was born in Chicago, Illinois. He studied architecture and planning at the University of Illinois in a program that included study at the École des Beaux-Arts in Versailles, France. He studied art at the Art Institute of Chicago, where he also taught on the faculty. He did postgraduate studies in Infrastructure Technology at Northwestern University. After graduation from the University of Illinois he joined VISTA as an inner city Chicago architect working with inner city neighborhood organizations on schools, public, institutional, and residential projects in 1977. In 1979 he joined Hammond Beeby & Babka where he worked for five years as an architect. In 1984 with John Cordogan he formed the Cordogan, Clark & Associates partnership. In addition to practicing architecture, Clark is a visual artist whose work is included in the collection of the Art Institute of Chicago.https://www.artic.edu/artists/30760/john-w-clark

== Chicago Bridges Design Competition ==
Clark with his firm Cordogan Clark & Associates designed the winning entries for the designs of the 41st and 43rd Street Bridges spanning Lake Shore Drive in Chicago. These placed first among 67 entrants in an international design competition. Called "the state of the art in asymmetrical design" on NPR, Cordogan Clark & Associates teamed with the Chicago-based firm Earthtech to provide structural and civil engineering for these bridges. This pair of bridges will create a gateway for those approaching the city of Chicago from the south.

== Awards ==
Clark has won national and international design and design/ build competitions for a variety of projects. He has completed a projects involving urban planning, municipal design, and historic and contextual design. Recent work includes projects in China. The 41st and 43rd Street Bridges in Chicago received multiple design awards including 2024: National AIA Honor Award for Regional and Urban Design (1); 2023: IDA International Design Award; 2020 (2): Chicago Athenaeum Award; 2019–2020: ENR Midwest (Project of the Year), SEAOI (Best Bridge), ASCE, CMAA, NCSEA, and the National Steel Bridge; and others 3. 4 (sources: 1 https://www.aia.org/design-excellence/award-winners/41st-and-43rd-street-pedestrian-bridges-chicago ; (2) https://www.idesignawards.com/social/zoom.php?eid=9-25624-19https://www.cordoganclark.com/civic/projects_civic_41st_and_43rd_street_bridges.html https://www.cordoganclark.com/municipal/projects_municipal_41st_and_43rd_street_bridges.html.

1212 Larkin (also known as Larkin Place) in Elgin, Illinois has received significant design and preservation awards for its affordable housing and adaptive reuse development including: 2024 Richard H. Driehaus Foundation Preservation Award: Presented by Landmarks Illinois for the adaptive reuse of the historic 1912 Larkin Home for Children. https://www.landmarks.org/preservation-programs/richard-h-driehaus-foundation-preservation-awards/1212-larkin-elgin-2024-award-for-rehabilitation/ 2023 CNU Congress for New Urbanism Charter Award: Awarded by the Congress for the New Urbanism for excellence in urban design, placemaking, and community building https://www.cnu.org/publicsquare/2023/05/17/integrating-new-and-historic-affordable-housing 2023 Mayor's Award for Preservation: Awarded by the City of Elgin.https://www.fccommunities.org/ournews/larkinnews/ 2022 Best Practice Award: Presented by the Illinois Chapter of the American Planning Association (APA-IL) https://www.fccommunities.org/ournews/larkinnews/

Several of Cordogan, Clark and Associates' projects have been recognized for their sustainable aspects, including the Aurora Police Headquarters in Aurora, Illinois and Devon Bank in Wheeling, Illinois, which both received LEED Gold Certification. His work has received awards from The National Society of Arts and Letters, the American Institute of Architects, the Precast Concrete Institute; and has received Community Beautification Awards.

== Juries, teaching, and lectures ==
Clark has served on design award juries for The American Institute of Architects and has been a visiting design juror at the University of Illinois, Illinois Institute of Technology, and at the Art Institute of Chicago, where he has also served on the design faculty. He has also lectured at Tongji University, Shanghai; and at the Huazhong University of Science and Technology, Wuhan, China.
