= I-Pass =

Electronic toll collection system in Illinois

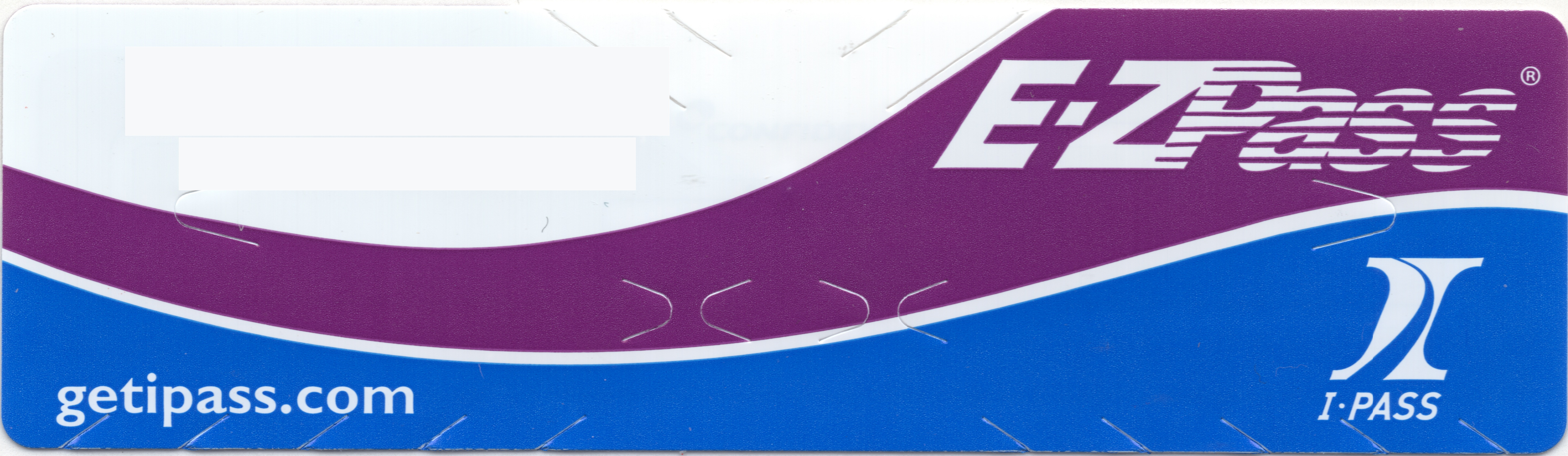
- An I-Pass sticker transponder, introduced in 2024, which is permanently affixed to the vehicle's windshield (the perforations in the sticker will disable the transponder if removed), and does not require replacement for battery expiration.
- Product type: Toll transponder
- Current owner: Illinois Tollway
- Country: United States
- Introduced: November 18, 1993; 32 years ago
- Related brands: E-ZPass
- Markets: Chicago metropolitan area (interoperable on toll roads that accept E-ZPass outside of the Chicago metropolitan area)

I-Pass (stylized as I-PASS) is the electronic toll collection system utilized by the Illinois State Toll Highway Authority (ISTHA) on its toll highways that launched on November 18, 1993, with the opening of Interstate 355 (Veterans Memorial Tollway). It uses the same transponder as the E-ZPass system used in the Northeastern US, the Chicago Skyway, and the Indiana Toll Road, along with the Indiana State Road 912 (Cline Avenue) Indiana Harbor and Ship Canal bridge.

== Usage ==
I-Pass transponders can be used at all toll plazas, including those located on entrance and exit ramps. The main advantage to the system was the eventual withdrawal of full-length tollbooths from the tollway system for full-speed open road tolling, while customers paying cash continued to have to slow down onto exit-like automated tollbooths until the spring of 2020. Likewise, entering or exiting the tollway system with an I-Pass allows continuous movement through the toll gate, albeit at a decelerated speed of 15 miles per hour (24 km/h).

Starting with a toll rate increase which came into effect on January 1, 2005, a significant discount was granted if an I-Pass was used to pay the toll. In June 2005, I-Pass became compatible with toll collection on the Chicago Skyway.

If a vehicle registered with I-Pass passes through a toll collection without the transponder, the vehicle will be considered in violation only if the vehicle's license plate is not registered on an I-Pass account. Each I-Pass account can register multiple vehicles under the account. If a driver does not have a transponder in the car, the license plate still registers under the system as being affiliated with an account and, as long as there are funds in the account, the driver will not be in violation, although if more than three instances occur in a month, the discount will not be granted and each subsequent pass without a transponder will result in the cash fee being deducted from the account. If the driver does not have funds in the account and are not set up for auto refill on a credit card, the toll will be considered unpaid and a $20 fine will be levied, in addition to the cash rate (non-discounted) cost of the toll. Once the license plate holders accrue three violations, they will receive a notice of violation from ISTHA with a demand to pay. I-Pass account holders have a window of time to contact ISTHA and remedy the violation by having the cost of the unpaid toll deducted from their account balance and can have the $20 fee waived. It is up to the account holder to contact ISTHA. If the account holder fails to contact the tollway authority by the due date on their violation notice, additional fines will be levied, eventually leading to having their vehicles plates, drivers license, or both, suspended. Fines have reportedly often escalated into thousands of dollars due to the failure of the account holder to act by contacting ISTHA about the violation.

Users of the system can manage their accounts through the I-Pass web site. Normally, the system will keep a credit balance on account for users, tied to a credit card and replenished as the balance drops below a preset threshold. Alternatively, users can choose to manually replenish their accounts via the site. I-Pass desks at many service plazas on Illinois tollways can also assist system users.

== Tollways and bridges that accept I-Pass ==
All tollways that accept E-ZPass also accept I-Pass.

Controversy surrounded the reciprocal use of I-Pass by Illinois motorists and I-Zoom (now branded as simply E-ZPass) by Indiana motorists on the other state's toll road. Each state charges the other a transaction fee when the out-of-state transponder is used to pay a toll. About 70% of all electronic transactions on the Indiana Toll Road are done with I-Pass transponders, according to Tollway Authority figures. Until January 1, 2010, the fee was absorbed, and I-Pass users paid twice as many Indiana tolls as I-Zoom users paying Illinois tolls. To address this imbalance, ISTHA began charging I-Pass users a three-cent surcharge on each of their Indiana tolls, effective January 1, 2010.

As of September 26, 2005, I-Pass transponders are accepted for the payment of tolls on the E-ZPass system. I-Pass transponders cannot be used to pay for other services such as airport parking where E-ZPass transponders are currently accepted. In the case of older units, only car and motorcycle I-Pass transponders are compatible with the E-ZPass system, and other users with older units (e.g. semi truck operators) must swap their current I-Pass transponder for a transponder compatible with both I-Pass and E-ZPass. (The reverse—use of Northeastern state E-ZPass transponders in I-Pass facilities in Illinois—was actually working as early as May 2005.)

== Privacy concerns ==
In September 2019, NPR radio station WBEZ revealed that the Illinois Tollway had been divulging I-Pass records to lawyers and law enforcement. These records included specific transponder usage instances and personal information about account holders. The Illinois chapter of the ACLU responded negatively to this use of I-Pass data, referring to it as "mission creep".

After reading the WBEZ report, state representative Margo McDermed introduced a bill to prevent the release of tollway records for drivers involved in lawsuits, and to require law enforcement to obtain a warrant to access the records.
