= WDGC-FM =

High school radio station in Downers Grove, Illinois, United States

- Downers Grove, Illinois; United States
- Frequency: 88.3 MHz

Programming
- Format: High school radio

Ownership
- Owner: Downers Grove Community High School District 99

History
- First air date: February 28, 1969
- Call sign meaning: Downers Grove Community

Technical information
- Licensing authority: FCC
- Facility ID: 59285
- Class: A
- ERP: 250 watts horizontal
- HAAT: 40 meters (130 ft)
- Transmitter coordinates: 41°48′16.1″N 88°0′44.2″W

Links
- Public license information: Public file; LMS

WDGC-FM is a high school radio station located in Downers Grove, Illinois. The station is shared between Downers Grove North and Downers Grove South high schools, with the transmitter residing at Downers Grove North. When student DJs are not on the air, a computer program that plays songs on shuffle and inserts station identifications and public service announcements is turned on.

== History ==
WDGC-FM's origins lie in a carrier current station started in 1966. It was then known as WDGN and operated at 600 AM. WDGC-FM was granted a construction permit on November 25, 1968. On February 28, 1969, WDGC-FM began broadcasting with 10 watts of power on 88.3 FM. In 1974, the station's ERP was increased to 250 watts, using a directional antenna to protect nearby stations on adjacent frequencies. In 1997, the old transmitter was replaced with a new Broadcast Electronics transmitter. In 1998, the station purchased digital Pacific Research and Engineering Airwave consoles for both studios. The cart machines at the North studio were replaced with Sony minidisc systems and a non-linear computer based audio editing program.

WDGC-FM was silent from June 1, 2019 to November 14, 2020. In November 2020, the station was fined $1,000 for failing to notify the FCC of its silent status and request authorization to remain silent in a timely fashion, making a false certification on its license renewal application, as well as other violations.
