= Bruce Lindahl (criminal) =

American serial killer

- Born: January 29, 1953; St. Charles, Illinois, U.S.
- Died: April 4, 1981 (aged 28); Naperville, Illinois, U.S.

Details
- Victims: 3 murders confirmed 9+ murders suspected
- Span of crimes: 1974–1981
- Country: United States
- State: Illinois

Bruce Everitt Lindahl (January 29, 1953 – April 4, 1981) was an American serial killer and rapist who committed a series of rapes and murders in the late 1970s and early 1980s. In 2020, Lindahl was connected to the death of 16-year-old Pamela Maurer, who was killed on January 13, 1976, in DuPage County, Illinois. Additionally in 2024, DNA evidence linked him to the murder of Kathy Halle in Illinois in March 1979. He has been declared an official suspect in at least 9 murders and nine rapes committed in different Chicago suburbs from 1974 to 1981.

Lindahl died on April 4, 1981, after police say he accidentally slashed an artery in his leg while stabbing an 18-year-old man to death in an apartment in Naperville. After the details of the circumstances around Lindahl's death was made public, one of his surviving victims contacted the authorities and identified him as her attacker. DuPage County Police later stated that further DNA testing would be conducted with the aid of the Chicago Police Department, to determine whether Bruce Lindahl was involved in at least ten other killings.

== Biography ==
Bruce Everitt Lindahl was born on January 29, 1953, in St. Charles, Illinois, to Jerome and Arlene Lindahl. Lindahl graduated from Downers Grove North High School. He attended college and graduated in the mid-1970s with a degree in electromechanics. The next few years, Lindahl worked as an electrician, while studying additionally at the Midvalley Vocational Center in Kaneville. In his free time, Lindahl was fond of parachuting and racquetball, with his friends and acquaintances speaking positively of him, despite the fact that he easily fell into states of irresistible impulses and occasionally showed aggressive behavior towards others. In December 1976, he was arrested for possession of marijuana, but unbeknownst to law enforcement he had already murdered 5 people, and was let out on bond.

== Criminal history ==
From 1971 onward, Lindahl committed many minor offenses and was repeatedly arrested, but each time, the court gave him only fines. During this time period, he changed residences on several occasions. Over the years, he lived in Chicago and its various suburbs, before moving to Aurora in 1978.

=== Assaults ===
- On March 6, 1979, on the pretext of selling marijuana, Lindahl lured 20-year-old Annette Lazar into his Aurora home, where he raped her under the threat of a gun. He later released her after she gave him feigned consent to continue further intimate relationships, after which Lazar contacted the police. However, since she had left him her phone number and the house where she was raped belonged to police officer Dave Torres, who was a friend of Lindahl, her testimony was reportedly discounted and Lindahl was not charged.
- On December 22, 1980, Lindahl attacked a 30-year-old woman in northern Aurora, after she refused to provide him with sexual services in exchange for money. Since there were several witnesses, Lindahl hurried to leave the scene without causing serious harm to the victim. The injured woman contacted police, and during the interrogation was presented with photographs of various criminals for visual identification. As Lindahl was not among them, the victim instead picked out another man with a similar appearance.
- On January 28, 1981, Lindahl was convicted of illegally tapping and recording other people's phone calls to extort them. While they were trying to detain him, he aimed a shotgun at a police officer. After his arrest, he was charged with resisting arrest, illegal possession of weapons, and assault, but was again released on bail, and remained free during the preliminary investigation.
- On an unspecified date, Lindahl was driving when he was pulled over by the police. The police discovered an unconscious woman bleeding from a deep gash in her head. They asked him what he was doing, and he claimed that he was taking her to the hospital, although he was going in the wrong direction. An ambulance took the woman to the hospital, where an examination revealed she had been sexually assaulted. The woman stated that she did not remember what happened after Lindahl gave her a sip of something at a party. No charges were filed.

=== Confirmed and suspected murders ===
- On January 12, 1976, the body of 16-year-old Pamela Maurer was found behind a guardrail; she had been raped and strangled. Maurer was a junior at Downers Grove South High School who had gone to a friend's house in Lisle, Illinois on the night of January 12, 1976. At 9:45 p.m., Pamela went out to buy a soda at a nearby McDonald's but she never returned. The next day, a passer-by noticed a purse with Pamela's identification and alerted the authorities when her body was found. In 1993, the investigation of the cold case was resumed. In September 2019, the case was reopened once more, as advances in technology allowed the suspect's DNA to be isolated. Using public genealogy sites, it was revealed that it matched with one of Lindahl's relatives. In 2019, his body was exhumed and his DNA was obtained. In January 2020, he was officially tied via that DNA evidence to the Maurer murder.

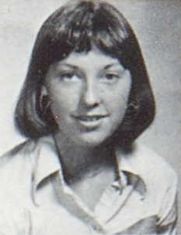
Kathy Halle, pictured in 1977

- On April 24, 1979, the body of 19-year-old Kathy Halle was discovered in the Fox River near North Aurora after she had been missing for almost a month. In October 2024, police used new DNA techniques to link Lindahl to the murder and concluded that he was responsible for the death of Halle.
- While inspecting his apartment, several photographs of young girls were located by authorities, including one that is believed to be that of 16-year-old Deborah McCall. Deborah was last seen in Downers Grove, Illinois on November 5, 1979. She left Downers Grove North High School that day and has never been heard from again. Investigators believe that Lindahl was involved in her disappearance.
- On June 23, 1980, Lindahl abducted 25-year-old Debra Colliander from the parking lot of a shopping center in Aurora, Illinois. He took her to his apartment, where he raped Colliander before she escaped after he fell asleep. She notified police, and this time, he was arrested and charged. However, Lindahl paid his bail and was released. On October 7, Debra Colliander went missing after leaving work, and the trial, which was supposed to take place in 1981, was canceled, due to the absence of the key witness. Subsequently, all charges were dropped. In 1982, the decomposing body of Colliander was located in an Oswego cornfield. Soon after, a man contacted the Aurora police, claiming that Lindahl had offered him a monetary reward in exchange for killing Colliander to prevent her from testifying at trial, which led investigators to place Lindahl as the prime suspect, as he had a clear motive to commit the murder.
- On April 4, 1981, while cruising around in one of the shopping and entertainment districts of Naperville, Lindahl met 18-year-old Charles Robert “Chuck” Huber Jr. After playing some ten-pin bowling together, Lindahl suggested that they to go to Lindahl's ex-girlfriend's apartment, to which Huber agreed. That same evening, when they arrived in the apartment, Lindahl attacked Huber with a knife, fatally stabbing him a total of 28 times. During the attack, however, Huber resisted, causing Lindahl to accidentally stab himself in the thigh, severing his own femoral artery. This resulted in heavy bleeding from which Lindahl died, collapsing over his victim.

Murder in the Fox Valley: The True Story of Serial Killer Bruce Lindahl by Jim Ridings was published in 2022. Ridings was the reporter for the Aurora Beacon-News whose articles exposed Lindahl for the first time in 1980. Aurora police said Lindahl planned to kill Ridings once the court charges were dropped but Lindahl accidentally killed himself while murdering Charles Huber, four days after the charges were dismissed.

== See also ==
- List of serial killers in the United States
- Robert Eugene Brashers, American posthumously-discovered serial killer and rapist
