= Center Cass School District 66 =

School district in Illinois, United States

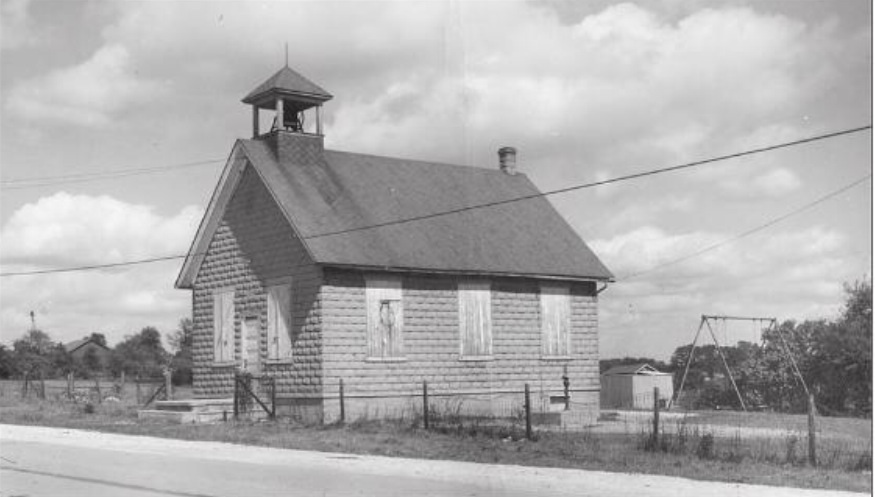
- The Center Cass School from 1915

Address
- 699 Plainfield Road Downers Grove, Illinois, 60516; United States
- Coordinates: 41.735886°N 88.010212°W

District information
- Type: Public
- Grades: PreK–8
- NCES District ID: 1708970

Students and staff
- Students: 1,109 (2020–2021)

Other information
- Website: www.ccsd66.org

Center Cass School District 66 is a public school district located in Downers Grove, Illinois, in DuPage County. The district serves about 1,300 students in grades K-8.

Center Cass District 66 currently consists of Elizabeth Ide School (grades K-2), Prairieview Elementary School (grades 3-5) and Lakeview Jr. High School (grades 6-8). These elementary and junior high schools each feed into Downers Grove South High School (Community High School District 99). Center Cass School District is named after Center Cass School, which was once a part of the district. Prairieview School was built to replace Center Cass through 1999-2000.

== Center Cass School ==
The original Center Cass School was a one-room wooden structure located at Brookeridge. The wooden school burned in 1913 and a one-room concrete replacement was built. In 1915, the count of students and teachers was sixteen. During this period Elizabeth Ide was a teacher. She brought eight gallons of water to school from her house each day because the school's water supply was contaminated. Later, she became the principal. Some of the original foundation of the schoolhouse can still be found today.

In 1951, the last Center Cass School was built. The school was designed by Legat architects and was made to have prairie style architecture. It was extended three times. In 1955 two more rooms were added, in 1960 the gym and classrooms across the gym were added and in 1966 six more classrooms were added. Until 1970 it served grades K-8, when it was replaced by Elizabeth Ide School. Prior to 1970, in 1968 and 1969, some classes were held in a church (Cass Community Church) on Cass Avenue because there was not enough room for everyone at the school.

== Prairieview Elementary School ==
Prairieview was built because Center Cass School was too small and had many issues. At Center Cass the gym was used for physical education and band room in the morning, lunch room in the middle of the day, and a hallway to the other side of the building, where classrooms were located. The library was spread out and not very organized, while the teacher's lunchroom was in the basement where the craft supplies were stored. There was no storage space and many teachers including the band director had to teach in a closet. In 1999, District 66 sold the Center Cass School property and built Prairieview School, which opened in August 2000. Legat architects designed the school to also have prairie style architecture. They incorporated some features from Center Cass School, including windows above the classrooms and a shallowly sloped roof. South Grove Park was supposed to be the building site, but the people voted against it 3 times, so it was moved next to Lakeview.

The school currently holds grades 3 through 5. Names for the school were suggested by the students and The Board of Education chose Prairieview. The school's name for teams, Prairieview Panthers, was chosen by students in a contest.

== Lakeview Jr. High School ==
The district established a Junior High school because Center Cass School was overcrowded and did not meet accessibility requirements, lacking an elevator. Construction on Lakeview began in 1974 and it opened in February 1975. The school was designed by F.G.M architects. Its name came from the fact that it is located across the street from Bruce Lake. The school's team name is Lakeview Spartans. Originally built on the "Open School" concept without interior walls and almost no windows, Lakeview has been remodeled several times to add walls, locker banks, another gym, science labs, applied technology STEM room and an improved computer lab, a new administrative office and windows in exterior wall classrooms.

== Demographics ==
The District has an enrollment of about 1,115 students as of the 2010–2011 school year, including 71.2% Caucasians, 3.9% African Americans, 6.6% Hispanic, 9.9% Asian, 0.1% Native Hawaiian or Pacific Islander, 0.1% American Indian, and 8.2% of two or more other races. Although new homes have been constructed in the District since 2011, enrollment has not increased and, as of Fiscal Year 2022, dropped to 1,084 (for details and trends, see https://www.illinoisreportcard.com/District.aspx?source=studentcharacteristics&source2=enrollment&Districtid=19022066002).

== Superintendent ==
Superintendent Dr. Jay Tiede retired in 2012 after 39 years of working in the district. He was replaced by Dr. Tim Arnold, who graduated from Illinois State University with a bachelor's degree in Special Education. He earned his master's degree in Educational Leadership at ISU. In July 2019 Tim Arnold resigned as superintendent and was replaced during the 2019-2020 school year by two interim superintendents, Dr. Ray Lechner and Dr. Griff Powell, who served until the hiring of a permanent replacement superintendent, Dr. Andrew Wise, in July 2020.
