= Classic Cinemas =

American movie theater chain

- Type: Subsidiary
- Founded: 1978; 48 years ago
- Founder: Willis Johnson; Shirley Johnson
- Headquarters: Downers Grove, Illinois, U.S.
- Number of locations: 16 theaters with 141 screens
- Key people: Chris Johnson (CEO)
- Parent: Tivoli Enterprises
- Website: www.classiccinemas.com

Classic Cinemas is an American movie theatre chain. Headquartered in Downers Grove, Illinois, it operates 16 locations with 141 screens in Illinois and Wisconsin under Tivoli Enterprises ownership. Its first theatre and company namesake is the restored Tivoli Theatre, in Downers Grove, Illinois.

== History ==
Classic Cinemas was founded in 1978 by Willis and Shirley Johnson, when after the previous operators of the Tivoli Theater, located in the Tivoli building owned by the Johnsons abandoned the theater, they decided to step in and run the theater themselves after they were unable to find another operator. Throughout the 1980s and 1990s, the company continued to grow by purchasing historical single screen downtown theaters, restoring and adding additional screens to the complexes. Classic Cinemas was awarded the Landmarks Illinois Richard H. Driehaus Foundation Preservation Award for “Stewardship” in 2011.

During a period in the 1980s when some major films were released with 70mm prints for select theatres, Classic Cinemas (then under the Tivoli Enterprises name) featured these wide-gauge prints at their flagship Tivoli Theatre for bargain prices once they had ended their first-run engagements. This might be the only example of a "sub run" theatre showing films in that format.

Classic Cinemas finished its technology overhaul in 2012 installing Christie CP4230 projectors, GDC SX2000AR servers, and Datasat AP-20 audio processors. Now all screens have 4K, High Frame Rate (HFR), personal captioning devices, descriptive narration, and hearing impaired systems. They are also installing micro-perforated screens for the ultimate picture quality. All theatres and auditoriums are equipped 7.1 sound. The chain has also introduced XQ, a Premium large format, along with installing power recliners at every location.

== Locations ==
- Beloit Theater in Beloit, Wisconsin, 10 screens
- Charlestowne 18 in St. Charles, Illinois, 18 screens
- Carpentersville 12 in Carpentersville, Illinois, 12 screens
- Elk Grove Theatre in Elk Grove Village, Illinois, 10 screens
- Fox Lake Theatre in Fox Lake, Illinois, 13 screens
- Kendall 11 in Oswego, Illinois, 11 screens
- La Grange Theatre in La Grange, Illinois, 9 screens
- Lake Theatre in Oak Park, Illinois, 7 screens
- Lindo Theatre in Freeport, Illinois, 9 screens
- Meadowview Theatre in Kankakee, Illinois, 7 screens
- North Riverside Luxury 6 in North Riverside, Illinois, 6 screens
- Paramount Theatre in Kankakee, Illinois, 5 screens
- Sandwich 7 in Sandwich, Illinois, 7 screens
- Tivoli Theatre in Downers Grove, Illinois, 2 screens
- Woodstock Theatre in Woodstock, Illinois, 8 screens
- York Theatre in Elmhurst, Illinois, 10 screens

=== Former locations ===
- Arcada Theater and Foxfield Theater (closed 2001) in St. Charles, Illinois
- Barrington Square Theaters (closed October 2000) in Hoffman Estates, Illinois
- Casino Cinema at Grand Victoria Casino Elgin (closed 2002) in Elgin, Illinois
- Hinsdale Theater (closed 1990) in Hinsdale, Illinois
- Ogden 6 (closed June 7, 2020) in Naperville, Illinois, 6 screens
- Park Forest Theater (closed in 2004, later became Holiday Star Theater, theatre closed in 2013) in Park Forest, Illinois
- Spring Hill Mall Theaters (closed April 17, 1998) in West Dundee, Illinois
- Sterling Theater in Sterling, Illinois
- Tivoli South (closed 2001) in Downers Grove, Illinois
- Tradewinds Cinemas 1 & 2 (closed 2002) in Hanover Park, Illinois
