= Scott Daly =

American football player (born 1994)

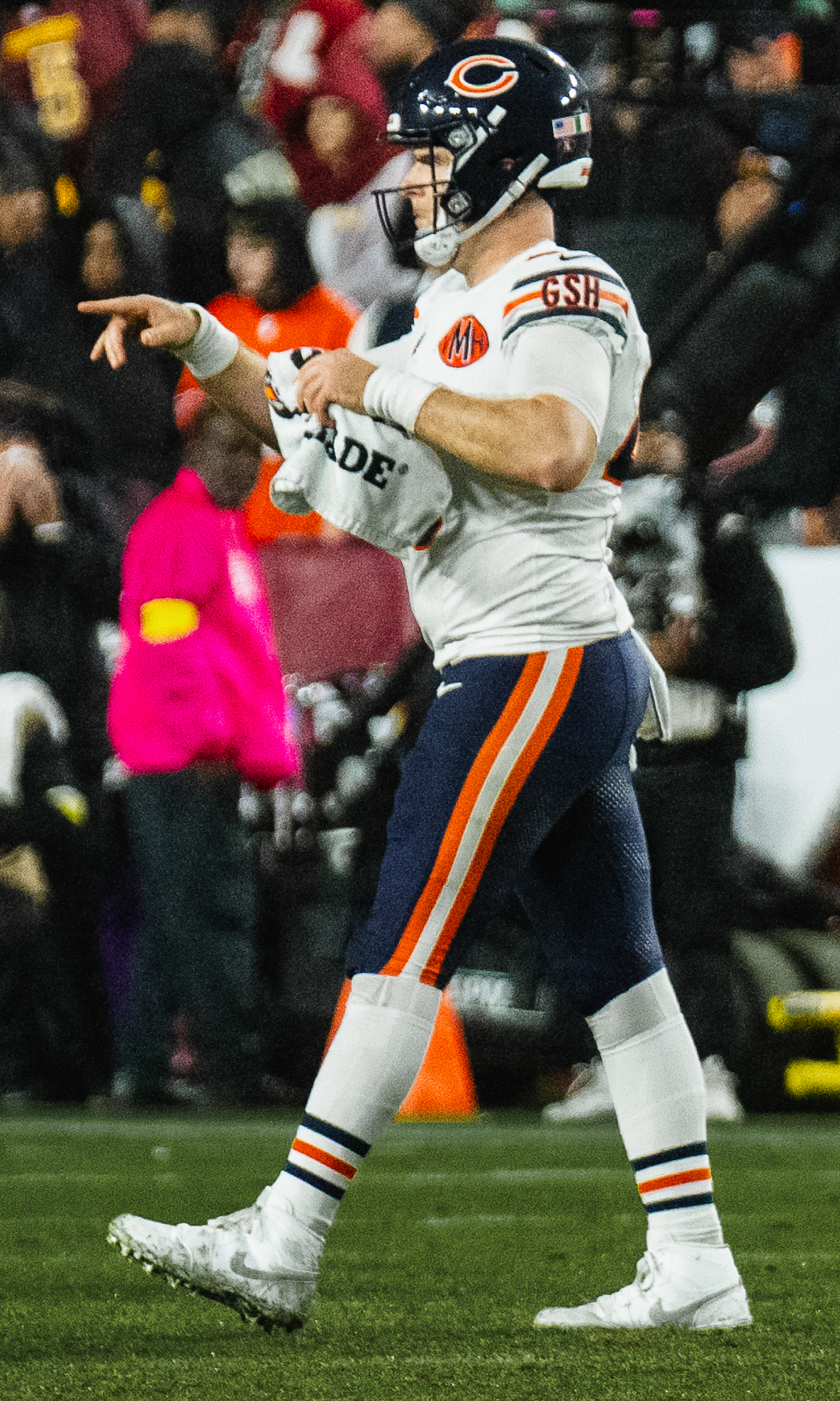
- Daly with the Chicago Bears in 2025

No. 46 – Chicago Bears
- Position: Long snapper
- Roster status: Active

Personal information
- Born: February 7, 1994 (age 32); Downers Grove, Illinois, U.S.
- Listed height: 6 ft 2 in (1.88 m)
- Listed weight: 248 lb (112 kg)

Career information
- High school: Downers Grove South
- College: Notre Dame (2012–2016)
- NFL draft: 2017: undrafted

Career history
- Dallas Cowboys (2018)*; San Antonio Commanders (2019); New York Guardians (2020); Detroit Lions (2021–2023); Chicago Bears (2024–2025); Tampa Bay Buccaneers (2026)*; Green Bay Packers (2026)*; New Orleans Saints (2026); Chicago Bears (2026–present)
- * Offseason or practice squad member only

Career NFL statistics as of Week 8, 2026
- Games played: 83
- Total tackles: 9
- Fumble recoveries: 1
- Stats at Pro Football Reference

Scott Daly (born February 7, 1994) is an American professional football long snapper for the Chicago Bears of the National Football League (NFL). He played college football for the Notre Dame Fighting Irish.

== Early life ==
Daly began long snapping in the fifth grade. He attended Downers Grove South High School. He played tight end and also handled the team's long-snapping duties. As a junior, he received All-conference and honorable-mention All-area honors at tight end. He is of Irish descent.

As a senior, he scored his first career touchdown in the season opener. He was named the national high school long snapper of the year and was ranked the number one long snapper in the nation by Scout.com. In April 2011, he committed to the University of Notre Dame.

== College career ==
Daly accepted a football scholarship from the University of Notre Dame. As a freshman in 2012, he did not see any action behind Jordan Cowart.

As a sophomore in 2013, he was named the team's long snapper for all 13 games. He posted 2 special teams tackles. As a junior in 2014, he was perfect on 127 snapping opportunities.

As a senior in 2015, he started all 13 games, accumulating 39 straight over his first three seasons. He was perfect on 126 snapping opportunities and contributed to Justin Yoon freshman All-American season. On October 31 against Temple University, he posted his first special teams tackle since 2013. On November 21, he recovered a fumble on a muffed punt at the 4-yard line in a game against Boston College. He also was recognized for his work in sending supplies to the Dominican Republic. He played a total of 39 games during his college career.

== Professional career ==
Pre-draft measurables
Height	Weight	Arm length	Hand span	Wingspan	40-yard dash	10-yard split	20-yard split	20-yard shuttle	Three-cone drill	Vertical jump	Broad jump	Bench press
6 ft 2 in (1.88 m)	248 lb (112 kg)	32 1/4 in (0.82 m)	9 5/8 in (0.24 m)	6 ft 7 in (2.01 m)	5.11 s	1.72 s	2.91 s	4.47 s	7.47 s	27.0 in (0.69 m)	9 ft 0 in (2.74 m)	20 reps
All values from Pro Day

Daly was not selected in the 2017 NFL draft. He instead received an invitation for a rookie minicamp tryout with the Chicago Bears in May. The Bears decided against signing him to a contract and Daly spent the 2017 season out of football.

=== Dallas Cowboys ===
On April 16, 2018, Daly signed as a free agent with the Dallas Cowboys. On September 1, he was waived, after not being able to pass stalwart starter L.P. Ladouceur on the depth chart.

=== San Antonio Commanders ===
On October 26, 2018, Daly signed with the San Antonio Commanders of the Alliance of American Football. He played with the team until the league ceased operations in April 2019.

=== New York Guardians ===
In October 2019, Daly was selected by the New York Guardians of the XFL in the open phase of the 2020 XFL draft. He had his contract terminated when the league suspended operations on April 10, 2020.

=== Detroit Lions ===
On May 4, 2021, Daly signed as a free agent with the Detroit Lions. He earned the long snapper job during the preseason after passing 17-year veteran Don Muhlbach on the depth chart. During the 2024 training camp, Daly was informed that rookie Hogan Hatten passed him on the depth chart, ultimately leading to Daly’s release.

=== Chicago Bears ===
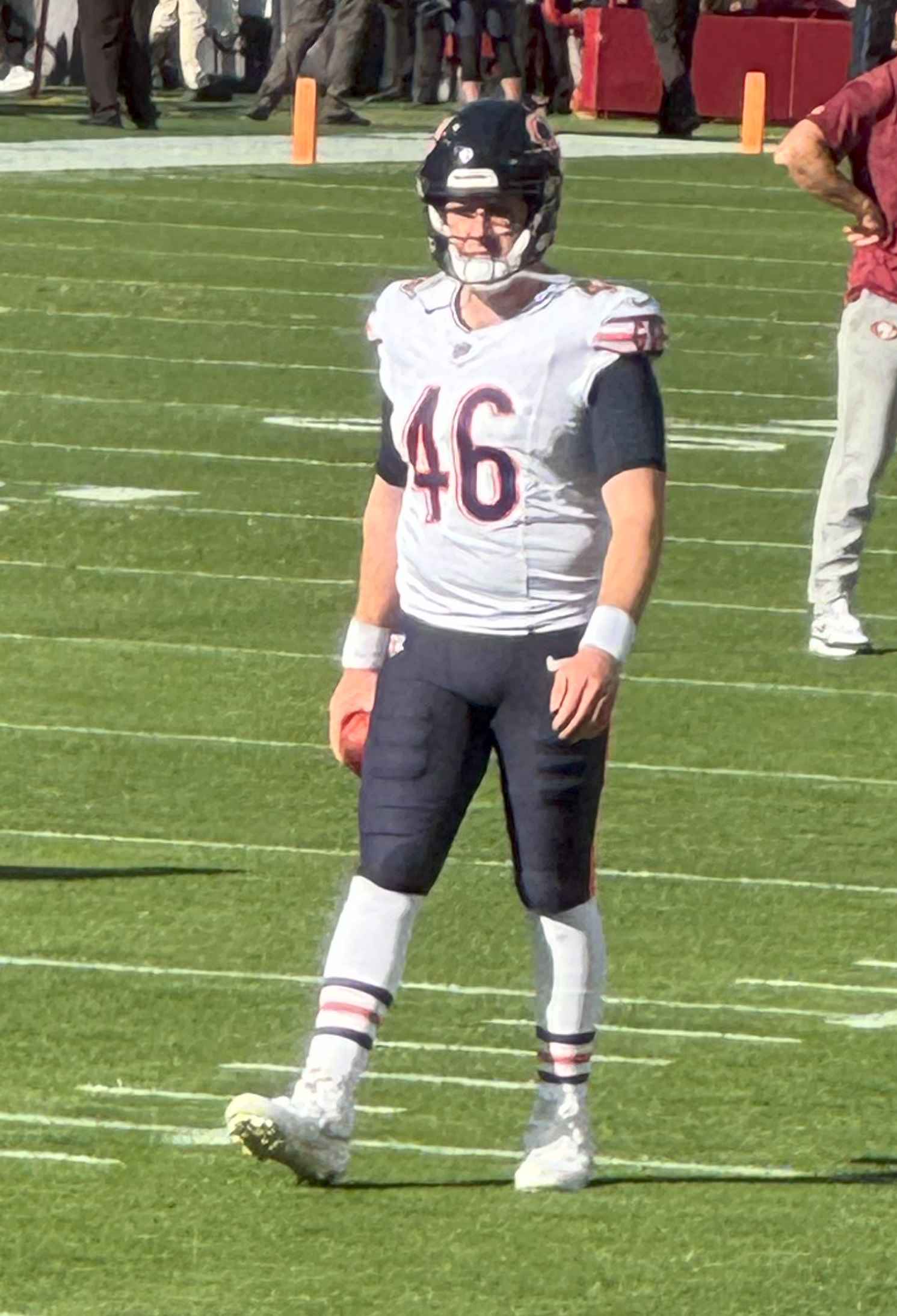
Daly with the Bears in 2024

On August 29, 2024, Daly was signed to the Chicago Bears' practice squad. He was promoted to the active roster on September 14 and started in lieu of the injured Patrick Scales. Daly would start all 17 of Chicago's games during the regular season.

On August 27, 2025, Daly was released by Chicago as part of final roster cuts; he was re-signed to the team's active roster the following day.

=== Tampa Bay Buccaneers ===
On May 11, 2026, Daly signed with the Tampa Bay Buccaneers. He was waived by the Buccaneers on August 30.

=== Green Bay Packers ===
On September 2, 2026, Daly was signed to the Green Bay Packers' practice squad. He was released by the Packers on September 14.

=== New Orleans Saints ===
On September 18, 2026, Daly was signed to the New Orleans Saints' practice squad. Daly was elevated to the active roster and played long snapper for the Saints in their September 20 victory against the Baltimore Ravens. He was due to return to the practice squad after the game before being signed by the Bears.

=== Chicago Bears (second stint) ===
Daly was signed to the Chicago Bears' active roster on September 22, 2026. Although the Bears favored rookie Beau Gardner to begin the regular season, Gardner's struggles and Daly's familiarity with Bears kicker Cairo Santos and holder Tory Taylor prompted the decision to re-sign him.
