= Charlestowne Mall =

Defunct shopping mall in Illinois, US

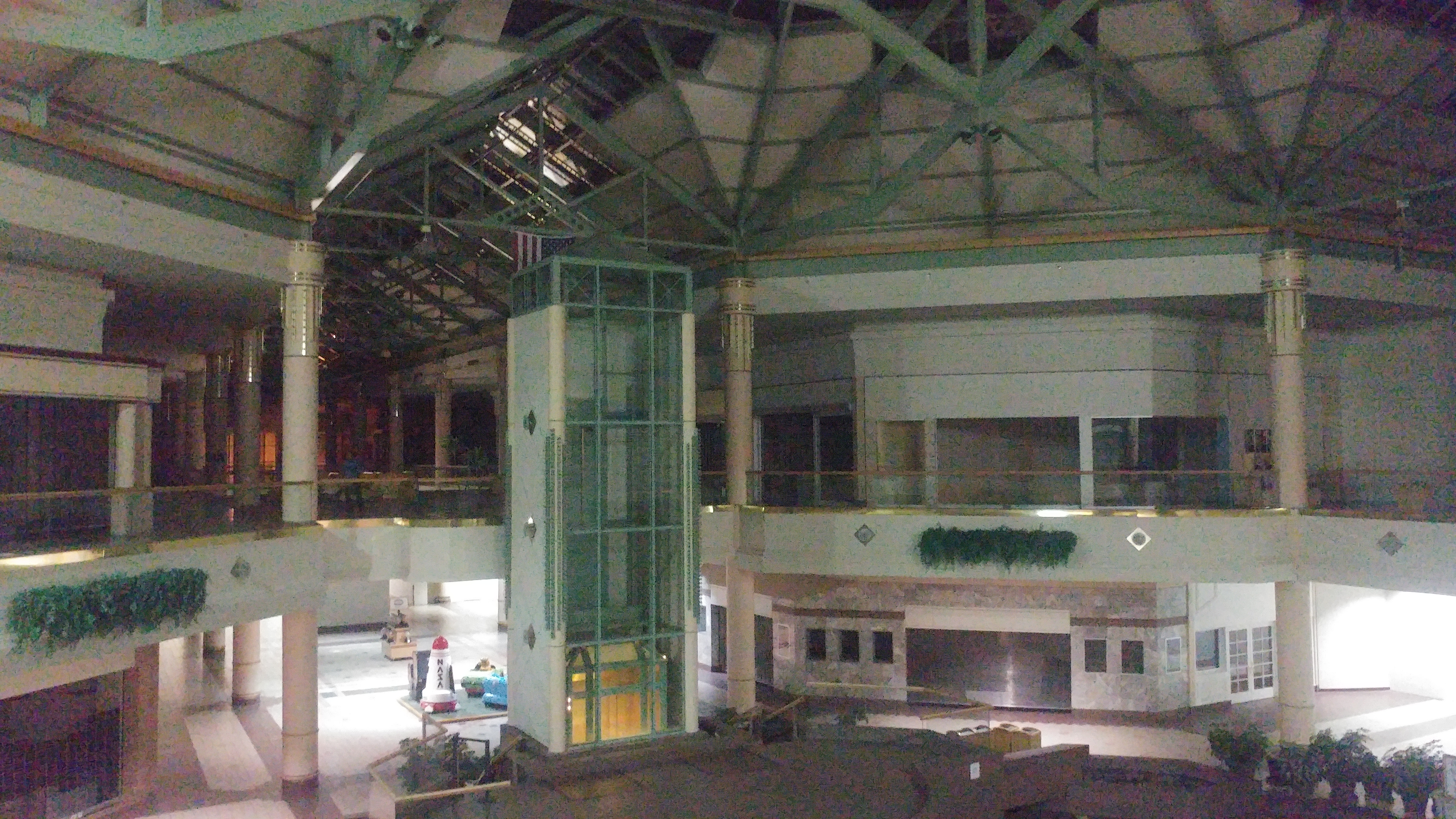
- The interior of Charlestowne Mall on its final day in business.
- Location: St. Charles, Illinois, United States
- Coordinates: 41°55′24.5″N 88°16′9″W
- Address: 3800 East Main Street
- Opened: August 15, 1991
- Closed: December 1, 2017
- Previous names: Charlestowne Centre Mall
- Developer: Wilmorite Properties
- Manager: Krausz Company
- Owner: Krausz Company
- Num. of stores: 120
- Num. of anchor tenants: 5 (2 open, 3 vacant)
- Floor area: 1,100,000 sq ft (100,000 m^{2})
- Floors: 2
- Parking: 4,200

Charlestowne Mall was a shopping mall located in St. Charles, Illinois, United States. It was the second mall to serve the city after St. Charles Mall. Built by Wilmorite Properties, Charlestowne Mall opened for business in August 1991. Its original anchor stores were Kohl's, JCPenney, Sears, and Carson's (then known as Carson Pirie Scott). Regal Cinemas added a movie theater in 1999 which was sold to Classic Cinemas two years later, while JCPenney closed in 2000 and was converted in 2001 to Von Maur. The mall began experiencing a decline in tenancy in the 21st century due to its size, its location, and the opening of Geneva Commons in Geneva, Illinois in 2002. Although Wilmorite sold most of its shopping malls to Macerich in 2005, Charlestowne Mall was not included in the sale; it then changed ownership multiple times, with many of the following owners announcing plans to renovate it. None of these plans were executed, and many stores closed over time, including Sears in 2011 and Kohl's in 2016. The mall was entirely closed in 2017 except for the movie theater, Von Maur, and Carson's, which itself closed a year later. The vacant mall is owned by Urban Street Group.

== History ==
Wilmorite Properties, a shopping mall developer based in suburban Rochester, New York, first announced the plans for Charlestowne Mall in 1989. The developers chose a site east of St. Charles, Illinois, on Illinois Route 64. The plans called for a two-story shopping mall spanning more than 1,000,000 square feet (93,000 m^{2}) with three anchor stores: JCPenney, Sears, and Carson Pirie Scott and Company (later known as Carson's). Charlestowne Mall would be Wilmorite's first development outside the state of New York. Wilmorite chose the location due to projected residential growth in DuPage and Kane counties, the two counties in which the city of St. Charles is located.

The first store at the mall to open was Sears on April 2, 1991. Sears' store was opened ahead of the rest of the mall due to it having already been stocked with merchandise. Wilmorite delayed opening of the mall and Carson's until August 1991, and JCPenney did not open until early 1992. John R. Kraus, then a representative of Wilmorite, stated that the delay was due to company concerns about the nation's economy after the Gulf War; he also thought that delaying the mall's opening would allow it to benefit from back to school sales. Sears advertised the store by mailing flyers to over 61,000 area residents who held Sears credit cards at the time. Carson's held a ribbon-cutting ceremony to open its store, their 24th store in the Chicago area, on August 15, 1991. At the time, Carson's parent company Bergner's was undergoing financial restructuring following debt accrued in the acquisition of the Carson's chain in 1989; although this caused issues in delayed shipments to several Carson's and Bergner's stores, the Charlestowne Mall store was not affected. The rest of the mall opened in phases between 1991 and 1992, by which point Kohl's had been added as a fourth anchor store. Other features of the mall upon opening included a two-level carousel and a food court.

=== Mid-late 1990s: After opening ===
The opening of Charlestowne Mall had an immediate impact on St. Charles Mall, an existing shopping center in St. Charles. This mall was entirely vacated in 1995 after its anchor stores Kmart and Joseph Spiess Company had closed and was demolished in 2002. By comparison, business owners in downtown St. Charles stated that they did not consider the mall as competition as the downtown business district mostly consisted of businesses not typical of malls, such as antique shops. Residents of the Charlemagne subdivision just north of the mall submitted plans to the city of St. Charles to block a mall entrance that aligned with one of the streets in the subdivision, due to motorists using the main road through the subdivision as a shortcut to the mall. These plans were unsuccessful.

In 1994, Wilmorite began negotiations with several chains to build a fifth anchor store on the northwest corner. Among the retailers considered were Jacobson's, Von Maur, Parisian, and Lord & Taylor. In addition, Carson's submitted plans to expand its store in order to include more departments not already present, such as housewares and men's shoes. Wilmorite also submitted plans to build a Toys "R" Us outside the mall. The Toys "R" Us had its grand-opening on November 19 1994. Nine business owners within the mall attempted to file a lawsuit against Wilmorite in 1997, claiming fraud and misrepresentation of contract. Among the businesses were a local clothing store called Kids Asylum and a cinnamon roll vendor called Cindy's Cinnamon Rolls, both of which had already closed at the time. Under this lawsuit, the former owners of these stores claimed that Wilmorite had promised "upscale" stores such as Crate & Barrel which never materialized. Although an attorney representing the businesses in question estimated the mall to be about fifteen percent vacant, Wilmorite executives refused to reveal how much of the mall had been leased. The lawsuit was never finalized. Regal Cinemas built a movie theater at the mall in 1999, taking the northwest corner of the mall which was originally planned for a fifth anchor store.

JCPenney closed its store at Charlestowne Mall in 2000 due to low sales. Its former location was sold that same year to Von Maur. The location was Von Maur's second in the Chicago market after Yorktown Center in Lombard. John Anderson, then the chief executive officer of Wilmorite, said at the time that the addition of Von Maur had the potential to bring more "upscale" stores to the mall. The store was slightly larger than the former location of JCPenney, as Von Maur also assumed mall space previously occupied by a shoe store and a beauty salon. After renovation, Von Maur opened in early 2001. As a condition of opening Von Maur, Wilmorite received a $9 million sales tax rebate from the city of St. Charles. In addition, Eddie Bauer and Noodle Kidoodle opened at the mall in 2000. Initially, Eddie Bauer's agreement with Wilmorite stated that they would open a store at the mall if Wilmorite successfully opened Von Maur; Eddie Bauer representatives later stated that they decided to open at the mall regardless of Von Maur's involvement, due to a large number of customers from the area who ordered from the company's catalog or website. Other stores that opened leading up to Von Maur's opening included Whitehall Jewelers, Gymboree, and footwear store Athletic Attic. Target also built a store across from the mall in 2001.

=== Decline ===
After only two years in business, the mall's movie theater was sold to Classic Cinemas, a theater company based in Downers Grove, Illinois. The company closed the theater from July to October 2001 in order to renovate it with new signage. As a result of this acquisition, Classic Cinemas owned all three movie theaters serving the city of St. Charles at the time. In 2002, several new tenants opened at the mall. These included Zumiez, Champs Sports, Zales, Sam Goody, and Hollister Co. In addition, American Eagle Outfitters expanded its store, and Claire's relocated to the former location of Afterthoughts, which it acquired that year. A year later, a children's play place was added at center court.

Despite these additions, the mall faced competition against Geneva Commons, a lifestyle center which opened in nearby Geneva, Illinois in 2002. Wilmorite sold most of its shopping malls to Macerich in December 2004 in order to put a greater focus on properties in the Rochester, New York area. Of the fifteen malls owned by Wilmorite at the time, neither Charlestowne Mall nor Westshore Mall (now The Shops at Westshore) in Holland, Michigan was included in the sale. At the time of the sale, Charlestowne Mall had an occupancy rate of about 88 percent. Sue Klinkhamer, then the mayor of St. Charles, told the Arlington Heights Daily Herald at the time of the sale that she thought that Wilmorite did not market the mall successfully, due to its distance from the company's headquarters in New York state. By 2006, the mall was described by the same publication as having "more than a third" of its stores empty. Among the closures were Sam Goody and Casual Corner, both of which went out of business entirely, and Lane Bryant, which was one of several stores to relocate to Geneva Commons. John Melaniphy of the Chicago-based retail analyst firm Melaniphy and Associates Inc., also attributed the mall's decline to it being too big for the market, as well as its distance from major freeways in the area and increased competition from big-box stores that had opened throughout St. Charles in the interim. Despite its decline, the mall was sold in 2005 to Midland Loan Services, which hired Urban Retail Properties to manage the property. In addition, Von Maur extended its lease. Urban Retail sold management rights to McKinley Properties in August 2007. McKinley executives began considering redevelopment plans by year's end; one such plan was to convert the property to a lifestyle center format akin to that of Geneva Commons.

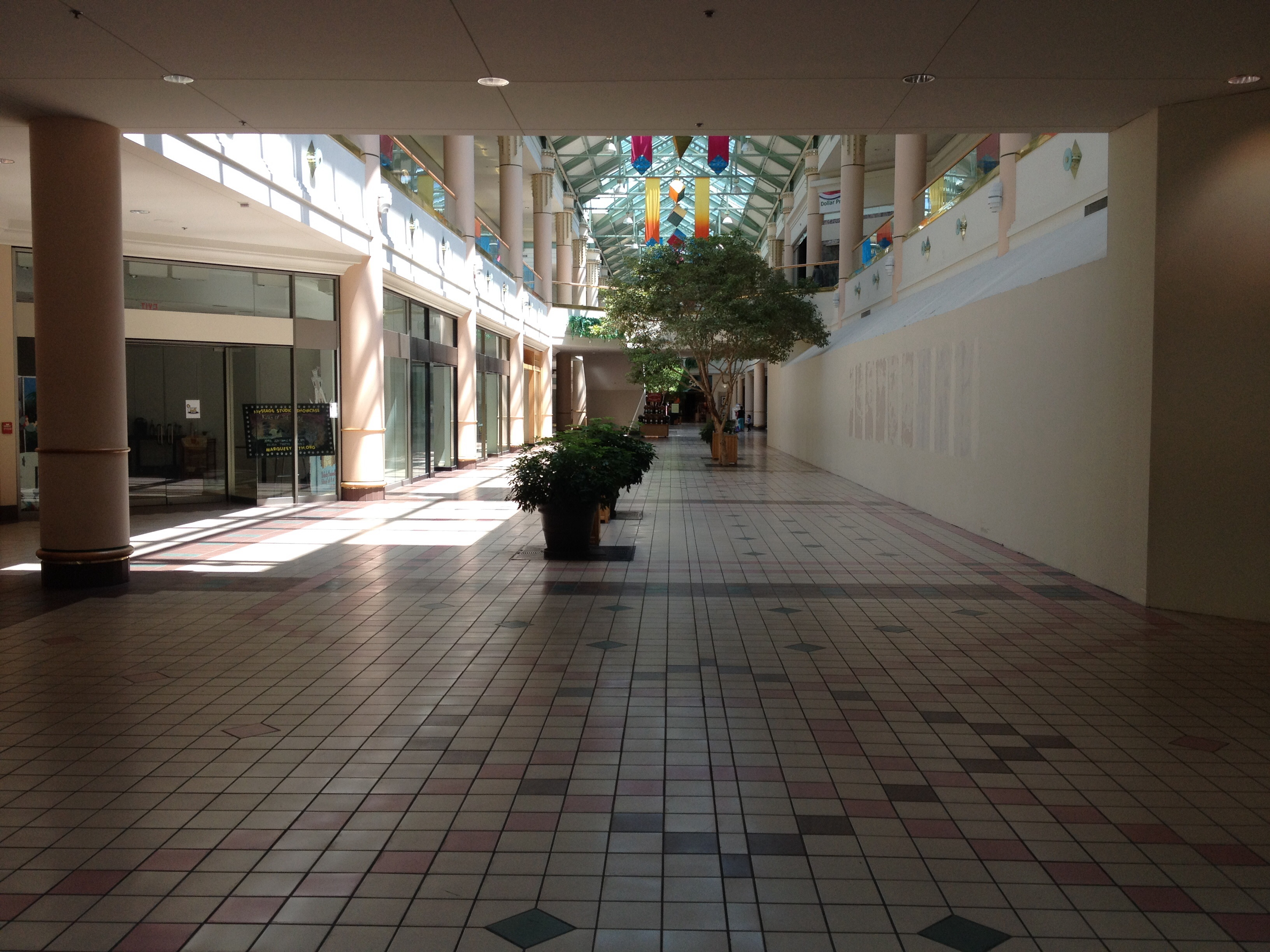
A corridor of Charlestowne Mall in 2014.

No further change was made on the mall property under McKinley's ownership, thus creating a further decline in tenancy. By June 2010, the Kane County Chronicle reported that the mall had "slightly more than two dozen" stores. That same month, a California-based investment group operating under the name Charlestowne Investments LLC acquired the mall with plans to revitalize it. After over a year, there had been no indications of communication between mall ownership and the city in terms of beginning construction for these projects, On January 4, 2011, Sears announced that their Charlestowne location would close before April 3, 2011 after negotiations between the new mall management company and Sears officials broke down. The store closed on March 20. On September 16 2011, The Toys "R" Us/Kids "R" us closed after having its moving sale and relocating to South Elgin on Randall Rd. Opening as a side-by-side Toys "R" Us and Babies "R" Us store.

After two years of no contact with the mall's ownership, city officials stated a plan in 2012 to spend $35,000 on a study to determine the best options for the mall site. No results came from the study. In mid-August the mall was put under contract to be sold by Mark Goodman & Associates. They hoped to close on the property as soon as mid-September, according to the Daily Herald.

=== 2013–present: Closure and abandonment ===
On November 14, 2013, The Krausz Companies acquired the mall property and planned to rename it as The Quad St. Charles. The new owners planned to demolish the Sears wing of the mall and completely remodel the interior and exterior. Construction was expected to start in April 2014 and completed by late 2015. However, no demolition work began. The mall's carousel was also put up for sale due to there being no room for it in the mall's new floor plan. The carousel is now relocated to the Chapultepec Park in Mexico City. The Kohl's store at Charlestowne Mall was one of eighteen closed that year by the chain due to unprofitability.

In mid-2017, the east wing of the mall, spanning the center court to Carson's, was closed; its mall entrances permanently locked, and a large wall was constructed on both floors near the center court. The rest of the mall interior, originally announced to close on October 31, 2017, finally closed December 1. with the exception of Carson's, Von Maur, and Classic Cinemas. On April 18, 2018, Carson's parent company The Bon-Ton filed for bankruptcy and announced the closure of all chains under its ownership, including Carson's. Although redevelopment was to begin in 2019 or 2020, plans were stalled by the COVID-19 pandemic.

In 2021, the partnership of Lormax Stern and S. R. Jacobson bought the mall from Krausz and announced further plans for redevelopment. These called for the demolition of most of the property except for Von Maur and the movie theater, with construction to include townhouses and a hotel. At the time of this announcement, local developers expressed concerns that too much housing was being built in the area. In 2022, Toyota filmed a commercial inside and outside the abandoned mall promoting the new 2022 Toyota GR86 Sports Car showing off its capabilities. The city of St. Charles rejected Lormax Stern and S. R. Jacobson's redevelopment plans in mid-2022 due to concerns that the plans were not suitable for the city; specifically, some officials thought that the development should instead contain "entertainment options".

There are no plans for redevelopment as of January 2025. The Charlestowne Mall property remains secluded, yet is monitored by private mall security services.
