= Edward F. Mrkvicka Jr. =

American author and financial expert

- Born: 1944 (age 81–82); Downers Grove, U.S.
- Education: University of Illinois Institute of Aviation and University of Colorado
- Occupations: Author, banker and financial expert
- Children: 2

Edward Mrkvicka is an American author, lay minister and financial expert. He is the author of multiple books on Christianity and finance and since his retirement from banking in 1982 has been the CEO of financial consulting firm Reliance Enterprises, Inc., Marengo, IL.

== Early life and education ==
He was born (1944) and raised in Downers Grove, IL. He was on active military service in the United States Air Force from 1965 to 1969 and honorably discharged October 1971.

His education included: University of Illinois Institute of Aviation (Graduated 1964), Department of Defense Information School (Graduated 1967), School of Bank Marketing/University of Colorado (Graduated 1972), and Graduate School of Bank Marketing (Graduated 1973).

== Career ==
He started his career in banking in 1970 and by 1976 he was the youngest chairman of the board of a national bank president in America. He is a former columnist; member of the Panel of Experts for Boardroom Reports; and SEC registered investment adviser.

He has been featured or published in virtually every major United States newspaper and magazine, including USA Today, Boston Globe, Chicago Tribune, Family Circle, Cosmopolitan, and Nation’s Business, as well as appearing on over 600 syndicated talk shows.

His writing focus towards his later life was dedicated to his religious beliefs and Christian counseling efforts - specifically, the destruction of the family, adultery, divorce, and their impact on innocent children.

He was awarded a U.S. Certificate of Special Congressional Recognition “…in recognition of outstanding and invaluable service to the community.”

== Works ==
His financial books on personal finance, banking, and the stock market have been selected by multiple book clubs, as well as being required reading at colleges and universities.

His Christian books have been honored with a Best Christian Book of the Year Award, a Best Christian Study Award, named a National Book Award finalist, and a winner in The Christian Choice Book Awards.

=== Published works ===
- The Prayer Promise of Christ (2010)
- “Be Not Deceived” (2007)
- Pick Winning Stocks (2000)
- Your Bank is Ripping You Off (1997, 1999)
- The Bank Book (1989, 1991, 1994)
- The Rational Investor (1991)
- 1,037 Ways to Make or Save Up to $100,000 This Year Alone (1991)
- Moving Up (1986)
- Battle Your Bank - and Win! (1985)
