= Eric Jagielo =

American baseball player (born 1992)

- Third baseman / First baseman
- Born: May 17, 1992 (age 34); Downers Grove, Illinois, U.S.
- Bats: Left Throws: Right
- Stats at Baseball Reference

Eric Stephen Jagielo (born May 17, 1992) is an American former professional baseball third baseman. He played college baseball for the Notre Dame Fighting Irish.

== Career ==
=== Amateur ===
Jagielo attended Downers Grove North High School in Downers Grove, Illinois. The Chicago Cubs selected him in the 50th round of the 2010 Major League Baseball draft. Rather than turn professional, Jagielo enrolled at the University of Notre Dame, and played college baseball for the Notre Dame Fighting Irish from 2011 to 2013. As a junior, he was named the Big East Conference Player of the Year. During his career he hit .321/.420/.532 with 27 home runs and 124 runs batted in (RBIs). In 2012, he played collegiate summer baseball for the Harwich Mariners of the Cape Cod Baseball League, and was named a league all-star.

=== New York Yankees ===
The New York Yankees selected Jagielo in the first round of the 2013 Major League Baseball draft. He signed and made his professional debut that season for the Staten Island Yankees. In 54 games, he hit .268/.381/.458 with six home runs. He was named the Player of the Week of the New York-Penn League for the week of August 19 and was a Mid-Season All-Star. In 2014, Jagielo was ranked as the team's 5th best prospect by MLB.com. He played for the Tampa Yankees that year, and hit .259 with a .354 on-base percentage, 16 home runs, and 54 RBIs in 85 games and was a Florida State League Mid-Season All-Star. In an instructional game after the season, Jagielo was hit in the face by a pitch, breaking the zygomatic arch near his left eye, which required surgery.

In 2015, he was ranked as the 8th and 11th best prospect in the system by MLB.com and Baseball America, respectively. He spent the season with the Trenton Thunder, batting .284 with nine home runs and 35 RBIs in 58 games and was an Eastern League Mid-Season All-Star. Jagielo suffered a knee injury sliding into home on June 16 and missed the rest of the season. He underwent surgery in July and was expected to play in the Arizona Fall League that fall before the Yankees decided to against it.

=== Cincinnati Reds ===
On December 28, 2015, the Yankees traded Jagielo, Rookie Davis, Tony Renda, and Caleb Cotham to the Cincinnati Reds in exchange for Aroldis Chapman. Before the 2016 season, MLB.com ranked him as the Reds' 14th best prospect and top power hitter. Jagielo spent the season with the Pensacola Blue Wahoos, where he batted .205 with seven home runs and 26 RBIs in 111 games. In 2017, he played for both Pensacola and the Louisville Bats, posting a .204 batting average with five home runs and 25 RBIs in 103 total games.

=== Miami Marlins ===
On March 17, 2018, the Miami Marlins acquired Jagielo in exchange for cash considerations. He made 121 appearances for the Double-A Jacksonville Jumbo Shrimp, batting .198/.265/.331 with 11 home runs and 64 RBI. Jagielo was released by the Marlins organization on March 29, 2019.

== Personal life ==
As of 2023, Jagielo lives outside Denver and works in finance.
