= Geneva Commons =

Coordinates: 41°53′34.2″N 88°20′34.9″W

Geneva Commons is a lifestyle center in the Chicago suburb of Geneva, Illinois. The center is located along Randall Road in the heart of the St. Charles/Geneva/Batavia retail complex. The center includes over 80 retailers and restaurants spread over 418,000 square feet (38,800 m^{2}). The center, which was developed by Jeffrey R. Anderson, was opened on September 5, 2002. The developer also built the Algonquin Commons, located 15 miles (24 km) north along Randall Road in Algonquin, which opened in 2004.

It is managed by Mid-America Asset Management, Inc.

The opening of Geneva Commons was one of the factors in the demise of Charlestowne Mall in St. Charles, Illinois.
