= St. Charles Mall =

Demolished shopping mall in St. Charles, Illinois

- Location: St. Charles, Illinois, United States
- Coordinates: 41°54′10.4″N 88°20′09.3″W
- Address: Rt. 38 & Randall Rd
- Opened: August 14, 1980; 46 years ago
- Closed: 1995; 31 years ago
- Demolished: 2002; 24 years ago
- Developer: Schostak Corporation
- Manager: St. Charles Mall Associates, Ltd.
- Owner: St. Charles Mall Associates, Ltd.
- Num. of stores: 0 (48 stores originally)
- Num. of anchor tenants: 0 (2 anchors originally)
- Floors: 1
- Parking: Less than 100

St. Charles Mall was a shopping mall in St. Charles, Illinois. The mall opened in 1980 with over 48 stores (including 2 anchor stores). The mall closed in 1995. The anchors stores were Kmart and Joseph Spiess Company.

== History ==
The mall started construction in the late 1970s and finished construction in 1980; the mall opened the same year. The interior had foliage, seating, and colorful decor throughout the mall. The mall opened with almost 48 stores. Joseph Spiess Company was the first anchor to open before the mall opened in 1979. Kmart opened the following year. The 3-screen Essaness Theatre opened in December 1980 and would later be sold to Cineplex Odeon in 1986. The more notable stores were RadioShack, DEB, General Nutrition Center, Kinney Shoes, Camelot Music, Payless Shoe Source, and B. Dalton Booksellers.

== Decline ==
The mall continued to thrive until 1991 when Charlestowne Mall opened nearby attracting shoppers away from the St. Charles Mall. Charlestowne Mall offered something to customers that St. Charles Mall didn't have: 2 floors of shopping area and over 100 stores. On the final day of the mall staying open only 1 tenant remained and 2 anchor stores. Joseph Spiess Company closed in 1995 due to bankruptcy of the company before the mall closed. Kmart closed the same year due to an unknown reason. The St. Charles Mall closed in 1995 due to vacancy. The Cineplex Odeon theater closed alongside the mall in 1995.

== Demolition ==
In early 2002, the City of St. Charles decided to demolish all the mall buildings including some outparcels for redevelopment opportunities. The demolition took about a month and a half to complete. Jewel Osco was the only outparcel to be spared from demolition.

== Redevelopment ==
The former St. Charles Mall site had a fair share of redevelopment plans over the years. The first redevelopment plan for the St. Charles Mall was in 2002 when the City of St. Charles approved plans for an auto mall. Those plans never made it into full consideration and was later dissolved. Fast forward to 2017 when the City of St. Charles approved plans for a new residential development called "Prairie Centre." Construction started on the site in 2018. Over 8 residential buildings with 670 units were built in the span of a couple years. The site is still under development to add other buildings.
