= Tivoli Theatre (Downers Grove, Illinois) =

Coordinates: 41°47′45″N 88°00′33″W

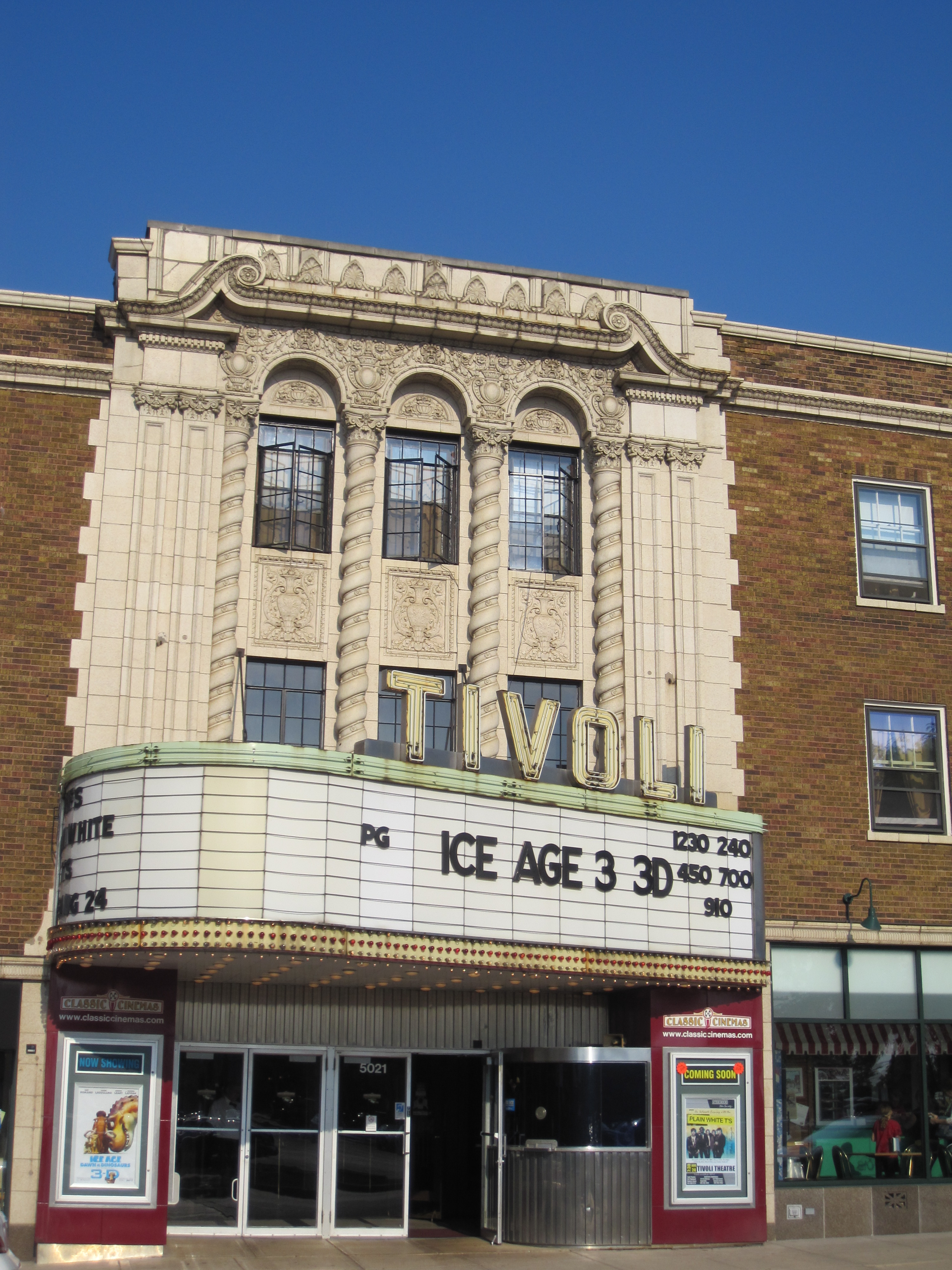
- The Tivoli Theatre, August 2009
- Interactive map of Tivoli Theatre
- Address: 5021 Highland Ave; Downers Grove, Illinois; 60515
- Owner: Classic Cinemas
- Capacity: 1,012
- Current use: Movie theater

Construction
- Opened: December 25, 1928; 97 years ago

Website
- www.classiccinemas.com/tivoli/info

The Tivoli Theatre is a movie theater built in 1928 and is located at 5021 Highland Ave, Downers Grove, Illinois. The theatre was designed by Van Gurten and Van Gurten architects, and has 1,012 seats. First opened on Christmas Day, 1928, this theatre was the second in the US to open with sound movies (the first being the Brooklyn Paramount inaugurated in November). Since its opening the theatre has been meticulously remodeled to resemble a "French Renaissance-style" theatre. The Tivoli is a rare large one-screen theatre. Most of these older theatres have been "cut up" in order to offer more screens, but the Tivoli is still intact. The building also includes a residential hotel, a bowling alley, and some other store fronts. Owned by Classic Cinemas since 1976, the theatre has an old look but new equipment.

The theatre shows both first- and second-run movies, and has live professional performances throughout the year. Bands that have performed include Blue Öyster Cult, Los Lobos, Poi Dog Pondering, Big Head Todd and the Monsters, Neko Case, and The Wallflowers.

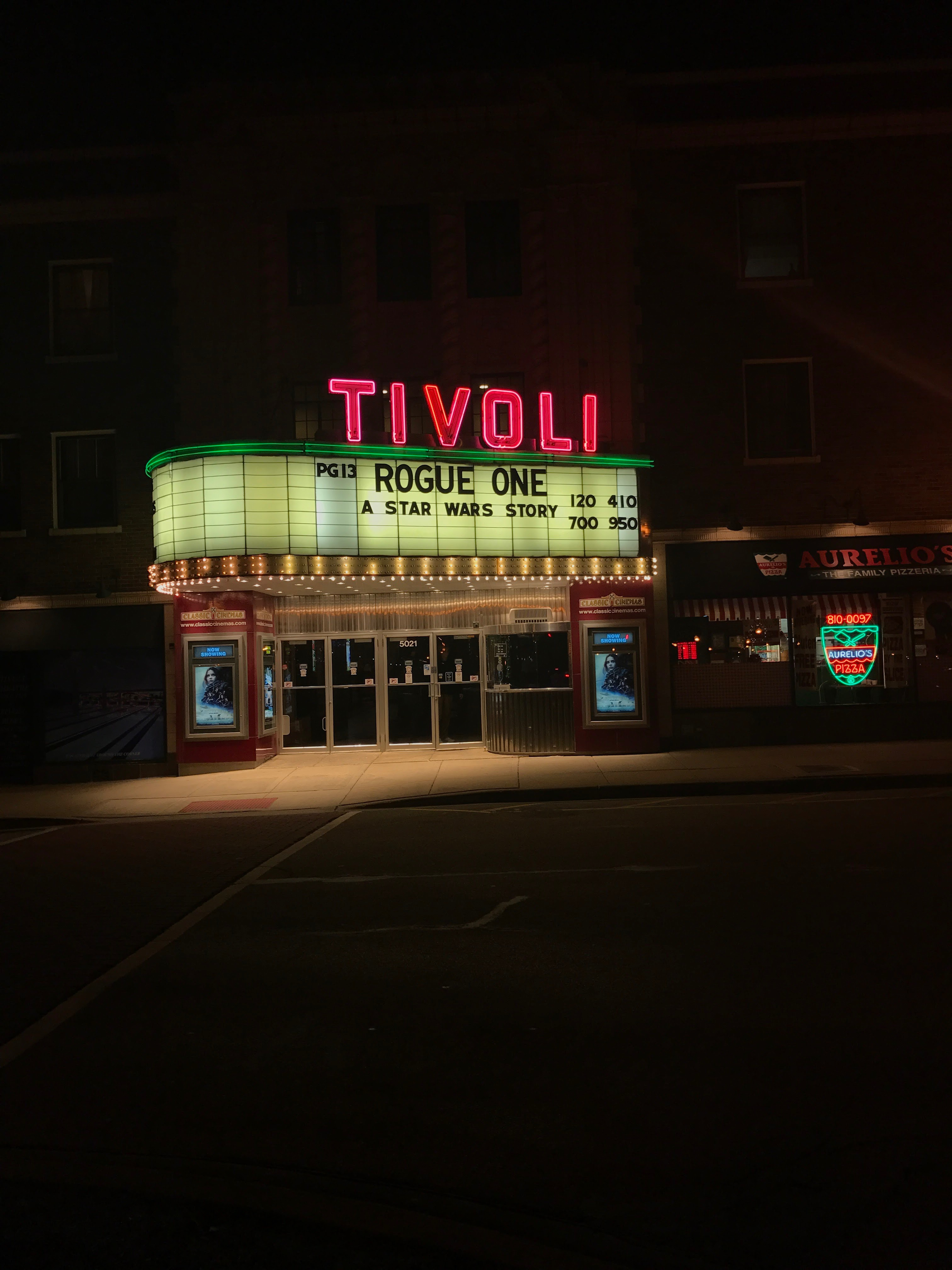
Tivoli Theatre
