= Algonquin Commons =

- Location: Algonquin, Illinois, United States
- Coordinates: 42°9′1.7″N 88°20′15.6″W
- Opened: October 7, 2004
- Developer: Jeffrey R. Anderson
- Manager: Algonquin Commons
- Owner: McKinley
- Num. of stores: 54
- Num. of anchor tenants: 10
- Floor area: 600,000 sq ft (56,000 m^{2}) (GLA)
- Floors: 1
- Parking: thousands of spaces
- Public transit: Pace
- Website: shopatalgonquincommons.com

Algonquin Commons is an outdoor shopping mall, or lifestyle center, located along Randall Road in Algonquin, Illinois, a northwest suburb of Chicago. The mall is located in Kane County, Illinois, just south of the McHenry County line. The center includes over 50 retailers and restaurants and 600,000 total square feet. The tenants in the center are varied, from discount clothiers, to specialty gift shops, to popular national fashion chains, to local independent shops, to big-box retailers and upscale restaurants. It was built in 2004.

The Algonquin Commons provides Algonquin with 1,700 jobs and over $1 million in sales tax revenue. The Algonquin Commons was built by Jeffrey R. Anderson, the same developer who built the Geneva Commons, which is located in Geneva, Illinois. In early 2013, U.S. Bank filed to foreclose on Algonquin Commons after then-owner Inland Properties ceased payments. The property is now owned by McKinley.

The Commons is also notable for its chic, upscale appearance, including outdoor lighting, lush landscaping, sidewalks and brick pavers to connect the various buildings in the center, outdoor music, individually designed storefronts, benches, and a number of special events held throughout the year, including public art displays, celebrity guest appearances, summer concerts, the Touch-a-Truck event, and horse-drawn carriage rides during the holidays.

== Randall Crossing ==
Located immediately adjacent to Algonquin Commons, but not technically part of the center is a smaller retail center called Randall Crossing. It is located at the immediate southwest corner of Randall Road and County Line Road, in front of Ulta, Discovery Clothing, and Trader Joe's.

Randall Crossing includes Eye Boutique, Lumes Pancake House, Men's Wearhouse, Menchie's Frozen Yogurt, Revital Nails & Spa, Crumbl Cookies, and Tan 9.99.
