= Doerhoefer Park =

Park in Illinois, United States

Coordinates: 41.813°N 88.016°W

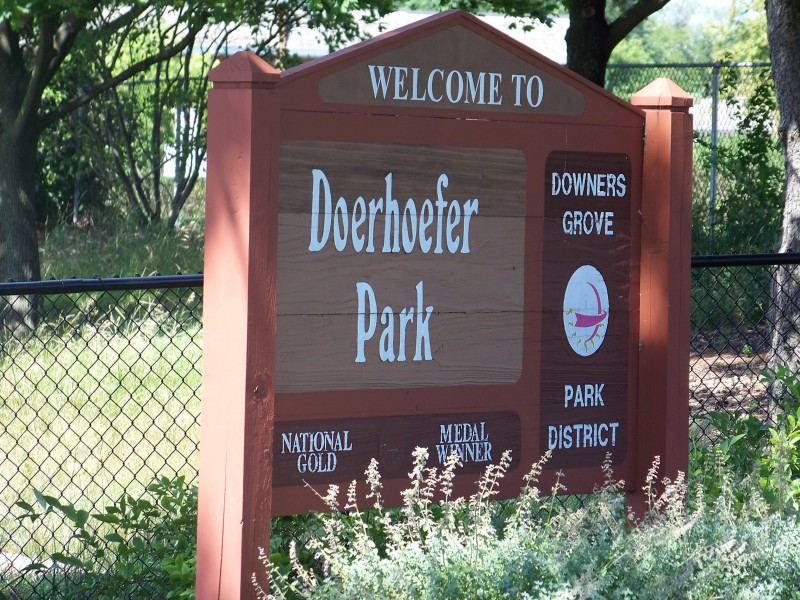
Welcome sign posted on the perimeter of the park

Doerhoefer Park is a public park located in the Orchard Brook neighborhood of Downers Grove, Illinois in the United States. The park was originally established in the 1960s, and in 1971 was named after Edward J. Doerhoefer, a former Park Commissioner and Board President. Its grounds, covering 14.02 acres, provide spaces for specific sports and activities, such as a turf field, basketball courts, tennis courts, and baseball fields. There is a football team, named Panthers. All of these areas have lighting available until 11:00 pm. Doerhoefer park also houses a playground, which is designed for children aged 5 years old through 12 years old. The playground is ADA compliant, and offers seating areas surrounding it. There are three parking lots surrounding the perimeter of the park, as well as parking along Venard Road, which is the western border of the park.

The park is just north of Ogden Avenue, which is a main thoroughfare in the town of Downers Grove. It is positioned between Venard Road to the west, and Saratoga Avenue to the east.
