= North High School (Downers Grove, Illinois) =

Public school in Illinois, United States

Downers Grove North High School
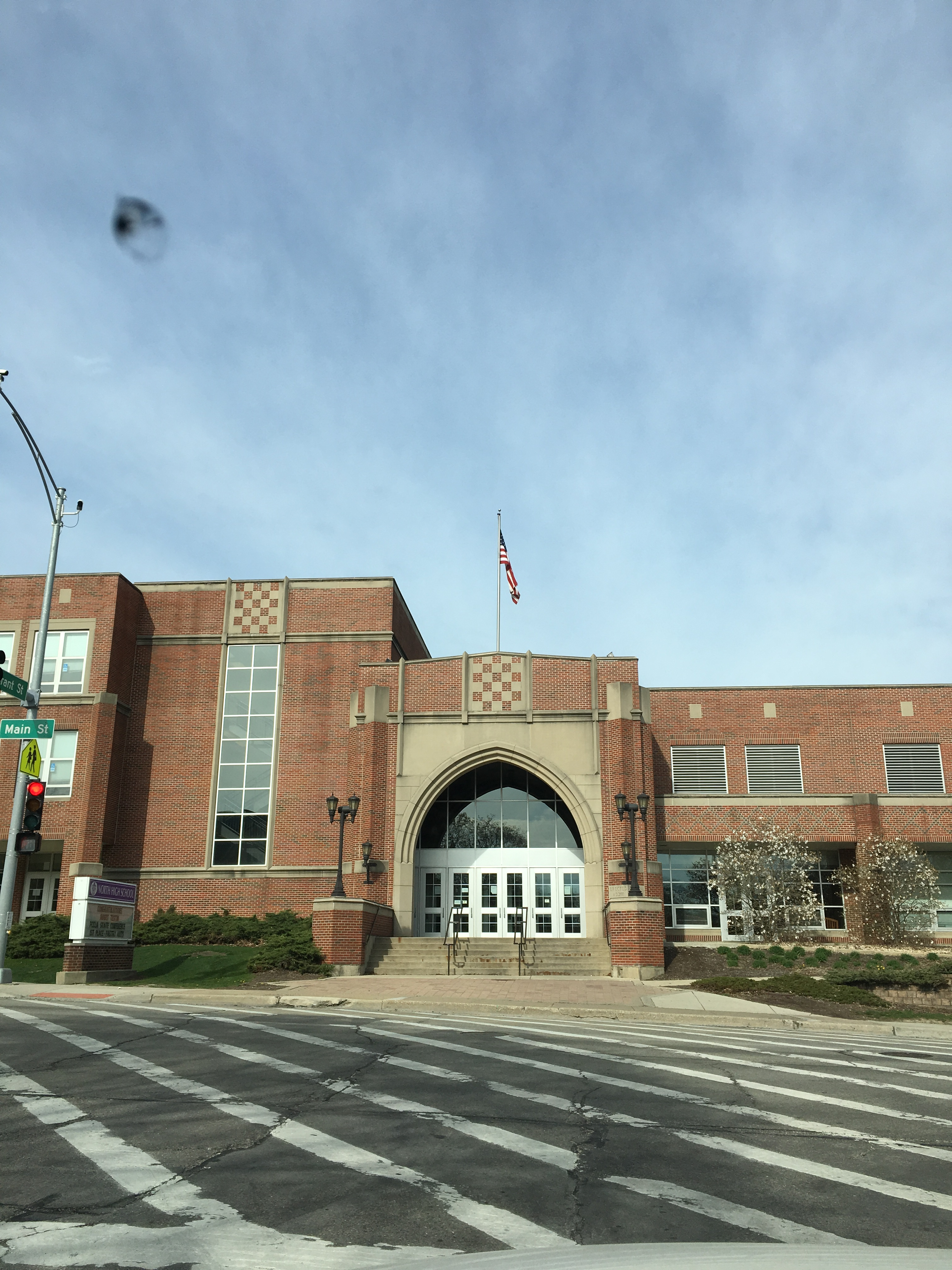

Location
- 4436 Main Street; Downers Grove, Illinois 60515; United States; 41.8055°N 88.0122°W

Information
- School type: Public
- Motto: Respectful, Responsible, and Engaged. We are DGN.
- Opened: 1928; 98 years ago
- School district: Community HS Dist. 99
- Superintendent: Hank Thiele
- Principal: Courtney DeMent
- Staff: 152.09 (on an FTE basis)
- Grades: 9–12
- Gender: co-ed
- Enrollment: 2,104 (2023-2024)
- Average class size: 21
- Student to teacher ratio: 13.83
- Campus: suburban
- Campus size: 1 building
- Colours: purple white
- Slogan: Positively North
- Song: Alma Mater
- Fight song: Alma Mater
- Athletics conference: West Suburban Conference
- Mascot: Trojan
- Nickname: Trojans
- Publication: Northwind
- Newspaper: Omega
- Yearbook: Cauldron
- radio station: WDGC
- cable TV station: channel 29
- Website: north.csd99.org

Downers Grove North High School (DGN; sometimes Downers North or North; formerly Downers Grove High School) is public high school situated in the city of Downers Grove in the Illinois state of the United States. The school was established in 1928.

== About ==
DGN is a public four-year high school located near the corner of Main Street and Ogden Avenue and located at the intersection of Main Street and Grant Street in Downers Grove, Illinois, a wealthy, western suburb of Chicago, in the United States. The original entrance is on Forest Street and the Athletic Entrance is located off Prince Street. It is part of Community High School District 99, which also includes Downers Grove South High School. The North campus draws students from Downers Grove (north of 55th St.), and small sections of Woodridge, Oak Brook, Lisle and Westmont.

== History ==
The original building (then called Downers Grove High School) was finished in 1928, with additions made in 1935, 1952, 1976, 1999–2000, 2011-2013, and 2019-2021. In 1964, the school's student body was split in half, one portion attending North, the other attending the newly built Downers Grove South.

The auditorium is named after Clarence Johnson, who served as principal of the school for 35 years from 1932 to 1967, and DGN's outdoor stadium is named after Dick Carstens, who coached football from 1955 to 1985.

The Green Room of the theatre is named after George B. Pappas, former English teacher, department head, and pep rally leader known for his positive spirit. Pappas died May 4, 1999.

== Academics ==
Downers Grove North's class of 2015 had an average composite ACT score of 24.0, 3 points above the state average. 94% of the senior class graduated. Downers Grove North made Adequate Yearly Progress on the Prairie State Achievement Examination, which with the ACT comprises the state assessments used to fulfill the federal No Child Left Behind Act. Because the school had previously not made AYP, the school is still on academic watch. 45% of students are enrolled in honors or at least one AP course.

For years 2008, 2009, and 2010, North High was named among the top 6% of high schools in the nation, according to Newsweek magazine’s annual ranking of high schools.

== Athletics ==
Downers Grove North competes in the West Suburban Conference. The school is a full member of the Illinois High School Association (IHSA), which governs most interscholastic sports and competitive activities in Illinois. The schools teams are stylized as the Trojans.

The school sponsors interscholastic teams for young men and women in: basketball, cross country, golf, gymnastics, soccer, swimming & diving, tennis, track & field, volleyball. Young men may compete in baseball, football, and wrestling, while young women may compete in badminton, bowling, cheerleading, and softball. The following teams have finished in the top four of their respective IHSA sponsored state championships tournament or meet.

- Badminton: 4th place (1996–97); 3rd place (1999–2000, 2004–05, 2006–2007, 2009–10); 2nd place (2000–01, 2001–02); State Champions (2002–03, 2003–04, 2005–06)
- Basketball (boys): 4th place (2022–23)
- Cross country (boys): 4th place (1986–87); 3rd place (1949–50, 2000–01, 2021–22); 2nd place (2013–14, 2016–17); State Champions (2017–18, 2023–24)
- Cross country (girls): 4th place (1979–80, 1987–88); 3rd place (1982–83); 2nd place (1983–84, 1984–85, 1988–89, 2023–24); State Champions (1980–81)
- Football: Quarterfinals (1999-2000, 2012-2013, 2013–2014) semifinals (1991–92, 1998–99, 2003–04); 2nd place (1990–91, 2023–24); State Champions (2004–05)
- Golf (boys): 4th place (1951–52, 1959–60)
- Gymnastics (boys): 4th place (1995–96)
- Swimming & Diving (girls): 4th place (2010–11); 2nd place (2013–14, 2014–15)
- Volleyball (boys): 2nd place (1993–94)
- Volleyball (girls): 4th place (1984–85, 1988–89) 2nd place (2018–19)
- Athenas (girls dance team): 1st place (2009–2010)

== Activities ==
The student newspaper, The Omega, which is published monthly, has been ranked in the top ten in the 9- to 12-page broadsheet category by the NSPA. The school literary magazine, the Northwind, is published annually. In 2012, its Speech Team placed second at the IHSA state competition.

== Demographics ==
In the 2022-2023 school year, there were 2,138 students enrolled at the school. In the same year, 71% of students identified as non-Hispanic white, 14% were Hispanic, 6% were Asian, 5% were black or African-American, and 4% were multiracial. The school has a student to teacher ratio of 13.9, and 9% of students are eligible for free or reduced price lunches.

== Notable alumni ==
- Muriel Anderson (1978) is a songwriter and guitarist
- David Edwards (2015) is a professional football player for the Buffalo Bills
- Andrea Evans (1974) was a television actress (Tina Lord on One Life to Live and Passions)
- Cammi Granato (1989) is a former Olympic hockey player, who captained the U.S. national team to the gold medal at the 1998 Winter Olympics. In 2008, she was inducted into the International Hockey Hall of Fame, and became the first woman inducted into the United States Hockey Hall of Fame
- Don Granato (1985) is a former professional hockey player and, from 2008 to 2009, head coach of the Chicago Wolves
- Tony Granato (1982) is a former NHL left wing (1988–2001). Former head coach of the NHL Colorado Avalanche. and current men's head coach for the University of Wisconsin
- Tomlinson Holman (1964) was the creator of the Tomlinson Holman Experimental Sound System (THX Sound System) and its companions the Theater Alignment Program, Home THX, the THX Digital Mastering program
- Erica Hubbard (1997) is an actress predominantly known for her work on television (Lincoln Heights, The Replacements)
- Eric Jagielo (2010) is a professional baseball player
- Bruce Lindahl (1971) was a serial killer and rapist
- Jim McDermott (1954) represented Washington's 7th congressional district in the US Congress from 1989 to 2017)
- Sherrill Milnes (1952) is a professional baritone opera singer, who had a long association with the Metropolitan Opera in New York. He performed on three Grammy Award winning albums
- Lanny Poffo (1973) was a professional wrestler, known under the stage name "The Genius" in the World Wrestling Entertainment (WWE)
- Randall Poffo (1971) was a professional wrestler, known under the stage name "Macho Man Randy Savage" in WWE, World Championship Wrestling (WCW) and Total Nonstop Action Wrestling (TNA)
- John A. "Shorty" Powers (1941) was a public relations officer with the United States Air Force, and later with NASA during Project Mercury
- Jim Reninger (1933) is a former MLB player (Philadelphia Athletics), and the first DGN alum to play Major League Baseball
- Denise Richards (transferred) is an actress (Starship Troopers, The World Is Not Enough)
- Barbara Stock (1974) is an actress best known for her work on television (Spenser: For Hire and Dallas)
- Matthew West (1995) is a guitarist and songwriter of Contemporary Christian music (More, You Are Everything)
- Crystal Yi (2011) is an American singer of Korean descent who was the winner of SBS's K-pop Star 5 in 2016
- Ellie Banke (2019) is a singer-songwriter known for collaborating with Ed Sheeran and opening for his 2026 Loop Tour.
- Chirinjeev Kathuria (2004) is an Indian-American businessman.
- Zito Perez (2010) Producer for The Pat McAfee Show
