= Community High School District 99 =

School district in Illinois, United States

Address
- 6301 Springside Avenue Downers Grove, Illinois, 60516; United States

District information
- Grades: 9–12
- Established: 1923
- Superintendent: Henry Thiele
- Schools: 2
- Budget: US$90 million
- NCES District ID: 1712570

Students and staff
- Students: 5,055
- Teachers: 324
- Student–teacher ratio: 15.60

Other information
- Website: www.csd99.org

Community High School District 99 is a local school district serving Downers Grove, Woodridge, Westmont, Darien, Lisle, Bolingbrook, and Oak Brook in the state of Illinois. A non-residential portion of Lombard also is zoned to this district. It consists of two high schools, North High School and South High School, both located in Downers Grove. The current Superintendent of this district is Henry Thiele, a position formerly held by Dr. Mark McDonald.

== History ==
In 2015 Henry Thiele (pronounced THEE-lee) was named district superintendent, effective July 1, 2016. He previously worked for Maine Township High School District 207 as the assistant superintendent for technology and learning.

== Student demographics ==
=== Race ===
White	Black	Hispanic	Asian/ Pacific Islander	Native; American	Multi-Racial /Ethnic
66.7%	9.8%	12.4%	7.5%	.2%	3.5%

=== Other ===
Definitions can be found on the District Report Card.

Low-Income	Limited English; Proficiency	Mobility Rate
26.5%	2%	3%

== Staff ==
The teaching staff is 324 teachers, who have taught for an average of 13.5 years. Over 83.2% of teachers hold a master's degree or higher. The average salary for the equivalent of a full-time teacher is $89,652, over $25,000 above than the state average, and $118,419 for an administrator, over $18,000 above the state average. The Student-to-teacher ratio is 19 to 1, and the student to administrator ratio is 108 to 1.

== Finances ==
For 2015, Fiscal Year 2013–2014

=== Sources ===
Local	State	Federal	Total
$82,073,202	$5,957,110	$2,206,913	$88,030,312
93.23%	6.77%	2.51%	100%

=== Expenses ===
Education	Operation and Maintenance	Bond and Interest	Transportation	Municipal Retirement/ Social Security	Construction and remodeling	Total
$64,959,851	$8,428,618	$10,010,290	$3,213,076	$2,872,950	$1,837,396	$91,322,181
71.13%	9.23%	10.96%	3.52%	3.15%	2.01%	100%

== School Board ==
The Board of education for District 99 consists of 7 members. Each member serves for four years, and every other year (during even-numbered years) an election is held. Elections of board members are scheduled such that four positions come up for election on years divisible by four, and three members come up for election on even numbered years not divisible by four.

=== Current School Board ===
- Don Renner (President)
  - Next election for position: 2027
- Kara Casten (Vice President)
  - Next election for position: 2027
- Christopher Espinoza
  - Next election for position: 2029
- Katie Courtney
  - Next election for position: 2029
- April Finan
  - Next election for position: 2029
- Mike Riske
  - Next election for position: 2029
- Ken Dawson
  - Next election for position: 2027
