= Downers Grove South High School =

Location
- 1436 Norfolk Street; Downers Grove, Illinois 60516; United States; 41.7708°N 88.0207°W

Information
- School type: Public
- Motto: Mustang Way
- Opened: 1964
- School district: Community HS Dist. 99
- Superintendent: Henry Thiele
- Principal: Arwen Lyp
- Staff: 179.41 (FTE)
- Grades: 9–12
- Gender: Co-Ed
- Enrollment: 2,604 (2023-2024)
- Average class size: 21.0
- Student to teacher ratio: 14.51
- Campus: Suburban
- Colours: Navy; Columbia blue
- Athletics conference: West Suburban Conference
- Mascot: Marty the Mustang
- Nickname: Mustangs
- Publication: Calliope
- Newspaper: The Blueprint
- Yearbook: Caracole
- Radio station: WDGC (88.3 FM)
- Cable TV station: Channel 29
- Website: south.csd99.org

Downers Grove South High School (locally referred to as "DGS") is a public four-year high school in Downers Grove, Illinois, a western suburb of Chicago, Illinois, United States. Its principal is Arwen Lyp. It is part of Community High School District 99, which also includes Downers Grove North High School. The South campus draws students from Downers Grove (south of 55th St.), the majority of Woodridge, half of Darien (west of Cass Ave.), and small sections of Bolingbrook and Westmont.

== History ==
The school opened its doors in 1964. The student population at Downers Grove High School was split in two, half going to the original structure now named Downers Grove North, and half going to the new building.

It has since undergone significant renovations to bring it up to date, including a $49.5 million voter referendum for the district in 2001. In the summer of 2008, the school embarked on a parking space expansion, which had been plagued by delays. Despite several postponements, parking lot adjustments were prepared in time to effectively start the 2008–09 school year.

On June 22, 2011, at around 8:30 pm, the school's outdoor sports areas were extensively damaged during a two-minute EF1 tornado. Fences around the tennis courts were flattened, portable toilets and rows of bleachers were flipped upside down, and branches fell across the football/soccer field.

In March 2018, the community surrounding the school voted to approve the Master Facility Plan, which laid out plans to completely overhaul both South and neighboring North high school into modern learning facilities. Construction started at the end of the 2018–2019 school year, and was completed at the start of the 2021–2022 school year.

The 2022–2023 school year saw the introduction of a new block schedule. While far from the first implementation of this style, due to concerns from staff, students, and parents, the school board decided on a roughly half-and-half approach to its implementation. This was designed as both a trial run of this schedule type, and as a use for the various common spaces located around the school that were built during the MFP.

== Academics ==
In 2008, Downers Grove South had an average composite ACT score of 22.0, 0.5 points above the state average.

DGS graduated 96.7% of its senior class.

The school has not made Adequate Yearly Progress (AYP) on the Prairie State Achievement Examination, which with the ACT, are the assessment tools used to fulfill mandates of the federal No Child Left Behind Act. While the school as a whole did make AYP, two of the six student subgroups failed to meet expectations in reading.

== Demographics ==
In the 2022–2023 school year, there were 2,637 students enrolled at the school. In the same year, 56% of students were non-Hispanic white, 22% were Hispanic or Latino, 11% were black or African-American, 7% were Asian, and 3% were multiracial. The school has a student to teacher ratio of 14.6, and 17% of students are eligible for free or reduced price lunches.

== Athletics ==
South competes in the West Suburban Conference. It is also a member of the Illinois High School Association (IHSA), which governs most sports and competitive activities in the state of Illinois. The school teams are stylized as the Mustangs.

The school sponsors interscholastic teams for young men and women in basketball, cross country, golf, gymnastics, soccer, swimming & diving, tennis, fishing, track & field, Ultimate frisbee, and volleyball. Young men may compete in baseball, football, co-ed varsity cheerleading, and wrestling, while young women may also compete in badminton, bowling, cheerleading, and softball. The DGS Fillies (varsity) and Pintos (JV) dance and pom teams perform at halftime at men's home football and basketball games, and compete at the Team Dance Illinois State Competition every year.

The following teams have won in their respective IHSA sponsored state tournament or meet:

- Dance team: State Champions (2005, 2006, 2007, 2008)
- Co-ed cheerleading: State Champions (2003–04), National Champions (2004–05)
- Football: 8A State Champions (2001–02)
- Soccer (boys): State Champions (2004–05)
- Softball: State Champions (1992–93)
- Volleyball (girls): State Champions (1996–97, 1999–2000, 2002–03)
- Volleyball (boys): State Champions (2012–13)

== Activities ==
Downers Grove South has won several state championship for its extracurricular activities, including (as of 2008) three in performance in the round, two in chess, and three from the Fillies Pom and Dance Team.

The speech team has won 18 IHSA state championships, more than any other school. In 1997, it became the only team to win the speech state championship four years in a row, and in 2009 became the only school to win that title six years in a row.

The radio station, WDGC – 88.3FM, is run by students during school hours, usually chosen as an elective. Their Marching Band won the 2019 University of Illinois Marching Band Championship.

== Notable alumni ==
- Bob Bryar, drummer for the rock band My Chemical Romance
- Nick Burdi, professional baseball player
- Zack Burdi, professional baseball player for the Chicago White Sox
- Greg Corner, bass guitarist for Kill Hannah; co-host and musical director of JBTV
- Scott Daly, NFL player
- Tori Franklin, Olympic triple jumper
- Lauren Frost, actress best known as Ruby Mendel in the Disney Channel Original Series Even Stevens and Disney Channel Original Movie The Even Stevens Movie
- Sonny Mallhi, actor
- Mary T. McDowell, CEO, Mitel; former CEO, Polycom
- Bryan Mullins, basketball coach for the Southern Illinois Salukis
- Emo Philips, comedian
- Chandler Whitmer, college football player and coach
