= Downers Grove, Illinois =

- Village
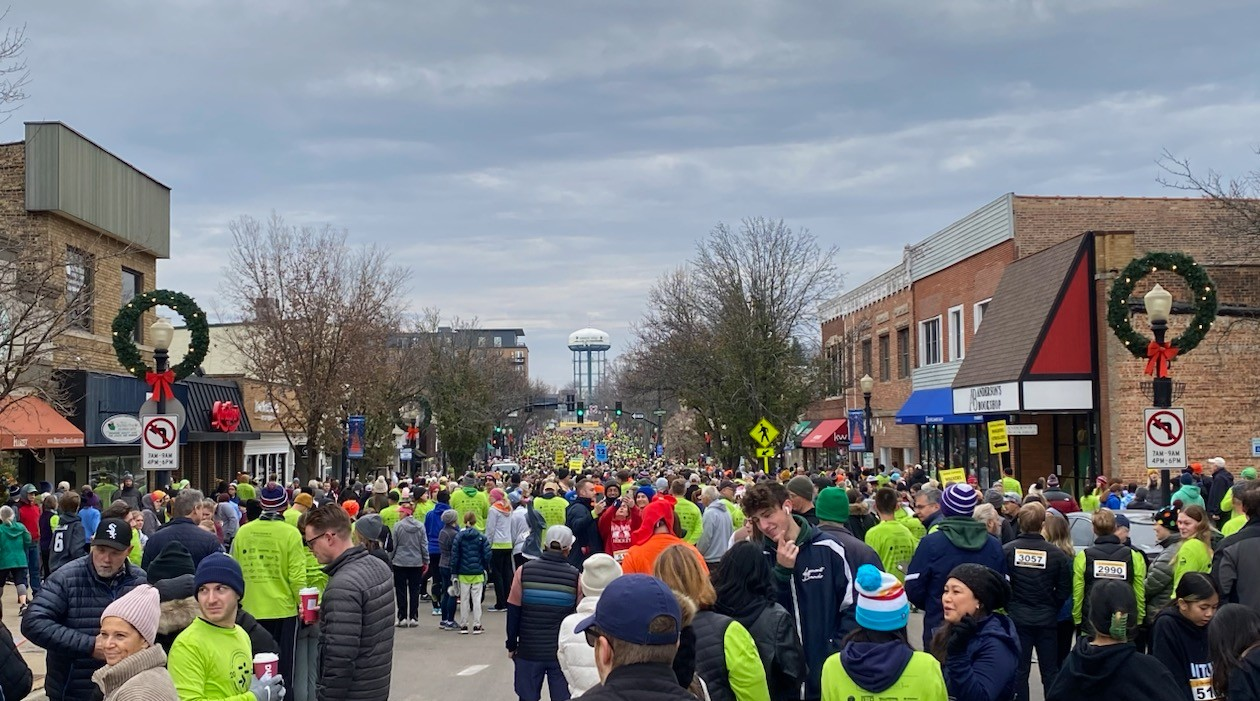
- Main Street

- Seal Logo
- Interactive map of Downers Grove, Illinois
- Location within Greater Chicago Location within Illinois Location within the United States
- Coordinates: 41°47′21″N 87°59′40″W
- Country: United States
- State: Illinois
- County: DuPage
- Townships: Downers Grove, Lisle, York, Milton
- Founded: 1832
- Incorporated: 1873

Government
  - Type: Council–manager
  - Mayor: Robert T. Barnett

Area
  - Total: 14.80 sq mi (38.32 km^{2})
  - Land: 14.65 sq mi (37.94 km^{2})
  - Water: 0.15 sq mi (0.39 km^{2})
- Elevation: 709 ft (216 m)

Population (2020)
  - Total: 50,247
  - Density: 3,430.5/sq mi (1,324.51/km^{2})
- Time zone: UTC−6 (CST)
  - Summer (DST): UTC−5 (CDT)
- ZIP Codes: 60515–60517
- Area codes: 630 and 331
- FIPS code: 17-20591
- GNIS ID: 2398745
- Website: www.downers.us

Downers Grove is a village in DuPage County, Illinois, United States. It was founded in 1832 by Pierce Downer, whose surname serves as the eponym for the village. Per the 2020 census, the population of the village was 50,248. It is a southwestern suburb of Chicago located between I-88 and I-55.

== History ==
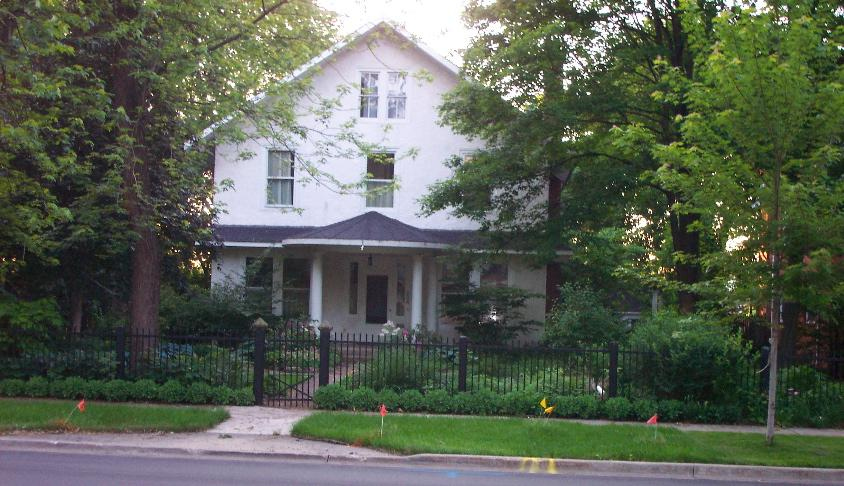
The Lyman Home (1839) in Downers Grove was a former stop on the Underground Railroad.

Downers Grove was founded in 1832 by Pierce Downer, a farmer who traveled to Illinois from Rutland, New York, but was originally from Vermont. Downers Grove was named for a lush grove of old-growth bur oak trees surrounding the village, which stood out from the local savanna landscape. Its other early settlers included the Blodgett, Curtiss, Blanchard, Stanley, Lyman, and Carpenter families. The original settlers were mostly migrants from the Northeastern United States and Northern Europe. In 1839, Reverend Orange Lyman, a presbyterian minister, and his wife Maria Dewey Lyman arrived, and built what is believed to be the first home in Downers Grove. The first schoolhouse was built in 1844. In 1846, the Blodgett house was built by Israel and Avis Blodgett. It was the second (or third) home built in Downers Grove. Both the Lyman and Blodgett homes are of cultural significance, as they were both built by abolitionist families and served as former stops on the Underground Railroad.

The Chicago, Burlington and Quincy Railroad was extended from Aurora to Chicago through Downers Grove in 1864, boosting its population. The town was incorporated in March 1873. Its somewhat unusual spelling ("Apostrophe-free since 1873") remains a minor historical mystery.

In April 1947, the wreck of a Burlington Railroad Twin Cities Zephyr passenger train killed three people, including the engineer. The streamliner struck a large tractor which had fallen from a freight train and two passenger cars crashed through a wall of the Main Street Station.

The construction of two major toll roads along the village's northern and western boundaries, I-355 in 1989, and what is now referred to as I-88 in 1958, facilitated the village's access to the rest of Chicago metropolitan area. I-55 is not far from the south edge of the village. Downers Grove has developed into a bustling Chicago suburb with many diverse businesses, including the headquarters for FTD, Ambitech Engineering Corp, Dover, Heartland Food Corporation, and HAVI Global Solutions.

=== Housing ===
The housing stock in Downers Grove comprises a mixture; some, generally near the center of town, date from the middle of the 19th century, but housing styles of each succeeding generation are represented. Downers Grove has witnessed one of the highest teardown rates in the Chicago area; small older residences are being demolished and replaced with much larger new houses. Teardowns have been the source of much controversy within the village. Since they occupy much more land than the original houses, rainwater that was originally absorbed by their yards is directed into neighboring yards and streets, resulting in flooding. Concerns have been raised that teardowns reduce affordable housing in the town and promote gentrification.

== Geography ==
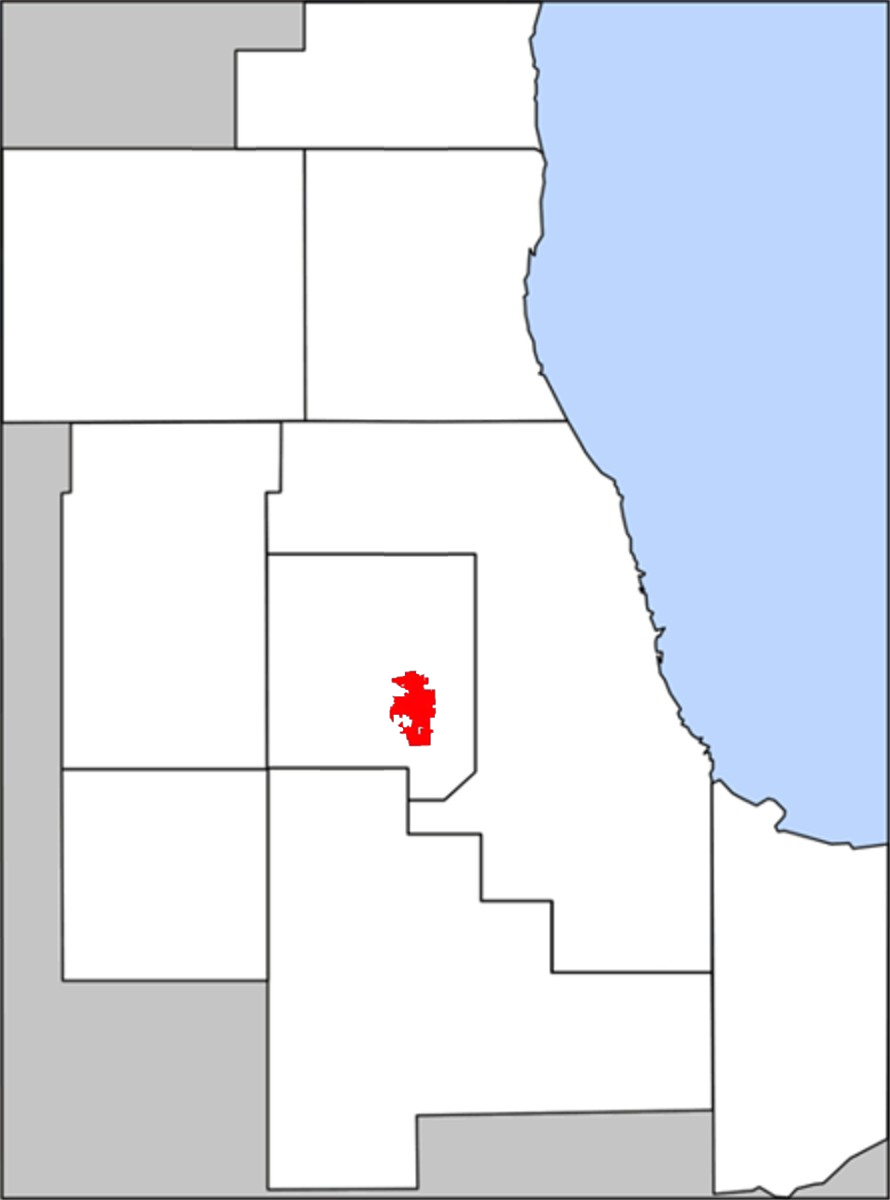
Map of the village's boundaries within DuPage County

According to the 2010 census, Downers Grove has a total area of 14.457 square miles (37.44 km^{2}), of which 14.31 square miles (37.06 km^{2}) (or 98.98%) is land and 0.147 square miles (0.38 km^{2}) (or 1.02%) is water. Only the DuPage County communities of Bartlett, Aurora, Naperville and Bolingbrook have larger land areas. Within the town are two forest preserves: Lyman Woods and Maple Grove Forest Preserve. A small creek runs through Maple Grove forest preserve. Downers Grove has been designated a Tree City USA 28 times by the National Arbor Day Foundation.

=== Climate ===
Downers Grove is in a humid continental climate zone. On average, January is the coldest month, while July is the warmest month. August typically has the most precipitation, and February the least. The record high for Downers Grove was 105 °F (41 °C) in July 2005, and the record low of −26 °F (−32 °C) was set in January 1985.

Climate data for Downers Grove, Illinois
Month	Jan	Feb	Mar	Apr	May	Jun	Jul	Aug	Sep	Oct	Nov	Dec	Year
Record high °F (°C)	65 (18)	70 (21)	85 (29)	90 (32)	95 (35)	103 (39)	105 (41)	100 (38)	100 (38)	90 (32)	78 (26)	70 (21)	105 (41)
Mean daily maximum °F (°C)	32 (0)	38 (3)	50 (10)	63 (17)	75 (24)	84 (29)	87 (31)	85 (29)	78 (26)	67 (19)	50 (10)	37 (3)	62 (17)
Mean daily minimum °F (°C)	14 (−10)	19 (−7)	28 (−2)	38 (3)	48 (9)	57 (14)	63 (17)	61 (16)	53 (12)	42 (6)	32 (0)	20 (−7)	40 (4)
Record low °F (°C)	−26 (−32)	−21 (−29)	−10 (−23)	4 (−16)	25 (−4)	32 (0)	41 (5)	38 (3)	27 (−3)	14 (−10)	−4 (−20)	−21 (−29)	−26 (−32)
Average precipitation inches (mm)	1.85 (47)	1.56 (40)	2.62 (67)	3.80 (97)	3.94 (100)	3.91 (99)	3.97 (101)	4.60 (117)	3.38 (86)	2.66 (68)	3.20 (81)	2.45 (62)	37.94 (965)

== Demographics ==
Historical population
Census	Pop.	Note	%±
1880	586		—
1890	960		63.8%
1900	2,103		119.1%
1910	2,601		23.7%
1920	3,543		36.2%
1930	8,977		153.4%
1940	9,526		6.1%
1950	11,886		24.8%
1960	21,154		78.0%
1970	32,544		53.8%
1980	42,259		29.9%
1990	46,845		10.9%
2000	48,724		4.0%
2010	47,833		−1.8%
2020	50,247		5.0%
U.S. Decennial Census; 2018 Estimate

=== Racial and ethnic composition ===
Downers Grove village, Illinois – Racial and ethnic composition Note: the US Census treats Hispanic/Latino as an ethnic category. This table excludes Latinos from the racial categories and assigns them to a separate category. Hispanics/Latinos may be of any race.
Race / Ethnicity (NH = Non-Hispanic)	Pop 2000	Pop 2010	Pop 2020	% 2000	% 2010	% 2020
White alone (NH)	42,777	40,631	40,289	87.79%	84.94%	80.18%
Black or African American alone (NH)	911	1,388	1,801	1.87%	2.90%	3.58%
Native American or Alaska Native alone (NH)	43	37	34	0.09%	0.08%	0.07%
Asian alone (NH)	2,773	2,623	2,919	5.69%	5.48%	5.81%
Pacific Islander alone (NH)	5	4	13	0.01%	0.01%	0.03%
Other race alone (NH)	48	55	118	0.10%	0.11%	0.23%
Mixed race or Multiracial (NH)	420	627	1,664	0.86%	1.31%	3.31%
Hispanic or Latino (any race)	1,747	2,468	3,409	3.59%	5.16%	6.78%
Total	48,724	47,833	50,247	100.00%	100.00%	100.00%

=== 2020 census ===
As of the 2020 census, Downers Grove had a population of 50,247. The population density was 3,475.6 inhabitants per square mile (1,341.9/km^{2}). The median age was 43.3 years.

21.5% of residents were under the age of 18 and 20.4% of residents were 65 years of age or older. 5.9% of the population was under the age of 5. For every 100 females there were 94.9 males, and for every 100 females age 18 and over there were 92.2 males age 18 and over. 100.0% of residents lived in urban areas, while 0.0% lived in rural areas.

There were 20,368 households in Downers Grove, of which 28.3% had children under the age of 18 living in them. Of all households, 54.7% were married-couple households, 15.3% were households with a male householder and no spouse or partner present, and 25.8% were households with a female householder and no spouse or partner present. About 29.4% of all households were made up of individuals and 14.4% had someone living alone who was 65 years of age or older. The average household size was 2.42 and the average family size was 3.09.

There were 21,355 housing units, of which 4.6% were vacant. The homeowner vacancy rate was 1.5% and the rental vacancy rate was 6.0%.

=== Income and poverty ===
According to the 2020 American Community Survey, the Median Household Income in the village was $97,197 (~$115,736 in 2024). The median income for a family was $131,733, while the median income for a non-family household was $45,193. About 5.0% of the population were below the poverty line, including 2.6% of minors under age 18, 5.5% of adults aged 18–64, and 6.0% of seniors age 65 or over. The state of Illinois as a whole, has a $68,428 Median Household Income and a 12.0% poverty rate

== Economy ==
Located 20 miles west of the Chicago Loop, Downers Grove residents commonly commute via the village's three Metra BNSF line stations or highway connections. The village itself also serves as headquarters for multiple businesses, including Advocate Aurora Health and Fortune 500 members Dover Corporation and Univar Solutions. The village is also home to regional satellite offices of numerous national corporations, including Microsoft, MetLife, and State Farm.

=== Top employers ===
According to the Village's 2023 Comprehensive Annual Financial Report, the top employers in the city are:

#	Employer	# of Employees
1	Duly Health and Care	4549
2	Hearthside Food Solutions LLC	3600
3	Advocate Good Samaritan Hospital	2500
4	Midwestern University	1000
5	Ambitech Engineering Corp.	700
5	Havi Global Solutions, LLC	700
5	Cooper's Hawk Winery & Restaurants	700
6	First Health Corporation/Coventry Health Care	500
6	FTD Inc	500
7	Advocate Aurora Health (formerly Advocate Health)	450
8	HMOS of Blue Cross Blue Shield of Illinois	420
9	Flavochem	400
9	Rexnord	400
10	Ensono	368

== Arts and culture ==
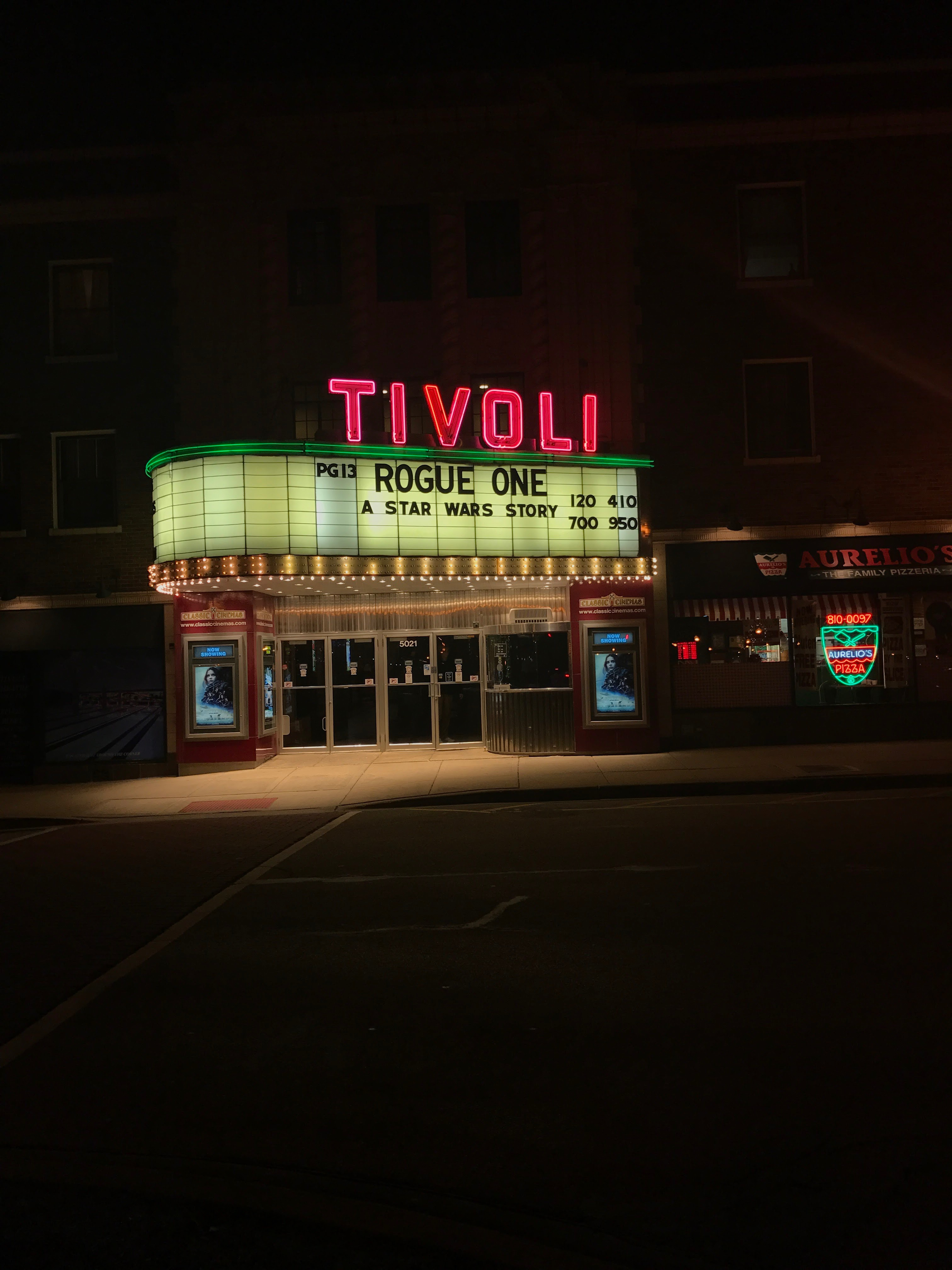
Tivoli Theatre

=== Architecture ===
Downers Grove has 68 confirmed Sears Kit Homes, 11 Harris Brothers, 9 Wardway/Gordon-Van Tine, and 1 Aladdin Kit Home. Source Downers Grove Museum. Sears and Other Kit-Home research.

=== Tivoli Theatre ===
The Tivoli Theatre is located in Downers Grove. Built in 1928, with an initial seating capacity of 1,390, The Tivoli was the first theatre in DuPage County to show "talkies". The Tivoli was equipped with an original Wurlitzer theatre organ. Replaced in 1992, the current instrument, dubbed "Opus 942", originally came from the Indian Theatre in East Chicago, Indiana. The Wurlitzer is frequently played during the opening credits of films shown on weekend evenings.

== Parks and recreation ==
Downers Grove contains many parks and forest preserves, including Doerhoefer Park. The 360 acres (150 ha) Hidden Lake Forest Preserve contains a glacier-dug pond that provides boating access to the nearby DuPage River (East Branch).

Lyman Woods, a nature preserve, was originally ranching lands. The 150 acres (61 ha) preserve consists of oak savannas, prairies, and marshes. The land was purchased by Downers Grove in 1987. The preserve contains over 300 native species of plants and animals; six of which are considered rare in northern Illinois. In 1996, residents of Downers Grove passed the referendum to protect Lyman Woods from residential and commercial development.

== Government ==
=== Local ===
The Village of Downers Grove operates under a magisterial council-manager form of government. The Village Council is the policy-making body that authorizes a professional manager to oversee the daily operations of the village. The Village Council is composed of the Mayor and six Commissioners elected at-large. In addition to the Municipal Code, which establishes many of the rules and regulations by which the Village operates, the council has also adopted separate council policies on several matters related to municipal activities.

The Mayor of Downers Grove is Robert T. Barnett. The Mayor and Commissioners are elected for four-year terms at odd-year Consolidated General Elections.

The elections for Mayor and Commissioners are non-partisan; the candidates' party affiliations do not appear on the ballot, and direct party funding is not traditionally practiced.

=== State and national ===
The majority of the Village of Downers Grove is within the 6th US Congressional District of Illinois. Downers Grove resident Sean Casten (Democrat) has represented the district since 2019. Portions of southwest Downers Grove are within 11th US Congressional District. This district is represented by Bill Foster (Democratic).

The majority of the Village of Downers Grove is within the Illinois Senate 41st Legislative District, which is represented by John Curran (Republican) as of 2023. A portion of northern Downers Grove is within the Illinois Senate 24th Legislative District, which is represented by Suzy Glowiak (Democratic) as of 2019.

The majority of the Village of Downers Grove is within the Illinois House of Representatives 81st Representative District, which was represented by Ron Sandack (Republican) as of 2015. Sandack abruptly resigned in July 2016 citing issues with social media and "ugly" politics. In August, local Republican officials chose David S. Olsen, previously the mayor pro tem of Downers Grove, as the new Representative of the 81st District. In 2018, newcomer Anne Stava-Murray overcame David S. Olsen in the election with only approximately $30,000 (~$36,801 in 2024). Portions of northern Downers Grove are within the Illinois House of Representatives 45th Representative District, which is represented by Martha Deuter (Democrat) and the Illinois House of Representatives 42nd Representative District, which is represented by Margaret DeLaRosa (Democratic).

In 2006, the July 4 parade in Downers Grove featured both of the major Illinois gubernatorial candidates at the time, Judy Baar Topinka (R) and Rod Blagojevich (D).

== Education ==
Downers Grove is home to twelve public elementary schools, two public middle schools and two public high schools, Downers Grove North High School and Downers Grove South High School. Eleven of the elementary schools, including Hillcrest, Belle Aire, El Sierra, Kingsley, Fairmount, Highland, Whittier, Pierce Downer, Henry Puffer, Lester, and Indian Trail Schools and two of the middle schools, Herrick and O'Neill Middle School, are part of Downers Grove Grade School District 58. The other elementary schools, Prairieview and Elizabeth Ide and Lakeview Jr. High School, are part of Center Cass School District 66. Downers Grove has two Catholic Schools, St. Joseph's and St. Mary's of Gostyn, that enroll students from pre-school through 8th grade. The two high schools in Downers Grove, North and South, are part of Community High School District 99. They serve the entire community of Downers Grove, the majority of the village of Woodridge, and parts of Westmont, Darien, Lisle, Bolingbrook, Oak Brook and unincorporated Downers Grove and Lisle Townships.

Good Shepherd Lutheran School is a Christian Pre-K–8 school of the Wisconsin Evangelical Lutheran Synod in Downers Grove.

Downers Grove is home to the Avery Coonley School. Founded in 1906 and in its present location in Downers Grove since 1929, it is a private K–8 school, known for its math and science-oriented teaching as well as its focus on the arts and foreign language.

Downers Grove is also the home of Midwestern University, which trains osteopathic physicians and surgeons, physician assistants, pharmacists, physical therapists, occupational therapists, and dentists.

According to the American Community Survey 2010, Downers Grove has one of the nation's most educated citizenry, with 50.7% of individuals over the age of 25 holding bachelor's or advanced degrees; the national average is 27.9%.

== Infrastructure ==
=== Transportation ===
The main line of the BNSF Railway is also used by Metra commuter rail. Metra's BNSF Line has three stops in Downers Grove at Belmont Road, Main Street, and Fairview Avenue. Interstate Highways 355 and 88 pass through the community, as well as the major surface street US 34-Ogden Avenue. Downers Grove is served by the Pace Bus Service, a system of suburban public transportation.

The Grove Commuter Shuttle runs four routes throughout the community to two of the three train stations that are in the village. The shuttle also operates for the RotaryGrove Fest from remote parking lots on the north and south sides of the village, located at the respective north and south high schools.

=== Utilities ===
Downers Grove drinking water comes from Lake Michigan, via the DuPage Water Commission pipeline, which purchases the water from the City of Chicago Department of Water Management. Its electricity infrastructure is largely maintained by Commonwealth Edison Company (ComEd); its natural gas infrastructure was built by Northern Illinois Gas.

Household waste pickup is contracted out by the village to Republic Services, as is yard waste pickup; these are paid for by either household-purchased stickers or rented carts. Curbside recycling is free.

Waste water is treated by the Downers Grove Sanitary District.

== Notable people ==
- Muriel Anderson (b. 1960), composer and guitarist
- Kevin Atwater (b. 1997), singer-songwriter
- Ellie Banke (b. 2000), singer-songwriter
- Henry Williams Blodgett (1821–1905), United States federal judge and Illinois state representative
- Bob Bryar (1979–2024), drummer for My Chemical Romance
- Nick Burdi (b. 1993), baseball player
- Megan Callahan-Shah (b. 1985), 8-time Emmy Awards nominated writer for Saturday Night Live
- Sean Casten (b. 1971), U.S. congressman
- Greg Corner (b. 1974) bassist for Kill Hannah, co-host and musical director for JBTV
- Arthur Ducat (1830-1896), officer in the Union Army, insurance industry executive and fire prevention specialist
- Andy Dunn (b. 1979), CEO of Bonobos Inc.
- David Edwards (b. 1997), professional football player for the New Orleans Saints.
- Charles Draper Faulkner (1890–1979), architect
- Collin Fernandez (b. 1997), professional soccer player
- Sherron Francis (b. 1940), abstract artist
- Lauren Frost (b. 1985), actress best known as Ruby Mendel in Disney productions
- Cammi Granato (b. 1971), Olympic ice hockey champion, inductee in the Hockey Hall of Fame
- Tony Granato (b. 1964), NHL player and coach
- Kendall Gretsch (b. 1992), Olympic Paralympian biathlete and cross-country skier
- Savannah Harmon (b. 1995), ice hockey player
- Miles Harvey (b. 1960), journalist and author
- Tomlinson Holman, American film theorist, audio engineer, and inventor of Lucasfilm's THX sound system
- F. Kenneth Iverson (1925–2002) CEO of Nucor Steel
- Eric Jagielo (b. 1992), baseball player
- Nancy Johnson (b. 1974), sport shooter
- Matt Jones (b. 1983), professional hockey player formerly with the Phoenix Coyotes (NHL)
- Dan LeFevour (b. 1987), professional quarterback for Hamilton Tiger-Cats of the Canadian Football League
- Fred Faulkner Lester (1926–1945), Hospital corpsman in the United States Navy and awardee of the Medal of Honor.
- Eric Lichaj (b. 1988), professional soccer player, currently with Hull City and also a member of the US national team
- Emil Martinec (b. 1958), string theorist
- Thomas McCracken Jr. (born 1952), Illinois state legislator and lawyer
- Jim McDermott (b. 1936), U.S. representative representing Washington's 7th congressional district from 1989 to 2017
- Sherrill Milnes (b. 1935), baritone, formerly with the Metropolitan Opera
- Sandi Morris (b. 1992), pole vaulter, silver medalist at 2016 Olympics and 2017 World Championships
- Edward F. Mrkvicka Jr. (b. 1944), lay minister and financial expert
- Bryan Mullins (b. 1987), former basketball player and current Men's Basketball head coach at Southern Illinois University
- Bill Novey (1948–1991), head of special effects at Walt Disney Imagineering
- Emo Philips (b. 1956), comedian
- Lanny Poffo (1954–2023), professional wrestler
- "Shorty" Powers (1922–1979), NASA spokesman for Project Mercury
- Joe Principe (b. 1974), bass guitarist for Rise Against
- Denise Richards (b. 1971), actress and former model
- John Ridgely (1909–1968), actor, The Big Sleep, Air Force, Destination Tokyo
- Johnny Sain (1917–2006), baseball pitcher, 6-time World Series champion
- Randy Savage (1952–2011), Randall Mario Poffo, former professional wrestler and actor
- Luther Ely Smith (1873–1951), founder of the Gateway Arch National Park
- Barbara Stock (b. 1956), actress, Spenser: For Hire, Dallas
- Joseph Tumpach (1912–1968), Illinois state representative and motel owner
- Matthew West (b. 1977), contemporary Christian musician

== See also ==
- List of towns and villages in Illinois
