= Barrington Historic District =

Historic district in Illinois, United States

- U.S. National Register of Historic Places
- U.S. Historic district
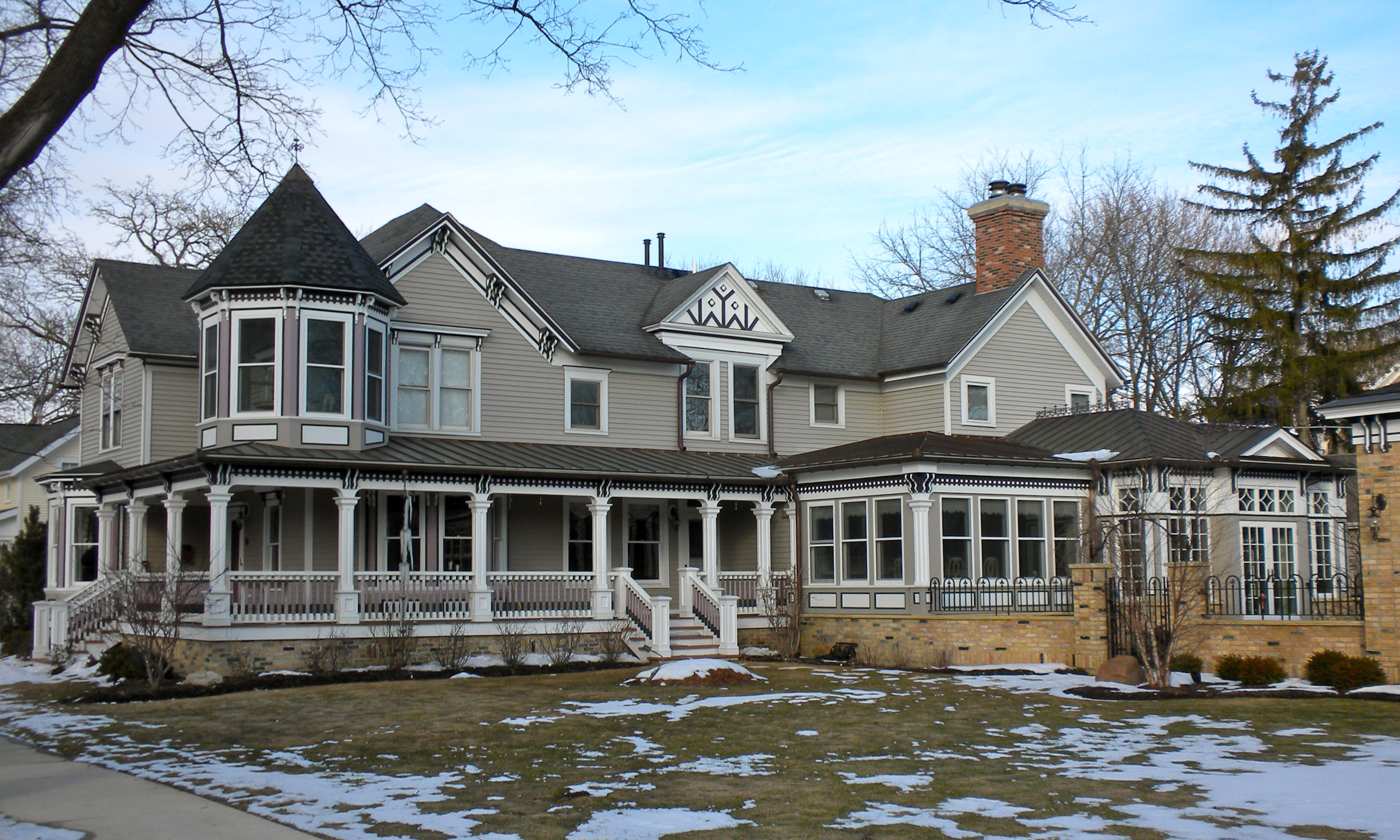
- House in the district in Cook County

- Location within Illinois Location within the United States
- Location: Roughly bounded by Chicago & Northwestern RR, S. Spring and Grove Sts., E. Hillside and W. Coolidge, and Dundee Aves., Barrington, Illinois
- Coordinates: 42°9′2″N 88°8′13″W
- Area: 92 acres (37 ha)
- NRHP reference No.: 86001047
- Added to NRHP: May 16, 1986

The Barrington Historic District is a 92-acre (37 ha) historic district in Barrington, Illinois. The district encompasses a residential area in southwest Barrington and is roughly bounded by the Chicago and Northwestern Railway tracks to the north, Dundee Avenue to the west, E. Hillside and W. Coolidge Streets to the south, and S. Spring and S. Grove Streets to the east. The large majority of the district is in Cook County, but about one square block is in Lake County, Illinois.

== History ==
The first settlers to Barrington, Illinois arrived in the 1830s. Barrington and Troy Townships organized in 1850. Barrington is named after Great Barrington, Massachusetts, the origin town of several early settlers. Benjamin Felter owned the original land claim for the south part of the village. Following a connection to the Chicago and North Western in 1854, the land was purchased by A. S. Downs as an investment. Downs sold the land to Robert Campbell, who divided the land for residential and commercial use. The town rapidly expanded and incorporation as Barrington Station followed in 1863. By 1865, the population was approximately 300. The name was changed to Barrington in 1873.

The area that became the historic district was designed a typical Midwestern grid. Most of the houses are built from wood, which was locally plentiful. This contributes to the homogeny of the district, despite a variety in architectural motifs. Its development followed a typical pattern of towns that transitioned from rural to suburban. The Barrington Historic District includes the Octagon House, one of the few such houses in the state. The Catlow Theater, which was added later to the NRHP, on West Main St. is just north of the district. The district was added to the National Register of Historic Places on May 16, 1986.

== Architecture ==
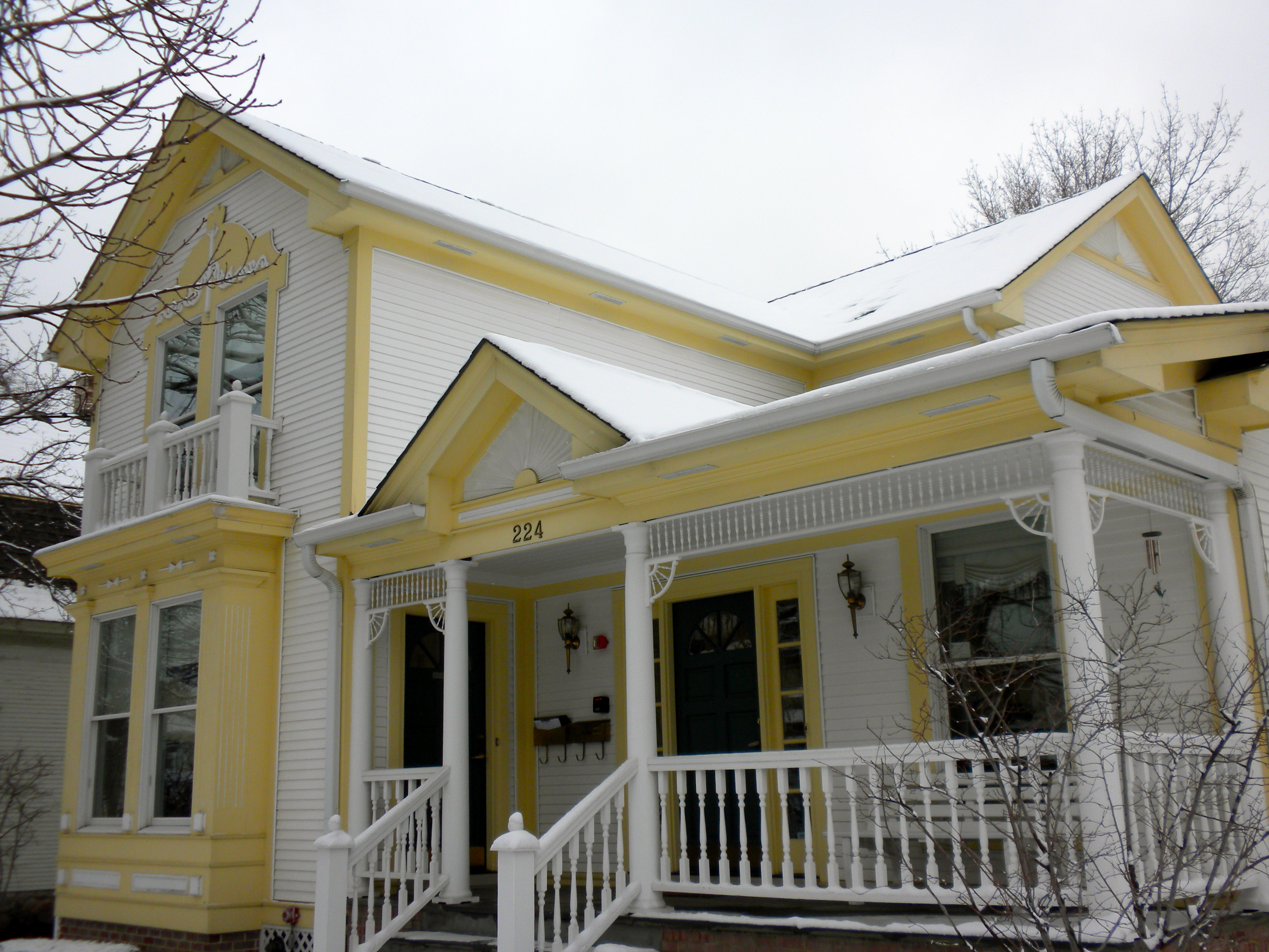
House at 224 W. Main St. in Lake County

The houses in the district were mainly built between 1860 and 1930 and were designed in a wide variety of architectural styles, including American Craftsman, Greek Revival, Gothic Revival, Italianate, Neoclassical, Queen Anne, and vernacular styles. Despite their differing architectural styles, the houses in the district have many similar characteristics; most of them are built partly or entirely with wood, and nearly all are one-and-one-half to two story buildings set back a similar distance from the street. Almost 80% of the homes in the district are contributing properties to the district's historical significance. The houses represent Barrington's architectural development, and their progression of styles is reflective of prevailing patterns in American architecture from 1860 to 1930.
