= CROWS =

Remote control system for heavy fire arms

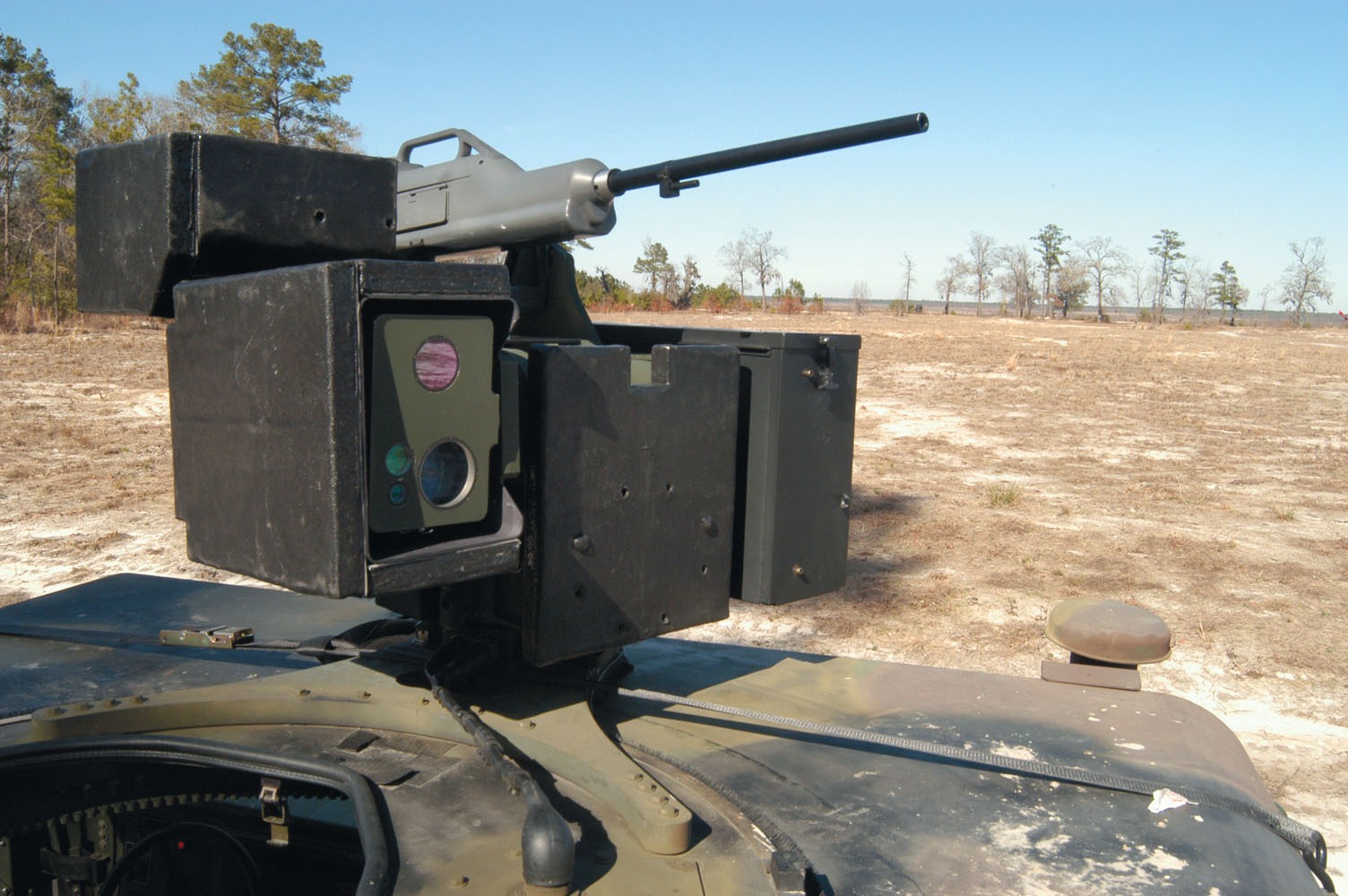
- CROWS with the XM312
- Type: Remote controlled weapon station
- Place of origin: United States

Production history
- Variants: See Variants

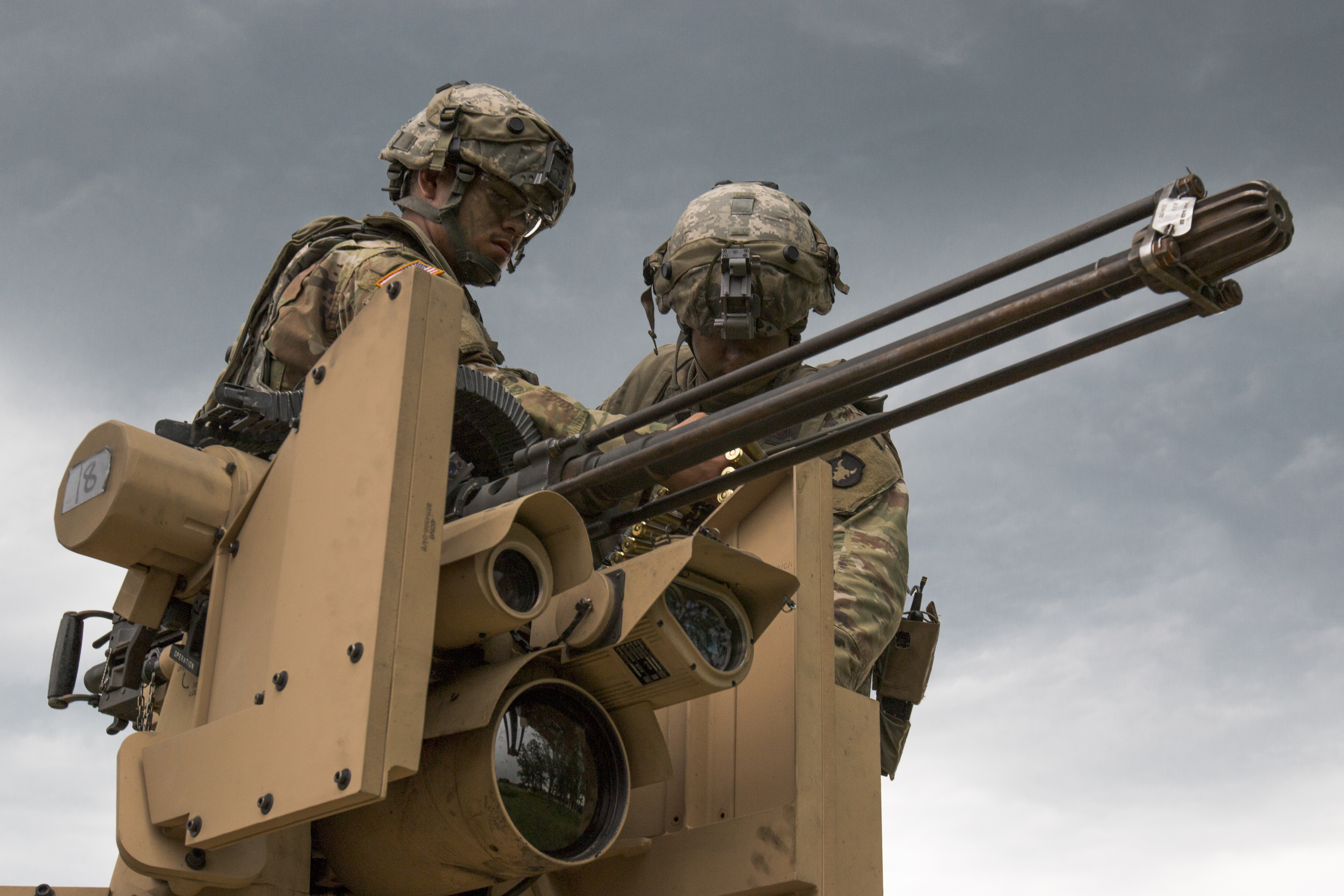
Common Remotely Operated Weapon Station (CROWS) mounted with M2 Browning .50 caliber machine gun fitted with a blank firing adapter

The Common Remotely Operated Weapon Station (CROWS) is a series of remote weapon stations used by the U.S. military on its armored vehicles and ships. It allows weapon operators to engage targets without leaving the protection of their vehicle. The U.S. military has fielded both the M101 CROWS and M153 CROWS II systems.

== System overview ==
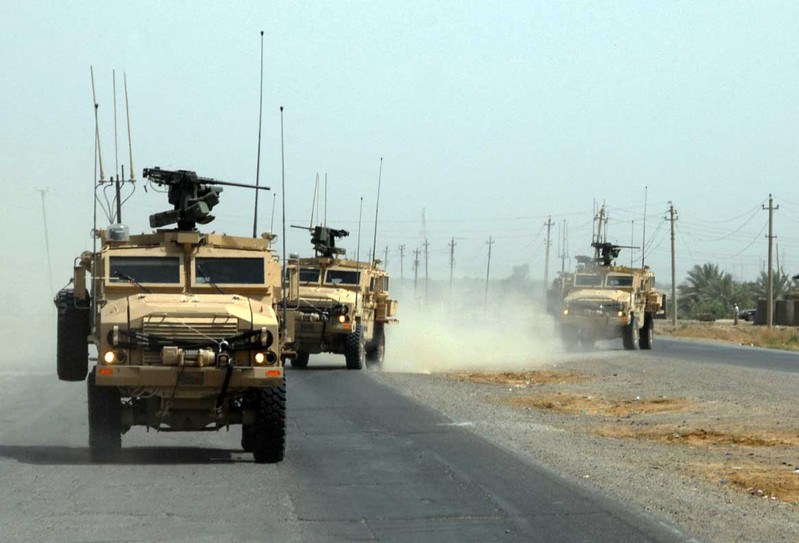
An RG-33 convoy with CROWS remote weapons stations attached

The CROWS system provides an operator with the ability to acquire and engage targets while inside a vehicle, protected by its armor. It is designed to mount on a variety of vehicle platforms and supports the Mk 19 grenade launcher, 12.7 mm M2 .50 Caliber Machine Gun, 7.62 mm M240B Machine Gun, and 5.56 mm M249 Squad Automatic Weapon. The system is composed of two parts: the mount which is fixed to the exterior of the vehicle and the control group. The mount is capable of 360° rotation and −20° to +60° elevation and is gyro-stabilized. The sight package includes a daylight video camera, a thermal camera and an eye-safe laser rangefinder. It is also furnished with a fully integrated fire control system that provides ballistic correction. The weight of the weapon station varies accordingly due to different armament modules: 74 kg (163 lb) light, 135 kg (298 lb) standard (including the naval version), and 172 kg (379 lb) for CROWS II.

The control group mounts inside the vehicle (behind the driver's seat on the Humvee). It includes a display, switches and joystick to provide full remote control of the weapon system. This enables the fighting crew to operate from inside armored combat vehicles, while still maintaining the ability to acquire and engage targets. Its camera systems can identify targets out to 1,500 m away, and the mount's absorption of about 85% of weapon recoil delivers an estimated 95% accuracy rate, as well as the ability to track targets moving 25 mph (40 km/h). Large ammunition boxes enable for sustained firing periods, carrying 96 rounds for the Mk 19, 400 rounds for the M2, 1,000 rounds for the M240B, and 1,600 rounds for the M249. Each CROWS costs $190,000.

== Variants ==
=== M101 CROWS ===
The first supplier for the CROWS program was Recon Optical (Barrington, IL) with their RAVEN SRWS product. As part of the first CROWS contract, the Recon Optical RAVEN R-400 RWS was fielded in 2004 in Iraq, employed by special forces, military police, infantry and transport units.

=== M153 CROWS II ===
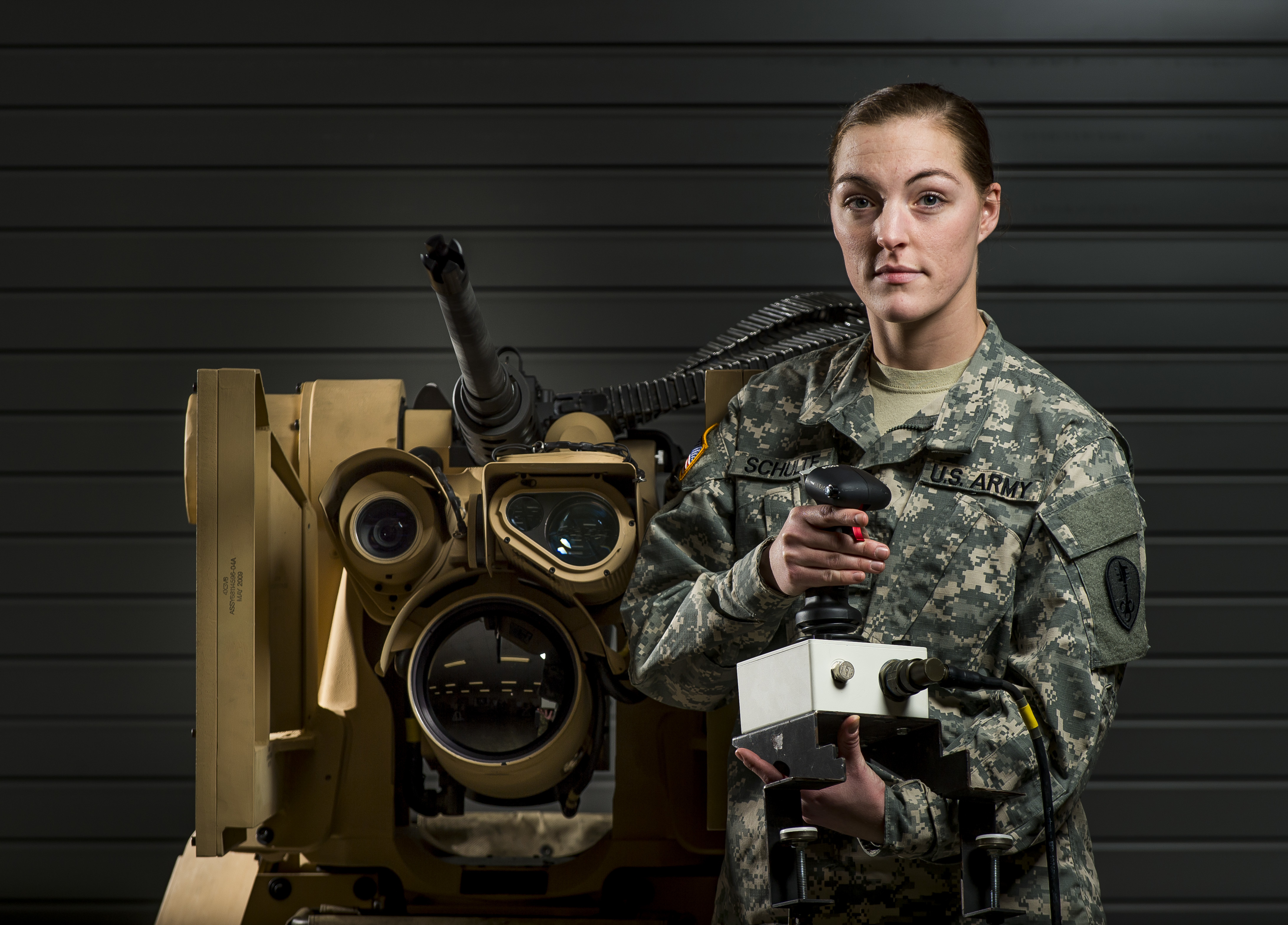
Soldier posing with an M153

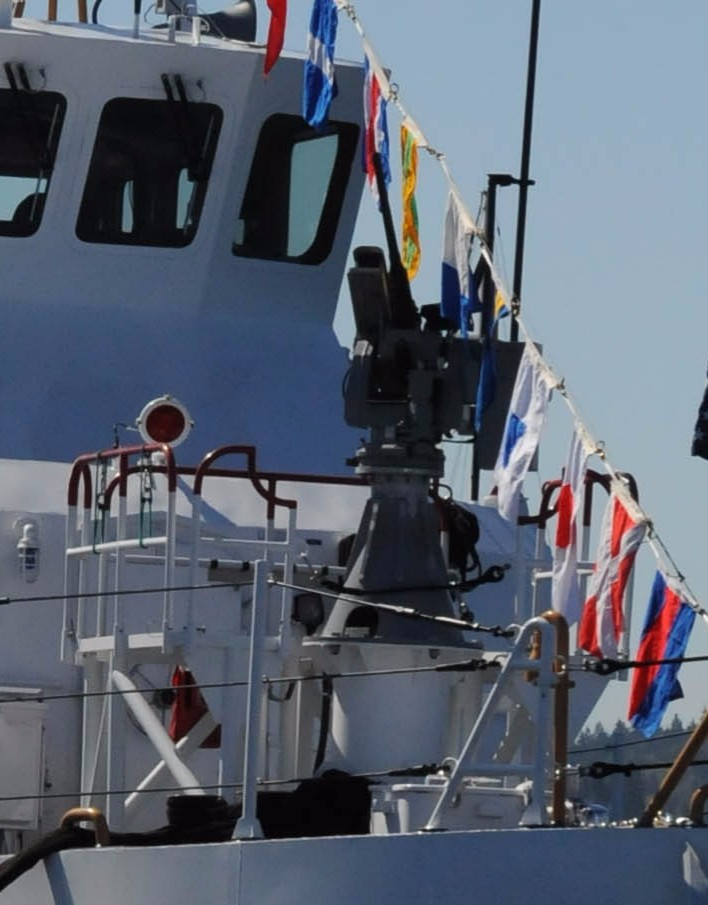
The USCGC Sea Devil (WPB-87368) mounts a Sea PROTECTOR MK50 with an M2 Browning .50 caliber machine gun.

After an open solicitation Kongsberg Protech Systems (Kongsberg Gruppen, Norway and Johnstown, PA) won the CROWS II contract with a variant of their M151 PROTECTOR, which is also used on the Stryker M1126 infantry carrier vehicle. Kongsberg received a framework contract of more than US$1 billion for the delivery of up to 6,500 CROWS systems to the US Army and a first purchase order exceeding US$300 million As of October 2009, the framework contract has been almost completely converted to fixed contracts. At the very end of 2009 the agreement was extended to include 10,349 systems.

Between the M151 and M153 variants KONGSBERG has delivered more than 18,000 systems to the U.S. Armed Services. These systems are in-service within every branch of the U.S. military and many US agencies. It is employed in various versions of the Humvee, Buffalo MRVs, RG-31 Nyalas, RG-33s, the Army's M1126 Stryker APC, and was soon integrated into the Oshkosh M-ATV, JERRV, Caiman, and MaxxPro.

==== Sea PROTECTOR MK50 ====
A nautical version of the CROWS II weapons system has been developed and deployed by the U.S. Navy on its Mark VI patrol boats . It allows vessels to engage speedboats piloted by suicide bombers at longer ranges. Gyrostabilization is particularly important for a weapon carried by a small vessel being buffeted by waves when traveling at high speed. In Navy service, the CROWS II is referred to as the "MK50 Gun Weapon System (GWS)."

==== CROWS-J ====
In May 2018, Stryker ICVs of the 2nd Cavalry Regiment deployed to Europe to test the CROWS-Javelin, a version of the M153 turret fitted with an FGM-148 Javelin anti-tank missile tube. This enables the vehicle gunner to detect and destroy heavy armor out to 3 km (1.9 mi) without requiring a soldier to dismount. The Army plans to up-gun all its Stryker brigades by adding a 30 mm cannon to half of the ICVs in rifle and scout platoons while adding the CROWS-J to the other half, roughly 80 vehicles with each per brigade.

=== CROWS III ===
By September 2013, the U.S. Army had over 8,000 CROWS systems in use. The new CROWS III incorporates a laser dazzler to temporarily blind suspicious individuals rather than needing to open fire, additional cameras on the side and rear of the turret to expand situational awareness without rotating the turret, and an infrared laser pointer to paint objects at night. The larger version of CROWS is equipped with a Javelin missile launcher.
