= Alfonso Iannelli =

American sculptor

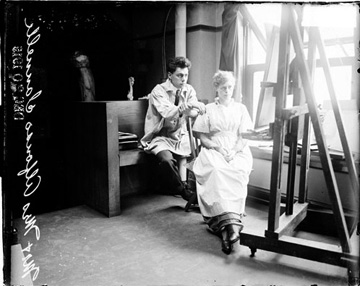
- Born: 17 February 1888; Andretta, Italy
- Died: 23 March 1965; Chicago, Illinois
- Known for: Sculpting and industrial design
- Movement: Streamline Moderne, Prairie School

Alfonso Iannelli (February 17, 1888 – March 23, 1965) was an Italian-American sculptor, artist, and industrial designer.

Based in Chicago for most of his life, Iannelli was born in Andretta, Italy on February 17, 1888. He came to America in 1898. He studied to be a sculptor under Gutzon Borglum, later famous for Mount Rushmore.

From 1910 to 1915, he designed posters for the vaudeville acts appearing at the Orpheum Theatre in Los Angeles. Architect John Lloyd Wright saw his work, and the two became friends. John introduced Iannelli's work to his father, Frank Lloyd Wright, who invited Iannelli to work with him on his Midway Gardens project in 1914. Iannelli created several of the Midway's Sprite sculptures for Wright. Wright, however, claimed credit for the pieces, leading to a bitter division and the ultimate demise of their partnership.

He also collaborated with Chicago architect Ernest A. Grunsfeld III on several Art Déco-style plaques in 1929 to 1930 for the Adler Planetarium. These contributions include the zodiac signs of astrology and depictions of the planets in their mythological forms. About this time, Ianelli also designed an exterior fountain for the Riverside Studio in Tulsa, Oklahoma. Noted architect Bruce Goff completed the building in 1929 for a local music teacher named Patti Adams Shriner. The Riverside Studio was listed on the U.S. National Register of Historic Places in 2001.

Afterward, Iannelli collaborated with noted Chicago area Prairie School design architects Purcell and Elmslie, notably on the Woodbury County Courthouse, and with architect Barry Byrne for several church projects in the American Midwest, and one in Ireland. Iannelli also worked on numerous exhibitions at the 1933 Century of Progress (Chicago World's Fair), including the Radio Flyer and Havoline Thermometer buildings.

He went on to open Iannelli Studios in Park Ridge, Illinois, in collaboration with his wife Margaret, a talented illustrator and artist in her own right. Iannelli Studios grew to become one of Chicago's most famous art studios at the time. They included more collaborators and expanded into commercial design, advertising, product design, and architectural interiors.

Among Iannelli's most famous industrial designs are the Streamline Moderne-inspired C-20 "Coffeemaster" vacuum coffeemaker and T-9 electric toaster for Sunbeam Products, which the company introduced as its flagship modern appliances in honor of the 1939 New York World's Fair. In the mid-1930s, he created for the Wahl Eversharp company an Art Deco design for a fountain pen and accompanying mechanical pencil. http://www.richardspens.com/ref/profiles/coronet.htm Later known as the Eversharp Coronet, the rare pen is one of the most coveted fountain pens among pen enthusiasts today. Iannelli also designed many significant interiors for churches and movie theaters, two of which remain in operation today: the Pickwick Theater in Park Ridge and the Catlow Theater in Barrington, Illinois. He also designed the large-scale Rock of Gibraltar relief on the facade of the Prudential Building (now called One Prudential Plaza) in Chicago.

He was the father of Fons Iannelli, the photo-journalist and grandfather of Kim Iannelli, who under the name Kim King played with Lothar and the Hand People.

He died in Chicago on 23 March 1965.

== Images ==
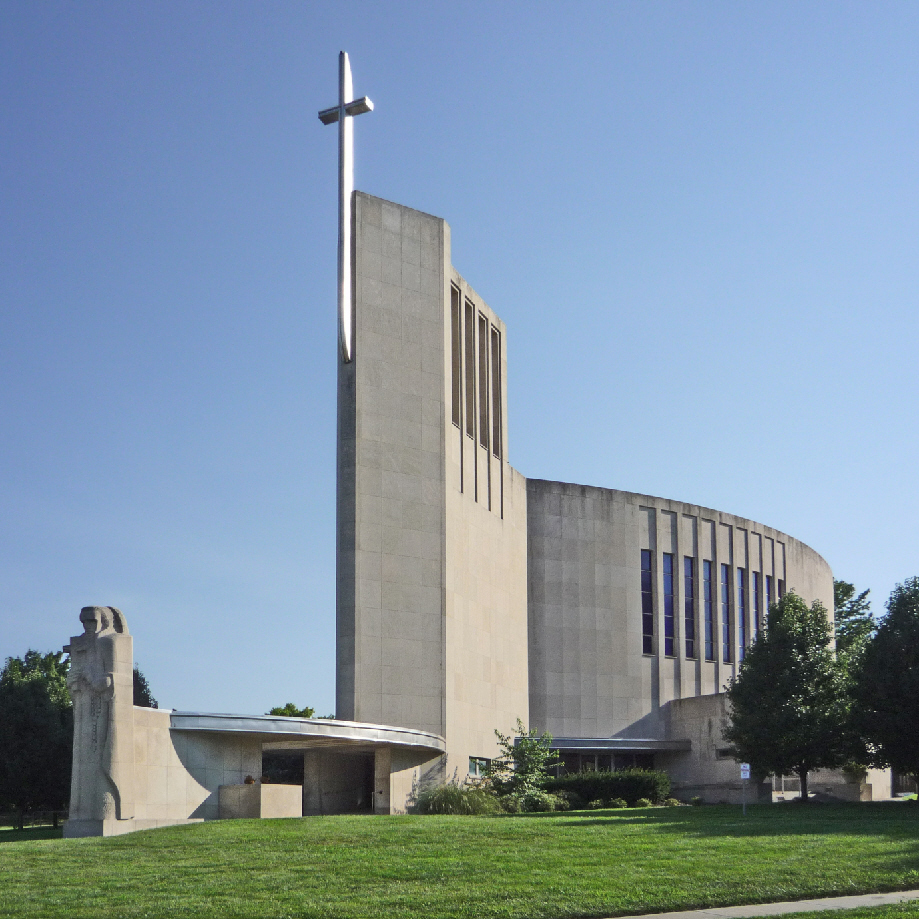
Church of Saint Francis Xavier, Kansas City, Missouri, one of several churches designed by architect Barry Byrne incorporating architectural sculpture by Iannelli

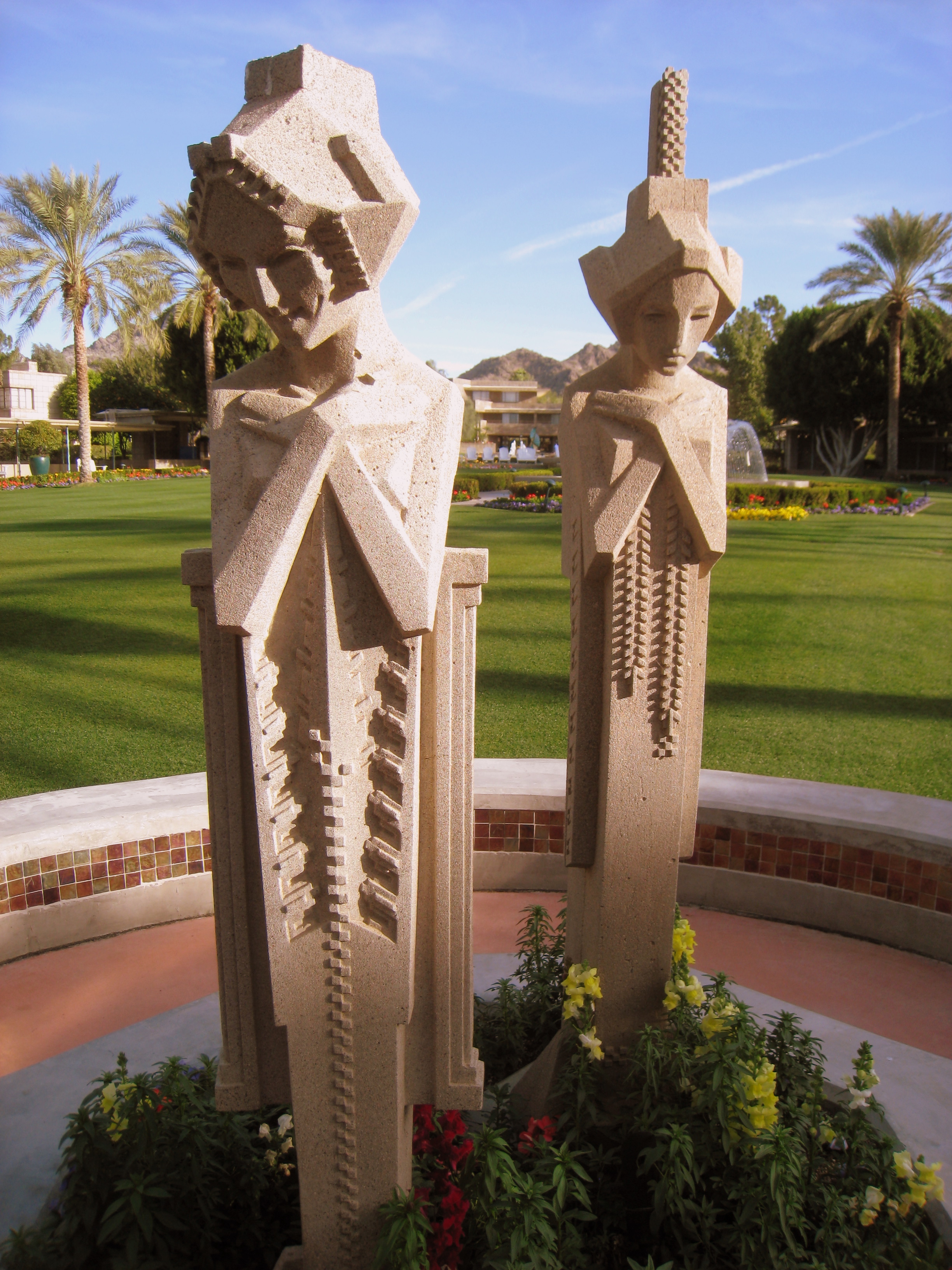
Replicas of the Midway Gardens Sprites, located at the Arizona Biltmore Hotel, Phoenix, Arizona

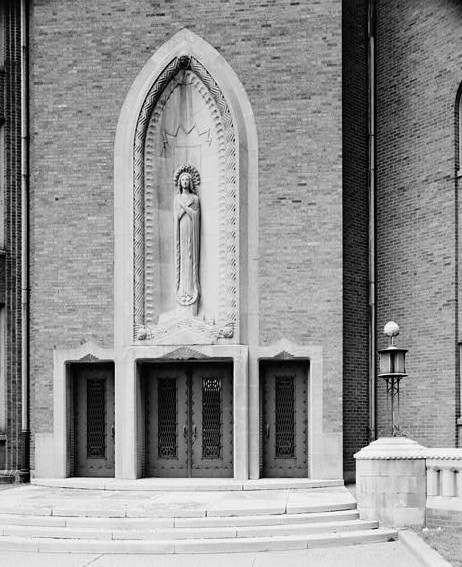
Figure of Mother Mary above the entrance of the Immaculata High School, Chicago (removed circa 1981).The statue is now located at the former home and studio of Iannelli at 255 N. Northwest Highway, Park Ridge.
