= Health World Inc. =

US-based non-profit organization

- Type: Nonprofit
- Industry: Health curriculum
- Founded: 1993; 33 years ago in Barrington, Illinois
- Headquarters: Barrington, Illinois
- Key people: Peter Rusin
- Website: www.healthworldeducation.org

Health World Inc. is a 501(c)(3) non-profit organization founded in 1993 in Barrington, Illinois. Health World's mission is to promote health and safety education by providing children with the information they need to build healthy lives.

Health World was founded by a group of community residents led by Peter Rusin, CEO of JFK Medical Center at the time. The rising number of health-related issues confronting children and adolescents concerned this group of community leaders. They chose to focus and build health curriculums dedicated specifically to the needs of children pre-K through 8th grade.

In 1995 Health World opened the $12 million, 85,000 square foot children's museum JFK Health World in Chicago, Illinois. Health World has since taught over 4,000,000 kids about making healthy choices. The museum would teach kids about making correct health choices, as well as give safety information and lectures to kids, such as teaching the Heimlich maneuver.

In 2006, Health World expanded its regional education efforts when it closed the museum and transitioned to outreach education. In 2013, Health World made its pre-K through 8th grade programs and education resources available nationwide via an online eLearning platform. Currently, Health World programs are being utilized by educators in all 50 states.
