= St. Anne Catholic Community (Barrington, Illinois) =

Church in Illinois, US

Coordinates: 42°09′19.1″N 88°07′58.3″W

St. Anne Catholic Church and School
- St. Anne Catholic Church and School
- Country: USA
- Denomination: Roman Catholic

History
- Dedication: 1884

Specifications
- Capacity: 1300-seat, two-story Worship Space, a 160-seat chapel

Administration
- Archdiocese: Archdiocese of Chicago

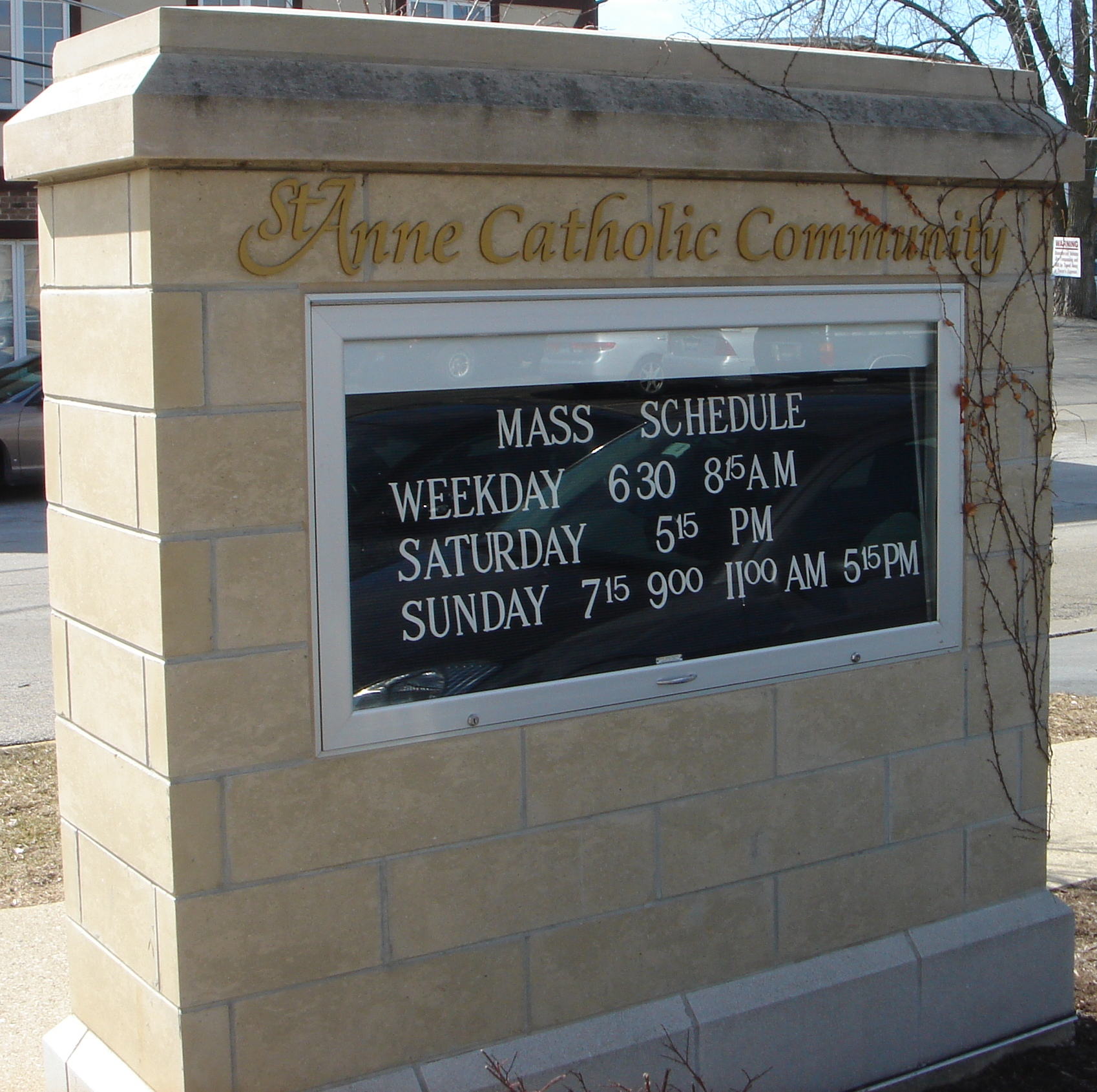

St. Anne Catholic Church is a Roman Catholic parish of the Archdiocese of Chicago located in suburban Barrington, Illinois approximately 32 miles (51 km) northwest of Chicago. Originally dedicated in 1884, St. Anne is the only Catholic parish in the Barrington area.

In 2000, the church was expanded significantly to accommodate its 3,700+ registered parishioner families; at the time, its Campus Development Plan was the largest in the modern history of the Archdiocese. Rev. John Trout is the current pastor, replacing Rev. Bernard J. Pietrzak, who served the community through 2023.

== History ==
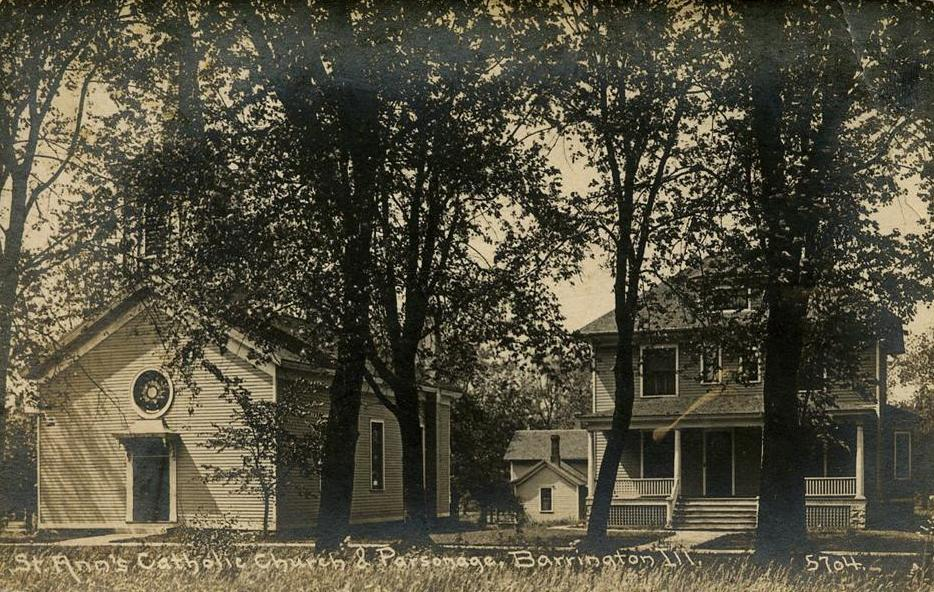
Exterior of the original St. Anne Church, left, in 1910; a neo-Gothic limestone church replaced this wooden structure in the early 20th century.

=== Early history ===
St. Anne's history dates to the 1860s, when missionary priests celebrated the Mass in private Barrington homes, then a largely rural area. The original St. Anne Church was dedicated in 1884, and St. Anne's maintained a resident pastor beginning in 1905. St. Anne was named for St. Anne, the mother of the Virgin Mary.

In or around 1949, St. Anne dedicated a new church at the southeast corner of Franklin and Ela Streets. The church served as the main worship space for the parish until the construction of the current St. Anne campus.

=== Campus Development Plan ===
In 1995, St. Anne approached several design firms regarding a multimillion-dollar update and expansion of its undersized facilities. The parish had outgrown its original church building by such a wide margin that some weekly Masses were held in the school gymnasium. After careful consideration, parish leaders chose lead architect RuckPate and YHR Partners to jointly facilitate a comprehensive master plan for the parish expansion.

YHR and RuckPate designed the new worship space to employ non-traditional, antiphonal seating with a shallow mezzanine to maintain the intimacy of the worship area. The project also included improvements to other parish families on site for fellowship, religious education, parochial education, youth activities, senior activities, outreach ministries, and administration functions. The parish dedicated the new building on April 30, 2000. Later that year, the parish received the 2000 Association of Licensed Architects Design Award. Among numerous other neo-Gothic artworks, the newly constructed Worship Space features twelve near life-size sculptures of saints by Jay Hall Carpenter.

== Features ==
In 2000, the newly expanded church received the Association of Licensed Architects Award of Excellence in Architecture for its limestone and neo-Gothic design. The current St. Anne campus features a 1300-seat, two-story Worship Space, a 150-seat chapel (site of the church dedicated in 1949), and the St. Anne School for elementary education. The Campus also contains a Gathering Space and Parish Library, in addition to the parish rectory and administrative offices. Since its expansion, the parish has grown to over 4,000 registered member families.

Until recently, the church's longest-subscribing parishioner was Jim Hollister, who had been registered with the parish since his baptism in 1925 and died in Barrington in November 2009.

== St. Anne Catholic School ==
In 1927, the Sisters of Mercy founded and staffed the first St. Anne School, one of the earliest parochial schools in Lake County. Three years later, the School Sisters of St. Francis took charge of the school and still minister in the parish today. The co-educational school numbers approximately 500 students, teaching children from three-year-old preschool through eighth grade. The U.S. Department of Education has recognized St. Anne's School as a Blue Ribbon School.

== Image gallery ==
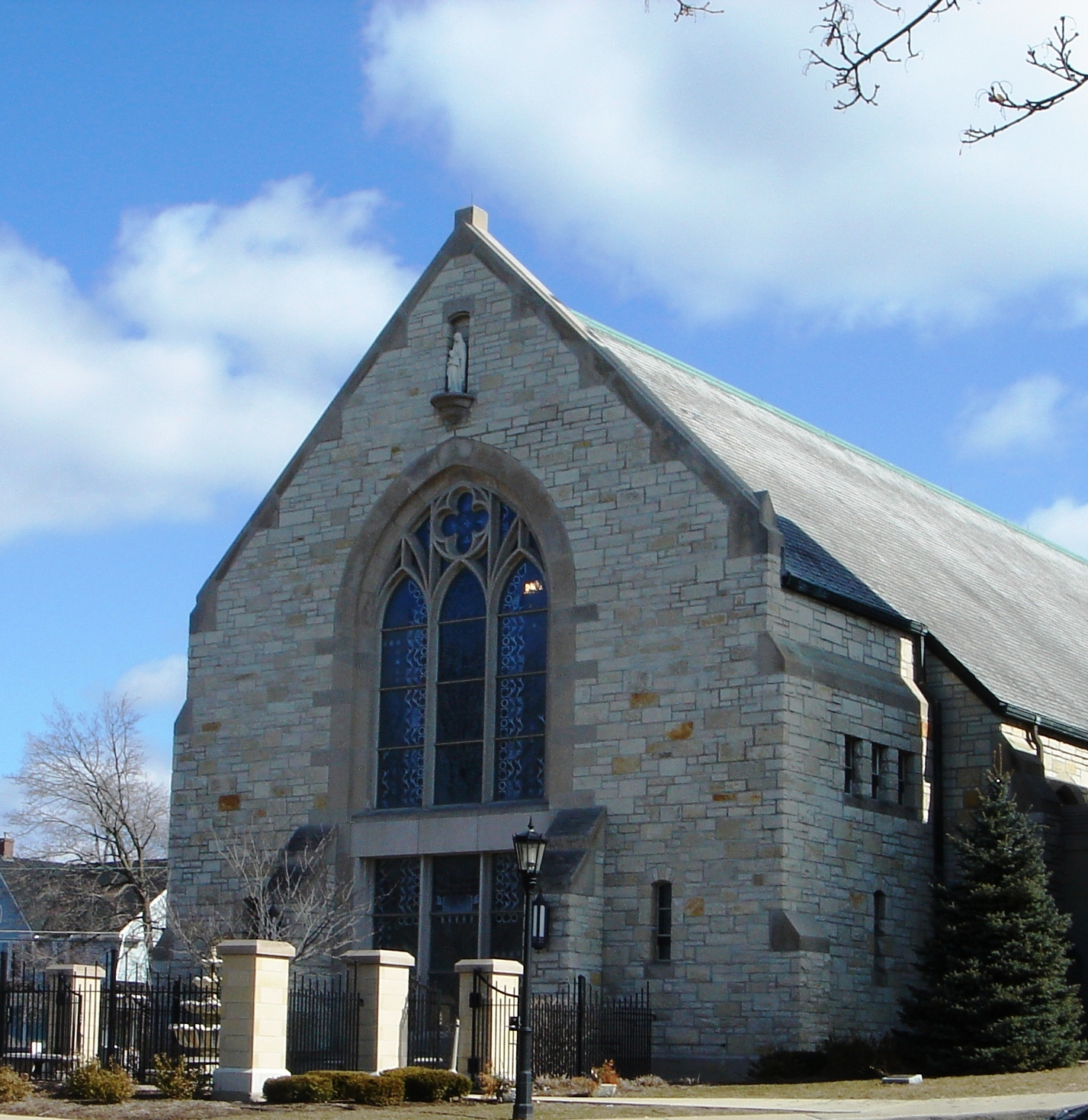
Exterior of the Daily Mass Chapel, with seating for 160.

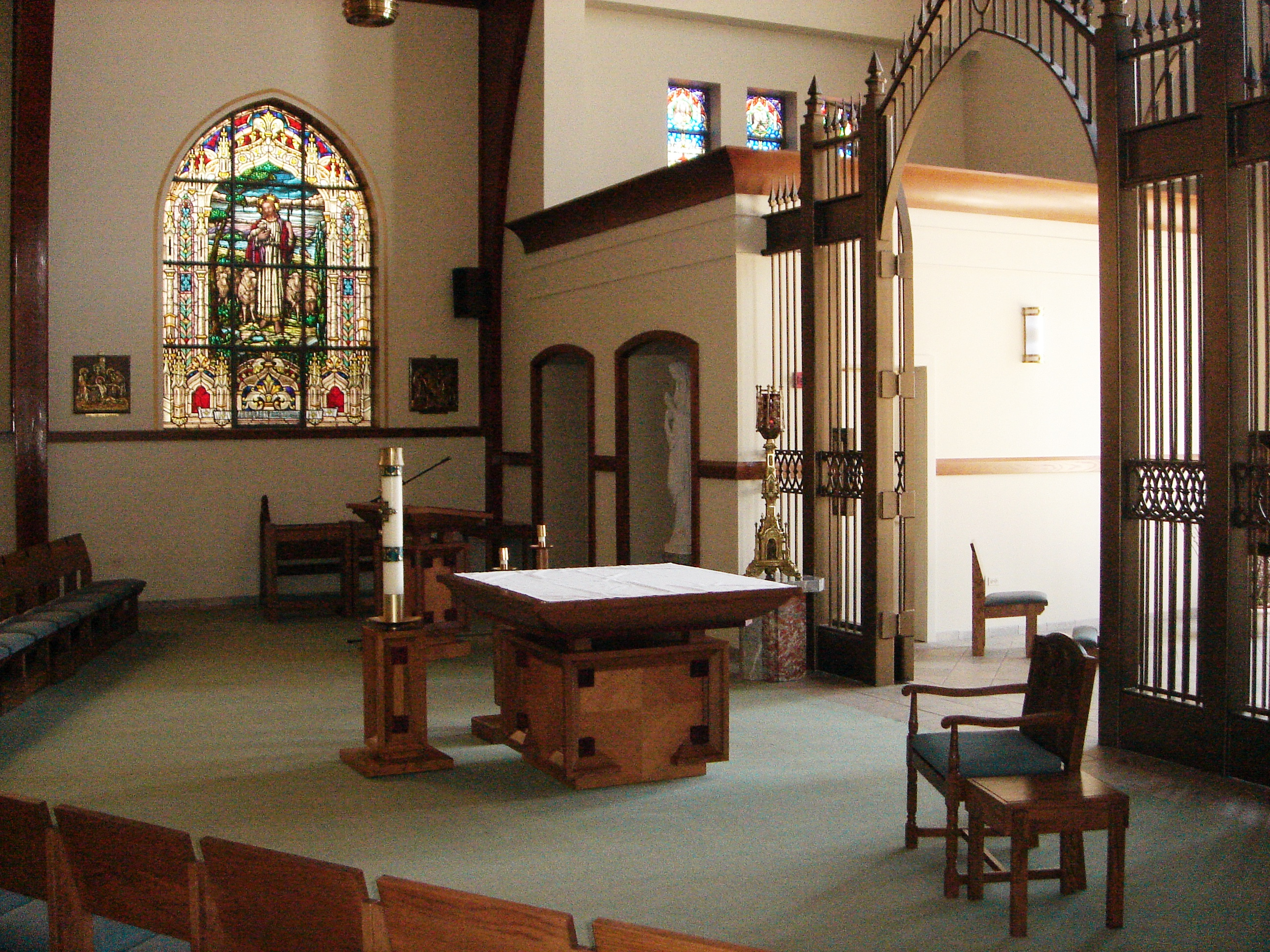
Interior of the Daily Mass Chapel.

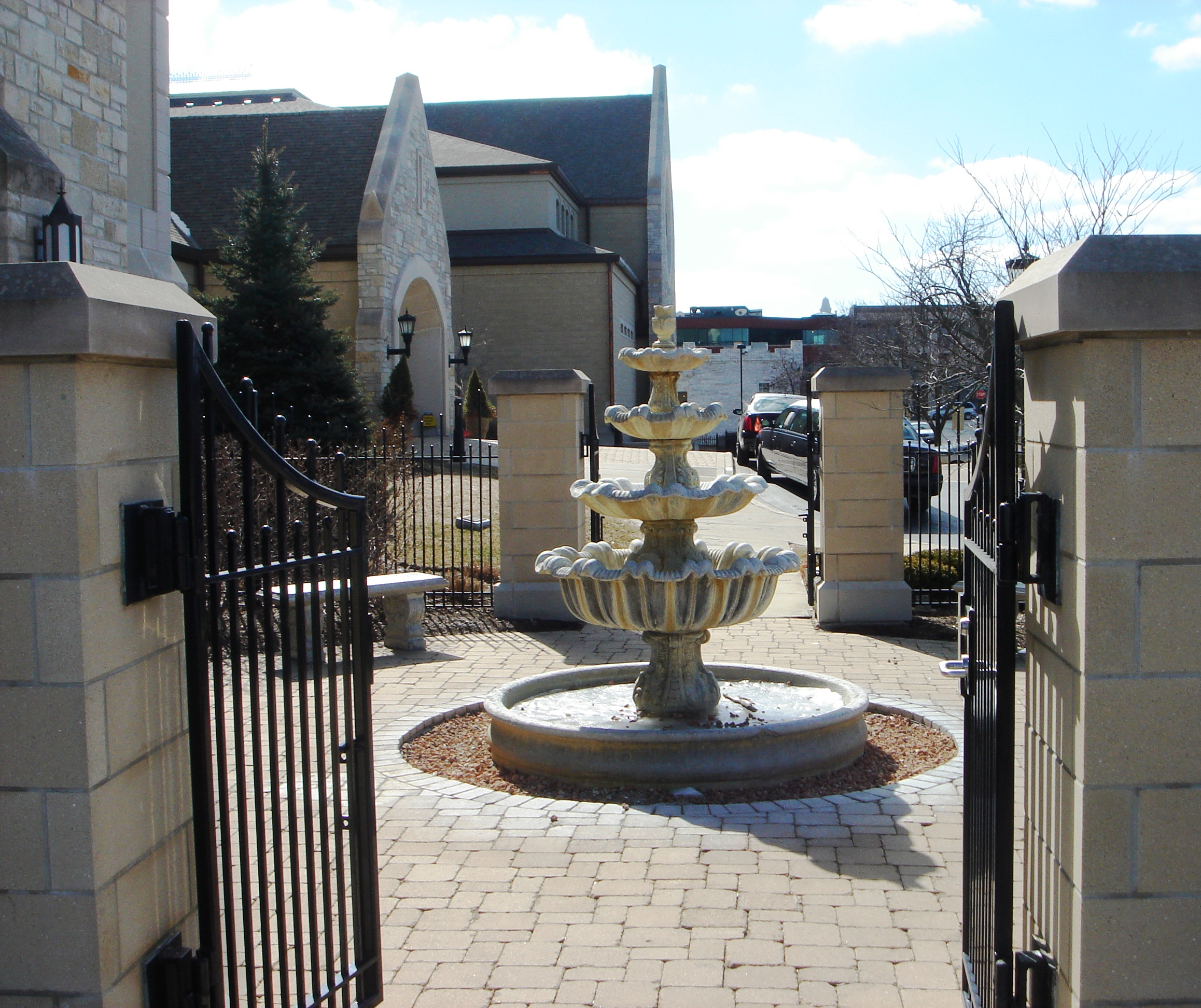
The Chapel Fountain and Entrance to the Gathering and Worship Spaces as seen from the north.

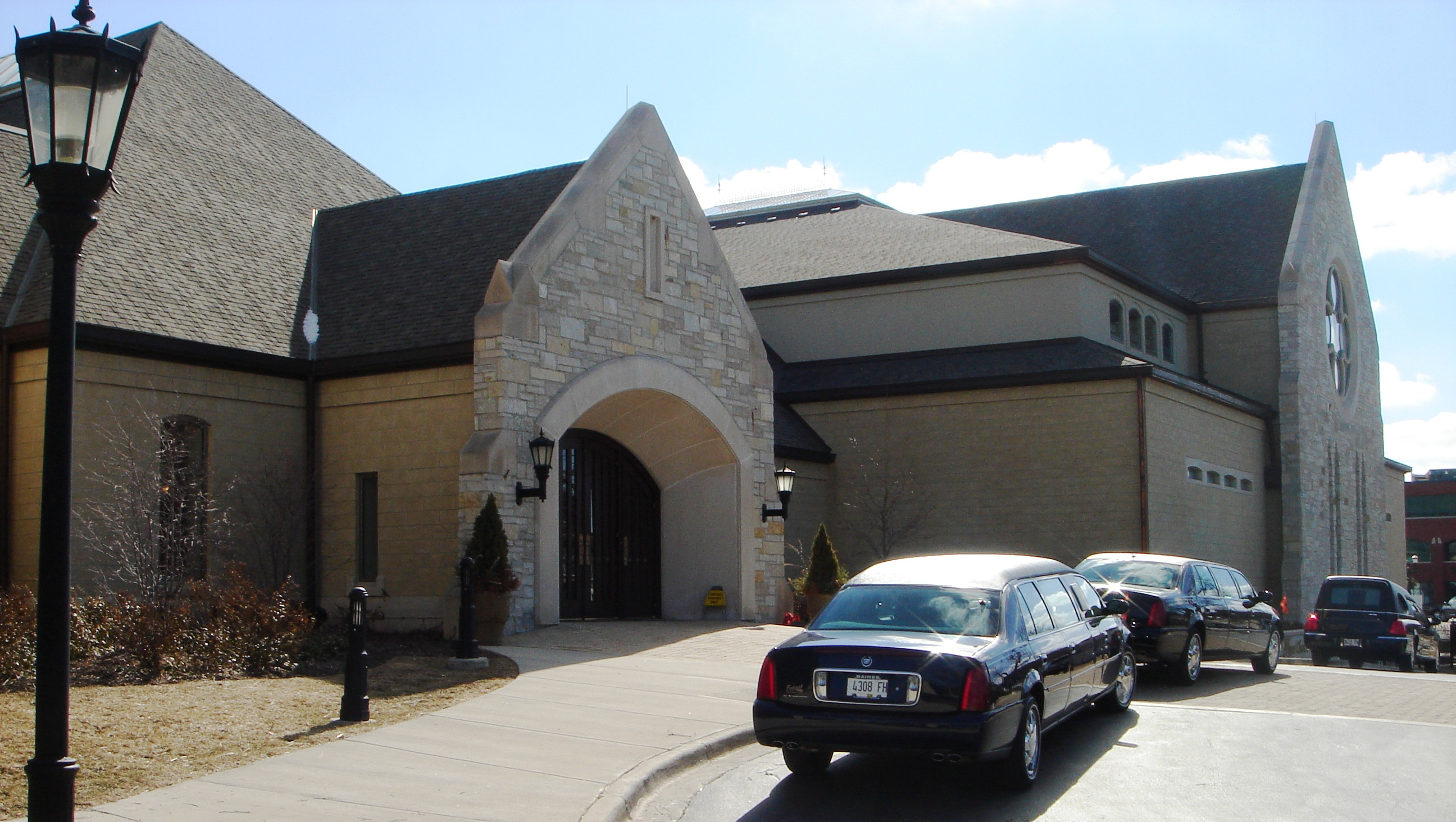
Worship Space entrance.

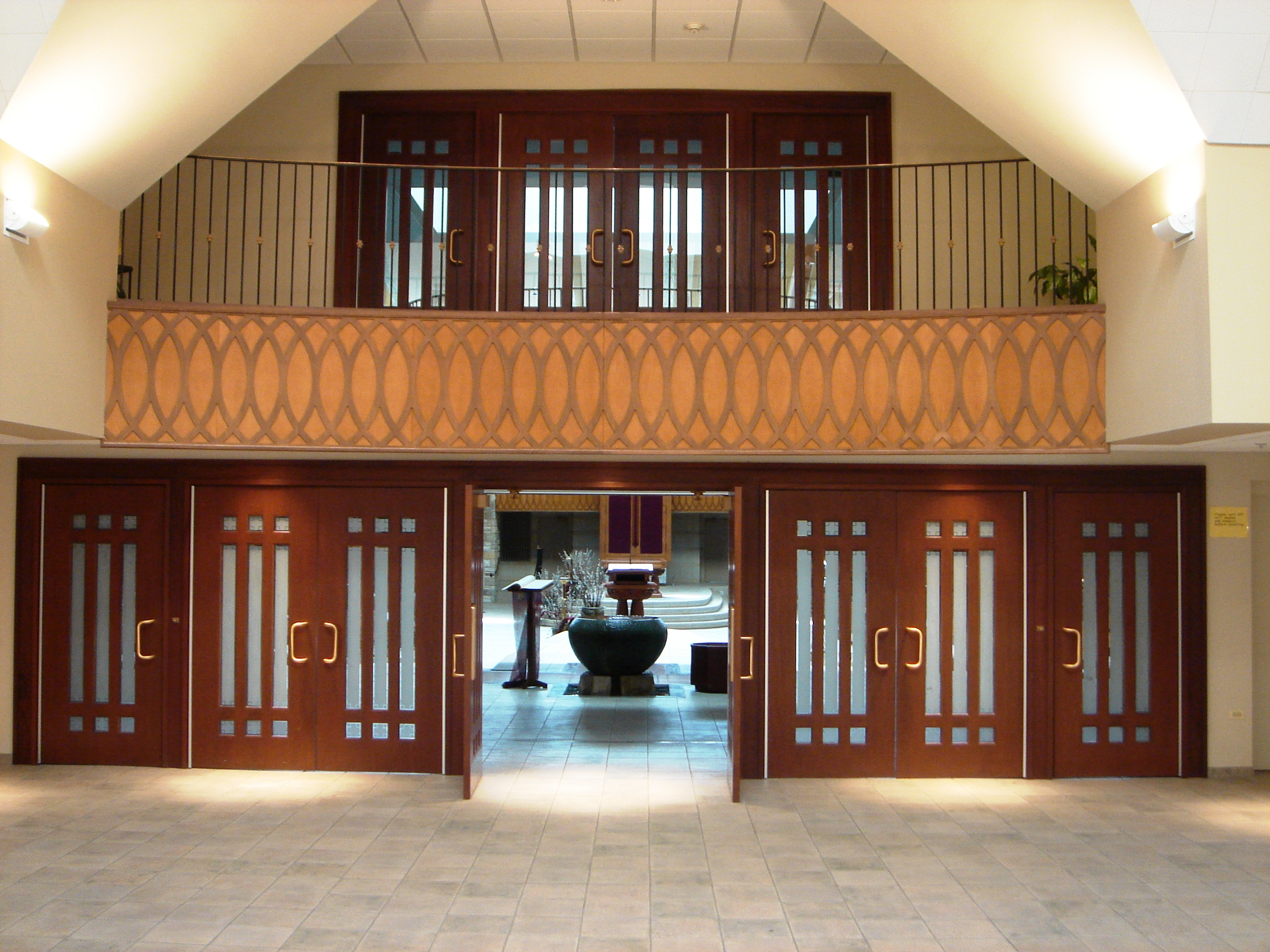
Entrance from the Gathering Space to the Worship Space.

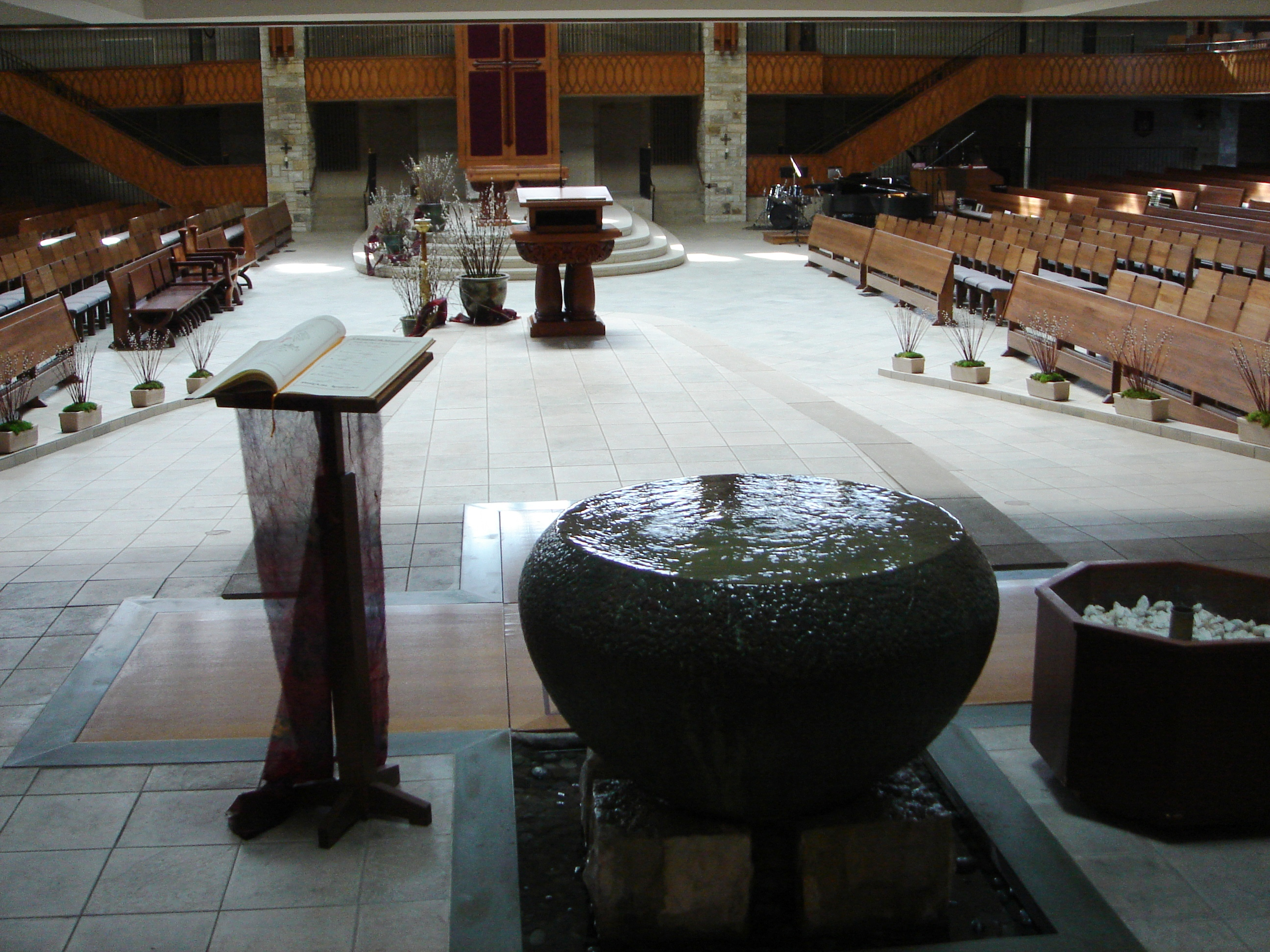
1300-seat Worship Space, including baptismal font.

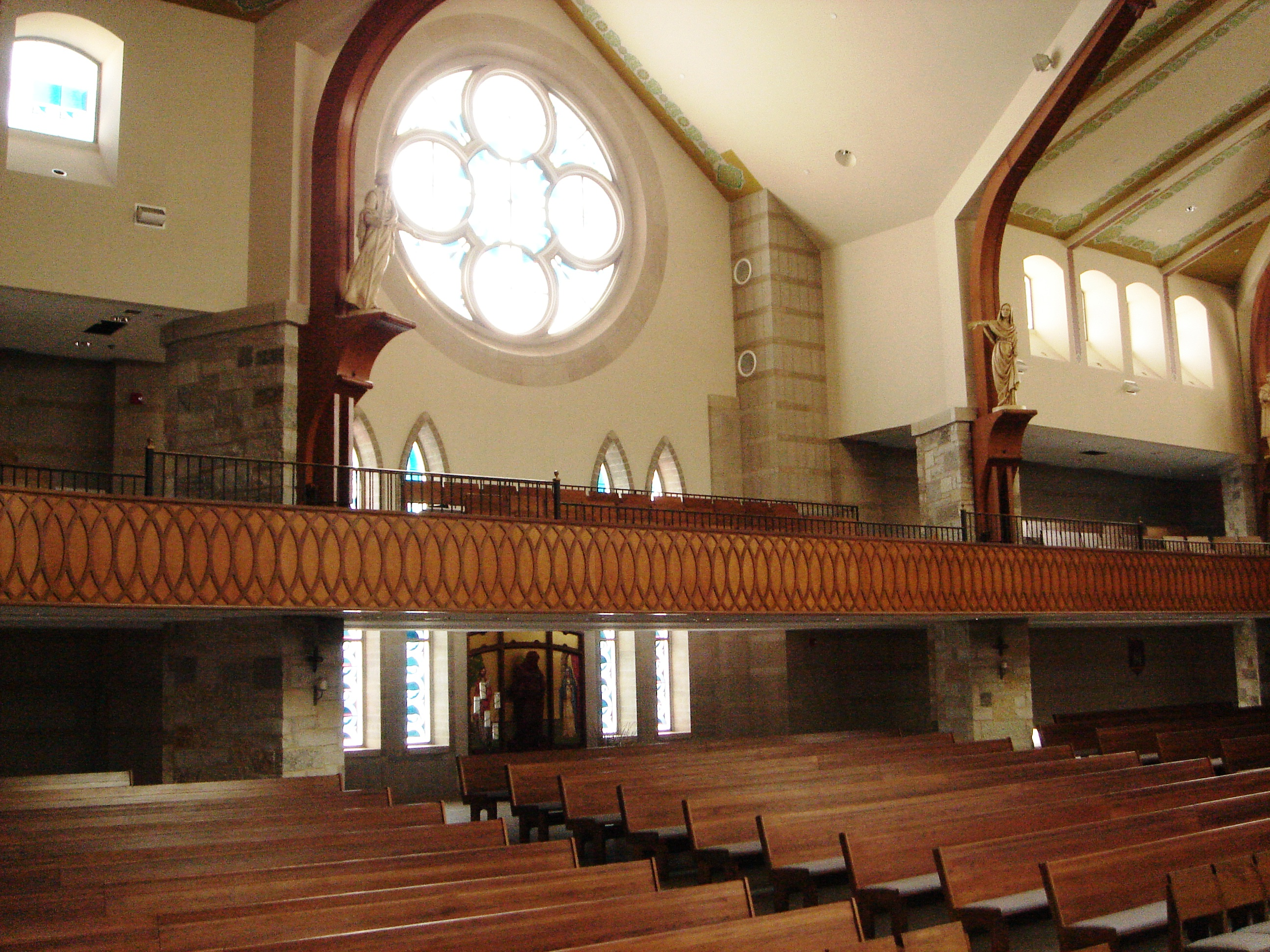
East side of the Worship Space, featuring sculptures by Jay Hall Carpenter.

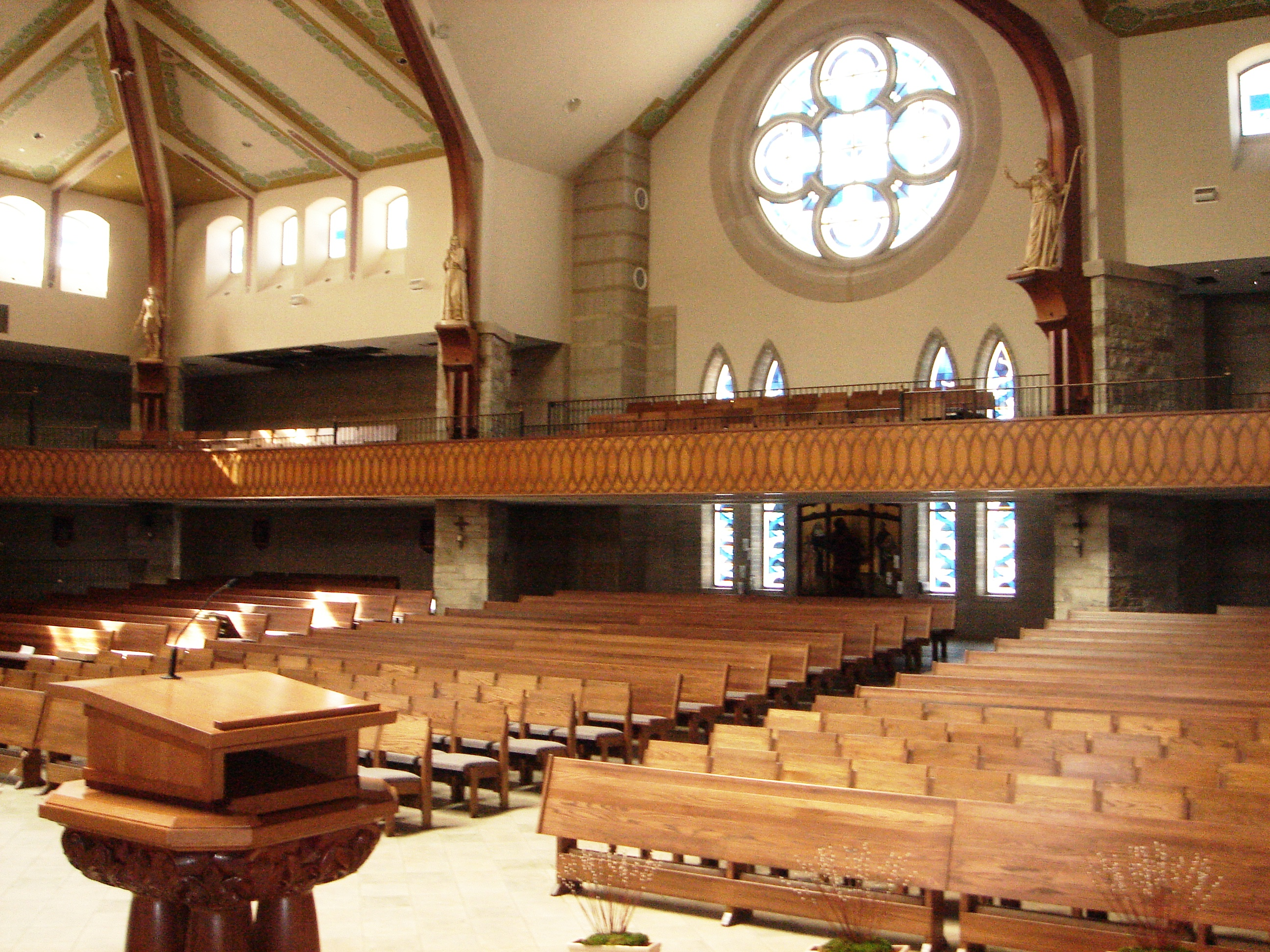
West side of the Worship Space, including lectern.
