= Catlow Theater =

- Catlow Theatre
- U.S. National Register of Historic Places
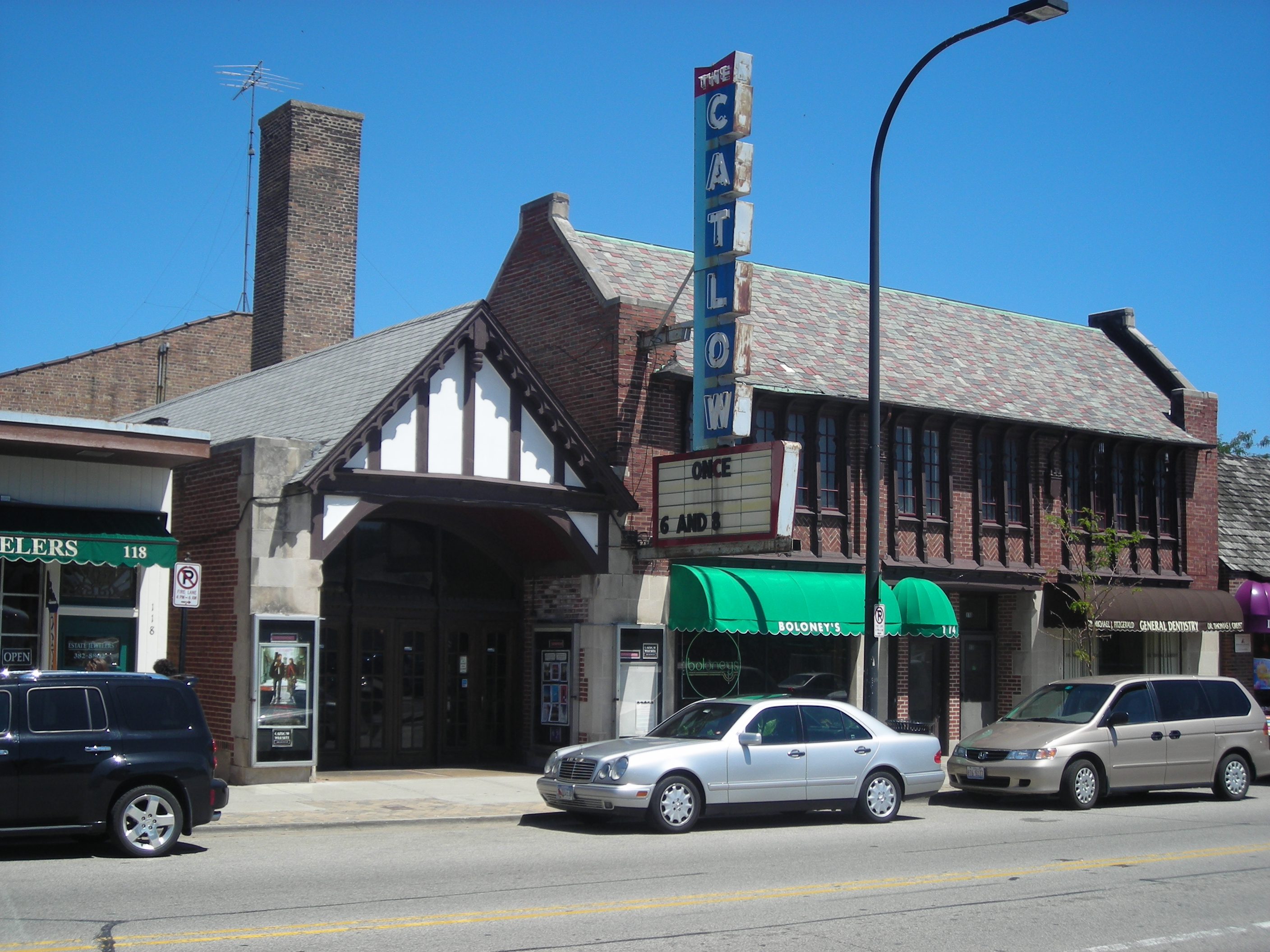
- Location: Barrington, Illinois
- Coordinates: 42°9′15.82″N 88°8′11.51″W
- Architect: Betts & Holcomb, Alfonso Iannelli
- Architectural style: Tudor Revival
- NRHP reference No.: 89001112
- Added to NRHP: August 21, 1989

The Catlow Theater is a historic single-screen movie theater located in downtown Barrington, Illinois, United States.

== History ==
Wright Raymond Catlow (1901–1983) was a businessman in Barrington whose father, Joseph Goodman Catlow (1853-1926), had commissioned an auditorium, on West Station Street, in 1916, a gathering place for dances and community meetings. Seeking to follow his father's legacy and build a community building, Catlow commissioned the theater in May 1927.

Betts & Holcomb served as the architects and the interiors were designed by Prairie School sculptor and designer Alfonso Iannelli. The theater was primarily designed in the Tudor Revival style ornamented to portray a medieval English hall. In large part due to Iannelli's involvement, the Catlow is listed on the National Register of Historic Places. Iannelli's Catlow design includes the stenciling on the Catlow's ceiling, walls and beams along with the sculpted gargoyle-like heads that border each ceiling truss and the "Fountain Idyll" sculpture in the inner lobby. Other highlights include three coat-of-arms wall murals, iron wall sconces, the detailed woodwork on both of the organ lofts and the original hand painted stage curtain.

Catlow's brother Chester played the theater organ. The theater originally showed silent films and featured vaudeville performances on Sundays. These performances attracted talent such as Gene Autry and Sally Rand. In 1934, the theater began to show only movies. Catlow sold the theater to film booker Ed Skehan in 1964. On August 21, 1989, the theater was recognized by the National Park Service with a listing on the National Register of Historic Places.

The Catlow Theater was purchased by long-time Barrington residents Brian and Julianne Long in the fall of 2022. The newly-formed non-profit Catlow1927 Foundation is dedicated to restoring the theater in time for the upcoming 100-year anniversary in 2027.
