= Octagon House (Barrington, Illinois) =

Historic house in Illinois, United States

- U.S. National Register of Historic Places
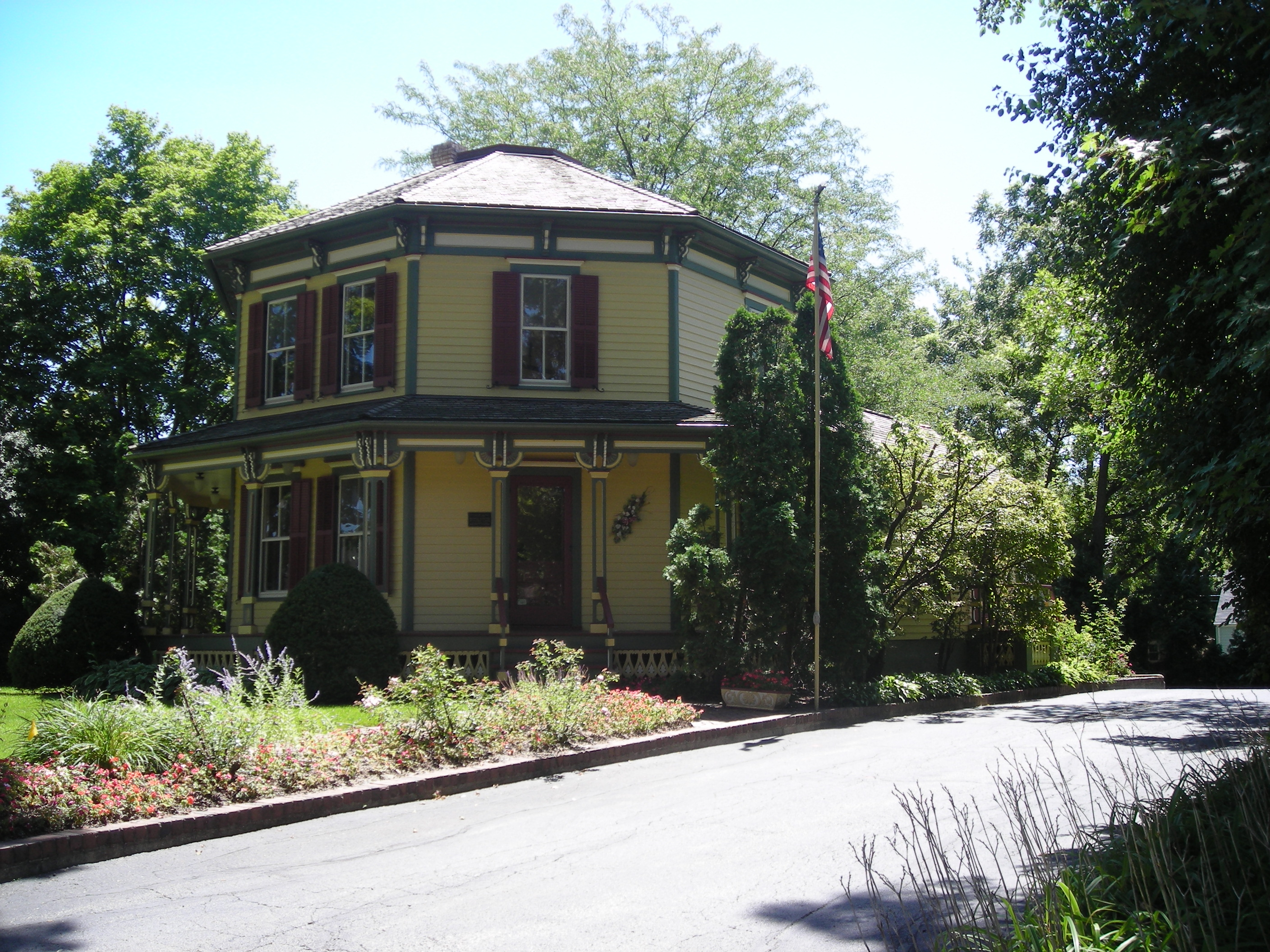

- Location within Illinois Location within the United States
- Interactive map showing the location of Octagon House
- Location: 223 W. Main St., Barrington, Cook County, Illinois, United States
- Coordinates: 42°9′14.4″N 88°8′24.0″W
- Area: less than one acre
- Built: circa 1860
- NRHP reference No.: 79000820
- Added to NRHP: March 21, 1979

The Octagon House, also known as Hawley House, in Barrington, Illinois is a mid-19th century residence listed on the National Register of Historic Places.

== History and features ==
The Octagon House is an eight-sided, two-story structure originally intended for residential use. According to the National Register of Historic Places Inventory Nomination Form submitted in June 1978, the home was built in or around 1860 by a Mr. Brown, likely Joseph Brown. The structure is entirely wood-framed and covered with clapboards.

The Octagon House's most notable features are the intricately carved and jig-sawed brackets supporting the roof of the porch enclosing the house and similarly detailed screens that cover the foundation from view. Structural members of the house are fastened by hand-forged flat nails and glue. No machined nails were used in the original structure. At the time of its nomination, the house was painted all white; however, its current occupants have since repainted the structure in a combination of yellow, burgundy, and olive.

Despite its eight-sided exterior, the interior of the Octagon House is reported as "quite conventional," and the rooms are divided so no octagonal corner is visible from the inside. The small spaces that develop from fitting a rectilinear floorplan into an octagonal space are used as coat nooks, and on the west side of the house, as a stair closet. The door frames and mouldings are hand carved in a simple medallion pattern.

There have been at least two additions to the structure—the first, sometime before 1920, removed the rear porch and added a kitchen addition to the southwest corner of the house. Upon purchasing the home in 1951, the Hawley family added a small bedroom extension at the structure's rear southeast corner.

== See also ==
- Barrington, Illinois
- List of octagonal buildings and structures
- List of octagonal buildings and structures in the United States
- Octagon House (disambiguation)
- Orson Squire Fowler
