= Andretta =

- Comune
- Comune di Andretta
- Location within Italy Location within Campania
- Coordinates: 40°56′18″N 15°19′33″E
- Country: Italy
- Region: Campania
- Province: Avellino (AV)
- Frazioni: Mattinella

Government
  - Mayor: Giuseppe Guglielmo

Area
  - Total: 43.65 km^{2} (16.85 sq mi)
- Elevation: 840 m (2,760 ft)

Population (31 December 2017)
  - Total: 1,853
  - Density: 42.45/km^{2} (109.9/sq mi)
- Demonym: Andrettesi
- Time zone: UTC+1 (CET)
  - Summer (DST): UTC+2 (CEST)
- Postal code: 83040
- Dialing code: 0827
- ISTAT code: 064003
- Patron saint: Saint Anthony of Padua
- Saint day: 5 September
- Website: Official website

Andretta is a town and comune in the province of Avellino, Campania, Italy.

== Geography ==
The little town, whose population was greatly reduced by emigration, rises on a high hill in the Apennines dominating the valley of the Ofanto river.

== History ==
The area has traces of settlement from the Bronze Age (1000 BC), as well as Samnite and Roman remains. The earliest historical mention however is in 1124, when it was ruled by the Norman Folleville; other lords were the Zurlo and Caracciolo families.

== Twin towns ==
- Ramapo, United States, since 1996
