= Recon Optical =

Defense contractor

Recon Optical, Inc.
- Company type: Private
- Industry: Defense
- Founded: 1922 in Chicago, Illinois, United States
- Headquarters: Barrington, Illinois, United States, until closed
- Products: Airborne cameras, ground stations, stabilization systems

Recon Optical (Recon/Optical, Inc. or ROI) was a privately held defense contractor providing electro-optical and stabilization products.

== History ==
Founded in 1922 by Eugene W. Fuller as Chicago Aerial Survey Company, it was later known as Chicago Aerial Industries or CAI, before changing to Recon/Optical. Originally based in Chicago, by 1960 it had moved to Barrington, Illinois, when it was visited by presidential candidate John F. Kennedy.

For many years a subsidiary of Bourns, Inc., Recon/Optical was purchased by Goodrich Corporation in 2008, becoming part of Goodrich ISR Systems. Recon Optical FPT was then purchased by Electro Optic Systems Holdings (EOS Defense), the US subsidiary of Australian company Electro Optic Systems Holdings Ltd, in 2009, and the Illinois office was closed in 2012.

== Products/technology ==
With its focus initially on airborne cameras (first film, then digital), Recon/Optical provided end-to-end intelligence, surveillance and reconnaissance (ISR) systems, Force Protection Technology (FPT), and optical components for military and government use. It produced optic systems in the infra-red, including forward looking infrared (FLIR), and visible imaging (with haze reduction technology); in both frame and line scanning cameras. Recon/Optical also provided ground-stations to view and analyze the images being gathered by the aircraft. Using its gimbal technology for aiming and stabilizing cameras, Recon/Optical then moved into providing stabilization technology for remotely operated weapon systems.
