= Barrington, Illinois =

- Village
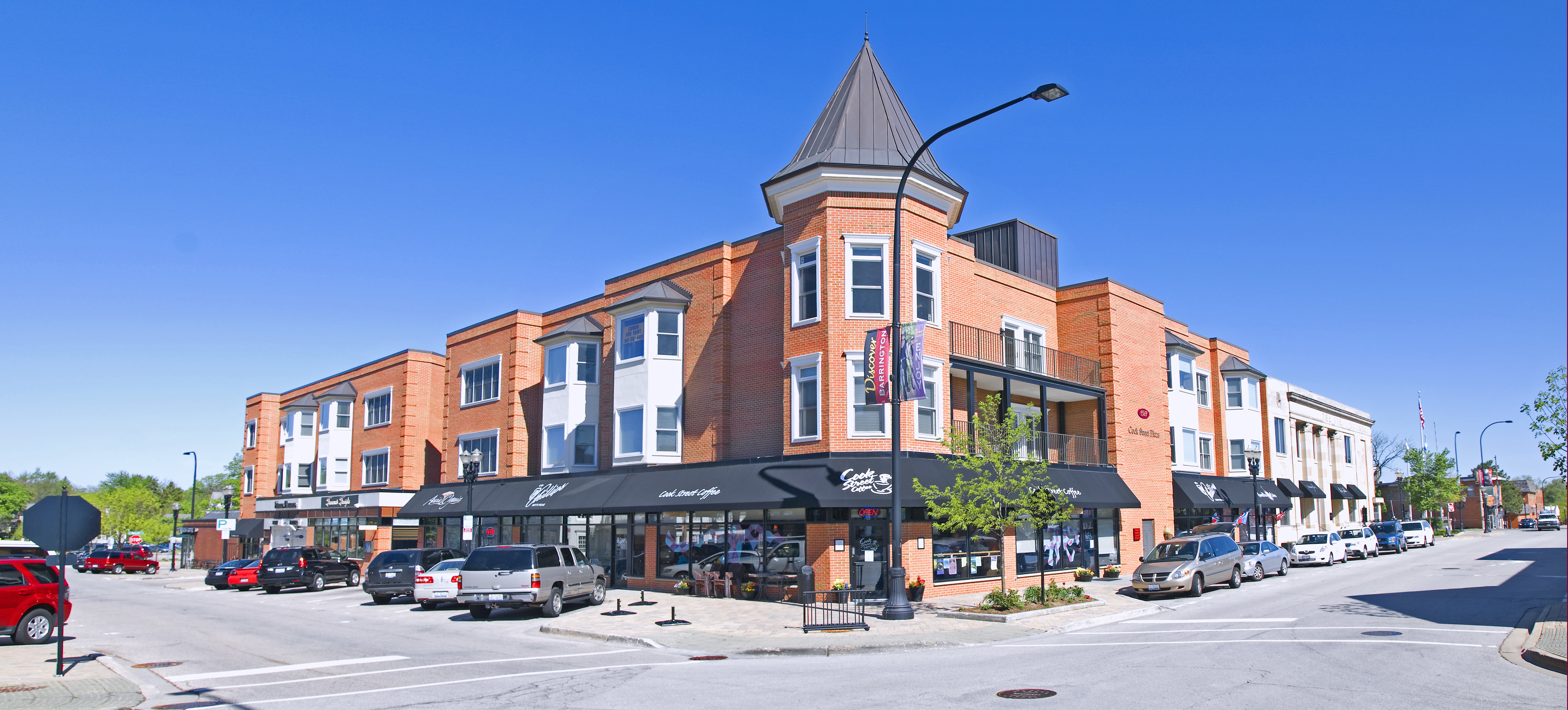
- Downtown Barrington

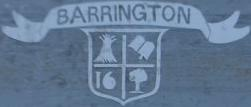
- Flag Seal
- Motto: "Be Inspired"
- Interactive map of Barrington, Illinois
- Location within Chicago metropolitan area Location within Illinois Location within the United States
- Coordinates: 42°09′03″N 88°07′18″W !-- Area/postal codes and others -->
- Country: United States
- State: Illinois
- County: Lake, Cook
- Township: Barrington, Palatine, Cuba, Ela
- Founded: 1865

Government
  - Type: Village

Area
  - Total: 4.79 sq mi (12.41 km^{2})
  - Land: 4.61 sq mi (11.93 km^{2})
  - Water: 0.19 sq mi (0.48 km^{2})
- Elevation: 843 ft (257 m)

Population (2020)
  - Total: 10,722
  - Density: 2,327/sq mi (898.5/km^{2})
- Time zone: UTC−6 (CST)
  - Summer (DST): UTC−5 (CDT)
- ZIP Codes: 60010 60011
- Area codes: 847, 224
- FIPS code: 17-03844
- GNIS feature ID: 2398037
- Website: www.barrington-il.gov

Barrington is a village in Cook and Lake counties in the U.S. state of Illinois. The population was 10,722 at the 2020 census. It is part of the Chicago area.

== History ==
=== Early history ===
The original settlers of the Barrington area were the indigenous peoples of the Prairie Potawatomi or Mascouten tribes, which later divided into the Potawatomi, Ojibwe, and Odawa tribes. Many local roads still in use, including Algonquin Road, Rand Road, Higgins Road, and St. Charles Road, were originally Native American trails. For many years, Barrington was considered part of the Northwest Territory, then the Illinois Territory.

=== 19th century ===
By treaty dated September 26, 1833, ending the Black Hawk War, the Ojibwe, Odawa, and Potawatomi ceded to the United States all lands from the west shore of Lake Michigan west to the area that the Ho-Chunk ceded in 1832, north to the area that the Menominee had previously ceded to the United States, and south to the area previously ceded by an 1829 treaty at Prairie du Chien, a total of approximately 5,000,000 acres (20,000 km^{2}). Through this treaty, the Sauk, Meskwaki, Ho-Chunk, Ojibwe, Odawa, and Potawatomi tribes ceded all title to the area east of the Mississippi River. Between 1833 and 1835, the U.S. government paid approximately $100,000 in annuities and grants to the Potawatomi, Odawa, and Ojibwe tribes, presumably as payment for the land.

Following this treaty, pioneers traveled from Troy, New York, via Fort Dearborn (now the city of Chicago) to live in Cuba Township in Lake County. The first white pioneers known to have settled in Barrington township were Jesse F. Miller and William Van Orsdal of Steuben County, New York, who arrived in 1834, before the three-year period which had been given the Native Americans to vacate the region, and before local land surveys. Other Yankee settlers from Vermont and New York settled in what is now the northwest corner of Cook County.

The combined settlement of these pioneers, located at the intersection of Illinois Route 68 and Sutton Road, was originally called Miller Grove due to the number of families with that surname but later renamed Barrington Center because it "centered" both ways from the present Sutton Road and from Algonquin and Higgins roads. Although residents and historians agree that the name Barrington was taken from Great Barrington in Berkshire County, Massachusetts, and that many settlers immigrated to the area from Berkshire County, there is no evidence that settlers emigrated from Great Barrington itself. In addition, several original settlers, including Miller, Van Orsdal, and John W. Seymour, emigrated from Steuben County, New York, which also features a town named Barrington founded in 1822. However, it is unknown whether any settlers emigrated from Barrington, New York, itself or whether the New York settlement influenced the naming of Barrington, Illinois.

Much of the history of Barrington since its settlement parallels the development of railroad lines from the port facilities in Chicago. In 1854, the Chicago and North Western Transportation Company, later known as the Union Pacific Northwest Line, led by William Butler Ogden, extended the train line to the northwest corner of Cook County and built a station named Deer Grove.

In 1854, Robert Campbell, a civil engineer who worked for the railroad, purchased a farm 2 miles (3 km) northwest of the Deer Grove station and platted a community on the property. Deer Grove residents protested, and at Campbell's request, the railroad later moved the Deer Grove station near its modern location, which Campbell named Barrington after Barrington Center. In 1855, the village's first lumber facility began operations on Franklin Street.

By 1863, population growth during the Civil War era increased the number of Barrington residents to 300. In order to provide a tax mechanism to finance improvements, Barrington submitted its request for incorporation in 1863. Delays due to the Civil War resulted in the appropriate incorporation deeds not returning to Barrington for nearly two years. The Illinois legislature granted Barrington's charter on February 16, 1865. The Village held its first Board meeting on March 20, 1865, and appointed resident Homer Wilmarth as Mayor for one year.

In 1866, resident Milius B. McIntosh became the first elected Village President.

In 1889, the Elgin, Joliet and Eastern Railway (the "EJ&E") was built through Barrington, crossing what is now the Union Pacific Northwest Line northwest of town. In the late 19th century, a series of fires damaged numerous downtown buildings. In 1890, fire swept along the north side of East Main Street east of what became the Union Pacific Northwest Line, destroying several buildings. In 1893, another fire destroyed most of the block that became Park Avenue, and in 1898 a fire destroyed several buildings along the north side of Main Street from Hough Street to the Northwest Line railroad tracks. As a result of these fires, residents replaced the burned frame structures with more substantial brick and stone buildings, many of which remain in use (albeit with substantially altered facades).

=== 20th century ===
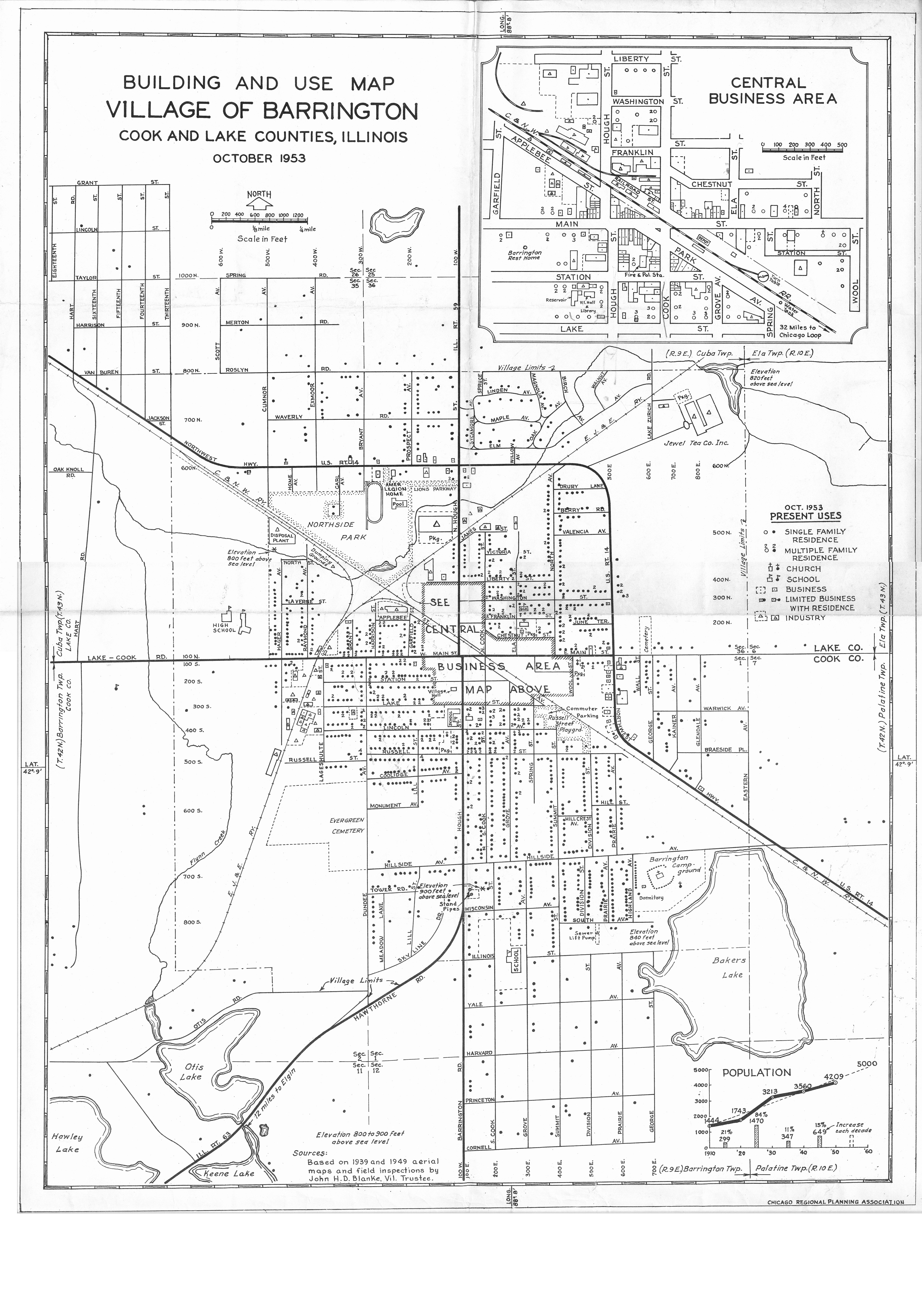
A "Building and Use Map" of the village as it existed in October 1953. This map, with dots representing individual houses, was based on 1939 and 1949 aerial maps of the area as well as field inspections by then Village Trustee John H.D. Blanke.

At the beginning of the 20th century, the village streets were unpaved, although the downtown area had wooden slat sidewalks, with some on elevated platforms. The downtown area also featured hitching posts for tethering horses as well as public outhouses. Meanwhile, fenced residential backyards in the village often contained livestock and barnyard animals.

In 1907, the village began replacing its wooden sidewalks with cement pavement. In 1929, the Jewel Tea Company built a new office, warehouse, and coffee roasting facility northeast of the village center, creating hundreds of local jobs despite the Great Depression.

The last major fire in downtown Barrington occurred on December 19, 1989. The fire completely destroyed Lipofsky's Department Store, then one of the oldest continually operating businesses in the village.

==== The Battle of Barrington ====
On November 27, 1934, a running gun battle between FBI agents and Public Enemy # 1 Baby Face Nelson took place in Barrington, resulting in the deaths of Special Agent Herman "Ed" Hollis and Inspector Samuel P. Cowley. Nelson, though shot nine times, escaped the gunfight in Hollis's car with his wife, Helen Gillis. Nelson succumbed from his wounds at approximately 8 p.m. that evening and was unceremoniously dumped near a cemetery in Niles Center (Skokie), Illinois. Infamous for allegedly killing more federal agents than any other individual, Nelson was later buried at Saint Joseph Cemetery in River Grove, Illinois. A plaque near the entrance to Langendorf Park, part of the Barrington Park District, commemorates the agents killed in the gunfight.

=== 21st century ===
In April 2009, in a non-binding referendum, residents voted in favor of permitting Barrington Township officials to begin looking into seceding from Cook County in part due to the county's increased sales tax. Barrington and its nearby villages are considered to be some of the wealthiest in the country.

In 2008, Barrington made national news for its opposition to the purchase of the Elgin, Joliet and Eastern Railway (EJ&E) by Canadian National Railway (CN), a purchase that would have increased the number of freight trains passing through the village daily. The EJ&E intersects at grade with eight major roads in the Barrington area, including Northwest Highway, Illinois State Route 59 and Lake Cook Road in downtown Barrington, as well as the Metra Union Pacific line. Then-Senator Barack Obama voiced opposition to the purchase, vowing to work with affected communities to make sure their views were considered.

On October 15, 2010, the CN railroad crossing at U.S. Route 14, as well as rail crossings at Lake Zurich Road and Cuba Road, were blocked for over one and half hours during the early afternoon rush hour due to a stopped 133-car CN southeast-bound freight train. At times during the incident, the Hough Street crossing was also blocked. The stopped train also caused back-ups on the Metra commuter rail service of their "Union Pacific Northwest Line", which operates over Union Pacific's Harvard and McHenry subdivisions. That same day, Representative Melissa Bean and Senator Dick Durbin released a statement that Barrington will receive a $2.8 million grant to fund the planning, design and engineering of a grade separation at the U.S. Route 14 and CN railroad crossing.

== Geography ==
According to the 2021 census gazetteer files, Barrington has a total area of 4.79 square miles (12.41 km^{2}), of which 4.61 square miles (11.94 km^{2}) (or 96.12%) is land and 0.19 square miles (0.49 km^{2}) (or 3.88%) is water. Barrington is approximately 30 miles (48 km) northwest of Chicago.

=== Climate ===
Barrington has a hot-summer continental climate (Köppen climate classification Dfa), with summers generally wetter than the winters:

Climate data for Barrington, Illinois (1991–2020 normals, extremes 1962–present)
Month	Jan	Feb	Mar	Apr	May	Jun	Jul	Aug	Sep	Oct	Nov	Dec	Year
Record high °F (°C)	62 (17)	69 (21)	84 (29)	89 (32)	93 (34)	102 (39)	103 (39)	100 (38)	96 (36)	88 (31)	75 (24)	67 (19)	103 (39)
Mean daily maximum °F (°C)	28.7 (−1.8)	32.8 (0.4)	44.5 (6.9)	57.5 (14.2)	68.5 (20.3)	77.5 (25.3)	81.3 (27.4)	79.2 (26.2)	72.4 (22.4)	60.1 (15.6)	46.3 (7.9)	34.2 (1.2)	56.9 (13.8)
Daily mean °F (°C)	21.1 (−6.1)	24.6 (−4.1)	35.5 (1.9)	47.3 (8.5)	58.4 (14.7)	67.8 (19.9)	72.0 (22.2)	70.2 (21.2)	63.0 (17.2)	50.8 (10.4)	38.2 (3.4)	27.0 (−2.8)	48.0 (8.9)
Mean daily minimum °F (°C)	13.4 (−10.3)	16.4 (−8.7)	26.5 (−3.1)	37.2 (2.9)	48.3 (9.1)	58.1 (14.5)	62.6 (17.0)	61.2 (16.2)	53.6 (12.0)	41.5 (5.3)	30.2 (−1.0)	19.7 (−6.8)	39.1 (3.9)
Record low °F (°C)	−28 (−33)	−26 (−32)	−9 (−23)	5 (−15)	22 (−6)	30 (−1)	38 (3)	38 (3)	25 (−4)	14 (−10)	−10 (−23)	−20 (−29)	−28 (−33)
Average precipitation inches (mm)	2.07 (53)	1.90 (48)	2.35 (60)	3.95 (100)	5.15 (131)	4.60 (117)	4.02 (102)	4.58 (116)	3.65 (93)	3.39 (86)	2.58 (66)	2.19 (56)	40.43 (1,027)
Average snowfall inches (cm)	12.6 (32)	8.5 (22)	4.6 (12)	1.1 (2.8)	0.0 (0.0)	0.0 (0.0)	0.0 (0.0)	0.0 (0.0)	0.0 (0.0)	0.1 (0.25)	2.0 (5.1)	9.6 (24)	38.5 (98)
Average precipitation days (≥ 0.01 in)	10.2	8.6	10.0	12.6	13.8	12.7	9.8	10.9	9.6	11.3	10.6	10.9	131.0
Average snowy days (≥ 0.1 in)	7.3	5.8	3.2	0.6	0.0	0.0	0.0	0.0	0.0	0.1	1.5	6.4	24.9
Source: NOAA

The highest recorded temperature was 103 °F (39 °C) on July 10, 1974; the lowest recorded temperature was −28 °F (−33 °C) on January 31, 2019. Historical tornado activity for the Barrington area is slightly below Illinois state average. On April 11, 1965, an F4 tornado approximately 9.4 miles (15.1 km) away from downtown Barrington killed 6 people and injured 75; on April 21, 1967, another F4 tornado approximately 5.1 miles (8.2 km) away from the village center killed one person, injured approximately 100 people and caused hundreds of thousands of dollars in damage.

== Demographics ==
Historical population
Census	Pop.	Note	%±
1880	410		—
1890	848		106.8%
1900	1,162		37.0%
1910	1,444		24.3%
1920	1,743		20.7%
1930	3,213		84.3%
1940	3,560		10.8%
1950	4,209		18.2%
1960	5,434		29.1%
1970	8,581		57.9%
1980	9,029		5.2%
1990	9,504		5.3%
2000	10,168		7.0%
2010	10,327		1.6%
2020	10,722		3.8%
U.S. Decennial Census

=== Racial and ethnic composition ===
Barrington village, Illinois – Racial and ethnic composition Note: the US Census treats Hispanic/Latino as an ethnic category. This table excludes Latinos from the racial categories and assigns them to a separate category. Hispanics/Latinos may be of any race.
Race / Ethnicity (NH = Non-Hispanic)	Pop 2000	Pop 2010	Pop 2020	% 2000	% 2010	% 2020
White alone (NH)	9,570	9,232	8,926	94.12%	89.40%	83.25%
Black or African American alone (NH)	63	96	117	0.62%	0.93%	1.09%
Native American or Alaska Native alone (NH)	10	14	8	0.10%	0.14%	0.07%
Asian alone (NH)	203	378	643	2.00%	3.66%	6.00%
Native Hawaiian or Pacific Islander alone (NH)	0	0	0	0.00%	0.00%	0.00%
Other race alone (NH)	11	7	12	0.11%	0.07%	0.11%
Mixed race or Multiracial (NH)	74	132	365	0.73%	1.28%	3.40%
Hispanic or Latino (any race)	237	468	651	2.33%	4.53%	6.07%
Total	10,168	10,327	10,722	100.00%	100.00%	100.00%

=== 2020 census ===
As of the 2020 census, Barrington had a population of 10,722. The population density was 2,237.01 inhabitants per square mile (863.71/km^{2}), and there were 2,902 families in the village.

The median age was 44.5 years. 24.6% of residents were under the age of 18 and 20.5% of residents were 65 years of age or older. For every 100 females there were 90.4 males, and for every 100 females age 18 and over there were 86.4 males age 18 and over.

100.0% of residents lived in urban areas, while 0.0% lived in rural areas.

There were 4,102 households in Barrington, of which 34.6% had children under the age of 18 living in them. Of all households, 58.3% were married-couple households, 12.3% were households with a male householder and no spouse or partner present, and 26.0% were households with a female householder and no spouse or partner present. About 25.3% of all households were made up of individuals and 15.2% had someone living alone who was 65 years of age or older.

There were 4,394 housing units, of which 6.6% were vacant. The homeowner vacancy rate was 3.1% and the rental vacancy rate was 6.4%.

=== Income and poverty ===
The median income for a household in the village was $112,794, and the median income for a family was $157,083. Males had a median income of $104,050 versus $61,388 for females. The per capita income for the village was $64,507. About 2.0% of families and 3.6% of the population were below the poverty line, including 0.2% of those under age 18 and 13.0% of those age 65 or over.

== Economy ==
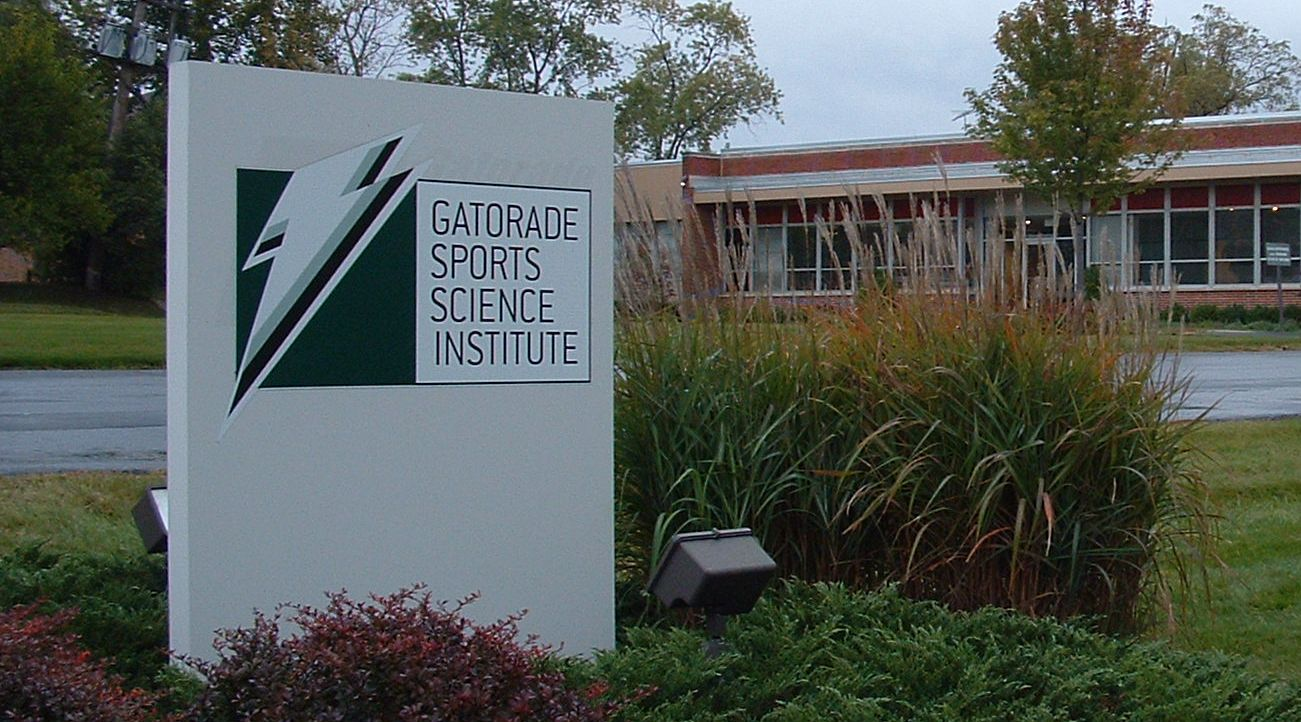
Gatorade Sports Science Institute located on West Main Street

In addition to its downtown area, the village is home to several shopping centers, including the Ice House Mall and The Foundry, located northwest of town. Barrington receives much of its sales tax revenue from its half-dozen car dealerships. State sales tax figures indicate that Barrington's auto sales, gasoline sales and state-taxable auto repairs accounted for $2.1 million in sales taxes for the village in 2008, or approximately 56 percent of its sales-tax income.

The Gatorade Sports Science Institute, often featured in the company's commercials, was formerly located in Barrington just west of downtown, across the street from Barrington High School before closing in June 2022. Barrington was also formerly home to GE Healthcare IT prior to relocating to Chicago in 2016. Other notable businesses include defense contractor ISR Systems, part of the Goodrich Corporation (formerly known as Recon Optical), and commercial real estate developer GK Development. For many years, the village was home to the Jewel Tea Company; its former headquarters was razed in the early 21st century for redevelopment as Citizens Park.

=== Top employers ===
According to Barrington's 2018 Comprehensive Annual Financial Report, the top employers in the city are:

#	Employer	# of Employees
1	Barrington Community Unit School District #220	1,200
2	Barrington Park District	379
3	Motor Werks of Barrington	355
4	The Garlands of Barrington	295
5	PepsiCo (Quaker Oats)	287
6	Barrington Transportation	230
7	Pepper Construction	226
8	Jewel Food Store	190
9	Wickstrom Ford	176
10	Heinen's	142

== Arts and culture ==
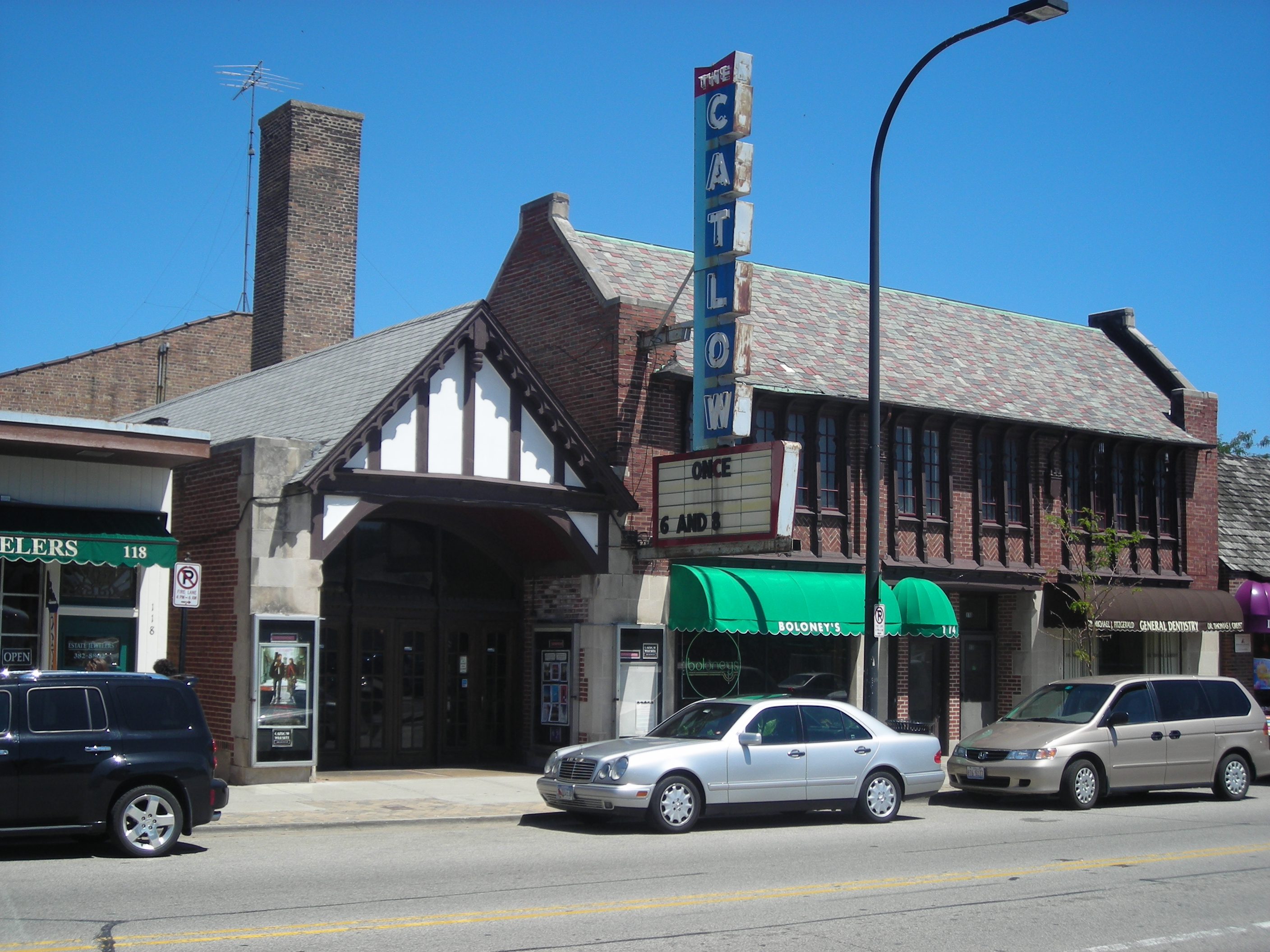
Catlow Theater

Annual celebrations and events in Barrington include the Memorial Day parade, a Fourth of July parade and evening fireworks display, and a Homecoming parade associated with Barrington High School. In addition, the village hosts the "Great Taste Fest of Barrington", a food festival exhibiting fare from local restaurants. During the fourth weekend of every September, Advocate Good Shepherd Hospital hosts "Art in the Barn", a juried fine arts show that features the exhibition and sale of fine art. Started in 1974 with only 30 artists, the event now attracts over 6,500 visitors and features live entertainment and pony rides for children in addition to the art exhibits. A fundraising event, Art in the Barn has generated more than $2.5 million for Good Shepherd Hospital. During May Barrington also hosts "KidFest Kite Fly" event which is free, fun, family event that gets the entire family outside and moving.

Barrington also hosts a variety of charity functions, including Barrington CROP Hunger Walk; Relay for Life by the American Cancer Society held at Barrington High School; and the Duck Race and Pool Party, a rubber duck race held to benefit JourneyCare (formerly Hospice and Palliative Care of Northeastern Illinois).

=== Library ===
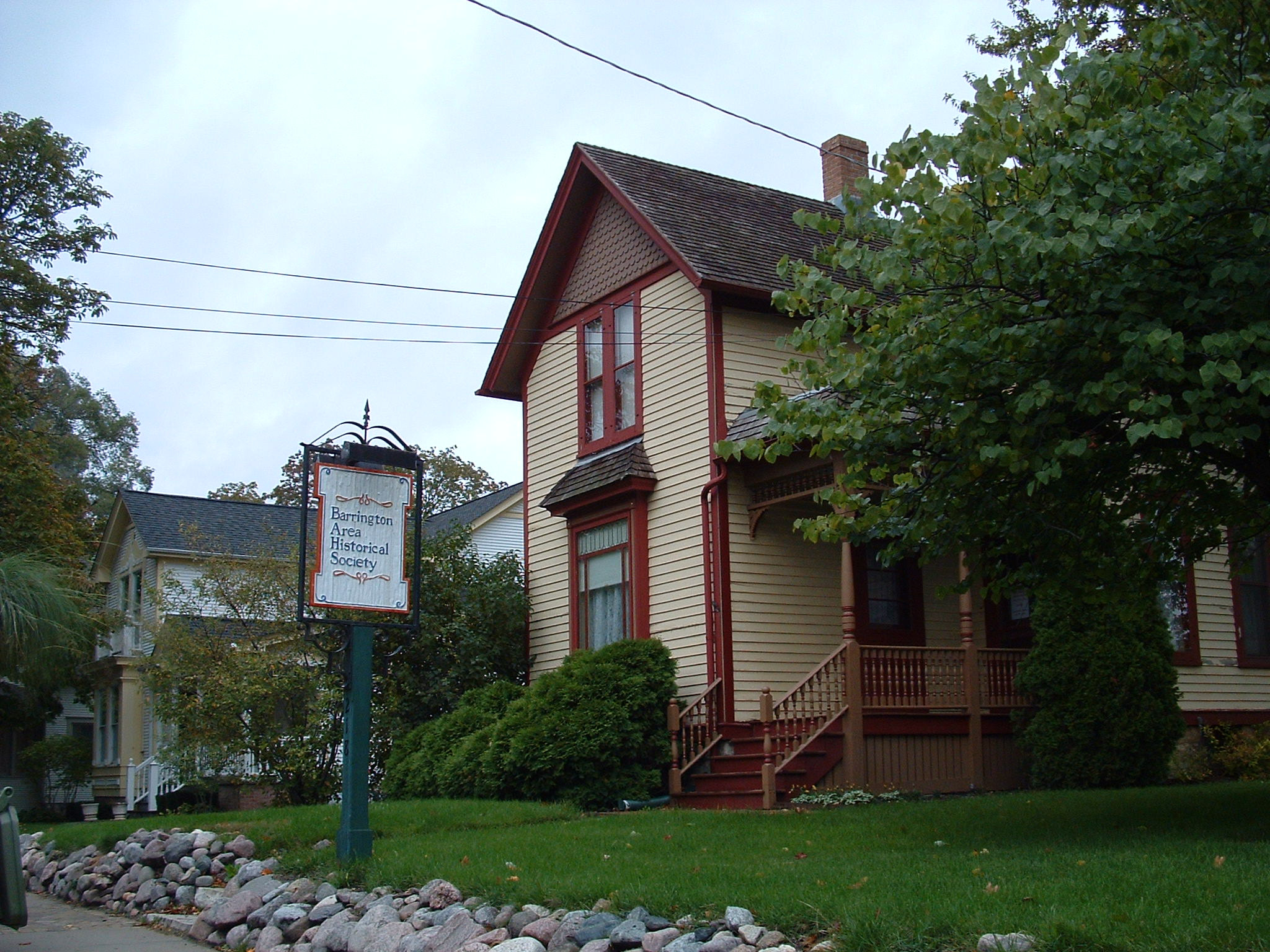
The Donlea-Kincaid House comprises part of the Barrington Area Historical Society.

The Barrington Area Library, located northeast of the village's center on Northwest Highway, contains over 226,000 book volumes and 27,000 audiovisual items. Originally established in 1915, the library moved to its current site in the mid-1970s. Through various additions, most recently in 1993, the building was expanded to its current size of approximately 60,000 square feet (5,600 m^{2}). The library currently features exhibits by local artists, including an outdoor sculpture garden.

=== Architecture ===
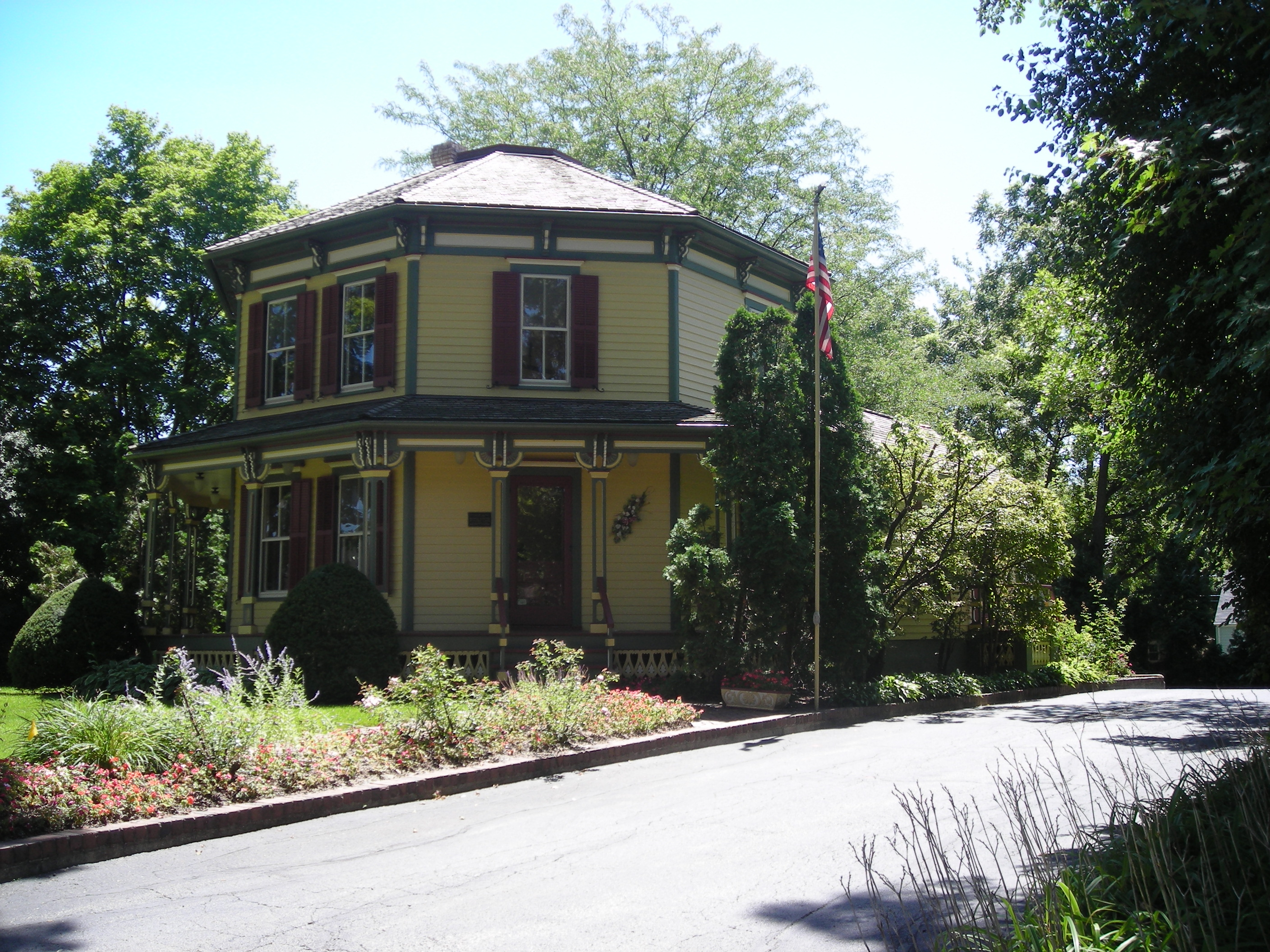
Octagon House

The Village of Barrington Historic District was established in 2001 to protect and preserve historical areas of the Village and individual structures and sites within this area which have historic, architectural or cultural significance. Barrington's Historic Preservation Overlay District is noted for its Victorian, Victorian Gothic, Queen Anne, and other popular late-19th century forms of architecture. Among Barrington's notable buildings is the Octagon House, also known as the Hawley House. Claimed to be built around 1860, although the oldest home in Barrington Village is on North Avenue dating to 1872, the Octagon House is listed on the National Register of Historic Places; although initially a residence, it now serves as a commercial property.

The downtown area is home to the historic Catlow Theater, which features interiors by noted Prairie School sculptor and designer Alfonso Iannelli and is on the National Register of Historic Places. The theater opened for business in May 1927, with Slide, Kelly, Slide as its first feature film, and continues to operate as one of the few remaining single-screen theaters in the area. The Catlow was also one of the first theaters to offer in-theater dining, provided by the adjoining restaurant (formerly Baloney's). Patrons may bring food from the restaurant into the auditorium.

Another historic building in the village, the Ice House Mall, is located just northwest of the town's center. Originally built in 1904 for the Bowman Dairy, the brick structure, with its turn of the 20th century styling, served as an actual ice house for 68 years. Renovations and additions beginning in the 1970s have transformed the original building into a collection of local specialty shops.

The Michael Bay 2010 re-make of A Nightmare on Elm Street was partially filmed in Barrington's Jewel Park subdivision (Built by the Jewel Tea Company for their executives) using a home actually on Elm Street, using the village's residential architecture as a backdrop.

== Parks and recreation ==
The Barrington area features numerous parks and nature preserves. The Arbor Day Foundation has recognized Barrington as a Tree City USA every year since 1986, in part due to the village's Tree Preservation and Management Ordinance governing the proper care for trees within the area. The Barrington Park District administers several Barrington area parks including Citizens Park, Langendorf Park (formerly North Park), Miller Park (formerly East Park), and Ron Beese Park( formerly South Park). Langendorf Park features tennis courts, playgrounds, outdoor and indoor basketball courts, baseball fields, meeting/activity rooms, and "Aqualusion", a water park that includes a zero-depth pool, lap pool, and diving area, and a splashpad. Northeast of town is Cuba Marsh Forest Preserve, a 782-acre (3.16 km^{2}) wetlands preserve featuring 3 miles (5 km) of crushed-gravel trail offering views of the adjacent marsh. The preserve is named for Cuba Road, which provides the park's northern boundary. It is administered by Lake County Forest Preserves. In 2011, Barrington received a $65,000 grant from the Northwest Municipal Conference for preliminary engineering of a bike path along Northwest Highway. However, a timetable for the project has not yet been set.

There are two golf courses within village limits including the Makray Memorial Golf Club. (formerly known as the Thunderbird Golf Course) Located southeast of the village center on Northwest Highway, the 18-hole course totals 7,000 yards (6,400 m) and includes four sets of tees per hole. The other golf course is a five-hole public course operated by the Barrington Park District at the far western end of Langendorf Park.

== Government ==
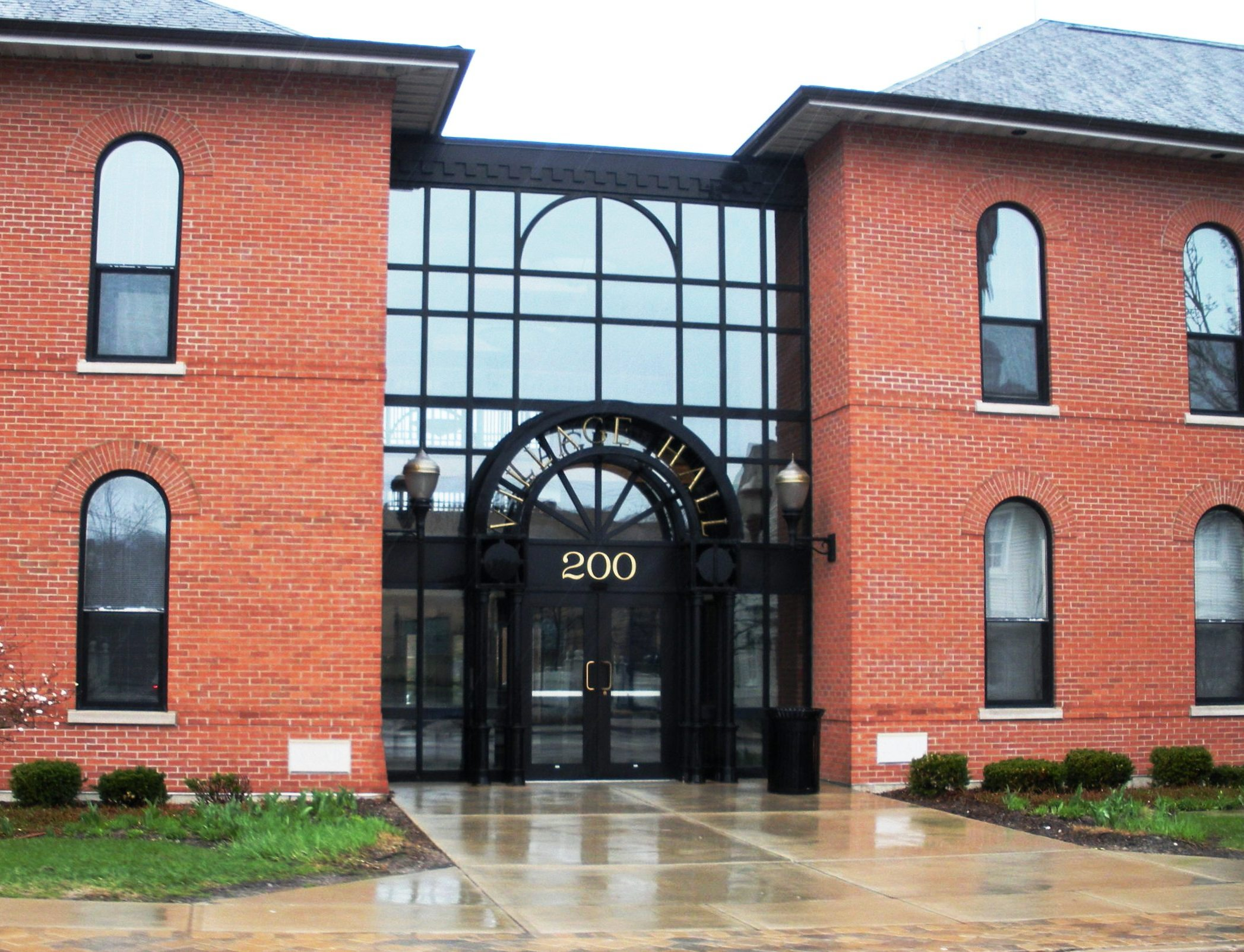
Barrington village hall, located on South Hough Street (Illinois Route 59) in downtown Barrington. Cornerstones on either side of the entrance commemorate the year the building was originally constructed, 1898, and the year it was nearly completely rebuilt, 2000.

The Village of Barrington is a home rule municipality which functions under the council-manager form of government with a village President and a six-member board of trustees, all of whom are elected at large to staggered four-year terms. The current Village President is Karen Darch. There are six current members of the Board of Trustees in addition to a village treasurer. The village clerk, also an elected position, is responsible for taking and transcribing minutes of all Village Board and Committee of the Whole meetings along with other municipal clerk duties. The current village clerk is Adam Frazier.

=== Relationship with Cook County ===
In April 2009, in a non-binding referendum, village residents voted in favor of permitting Barrington township officials to begin looking into seceding from Cook County. The referendum, entitled "Barrington Twp – Disconnect from Cook County," asked, "Should Barrington Township consider disconnection from Cook County, Illinois, and forming a new county if a viable option exists for doing so?" The referendum came in response to Cook County's increased sales tax, now the highest in the country, and increased tensions between the county and towns neighboring Lake County. Hanover and Palatine townships, as well as the Village of Tinley Park, (already partially located in Will County,) also passed similar measures.

== Education ==
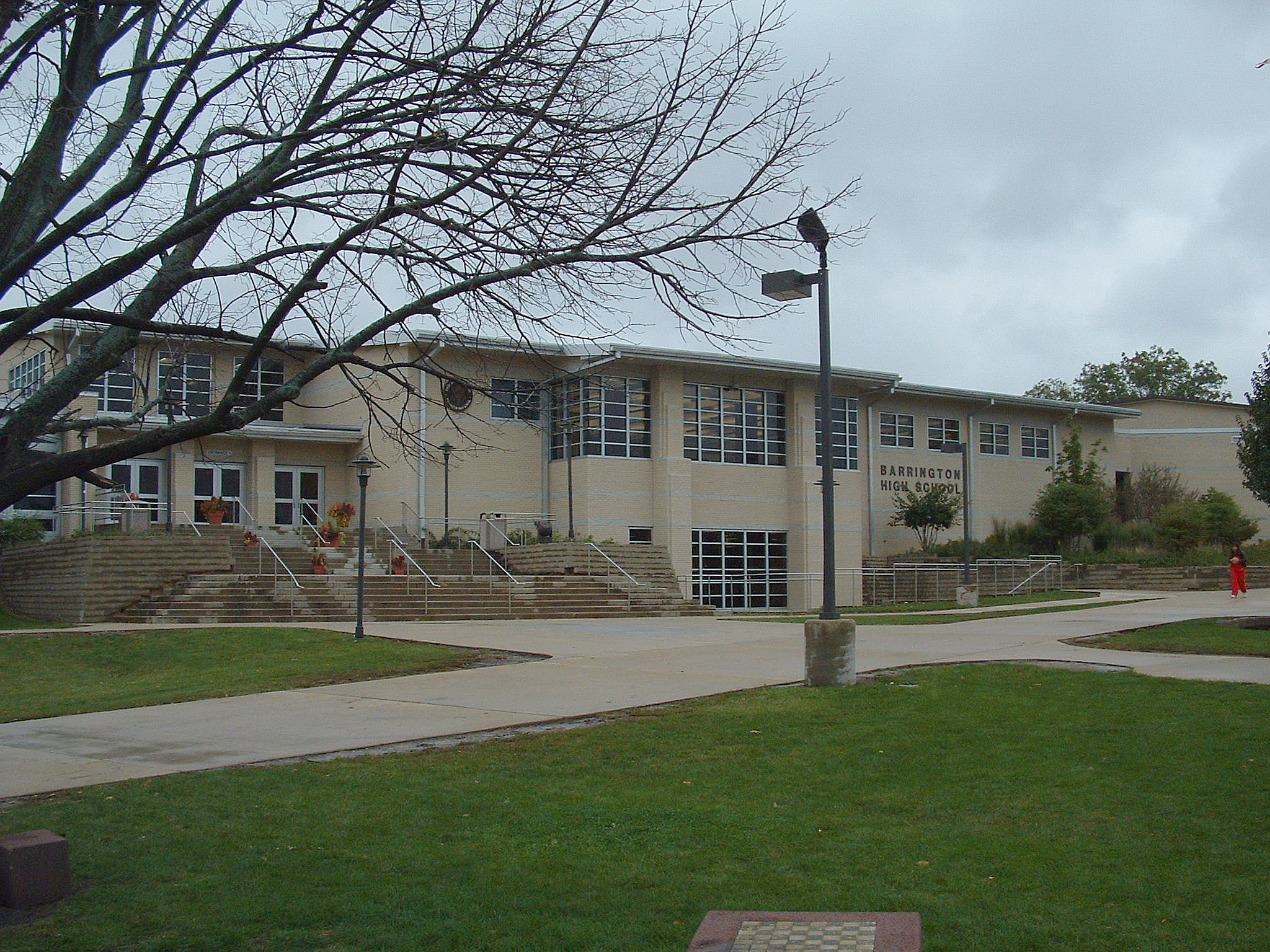
Barrington High School

Barrington serves as the geographic center for the 72-square-mile (190 km^{2}) Barrington Community Unit School District 220. Schools located in Barrington include:

- Barrington High School
- Barrington Middle School - Prairie Campus
- Barrington Middle School - Station Campus
- Arnett C. Lines Elementary School
- Countryside Elementary School
- Grove Avenue Elementary School
- Hough Street Elementary School (2015 Blue Ribbon school)
- Roslyn Road Elementary School

St. Anne Catholic Community is a K-8 Catholic school.

== Media ==
The Barrington Courier-Review is a local newspaper.

Barrington is included in the Chicago market and receives its media from Chicago network affiliates. The Chicago Tribune and Chicago Sun-Times also cover area news. The village's Community Relations board broadcasts all Village Board meetings, as well as community announcements, on a local government-access television (GATV) cable TV station.

== Infrastructure ==
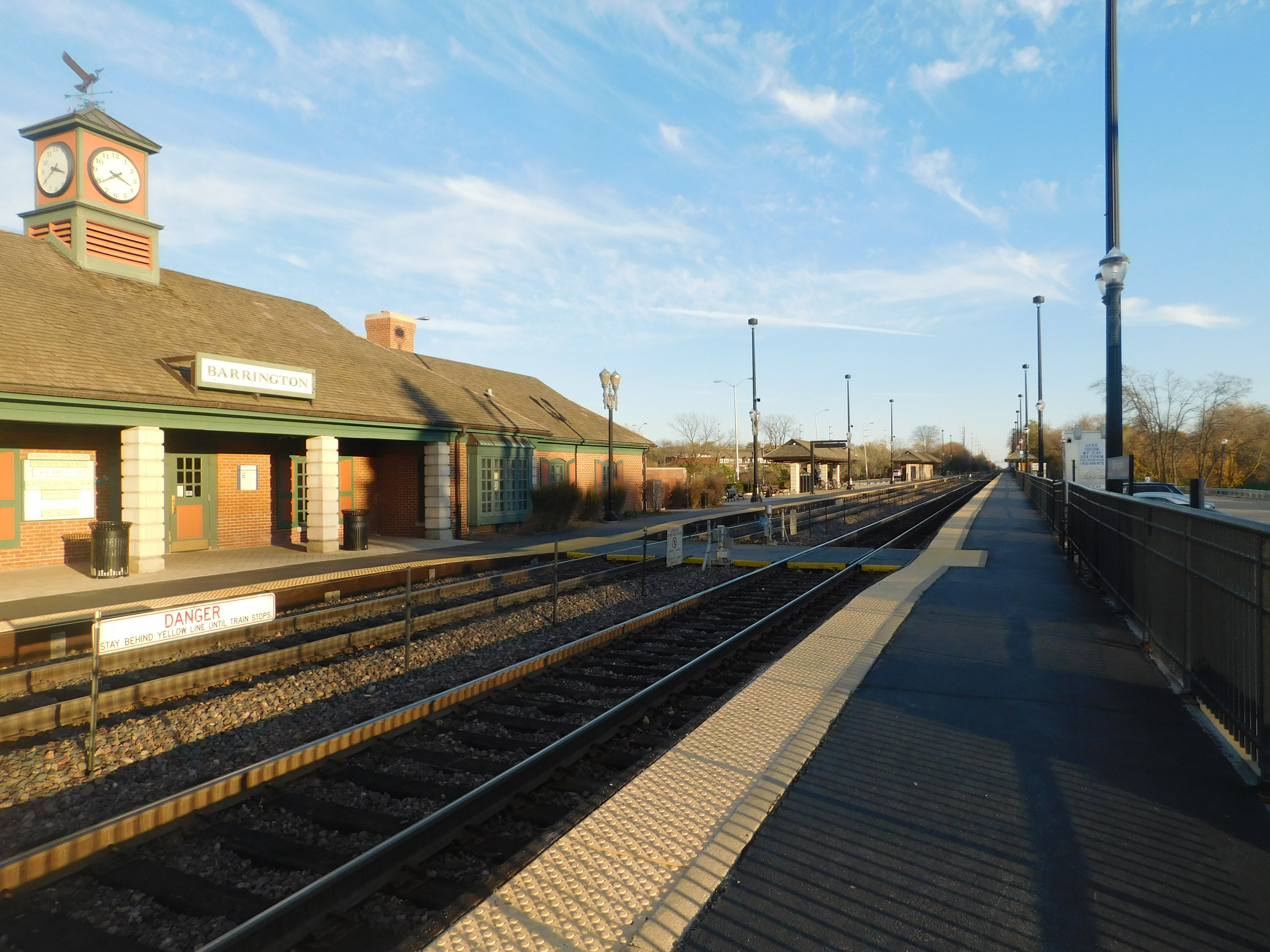
Barrington station is on Metra's Union Pacific Northwest Line train line.

=== Transportation ===
Metra provides commuter rail service on the Union Pacific Northwest Line connecting Barrington station southeast to Ogilvie Transportation Center in Chicago and northwest to Harvard or McHenry. Highways:

- US 14 (Northwest Highway)
- IL 59 (Hough Street)
- IL 68 (Dundee Road)

=== Medical and emergency ===
In 1927, residents established a "Barrington General Hospital" in a local house. The hospital closed in 1935. Various resident petitions and fundraising during the 1960s and 1970s renewed interest in a local hospital, and Good Shepherd Hospital opened in 1979 north of Barrington.

In 2009, the Barrington Police Department had 23 full-time police officers; and in 2007, the Barrington Fire Department had 38 full-time firefighters. The Village has an emergency operations plan as well as a community notification system called Connect-CTY.

== See also ==
- The Battle of Barrington
- Barrington High School
- Catlow Theater
- Citizens for Conservation
- Elgin, Joliet and Eastern Railway
- Health World Inc.
- Jewel Tea Co.
- Lake Cook Road
- Octagon House
- Union Pacific Northwest Line
- St. Anne Catholic Community
