= Illinois's 9th congressional district =

U.S. House district for Illinois

Coordinates: 42°03′10″N 87°48′37″W

- Interactive map of district boundaries since January 3, 2023
- Representative: Jan Schakowsky; D–Evanston
- Area: 172.3 mi^{2} (446 km^{2})
- Distribution: 100.0% urban; 0.0% rural
- Population (2025): 770,613
- Median household income: $97,521
- Ethnicity: 59.2% White; 14.9% Asian; 13.0% Hispanic; 8.6% Black; 3.6% Two or more races; 0.7% other
- Cook PVI: D+19

The 9th congressional district of Illinois covers parts of Cook, Lake, and McHenry counties as of the 2021 redistricting which followed the 2020 United States census. It includes all or parts of Chicago, Evanston, Glenview, Skokie, Morton Grove, Niles, Northfield, Prospect Heights, Wilmette, Buffalo Grove, Hawthorn Woods, Wauconda, Island Lake, Long Grove, Lake Barrington, Algonquin Township, Cary, Crystal Lake, Lake in the Hills, Lakewood, Oakwood Hills, Trout Valley, Algonquin, Port Barrington, Barrington Hills, and Fox River Grove. It is anchored in Chicago's North Side, along Lake Michigan, and covers many of Chicago's northern suburbs. Democrat Jan Schakowsky has represented the district since January 1999. Schakowsky has announced that she would not seek reelection in 2026.

The district is one of the most reliably Democratic of all congressional districts in Chicago, and in all of Illinois: It has been in Democratic hands without interruption since 1949.

== Cities and towns ==
For the 118th and successive Congresses (based on redistricting following the 2020 census), the district contains all or portions of the following counties, townships, and municipalities:

Cook County (24)

Arlington Heights (part, also 5th and 8th), Buffalo Grove (part, also 10th; shared with Lake County), Chicago (part, also 1st, 2nd, 3rd, 4th, 5th, 6th, 7th, and 8th; shared with DuPage County), Des Plaines (part, also 3rd, 5th, and 8th), Evanston, Glencoe (part, also 5th and 10th), Glenview (part, also 10th), Golf, Lincolnwood, Maine Township (part, also 5th and 8th), Morton Grove, Mount Prospect (part, also 5th), New Trier Township (part, also 10th), Niles (part, also 5th), Niles Township (part, also 5th), Northbrook (part, also 5th), Northfield, Northfield Township (part, also 10th), Park Ridge (part, also 5th), Prospect Heights (part, also 10th), Skokie (part, also 5th), Wheeling (part, also 10th), Wheeling Township (part, also 5th and 10th), Wilmette (part, also 10th)

Lake County (16)

Buffalo Grove (part, also 10th; shared with Cook County), Cuba Township (part, also 5th), Ela Township (part, also 5th), Fremont Township (part, also 10th), Hawthorn Woods (part, also 10th), Island Lake (part, also 11th; shared with McHenry County), Kildeer (part, also 5th), Lake Barrington (part, also 5th), Lake Zurich (part, also 5th), Long Grove (part, also 5th), North Barrington (part, also 5th), Port Barrington (part, also 11th; shared with McHenry County), Tower Lakes, Vernon Township (part, also 5th and 10th), Wauconda (part, also 11th), Wauconda Township (part, also 11th)

McHenry County (10)

Algonquin (part, also 8th; shared with Kane County), Algonquin Township, Barrington Hills (part, also 5th; shared with Cook County), Cary, Crystal Lake (part, also 11th), Fox River Grove, Lake in the Hills (part, also 11th), Lakewood (part, also 11th), Port Barrington (part, also 11th; shared with Lake County), Trout Valley

Chicago neighborhoods in the 9th district include:

- Edgewater
- Lincoln Park (part)
- Rogers Park
- Uptown (part)
- West Ridge

== Redistricting history ==
As of the 2020 redistricting, this district will still be based largely in Chicago's Far North Side and northern Cook County, as well as now parts of southwest Lake County and southeast McHenry County.

The 9th district takes in the Chicago neighborhoods of Rogers Park, Edgewater, and West Ridge; most of Uptown; and part of Lincoln Square.

Outside of the Chicago city limits, the district takes in the Cook County communities of Evanston, Glenview, Skokie, Morton Grove, Niles, Lincolnwood, and Golf; most of Northfield and Prospect Heights; northeastern Park Ridge and Arlington Heights; western Northfield and Buffalo Grove (shared with Lake County); southeastern Northbrook; northern Mount Prospect; half of Wilmette south of Lake Ave; most of Prospect Heights; and part of Glencoe, Des Plaines, and Wheeling (shared with Lake County).

Lake County is split between this district, the 5th district, the 10th district, and the 11th district. The 9th and 5th districts are partitioned by partitioned by the Fox River, Kelsey Rd, W Miller Rd, Echo Lake Rd, Sacomano Meadows Pond 1, Midlothian Rd, N Old Henry Rd, N Quentin Rd, Lake Zurich Rd, Twin Orchard Country Club, Mundelein Rd, Hicks Rd, Bridgewater Farm, Crossing Pond Park, and Arlington Heights Rd.

The 9th, 10th, and 11th districts are partitioned by Buffalo Grove Golf Course, Buffalo Grove Rd, Arboretum Golf Club, W Half Day Rd, Promontory Ridge Trail, Port Clinton Rd, Mundelein Rd, Highland Pines Park, Diamond Lake Rd, Breckinridge Dr, N Midlothian Rd, Illinois Route 60, W Hawley St, N Chevy Chase Rd, Steeple Chase Golf Club, W Lakeview Parkway, N Gilmer Rd, Hawley St, W Ivanhoe Rd, Liberty St, High St, Kimball Ave, E Liberty St, S Church St, Bangs St, W Liberty St, Westridge Dr/N Lakeview Cir, Carriage Hill Ct/Wood Creek Dr, Greenleaf Ave, Ridge Rd/Burr Oak Ln, and E Burnett Rd/Northern Ter. The 9th district takes in the communities of Forest Lake and Tower Lakes; most of Hawthorn Woods; western Buffalo Grove (shared with Cook County); and part of Wauconda, Island Lake, Long Grove, Lake Barrington, Kildeer, Lake Zurich, North Barrington, Port Barrington (shared with McHenry County), and Fox River Grove (shared with McHenry County).

McHenry County is split between this district and the 11th district. They are partitioned by E Crystal Lake Ave, Meridian Ln, Crystal Lake Country Club, Woodscreek Park, Boulder Ridge Country Club, and Fairway View Dr. The 9th district takes in the entirety of Algonquin Township, which includes the communities of Cary and Trout Valley; most of Lake in the Hills and Crystal Lake; north Algonquin; and part of Port Barrington (shared with Lake County), Barrington Hills, Fox River Grove (shared with Lake County), and Lakewood.

== Recent election results from statewide races ==
Year	Office	Results
2008	President	Obama 69% - 30%
2012	President	Obama 66% - 34%
2016	President	Clinton 68% - 26%
2016	Senate	Duckworth 63% - 32%
2016	Comptroller (Spec.)	Mendoza 56% - 37%
2018	Governor	Pritzker 66% - 31%
2018	Attorney General	Raoul 67% - 31%
2018	Secretary of State	White 78% - 20%
2018	Comptroller	Mendoza 71% - 26%
2018	Treasurer	Frerichs 69% - 28%
2020	President	Biden 70% - 28%
2020	Senate	Durbin 67% - 28%
2022	Senate	Duckworth 72% - 27%
2022	Governor	Pritzker 72% - 26%
2022	Attorney General	Raoul 70% - 28%
2022	Secretary of State	Giannoulias 70% - 28%
2022	Comptroller	Mendoza 72% - 27%
2022	Treasurer	Frerichs 70% - 29%
2024	President	Harris 67% - 31%

== List of members representing the district ==
Member	Party	Years	Cong.	Electoral history	District boundaries
District created March 4, 1853
Willis Allen (Marion)	Democratic	March 4, 1853 – March 3, 1855	33rd	Redistricted from the 2nd district and re-elected in 1852. [data missing]	
Samuel S. Marshall (McLeansboro)	Democratic	March 4, 1855 – March 3, 1859	34th 35th	Elected in 1854. Re-elected in 1856. [data missing]	
John A. Logan (Benton)	Democratic	March 4, 1859 – April 2, 1862	36th 37th	Elected in 1858; Re-elected in 1860. Resigned to join the Union Army.	
Vacant		April 2, 1862 – June 2, 1862	37th		
William J. Allen (Marion)	Democratic	June 2, 1862 – March 3, 1863	37th	Elected to finish Logan's term. Redistricted to the 13th district.	
Lewis Winans Ross (Lewiston)	Democratic	March 4, 1863 – March 3, 1869	38th 39th 40th	Elected in 1862. Re-elected in 1864. Re-elected in 1866. [data missing]	
Thompson W. McNeely (Petersburg)	Democratic	March 4, 1869 – March 3, 1873	41st 42nd	Elected in 1868. Re-elected in 1870. [data missing]	
Granville Barrere (Canton)	Republican	March 4, 1873 – March 3, 1875	43rd	Elected in 1872. [data missing]	
Richard H. Whiting (Peoria)	Republican	March 4, 1875 – March 3, 1877	44th	Elected in 1874. [data missing]	
Thomas A. Boyd (Lewiston)	Republican	March 4, 1877 – March 3, 1881	45th 46th	Elected in 1876. Re-elected in 1878. [data missing]	
John H. Lewis (Knoxville)	Republican	March 4, 1881 – March 3, 1883	47th	Elected in 1880. [data missing]	
Lewis E. Payson (Pontiac)	Republican	March 4, 1883 – March 3, 1891	48th 49th 50th 51st	Redistricted from the 8th district and re-elected in 1882. Re-elected in 1884. Re-elected in 1886. Re-elected in 1888. [data missing]	
Herman W. Snow (Sheldon)	Democratic	March 4, 1891 – March 3, 1893	52nd	Elected in 1890. [data missing]	
Hamilton K. Wheeler (Kankakee)	Republican	March 4, 1893 – March 3, 1895	53rd	Elected in 1892. [data missing]	
Robert R. Hitt (Mount Morris)	Republican	March 4, 1895 – March 3, 1903	54th 55th 56th 57th	Redistricted from the 6th district and re-elected in 1894. Re-elected in 1896. Re-elected in 1898. Re-elected in 1900. Redistricted to the 13th district.	
Henry S. Boutell (Chicago)	Republican	March 4, 1903 – March 3, 1911	58th 59th 60th 61st	Redistricted from the 6th district and re-elected in 1902. Re-elected in 1904. Re-elected in 1906. Re-elected in 1908. [data missing]	
Lynden Evans (Chicago)	Democratic	March 4, 1911 – March 3, 1913	62nd	Elected in 1910. [data missing]	
Frederick A. Britten (Chicago)	Republican	March 4, 1913 – January 3, 1935	63rd 64th 65th 66th 67th 68th 69th 70th 71st 72nd 73rd	Elected in 1912. Re-elected in 1914. Re-elected in 1916. Re-elected in 1918. Re-elected in 1920. Re-elected in 1922. Re-elected in 1924. Re-elected in 1926. Re-elected in 1928. Re-elected in 1930. Re-elected in 1932. Lost re-election.	
James McAndrews (Chicago)	Democratic	January 3, 1935 – January 3, 1941	74th 75th 76th	Elected in 1934. Re-elected in 1936. Re-elected in 1938. Lost re-election.	
Charles S. Dewey (Chicago)	Republican	January 3, 1941 – January 3, 1945	77th 78th	Elected in 1940. Re-elected in 1942. Lost re-election.	
Alexander J. Resa (Chicago)	Democratic	January 3, 1945 – January 3, 1947	79th	Elected in 1944. Lost re-election.	
Robert Twyman (Chicago)	Republican	January 3, 1947 – January 3, 1949	80th	Elected in 1946. Retired.	
Sidney R. Yates (Chicago)	Democratic	January 3, 1949 – January 3, 1963	81st 82nd 83rd 84th 85th 86th 87th	Elected in 1948. Re-elected in 1950. Re-elected in 1952. Re-elected in 1954. Re-elected in 1956. Re-elected in 1958. Re-elected in 1960. Retired to run for U.S. Senator.	
Edward R. Finnegan (Chicago)	Democratic	January 3, 1963 – December 6, 1964	88th	Redistricted from the 12th district and re-elected in 1962. Resigned when appointed Judge of the Circuit Court of Cook County, IL.	
Vacant		December 6, 1964 – January 3, 1965	88th		
Sidney R. Yates (Chicago)	Democratic	January 3, 1965 – January 3, 1999	89th 90th 91st 92nd 93rd 94th 95th 96th 97th 98th 99th 100th 101st 102nd 103rd 104th 105th	Elected in 1964. Re-elected in 1966. Re-elected in 1968. Re-elected in 1970. Re-elected in 1972. Re-elected in 1974. Re-elected in 1976. Re-elected in 1978. Re-elected in 1980. Re-elected in 1982. Re-elected in 1984. Re-elected in 1986. Re-elected in 1988. Re-elected in 1990. Re-elected in 1992. Re-elected in 1994. Re-elected in 1996. Retired.	
Jan Schakowsky (Evanston)	Democratic	January 3, 1999 – present	106th 107th 108th 109th 110th 111th 112th 113th 114th 115th 116th 117th 118th 119th	Elected in 1998. Re-elected in 2000. Re-elected in 2002. Re-elected in 2004. Re-elected in 2006. Re-elected in 2008. Re-elected in 2010. Re-elected in 2012. Re-elected in 2014. Re-elected in 2016. Re-elected in 2018. Re-elected in 2020. Re-elected in 2022. Re-elected in 2024. Retiring at the end of term.	2003–2013
Jan Schakowsky (Evanston)	Democratic	January 3, 1999 – present	106th 107th 108th 109th 110th 111th 112th 113th 114th 115th 116th 117th 118th 119th	Elected in 1998. Re-elected in 2000. Re-elected in 2002. Re-elected in 2004. Re-elected in 2006. Re-elected in 2008. Re-elected in 2010. Re-elected in 2012. Re-elected in 2014. Re-elected in 2016. Re-elected in 2018. Re-elected in 2020. Re-elected in 2022. Re-elected in 2024. Retiring at the end of term.	2013–2023
Jan Schakowsky (Evanston)	Democratic	January 3, 1999 – present	106th 107th 108th 109th 110th 111th 112th 113th 114th 115th 116th 117th 118th 119th	Elected in 1998. Re-elected in 2000. Re-elected in 2002. Re-elected in 2004. Re-elected in 2006. Re-elected in 2008. Re-elected in 2010. Re-elected in 2012. Re-elected in 2014. Re-elected in 2016. Re-elected in 2018. Re-elected in 2020. Re-elected in 2022. Re-elected in 2024. Retiring at the end of term.	2023–present
Daniel Biss (Evanston)	Democratic	Assuming office on January 3, 2027		Elected in 2026.	2023–present

== Recent election results ==
=== 2012 ===
Illinois's 9th congressional district, 2012
Party	Candidate	Votes	%
Democratic	Jan Schakowsky (incumbent)	194,869	66.3
Republican	Timothy Wolfe	98,924	33.7
Independent	Hilaire Fuji Shioura (write-in)	8	0.0
Independent	Susanne Atanus (write-in)	6	0.0
Total votes		293,807	100.0
Democratic hold			

=== 2014 ===
Illinois's 9th congressional district, 2014
Party	Candidate	Votes	%
Democratic	Jan Schakowsky (incumbent)	141,000	66.1
Republican	Susanne Atanus	72,384	33.9
Independent	Phil Collins (write-in)	66	0.0
Total votes		213,450	100.0
Democratic hold			

=== 2016 ===
Illinois's 9th congressional district, 2016
Party	Candidate	Votes	%
Democratic	Jan Schakowsky (incumbent)	217,306	66.5
Republican	Joan McCarthy Lasonde	109,550	33.5
Independent	David Earl Williams III (write-in)	79	0.0
Independent	Susanne Atanus (write-in)	13	0.0
Total votes		326,948	100.0
Democratic hold			

=== 2018 ===
Illinois's 9th congressional district, 2018
Party	Candidate	Votes	%
Democratic	Jan Schakowsky (incumbent)	213,368	73.5
Republican	John Elleson	76,983	26.5
Total votes		290,351	100.0
Democratic hold			

=== 2020 ===
Illinois's 9th congressional district, 2020
Party	Candidate	Votes	%	±%
Democratic	Jan Schakowsky (incumbent)	262,045	70.98	−2.51%
Republican	Sargis Sangari	107,125	29.02	+2.51%
Total votes		369,170	100.0	
Democratic hold				

=== 2022 ===
Illinois's 9th congressional district, 2022
Party	Candidate	Votes	%
Democratic	Jan Schakowsky (incumbent)	179,615	71.69
Republican	Max Rice	70,915	28.31
Total votes		250,530	100.0
Democratic hold			

=== 2024 ===
Illinois's 9th congressional district, 2024
Party	Candidate	Votes	%	±%
Democratic	Jan Schakowsky (incumbent)	231,722	68.39	−3.30%
Republican	Seth Cohen	107,106	31.61	+3.30%
Total votes		338,828	100.0	
Democratic hold				

== See also ==
- Illinois's congressional districts
- List of United States congressional districts
- 2026 United States House of Representatives elections in Illinois#District 9
