= Daniel M. Pierce =

American lawyer (1928–2020)

Daniel Pierce

Mayor of Highland Park, Illinois
- In office 1999–2003
- Preceded by: Raymond Geraci
- Succeeded by: Michael Belsky
- In office 1987 – April 24, 1995
- Preceded by: Robert Buhai
- Succeeded by: Raymond Geraci

Member of the Illinois House of Representatives
- In office 1965–1985
- Preceded by: At-large district created
- Succeeded by: Grace Mary Stern
- Constituency: 58th district (1983–85); 32nd district (1967–83); At-large district (1965–67)

Personal details
- Born: Daniel Marshall Pierce; March 31, 1928 Chicago, Illinois
- Died: February 13, 2020 (aged 91) Highland Park, Illinois
- Party: Democratic
- Spouse: Rhoda
- Education: Harvard College (B.A.); Harvard Law School (J.D.)
- Profession: Attorney

Military service
- Allegiance: United States
- Branch/service: United States Air Force
- Unit: Judge Advocate General's Corps

Daniel Marshall Pierce (March 31, 1928 – February 13, 2020) was an American lawyer and politician from Illinois. He served as a Democratic member of the Illinois House of Representatives, as Mayor of Highland Park, Illinois, and as a trustee on the North Shore Water Reclamation District.

== Early life ==
Pierce was born March 31, 1928, in Chicago. His family moved to the North Shore where he graduated from New Trier High School. He earned degrees from Harvard College and Harvard Law School. He served in the United States Air Force Judge Advocate General's Corps during the Korean War. While in the Air Force, he attended the United States Air Force Command & Staff School. He then took a position with Altheimer, Gray, Naiburg, Strasburger & Lawton where he would remain for the remainder of his legal career.

== Illinois House of Representatives ==
In an unusual election, Pierce ran on a statewide ballot after the Illinois Supreme Court ordered an at large election for all 177 members of the Illinois House; the result of partisan gridlock preventing the completion of the decennial reapportionment process.

After a 1965 Illinois Supreme Court Case to resolve the redistricting issue, Pierce's Highland Park home was drawn into the 32nd district which consisted of Algonquin, Dorr, Grafton, and Nunda townships in McHenry County and Cuba, Deerfield, Ela, Fremont, Libertyville, Shields, Vernon, Wauconda and West Deerfield townships in Lake County. He was reelected as one of the district's three representatives.

During his tenure, he was a member of the Democratic Study Group, a caucus of independent, liberal Democrats. His role in this organization earned him a nominal spot on the leadership team of then-Minority Leader Clyde L. Choate. Pierce served as a delegate for Edmund Muskie in the 1972 Democratic presidential primary. He was in favor of the Equal Rights Amendment. He served as Chairman of the House Revenue Committee, the Mental Health Investigating Committee, the Energy and Environment Committee, the Illinois Economic Fiscal Commission, and the Energy Resources Commission He served on the House Public Utilities Committee and as House Minority Whip for two terms.

Pierce explored running for the Democratic nomination for Illinois Attorney General in the 1982 primary, but stepped aside after failing to be slated by the Cook County Democratic Party in favor of Neil Hartigan. Hartigan would go on to beat incumbent Tyrone C. Fahner. In 1983, rather than run for an eleventh term, Pierce chose to retire. He was succeeded by fellow Democrat and former Lake County Clerk Grace Mary Stern.

== Mayor of Highland Park ==
In 1987, Pierce defeated Alderman Calvin Tobin to become the Mayor of Highland Park in 1987, to succeed incumbent Robert Buhai who finished third of three candidates in the primary.

He was reelected in 1991. In 1995, he was defeated for a third term by Trustee Raymond Geraci. He defeated Geraci in the 1999 election and served a final term from 1999 to 2003.

== Other political activities ==
Pierce was later the President of the North Shore Water Reclamation District, a position he served in for over a decade. Pierce was also a member of the Central Committee for the Democratic Party of Illinois from Illinois's 10th congressional district. He served on the central committee at various times starting no later than the 1960s, when he was the central committeeman from what was then Illinois's 12th congressional district.

== Death ==
Pierce died on February 13, 2020.
