= Barrington Area Library =

Library in Barrington, Illinois

- 42.159300°N 88.127716°W
- Location: 505 North Northwest Highway, Barrington, Illinois, United States
- Type: Public library
- Established: 1914

Collection
- Size: 213,871

Access and use
- Circulation: 1,186,681
- Population served: 45,360
- Members: 26,072

Other information
- Director: Jason Pinshower
- Website: balibrary.org

The Barrington Area Library, located at 505 N. Northwest Highway in Barrington, Illinois, serves the approximately 45,360 residents of the Barrington Public Library District. One of the largest geographic public library districts in Illinois, the Barrington Public Library District covers a 72-square-mile (190 km^{2}) area in Cook, Lake, Kane, and McHenry counties, and encompasses all or part of the communities of Barrington, Barrington Hills, Deer Park, Lake Barrington, North Barrington, South Barrington, Tower Lakes, Algonquin, Fox River Grove, Hoffman Estates, Inverness, Kildeer, Lake Zurich, Palatine, Port Barrington, and some unincorporated areas.

Located in the center of the library district, the 60,000-square-foot (5,600 m^{2}) library building houses a collection of 330,000 books, audiobooks, CDs, DVDs, audio and video downloads, and other items. The library's park-like campus includes a sculpture garden, and a series of gardens designed to spotlight native plants. Wi-Fi service is available throughout the building and grounds. Advanced self-check out and return systems are used, along with a MakerLab offering 3D printing, laser cutting, and sublimation printing, and a digital studio.

The library presents cultural events, live music, book discussions for all ages, computer and technology classes, craft and wellness workshops, and a wide variety of children's programming in the library's meeting rooms, which are also used for meetings by over 300 nonprofit community organizations. Annual circulation is approximately 1,186,681, and more than 415,242 people visit the library each year.

== History ==
The Barrington Area Library started in 1914 with a $1,000 bequest from Caroline Ela. When voters declined to create a tax-supported library, the Barrington Woman's Club established a library in a local drug store with donated books and a volunteer staff. After its 1915 opening, the library made several moves to larger quarters until 1924, when the Barrington Village Board offered space in Village Hall. In 1925, Barrington residents approved a library tax and the Woman's Club turned the library over to the village.

The library remained in the Village Hall until 1957 when a new library designed by architect Ralph Stoetzel was constructed at Monument and Hough Streets. This colonial-style building now serves as the offices for Barrington Township. Jennie Lines was hired as the first full-time librarian in 1926. In the coming years, interest grew in forming a library district to serve the surrounding communities. In 1969 and 1970, referendums were passed which made the village library a district library serving the communities the district includes today.

The library's current site was donated by the Jewel and Kendall Companies in 1972. A 1975 bond issue funded a new building designed by Coder Taylor Associates, which opened in 1978. In 1989, the architectural firm of Ross Barney + Jankowski was hired to design an addition to the library, which was completed in 1993. 20 years after the first addition, the architectural firm Engberg Anderson, Inc was hired to completely renovate the building and design a small addition, which was completed in 2014. The new Youth Services department opened in January 2014, and features an interactive children's play area with a stage, play costumes, puppet theater, and slide, a giant Light Bright Wall, interactive video Word Wall and Digital Pond, a Pretend Marketplace, Imagination Playground and much more. The library's renovation features enhanced meeting rooms, a Smart Room meeting room, a large Business and Technology Center with computer lab, MakerLab, Digital Studio, conference room, media:scapes, business pods and more.

== Awards ==
- American Library Association John Cotton Dana Library Public Relations Award, 2004
- North Suburban Library System Library of the Year Award, 1994–1995
