= Wauconda Community Unit School District 118 =

School district in Wauconda, Illinois

Location
- Wauconda, Illinois United States
- Coordinates: 42°16′03″N 88°08′48″W

District information
- Type: Public
- Grades: PreK–12
- Superintendent: Dr. David Wilm
- Schools: 6
- Budget: $95,913,000
- NCES District ID: 1741190

Students and staff
- Students: 4,367
- Teachers: 398.90 (on FTE basis)
- Student–teacher ratio: 10.95:1

Other information
- Website: www.d118.org

Wauconda Community Unit School District 118 is an Illinois school district serving the Lake County communities of Wauconda, Island Lake, Lakemoor, Volo, Port Barrington, and Lake Barrington. The district governs three elementary schools (Cotton Creek School, Robert Crown School, and Wauconda Grade School), two middle schools (Matthews Middle School and Wauconda Middle School), and one high school (Wauconda High School).

== Schools ==
- Cotton Creek School (elementary)
- Robert Crown School (elementary)
- Wauconda Grade School (elementary)
- Matthews Middle School
- Wauconda Middle School
- Wauconda High School
