= Aptakisic =

Aptakisic may refer to:

- Aptakisic, Illinois, an unincorporated community near Buffalo Grove, Illinois
- Aptakisic-Tripp Community Consolidated School District 102, a school district in Buffalo Grove, Illinois
- Chief Aptakisic, a Potawatomi chief
- Half Day, Illinois, an unincorporated community near Vernon Hills, Illinois
