= Cuba Township, Illinois =

Cuba Township
- Township
- Logo

- Location in Lake County

- Lake County's location in Illinois
- Coordinates: 42°11′56″N 88°09′47″W
- Country: United States
- State: Illinois
- County: Lake

Area
  - Total: 24.26 sq mi (62.8 km^{2})
  - Land: 22.83 sq mi (59.1 km^{2})
  - Water: 1.43 sq mi (3.7 km^{2}) 5.90%
- Elevation: 764 ft (233 m)

Population (2020)
  - Total: 17,292
  - Density: 757.4/sq mi (292.4/km^{2})
- Time zone: UTC-6 (CST)
  - Summer (DST): UTC-5 (CDT)
- FIPS code: 17-097-18004
- Website: cubatwpil.gov

Cuba Township is a township in Lake County, Illinois, USA. As of the 2020 census, its population was 17,292. Cuba Township was originally named Troy Township, but was renamed to Cuba in support of the López Expedition of 1851, when it was discovered the township name of Troy was already taken.

== Geography ==
According to the 2021 census gazetteer files, Cuba Township has a total area of 24.26 square miles (62.83 km^{2}), of which 22.83 square miles (59.13 km^{2}) (or 94.10%) is land and 1.43 square miles (3.70 km^{2}) (or 5.90%) is water. Lakes in this township include Davlins Pond, Grassy Lake, Honey Lake, Lake Barrington, Flint Lake, Lake Sheree and North Tower Lake. The stream of Flint Creek runs through this township.

=== Cities and towns ===
- Barrington Hills (northeast edge)
- Barrington (northwest quarter)
- Deer Park (west edge)
- Fox River Grove (east edge)
- Lake Barrington (vast majority)
- North Barrington (west three-quarters)
- Port Barringtion (southeast quarter)
- Tower Lakes

=== Other Community ===
- Cuba at 42.183912°N 88.190914°W

=== Adjacent townships ===
- Wauconda Township (north)
- Fremont Township (northeast)
- Ela Township (east)
- Palatine Township, Cook County (southeast)
- Barrington Township, Cook County (south)
- Algonquin Township, McHenry County (west)
- Nunda Township, McHenry County (northwest)

=== Cemeteries ===
The township contains two cemeteries: Saint Paul and White.

=== Major highways ===
- U.S. Route 14
- Illinois State Route 22
- Illinois State Route 59

== Demographics ==
As of the 2020 census there were 17,292 people, 6,514 households, and 4,545 families residing in the township. The population density was 712.93 inhabitants per square mile (275.26/km^{2}). There were 7,165 housing units at an average density of 295.40 per square mile (114.05/km^{2}). The racial makeup of the township was 86.65% White, 1.01% African American, 0.22% Native American, 4.67% Asian, 0.01% Pacific Islander, 1.15% from other races, and 6.29% from two or more races. Hispanic or Latino of any race were 4.60% of the population.

There were 6,514 households, out of which 29.00% had children under the age of 18 living with them, 62.83% were married couples living together, 4.27% had a female householder with no spouse present, and 30.23% were non-families. 25.40% of all households were made up of individuals, and 16.60% had someone living alone who was 65 years of age or older. The average household size was 2.53 and the average family size was 3.08.

The township's age distribution consisted of 21.6% under the age of 18, 7.5% from 18 to 24, 15.4% from 25 to 44, 32.4% from 45 to 64, and 23.1% who were 65 years of age or older. The median age was 49.6 years. For every 100 females, there were 100.3 males. For every 100 females age 18 and over, there were 95.3 males.

The median income for a household in the township was $133,250, and the median income for a family was $165,972. Males had a median income of $101,230 versus $51,563 for females. The per capita income for the township was $71,119. About 2.0% of families and 4.4% of the population were below the poverty line, including 3.6% of those under age 18 and 5.8% of those age 65 or over.

Historical population
Census	Pop.	Note	%±
2010	16,826		—
2020	17,292		2.8%
U.S. Decennial Census
