= Fremont Center, Illinois =

- Unincorporated community
- Location within Illinois Location within the United States
- Coordinates: 42°17′52″N 88°04′17″W
- Country: United States
- State: Illinois
- County: Lake
- Township: Fremont
- Elevation: 820 ft (250 m)
- Time zone: UTC-6 (Central (CST))
  - Summer (DST): UTC-5 (CDT)
- Area codes: 847 & 224
- GNIS feature ID: 422713

Fremont Center is an unincorporated community in Fremont Township, Lake County, Illinois, United States. Fremont Center is located at the junction of Illinois Route 60 and County Route 65V, 4.3 miles (6.9 km) west-northwest of downtown Mundelein.
