= Island Lake (Illinois) =

Reservoir in Illinois, United States

- Location within Illinois
- Location: Lake County, Illinois
- Coordinates: 42°16′35″N 88°11′51″W
- Type: reservoir
- Basin countries: United States
- Surface elevation: 748 ft (228 m)

Island Lake is a reservoir located in the village of Island Lake, Illinois, in the United States. It has several small islands.
