= Wauconda Township, Illinois =

Wauconda Township
- Township
- Location in Lake County

- Lake County's location in Illinois
- Coordinates: 42°17′02″N 88°09′19″W
- Country: United States
- State: Illinois
- County: Lake
- Established: November 6, 1849

Government
  - Supervisor: Glenn L. Swanson

Area
  - Total: 24.13 sq mi (62.5 km^{2})
  - Land: 22.79 sq mi (59.0 km^{2})
  - Water: 1.35 sq mi (3.5 km^{2}) 5.59%
- Elevation: 797 ft (243 m)

Population (2020)
  - Total: 23,628
  - Density: 1,037/sq mi (400.3/km^{2})
- Time zone: UTC-6 (CST)
  - Summer (DST): UTC-5 (CDT)
- FIPS code: 17-097-79280
- Website: www.waucondatownship.com

Wauconda Township is a township in Lake County, Illinois, USA. As of the 2020 census, its population was 23,628.

== Geography ==
According to the 2021 census gazetteer files, Wauconda Township has a total area of 24.13 square miles (62.50 km^{2}), of which 22.79 square miles (59.03 km^{2}) (or 94.41%) is land and 1.35 square miles (3.50 km^{2}) (or 5.59%) is water. Lakes in this township include Bangs Lake and Slocum Lake. The stream of Mutton Creek runs through this township.

=== Cities and towns ===
- Port Barrington (southwest corner)
- Island Lake (east half)
- Lake Barrington (south edge)
- Lakemoor (north edge)
- Volo (north edge)
- Wauconda (southeast corner)

=== Adjacent townships ===
- Grant Township (north)
- Avon Township (northeast)
- Fremont Township (east)
- Ela Township (southeast)
- Cuba Township (south)
- Algonquin Township, McHenry County (southwest)
- Nunda Township, McHenry County (west)
- McHenry Township, McHenry County (northwest)

=== Cemeteries ===
The township contains six cemeteries: Fisher Family (historic) west of Volo; Hope Grove (historic) east of Volo; Saint Peter Catholic in Volo; Slocum Family (historic) west of Wauconda; Volo (historic) in Volo; and Wauconda in Wauconda.

=== Major highways ===
- U.S. Route 12
- Illinois State Route 59
- Illinois State Route 60
- Illinois State Route 120
- Illinois State Route 176

=== Airports and landing strips ===
- Oak Knoll Farm Airport

== Demographics ==
As of the 2020 census there were 23,628 people, 8,847 households, and 6,339 families residing in the township. The population density was 979.03 inhabitants per square mile (378.01/km^{2}). There were 9,310 housing units at an average density of 385.76 per square mile (148.94/km^{2}). The racial makeup of the township was 75.14% White, 1.47% African American, 0.83% Native American, 3.69% Asian, 0.02% Pacific Islander, 8.05% from other races, and 10.80% from two or more races. Hispanic or Latino of any race were 18.83% of the population.

There were 8,847 households, out of which 34.70% had children under the age of 18 living with them, 57.93% were married couples living together, 7.96% had a female householder with no spouse present, and 28.35% were non-families. 21.00% of all households were made up of individuals, and 8.50% had someone living alone who was 65 years of age or older. The average household size was 2.68 and the average family size was 3.19.

The township's age distribution consisted of 23.8% under the age of 18, 8.3% from 18 to 24, 27% from 25 to 44, 27.7% from 45 to 64, and 13.0% who were 65 years of age or older. The median age was 37.8 years. For every 100 females, there were 102.3 males. For every 100 females age 18 and over, there were 102.5 males.

The median income for a household in the township was $88,771, and the median income for a family was $108,735. Males had a median income of $65,897 versus $38,726 for females. The per capita income for the township was $40,991. About 3.2% of families and 5.0% of the population were below the poverty line, including 2.5% of those under age 18 and 10.1% of those age 65 or over.

Historical population
| Census | Pop. | Note | %± |
|---|---|---|---|
| 2000 | 16,384 | | — |
| 2010 | 21,730 | | 32.6% |
| 2020 | 23,628 | | 8.7% |
U.S. Decennial Census
