= Hawthorn Woods, Illinois =

- Village
- Seal
- Motto: "Rural by Design"
- Location of Hawthorn Woods in Lake County, Illinois.
- Coordinates: 42°14′51″N 88°04′03″W
- Country: United States
- State: Illinois
- County: Lake
- Townships: Ela, Fremont

Area
  - Total: 8.25 sq mi (21.37 km^{2})
  - Land: 8.05 sq mi (20.84 km^{2})
  - Water: 0.20 sq mi (0.53 km^{2})
- Elevation: 853 ft (260 m)

Population (2020)
  - Total: 9,062
  - Density: 1,126/sq mi (434.8/km^{2})
- Time zone: UTC-6 (CST)
  - Summer (DST): UTC-5 (CDT)
- ZIP code: 60047
- Area code(s): 847, 224
- FIPS code: 17-33630
- GNIS feature ID: 2398267
- Website: www.vhw.org

Hawthorn Woods is a village in Fremont and Ela townships in Lake County, Illinois, United States. Per the 2020 census, the population was 9,062. The village is located approximately 40 miles (60 km) northwest of downtown Chicago. Hawthorn Woods was officially incorporated in 1958. Major transportation arteries include Midlothian Road, Old McHenry Road, Algonquin Road, Half Day Road, and the Elgin, Joliet and Eastern Railway.

== History ==
Hawthorn Woods was previously inhabited by the Potawatomi tribe. The 1833 Treaty of Chicago brought thousands of Native Americans in the Midwest to cede their lands, which Yankee farmers would lay claim to. The area became a popular destination for both German and Dutch immigrants.

== Geography ==
According to the 2021 census gazetteer files, Hawthorn Woods has a total area of 8.25 square miles (21.37 km^{2}), of which 8.05 square miles (20.85 km^{2}) (or 97.50%) is land and 0.21 square miles (0.54 km^{2}) (or 2.50%) is water.

== Demographics ==
Historical population
Census	Pop.	Note	%±
1960	239		—
1970	939		292.9%
1980	1,658		76.6%
1990	4,423		166.8%
2000	6,002		35.7%
2010	7,663		27.7%
2020	9,062		18.3%
U.S. Decennial Census; 2010 2020

=== Racial and ethnic composition ===
Hawthorn Woods village, Illinois – Racial and ethnic composition Note: the US Census treats Hispanic/Latino as an ethnic category. This table excludes Latinos from the racial categories and assigns them to a separate category. Hispanics/Latinos may be of any race.
Race / Ethnicity (NH = Non-Hispanic)	Pop 2000	Pop 2010	Pop 2020	% 2000	% 2010	% 2020
White alone (NH)	5,592	6,630	6,795	93.17%	86.52%	74.98%
Black or African American alone (NH)	41	104	121	0.68%	1.36%	1.34%
Native American or Alaska Native alone (NH)	1	10	10	0.02%	0.13%	0.11%
Asian alone (NH)	185	509	1,349	3.08%	6.64%	14.89%
Native Hawaiian or Pacific Islander alone (NH)	4	1	5	0.07%	0.01%	0.06%
Other race alone (NH)	3	2	18	0.05%	0.03%	0.20%
Mixed race or Multiracial (NH)	52	119	316	0.87%	1.55%	3.49%
Hispanic or Latino (any race)	124	288	448	2.07%	3.76%	4.94%
Total	6,002	7,663	9,062	100.00%	100.00%	100.00%

=== 2020 census ===
As of the 2020 census, Hawthorn Woods had a population of 9,062. The median age was 42.4 years. 26.8% of residents were under the age of 18 and 13.5% of residents were 65 years of age or older. For every 100 females there were 101.4 males, and for every 100 females age 18 and over there were 100.6 males age 18 and over.

99.9% of residents lived in urban areas, while 0.1% lived in rural areas.

There were 2,874 households in Hawthorn Woods, of which 44.9% had children under the age of 18 living in them. Of all households, 84.0% were married-couple households, 5.6% were households with a male householder and no spouse or partner present, and 7.8% were households with a female householder and no spouse or partner present. About 6.6% of all households were made up of individuals and 3.5% had someone living alone who was 65 years of age or older.

There were 2,975 housing units, of which 3.4% were vacant. The homeowner vacancy rate was 1.5% and the rental vacancy rate was 9.0%.

=== Income and poverty ===
The median income for a household in the village was $206,875, and the median income for a family was $224,000. Males had a median income of $125,192 versus $63,844 for females. The per capita income for the village was $69,631. About 0.6% of families and 1.5% of the population were below the poverty line, including 0.0% of those under age 18 and 6.5% of those age 65 or over.

In terms of quality of living and overall goodness, Hawthorn Woods ranks #24 in the State of Illinois.

In 2022, Hawthorn Woods ranks #8 as the wealthiest towns in Illinois and #81 nationwide.

== Notable people ==
- Dominick Basso, bookmaker for the Chicago Outfit.
- Leo Burnett founder of Leo Burnett Company, Inc..
- Anthony Castonzo, offensive tackle for the Indianapolis Colts.
- Nancy Faust, organist for the Chicago White Sox
- Alex Young, American professional baseball pitcher.
