= Ela Township, Illinois =

Ela Township
- Township
- Flag Logo

- Location in Lake County

- Lake County's location in Illinois
- Coordinates: 42°11′52″N 88°03′49″W
- Country: United States
- State: Illinois
- County: Lake
- Established: November 6, 1849

Government
  - Supervisor: Lucy A. Prouty

Area
  - Total: 35.9 sq mi (93.0 km^{2})
  - Land: 34.38 sq mi (89.0 km^{2})
  - Water: 1.50 sq mi (3.9 km^{2}) 4.17%
- Elevation: 830 ft (253 m)

Population (2020)
  - Total: 45,287
  - Density: 1,260/sq mi (487/km^{2})
- Time zone: UTC-6 (CST)
  - Summer (DST): UTC-5 (CDT)
- FIPS code: 17-097-22853
- Website: elatownship.gov

Ela Township is a township in Lake County, Illinois, USA. As of the 2020 census, its population was 45,287.

== History ==
Ela Township bears the name of George Ela, an Illinois legislator.

== Geography ==
According to the 2021 census gazetteer files, Ela Township has a total area of 35.88 square miles (92.93 km^{2}), of which 34.38 square miles (89.04 km^{2}) (or 95.83%) is land and 1.50 square miles (3.88 km^{2}) (or 4.17%) is water. Lakes in this township include Ashley Lake, Bresen Lake, Echo Lake, Forest Lake, Lake Germaine, Lake Louise, Lake Zurich and Leo Lake.

=== Cities and towns ===
- Barrington (northeast edge)
- Deer Park (vast majority)
- Forest Lake
- Hawthorn Woods (vast majority)
- Kildeer
- Lake Zurich
- Long Grove (west half)
- North Barrington (east quarter)

The United States Census data from the year 2000 shows Arlington Heights, primarily in Cook County, extending slightly into the southeast corner of Ela Township (covering 0.00 sq mi), as well as the southwest corner of Vernon Township (covering 0.01 sq mi) directly to the east of Ela. However, the Lake County GIS shows an even smaller extension into Vernon Township and none into Ela.

=== Adjacent townships ===
- Fremont Township (north)
- Libertyville Township (northeast)
- Vernon Township (east)
- Wheeling Township, Cook County (southeast)
- Palatine Township, Cook County (south)
- Barrington Township, Cook County (southwest)
- Cuba Township (west)
- Wauconda Township (northwest)

=== Cemeteries ===
The township contains three main cemeteries: Fairfield, Lake Zurich and Saint Matthew Lutheran.

=== Major highways ===
- U.S. Route 12
- Illinois State Route 22
- Illinois State Route 53

=== Airports and landing strips ===
- Honey Lake Heliport
- Rotor Swing Heliport

=== Railroad lines ===
- Canadian National Railway

== Demographics ==
As of the 2020 census there were 45,287 people, 14,970 households, and 12,682 families residing in the township. The population density was 1,262.14 inhabitants per square mile (487.31/km^{2}). There were 16,133 housing units at an average density of 449.63 per square mile (173.60/km^{2}). The racial makeup of the township was 79.47% White, 0.99% African American, 0.21% Native American, 10.87% Asian, 0.04% Pacific Islander, 2.06% from other races, and 6.36% from two or more races. Hispanic or Latino of any race were 6.69% of the population.

There were 14,970 households, out of which 40.70% had children under the age of 18 living with them, 74.18% were married couples living together, 7.77% had a female householder with no spouse present, and 15.28% were non-families. 12.30% of all households were made up of individuals, and 4.90% had someone living alone who was 65 years of age or older. The average household size was 2.93 and the average family size was 3.20.

The township's age distribution consisted of 25.6% under the age of 18, 8.2% from 18 to 24, 21.1% from 25 to 44, 32.4% from 45 to 64, and 12.7% who were 65 years of age or older. The median age was 41.2 years. For every 100 females, there were 99.0 males. For every 100 females age 18 and over, there were 93.7 males.

The median income for a household in the township was $140,440, and the median income for a family was $152,917. Males had a median income of $98,036 versus $53,396 for females. The per capita income for the township was $61,000. About 1.6% of families and 2.9% of the population were below the poverty line, including 2.4% of those under age 18 and 2.8% of those age 65 or over.

Historical population
Census	Pop.	Note	%±
2010	42,654		—
2020	45,287		6.2%
U.S. Decennial Census
