= Fremont Township, Illinois =

Township in Lake County, Illinois

Fremont Township
- Township
- Seal

- Location in Lake County

- Lake County's location in Illinois
- Coordinates: 42°16′56″N 88°03′31″W
- Country: United States
- State: Illinois
- County: Lake
- Established: November 6, 1849

Government
  - Supervisor: Peter Tekampe

Area
  - Total: 35.82 sq mi (92.8 km^{2})
  - Land: 34.16 sq mi (88.5 km^{2})
  - Water: 1.67 sq mi (4.3 km^{2}) 4.65%
- Elevation: 804 ft (245 m)

Population (2020)
  - Total: 33,422
  - Density: 978.4/sq mi (377.8/km^{2})
- Time zone: UTC-6 (CST)
  - Summer (DST): UTC-5 (CDT)
- FIPS code: 17-097-27923
- Website: www.fremonttownship.com

Fremont Township is a township in Lake County, Illinois, USA. As of the 2020 census, its population was 33,422.

== History ==
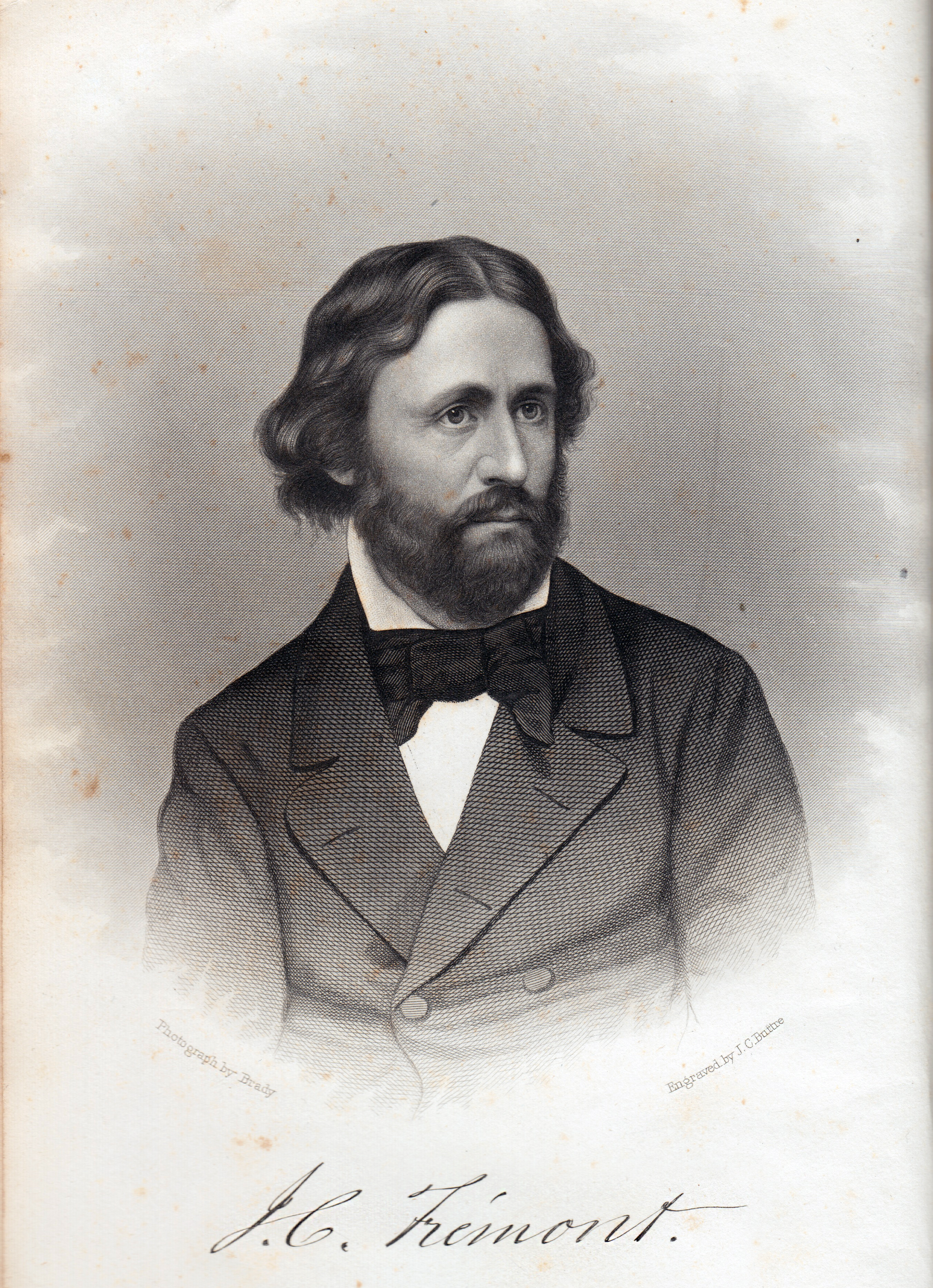
John C. Frémont, the namesake of the township

The land of the township was first settled by Europeans in 1835, and the first permanent settlements by Europeans were built in 1836, and the first house was built by a settler named William Fenwick on the south side of Diamond Lake. The first post office named was established in the township was in 1839 between Half Day and McHenry, until it was disestablished in 1842. The post office was named after its postmaster, Charles Darling.

In 1837, a settlement inside the township was called "Fort Hill Settlement" after a prairie hill in the northwest of the township, and would establish its post office in the spring of the following year.

The first church established was the Fremont Congressional Church on February 20, 1838, halfway between Ivanhoe and Mundelein. The church initially was made up of sixteen members, twelve of which were from Hartford, New York. The church was initially Presbyterian but would change denominations to Congregationalism in 1844. A Catholic Church would be established three years later in 1841 named St. John's Roman Catholic Church. in the 1850s, a Methodist Episcopal Church in Diamond Lake and a German Catholic Church south of Fremont Center would be established.

A vote was held to decide the name of the township on January 12, 1850. While the name of "Gilmer", from the Secretary of the Navy at the time Thomas Walker Gilmer, won the plurality of the votes, it failed to reach a majority of the votes required to adopt the name. "Fremont" was chosen as a compromise name after the explorer and future presidential candidate John C. Frémont. The first town meeting for the township was held the same year. The first supervisor appointed was Hurlburt Swan, a man from Connecticut who also served in the Illinois General Assembly. During the American Civil War, over 120 people from the township enlisted for the military, killing 34 during the conflict.

== Geography ==
According to the 2021 census gazetteer files, Fremont Township has a total area of 35.82 square miles (92.77 km^{2}), of which 34.16 square miles (88.47 km^{2}) (or 95.35%) is land and 1.67 square miles (4.33 km^{2}) (or 4.65%) is water. Lakes in this township include Countryside Lake, Davis Lake, Diamond Lake, Lake Fairfield and Schreiber Lake.

=== Villages ===
- Grayslake
- Hawthorn Woods
- Libertyville
- Long Grove
- Mundelein
- North Barrington
- Round Lake
- Wauconda

=== Adjacent townships ===
- Avon Township (north)
- Warren Township (northeast)
- Libertyville Township (east)
- Vernon Township (southeast)
- Ela Township (south)
- Cuba Township (southwest)
- Wauconda Township (west)
- Grant Township (northwest)

=== Cemeteries ===
The township contains five cemeteries: Ivanhoe, Saint Mary's Catholic, Transfiguration Catholic, Union and United States Naval.

=== Major highways ===
- U.S. Route 12
- U.S. Route 45
- Illinois State Route 60
- Illinois State Route 83
- Illinois State Route 137
- Illinois State Route 176

=== Airports and landing strips ===
- Air Estates Airport
- Campbell Airport

== Demographics ==
As of the 2020 census there were 33,422 people, 12,374 households, and 9,071 families residing in the township. The population density was 933.00 inhabitants per square mile (360.23/km^{2}). There were 12,764 housing units at an average density of 356.32 per square mile (137.58/km^{2}). The racial makeup of the township was 70.51% White, 1.66% African American, 0.62% Native American, 7.99% Asian, 0.04% Pacific Islander, 8.90% from other races, and 10.27% from two or more races. Hispanic or Latino of any race were 19.61% of the population.

There were 12,374 households, out of which 27.70% had children under the age of 18 living with them, 65.38% were married couples living together, 5.47% had a female householder with no spouse present, and 26.69% were non-families. 24.60% of all households were made up of individuals, and 16.30% had someone living alone who was 65 years of age or older. The average household size was 2.63 and the average family size was 3.14.

The township's age distribution consisted of 18.9% under the age of 18, 8.4% from 18 to 24, 20.7% from 25 to 44, 31.1% from 45 to 64, and 21.0% who were 65 years of age or older. The median age was 46.7 years. For every 100 females, there were 94.2 males. For every 100 females age 18 and over, there were 96.5 males.

The median income for a household in the township was $99,024, and the median income for a family was $122,591. Males had a median income of $54,925 versus $41,652 for females. The per capita income for the township was $48,366. About 1.6% of families and 3.9% of the population were below the poverty line, including 2.8% of those under age 18 and 6.2% of those age 65 or over.

As of 2023, the poverty percentage was 4.6%, below the 7.8% of Lake County.

Historical population
Census	Pop.	Note	%±
1930	1,198		—
1940	1,349		12.6%
1950	3,046		125.8%
1960	8,303		172.6%
1970	12,186		46.8%
1980	12,234		0.4%
1990	14,280		16.7%
2000	23,955		67.8%
2010	32,377		35.2%
2020	33,422		3.2%
U.S. Decennial Census
