= Trout Valley, Illinois =

- Village
- Location of Trout Valley in McHenry County, Illinois.
- Coordinates: 42°11′49″N 88°15′06″W
- Country: United States
- State: Illinois
- County: McHenry
- Township: Algonquin
- Founded: March 19, 1996

Area
  - Total: 0.43 sq mi (1.11 km^{2})
  - Land: 0.43 sq mi (1.11 km^{2})
  - Water: 0 sq mi (0.00 km^{2})
- Elevation: 791 ft (241 m)

Population (2020)
  - Total: 515
  - Density: 1,204.6/sq mi (465.11/km^{2})
- Time zone: UTC-6 (CST)
  - Summer (DST): UTC-5 (CDT)
- ZIP code: 60013
- Area codes: 847 & 224
- FIPS code: 17-76160
- GNIS feature ID: 2400004
- Website: www.troutvalleyil.com

Trout Valley is a village in McHenry County, Illinois, United States. It was incorporated as a village on March 19, 1996. Per the 2020 census, the population was 515.

== History ==
Maxon Community Developers of Barrington, Illinois, founders and developers of nearby Streamwood, Barrington Woods, Brigadoon, and later Green Valley, Arizona purchased the Curtiss Candy Farms in 1952 from Otto Schnering, founder of the Curtiss Candy Company. The brothers Norm and Don Maxon promptly renamed it Trout Valley after Norman's passion for fly fishing.

The estate was once the private estate of John D. Hertz of Hertz Car Rentals, modeled during the gilded age after English estates complete with riding stables, polo grounds, trout fishing and pheasant hunting. Norman Maxon, an avid outdoorsman, reestablished the trout hatchery and approached National Homes of Lafayette, Indiana to develop Trout Valley as a national showcase for their modular homes. By 1956, Trout Valley won the National Home development of the year and the concept of a homeowners association was conceived by C.E.O. Don Maxon as a way to maintain the integrity of Trout Valley.

Trout Valley was once part of unincorporated McHenry County until it became its own village. The residents attend schools in the Cary School District, and the village itself does not have any of its own schools, fire department, or police department. The land was once a farm owned by John D. Hertz and still contains residual structures from that period of time.

At the west side of the village, a magnificent arched set of iron gates with stone pillars mark the entrance at Cary-Algonquin Road. These were probably erected by Mr. Hertz in the 1920s. In 2006, this entrance was designated as a local landmark by the McHenry County Historic Preservation Commission. This protects and preserves the gates by an ordinance enacted by the McHenry County Board.

The first mayor of Trout Valley was Steve Barrett. Since then, Bob Baker has been the village mayor.

== Geography ==
According to the 2010 census, Trout Valley has a total area of 0.432 square miles (1.12 km^{2}), of which 0.43 square miles (1.11 km^{2}) (or 99.54%) is land and 0.002 square miles (0.01 km^{2}) (or 0.46%) is water. There are various small ponds with streams that connect them. The village rests against the Fox River.

== Demographics ==
Historical population
Census	Pop.	Note	%±
2000	599		—
2010	537		−10.4%
2020	515		−4.1%
U.S. Decennial Census; 2010 2020

Trout Valley village, Illinois – Racial and ethnic composition Note: the US Census treats Hispanic/Latino as an ethnic category. This table excludes Latinos from the racial categories and assigns them to a separate category. Hispanics/Latinos may be of any race.
Race / Ethnicity (NH = Non-Hispanic)	Pop 2000	Pop 2010	Pop 2020	% 2000	% 2010	% 2020
White alone (NH)	559	513	466	93.32%	95.53%	90.49%
Black or African American alone (NH)	1	3	3	0.17%	0.56%	0.58%
Native American or Alaska Native alone (NH)	0	0	2	0.00%	0.00%	0.39%
Asian alone (NH)	6	5	2	1.00%	0.93%	0.39%
Pacific Islander alone (NH)	0	1	0	0.00%	0.19%	0.00%
Other race alone (NH)	0	0	0	0.00%	0.00%	0.00%
Mixed race or Multiracial (NH)	8	0	18	1.34%	0.00%	3.50%
Hispanic or Latino (any race)	25	15	24	4.17%	2.79%	4.66%
Total	599	537	515	100.00%	100.00%	100.00%

=== 2000 Census ===
As of the census of 2000, there were 559 people, 197 households, and 176 families residing in the village. The population density was 1,399.7 inhabitants per square mile (540.4/km^{2}). There were 200 housing units at an average density of 467.3 per square mile (180.4/km^{2}). The racial makeup of the village was 93.32% White, 0.17% African American, 1.00% Asian, 1.17% from other races, and 1.34% from two or more races. Hispanic or Latino of any race were 4.17% of the population.

There were 197 households, out of which 40.1% had children under the age of 18 living with them, 85.3% were married couples living together, 3.6% had a female householder with no husband present, and 10.2% were non-families. 6.1% of all households were made up of individuals, and 3.6% had someone living alone who was 65 years of age or older. The average household size was 3.04 and the average family size was 3.18.

In the village, the population was spread out, with 30.9% under the age of 18, 4.0% from 18 to 24, 23.9% from 25 to 44, 30.7% from 45 to 64, and 10.5% who were 65 years of age or older. The median age was 40 years. For every 100 females, there were 101.7 males. For every 100 females age 18 and over, there were 97.1 males.

The median income for a household in the village was $99,297, and the median income for a family was $102,603. Males had a median income of $91,504 versus $37,344 for females. The per capita income for the village was $58,013. About 3.3% of families and 3.4% of the population were below the poverty line, including 3.2% of those under age 18 and 3.3% of those age 65 or over.
