= Fox River Grove, Illinois =

Fox River Grove
- Village
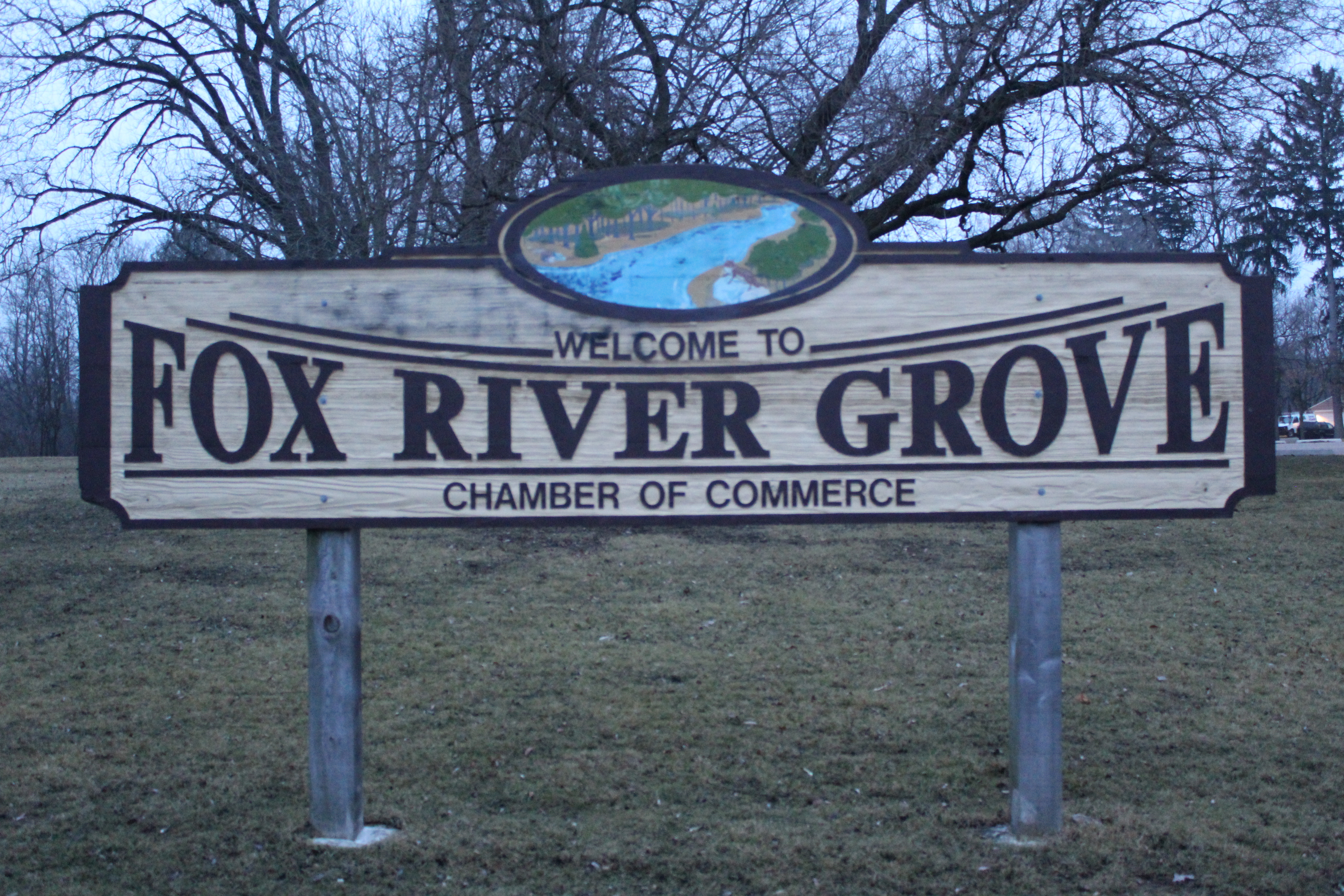
- Village sign in Lions Park

- Flag Logo
- Nicknames: FRG and The Grove
- Location of Fox River Grove in McHenry County and Lake County, Illinois.
- Coordinates: 42°11′44″N 88°12′53″W
- Country: United States
- State: Illinois
- County: McHenry, Lake
- Founded: 1919

Government
  - Type: Village

Area
  - Total: 1.71 sq mi (4.43 km^{2})
  - Land: 1.71 sq mi (4.43 km^{2})
  - Water: 0 sq mi (0.00 km^{2})
- Elevation: 771 ft (235 m)

Population (2020)
  - Total: 4,702
  - Density: 2,748.7/sq mi (1,061.28/km^{2})
- Time zone: UTC-6 (CST)
  - Summer (DST): UTC-5 (CDT)
- ZIP Code(s): 60021
- Area code: 847
- FIPS code: 17-27533
- GNIS feature ID: 2398913
- Website: www.foxrivergrove.org

Fox River Grove (FRG) is a village in Algonquin Township, McHenry County and Cuba Township, Lake County, Illinois, United States. As per 2020 census, the population was 4,702. In 1919, the village of Fox River Grove was officially incorporated, becoming the ninth village in McHenry County. The Grove is situated along the southern shore of the Fox River.

== History ==
=== Indigenous peoples ===
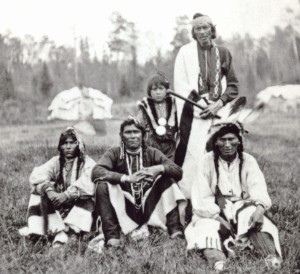
Chippewa men and boys

Long before the arrival of Europeans, Native Americans called the land within Fox River Grove home. The Ojibwe (also known as Chippewa) people continued to winter in the Fox River Valley into the 1860s. The women traded beadwork and purses with local settlers while the men trapped muskrat and mink, selling the pelts in nearby Barrington, Illinois. The area's proximity to Northwest Highway (Route 14), a major military and trade road, enabled such commerce to thrive. The men also made fence posts for local farmers and would "spear fish at night using torches attached to the ends of their birchbark canoes." When spring came, they traveled north to their summer lands in Wisconsin. Between 1816 and 1833, the Ojibwe and U.S. governments engaged in peace talks, resulting in several land cession treaties being signed. Eventually, the federal government took control of all Ojibwe land in Illinois. The rapid increase of European-American settlers, coupled with pressures from the government and military, eventually forced this dynamic and proud people to leave the lands that would soon become the FRG and relocate west of the Mississippi River.

=== Czech heritage ===
Pioneers built homesteads in the Fox River Valley between 1830 and 1860. They were originally drawn to the area that would become Fox River Grove for its scenery and abundance of water. Some of the first settlers to call the Grove home were Czechoslovak immigrants who—by way of Chicago—established a Bohemian enclave along the Fox River. Attracted to the area for its prime fishing spots and access to 19th-century entertainment venues, Czechs built cottages among the village's hills and on the river's southern bank.

In 1850, ethnic-Czech Frank Opatrny purchased 80 acres (32 ha) of land on the southern shore of the Fox River. Considered to be the patriarch of the village's founding family, Frank's son Eman Opatrny put FRG on the map by turning his homestead into the regionally known Picnic Grove.

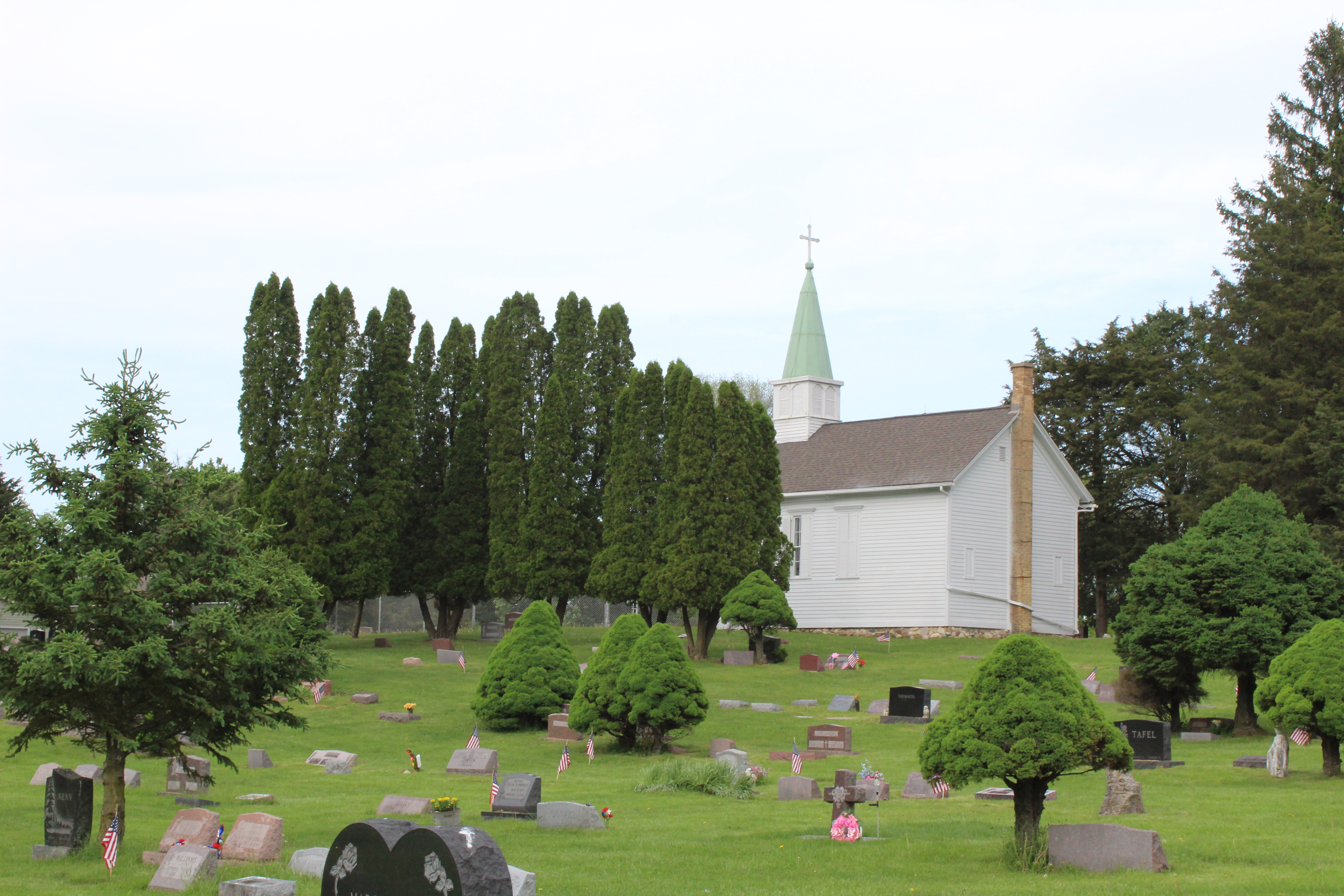
Saint John Nepomucene Cemetery

The Czech community established St. John's Nepomucene Catholic Church and Cemetery on the southwest fringe of Fox River Grove in 1861. Named after a patron saint of Bohemia, the sanctuary's construction began in 1871 and was finished in 1874. Because of the church's small congregation, St. John's did not support a resident priest. Instead, a Chicago-based priest would visit the congregation once a year; for the rest of the year, Bohemian-speaking members of the church would conduct services. While St. John's stopped hosting worship services in 1914, the cemetery remains open to this day.

In 1900, Edward and Francis Konopasek, a Czech couple after whom one Fox River Grove's wards is named after, built the Grove's first hotel, the Hotel Fox and likewise established a taxi service that shuttled notables like the Chicago Mayor Anton J. Cermak and Illinois Attorney General Otto Kerner Sr. from the nearest train stations to the Grove.

FRG was once also home to a Czech-styled castle replete with 100 stained glass windows. It was built by John Legat Sr. in 1920, but most of the castle is now dismantled.

=== Resort town period ===
Starting in the mid-nineteenth century, Czech immigrants transformed the Grove from a backwater pioneer settlement into a resort town. Chicagoans were attracted to the Grove's waterfront and surrounding hilly woodlands. Staying in establishments such as the Hotel Fox, Chicagoans traveled to the Grove via the Illinois & Wisconsin Railroad station and livery bus shuttle in neighboring Cary, Illinois.

The resort was racially segregated. One 1944 advertisement for the resort in the Chicago Times described it as a "restricted area" and "Bohemian settlement".

=== Picnic Grove heyday ===
In 1899, Eman Opatrny bought his father Frank's homestead and converted it into picnicking grounds. Known as the Fox River Picnic Grove, this large swath of land housed picnic plots (including sheltered areas), a shooting gallery, a horse track, six bars, a boathouse, boat docks, a dancing platform, a restaurant, a photo gallery, rowboat rentals, a bowling alley, a railroad spur track, a steam-powered excursion boat, and baseball diamonds. Trainloads of pleasure-seekers would pour into the park for weekend getaways. Opatrny also built many cottages near the river's edge.

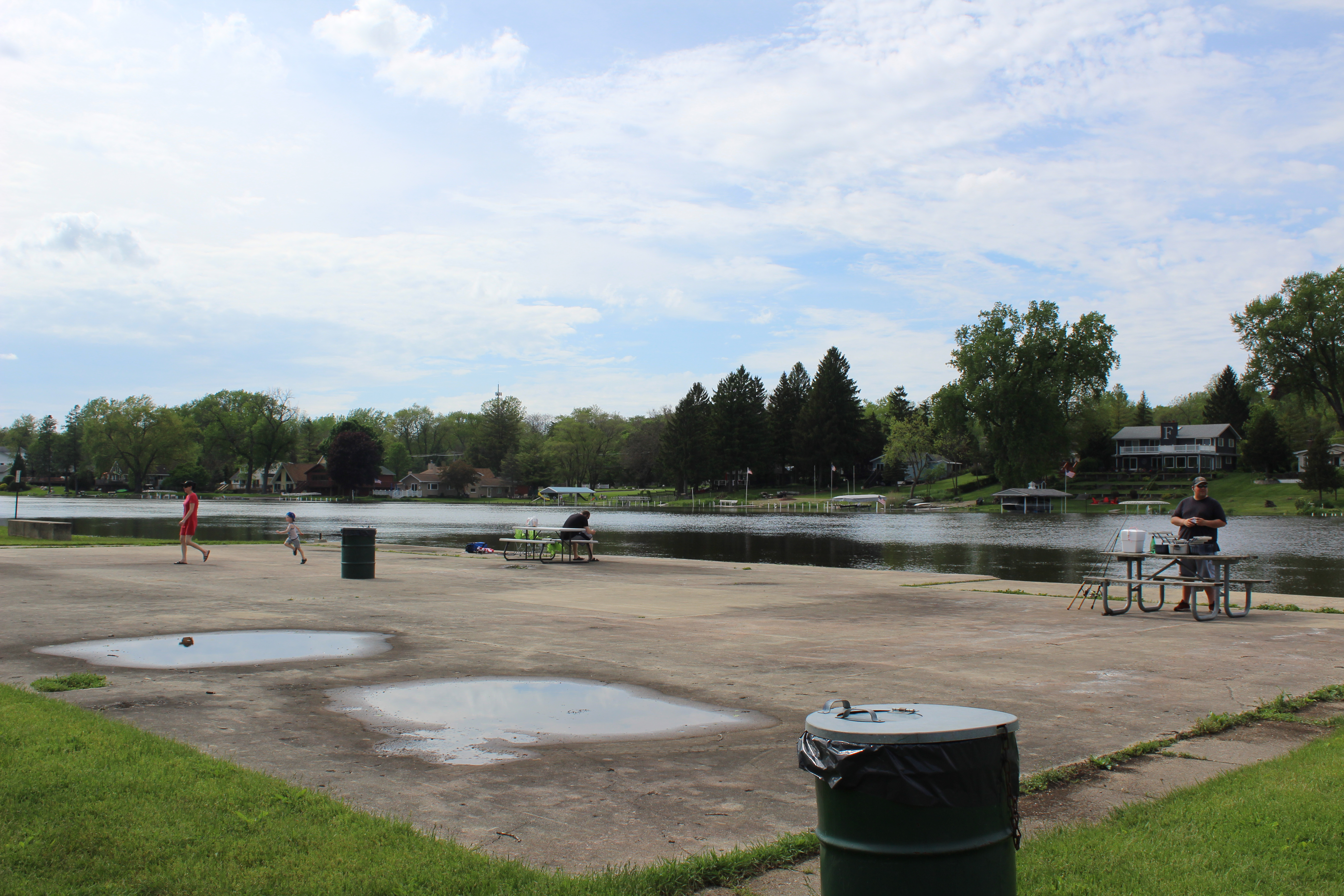
The Grove Marina's foundation slab now lies in ruin in Picnic Grove Park

The Picnic Grove suffered a major blow in 1918 during a fire; most of the attractions from the early 1900s were lost. In 1942, Louis Jr. and Clara Cernocky purchased the Picnic Grove. The couple added more amenities, including a new dance pavilion, an air-conditioned cocktail lounge, and a 300-foot sandy beach. It fell into disarray in the 1960s. The Grove Marina, opened in 1961, was an entertainment center that included a restaurant and a cocktail lounge with live entertainment, but was destroyed by yet another fire in the mid-1970s. The Village of Fox River Grove obtained a grant to acquire 40 acres (16 ha) along the river in 1994, naming the property "Picnic Grove Park"; the rest of the land not purchased by the village was sold to subdivision developers.

=== Other resort-era establishments ===
Besides the Picnic Grove, FRG welcomed the addition of a luxury hotel in 1902. Christened as the Castle Pavilion and Resort Hotel, the establishment had windows displayed during Chicago's 1893 Columbian Exposition, the area's first player piano, and a dance floor. During the 1910s, the Castle Pavilion even showed motion pictures, a novelty at the time.

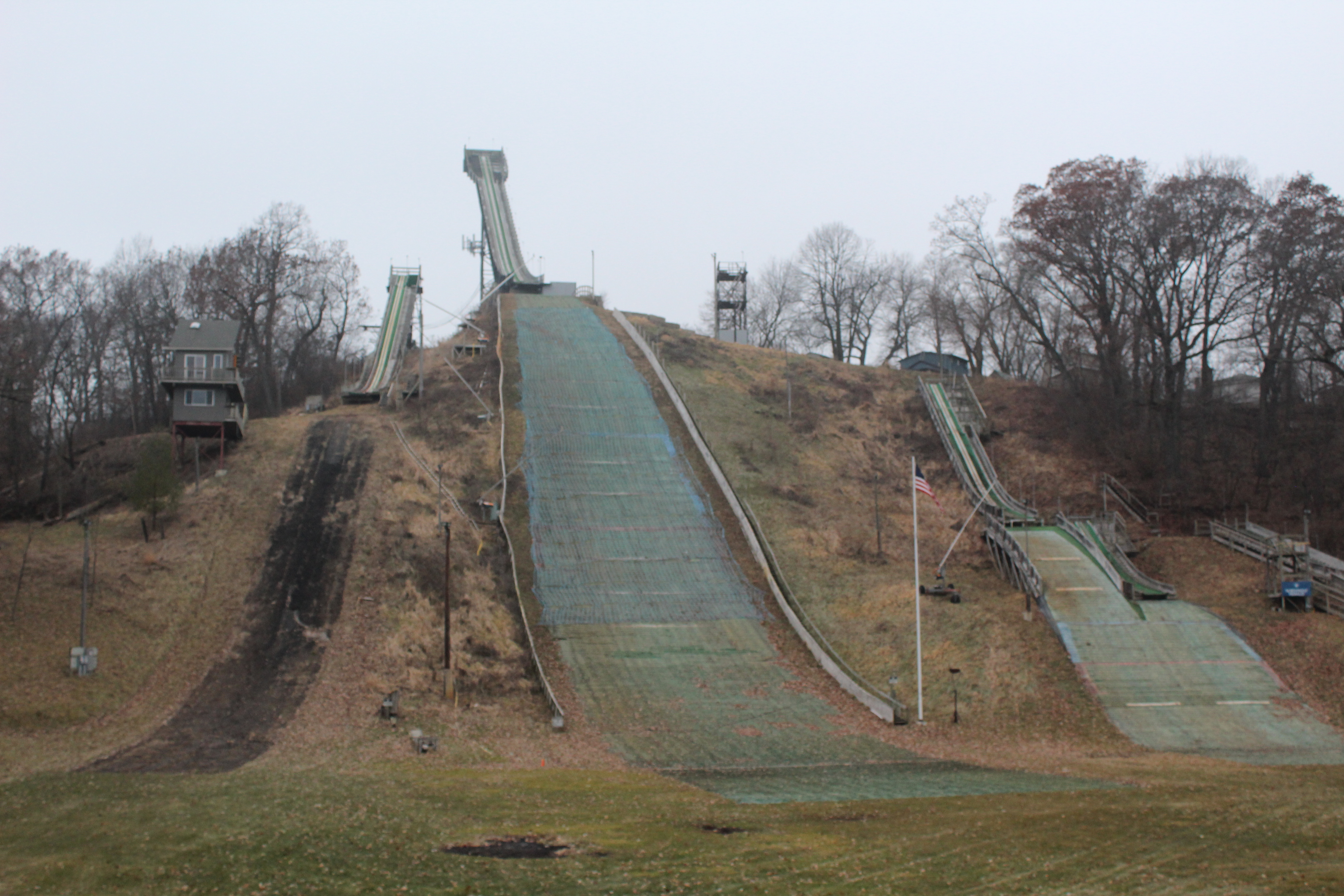
Jumping hills at the Norge Ski Club

In 1905, a group of ethnically-Norwegian men from Chicago established the Norge Ski Club in FRG. Utilizing its three ski jumps, the club hosts international competitions during the winter months. The Norge Ski Club is the oldest continuously open ski club in the United States. During the spring and summer, snow is substituted by plastic tarps that are laid along the jumps. In the colder months, snow machines are employed to ensure that the slopes have a continual dusting of snow. In 2018, three of its members were named to the men's U.S. Olympic ski jump team. In 2022, three of its members were named to the men's U.S. Olympic ski jump team.

Although it no longer stands, Fox-River Grove Inn - Louie's Place was an FRG mainstay for years. Built by Louis Cernocky Sr. at the corner of Northwest Highway and Lincoln Avenue, the establishment became a watering hole for many prominent Chicago residents and several notorious gangsters. Louie's Place also housed the Crystal Ballroom, an eight-sided dance hall built in 1923 where big-bands—including Glenn Miller, Coon-Sanders, Wayne King, Louis Panico, Fred Waring, Frankie Masters, Art Kassel, and Guy Lombardo—entertained patrons. In 1921, Cernocky added a retail section to the building, and in 1922 the plot of land was subdivided and named Cernocky's Subdivision of Block 12. In 1939, a suspicious fire broke out in the ballroom. A week later, four men saturated the ballroom with kerosene while their other two counterparts abducted the night watchman and a visiting fire marshall. These strange vandals fled by car towards Barrington, as their two planted bombs detonated at the scene of the crime. On the lam, the criminals released their captives near Palatine, Illinois. Although the explosions' resulting fire gutted the ballroom, the roof and the adjoining shops survived. The ballroom was repaired, but strangely enough, it never reopened for dancers.

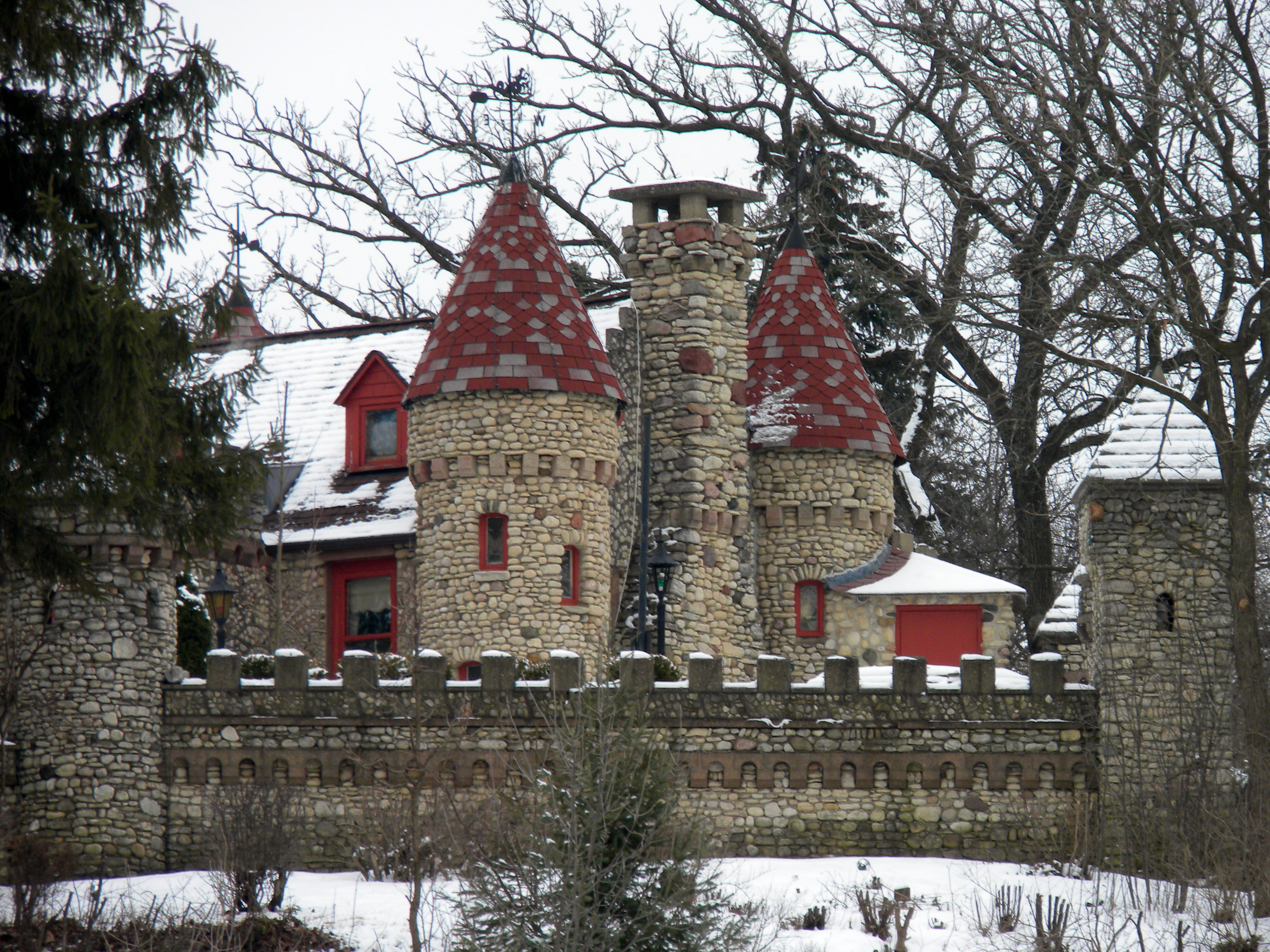
Snow-dusted Castle Vianden

In 1931, Theodore "Teddy" Bettendorf began work on what would come to be known as Castle Vianden, which is located along what is now U.S. Route 14. Being an immigrant from Vianden, Luxembourg, Teddy spent 36 years building his castle in the Luxembourgian style. By 1960, the castle, which was open to visitors, had eight towers, a guard room, bugle tower, castle yard, enclosed sun porch, modern kitchen, garage, dungeon, and a wishing well. Bettendorff continued to add to his castle until his death in 1967. During the 1970s, the castle was rented out as a honeymoon retreat. The castle remains a private residence, but recently the owners of the property have been engaged in an ongoing effort to reopen the property for public enjoyment.

In 1945, Fox River Grove established the first VFW post in McHenry County.

The Barberry Hills Ski Area—a ski hill complete with two rope tows, a vertical drop of 145 feet, and a ski shop—was established in the early 1960s. While the rope tows and shop are now defunct, the hill itself is still a destination for sledding in winter.

=== Gang-related activity ===
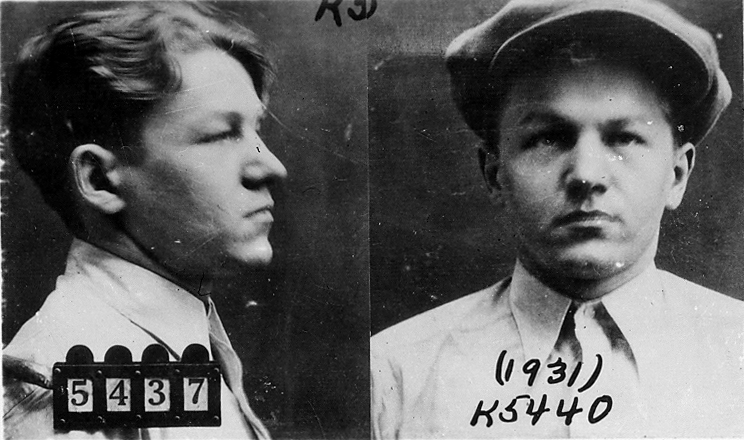
Baby Face Nelson's 1931 mug shot

During the Prohibition Era, Fox River Grove hosted a number of Chicago area crime syndicates. From bottom-rung bootleggers to the ringleaders themselves, gangsters of all stripes staked out the Grove for both business and merry-making. Located on the Fox River, the Grove served as a smuggling hub, with its waterways providing a transportation route. At the same time, the village's small and relatively remote nature helped to shelter gang activity from the Chicago Police Department and federal authorities. Above all, however, this criminals' playground was only made possible by Louis Cernocky Sr., a local legend to this day. Cernocky's property assets throughout FRG—along with his double-life stature as both a respected citizen and Capone gang bootlegger—allowed the operation to flourish. Thanks to Cernocky, outlaws prowled the Fox River banks and frequented Cernocky's local establishments such as the Crystal Ballroom at Louie's Place—a multi-use establishment that served as a restaurant, big-band dance hall, speakeasy, and gangster hideout. Importantly, members of the Dillinger Gang and Barker-Karpis Gang were regulars. Notable gangster visitors to Louie's Place included Alvin "Creepy" Karpis, "Ma" Barker, Freddie Barker, "Baby Face" Nelson, John Dillinger, Homer Van Meter, and Tommy Carroll. The Grove was finally released from the gangsters' grasp in 1934. Having already neutralized Dillinger in Chicago, federal agents pursued and fatally shot Baby Face Nelson on nearby Route 14 in The Battle of Barrington. With most of the ringleaders dead or behind bars, the Grove's gangster era soon came to an end.

=== Suburban growth ===
During the economic prosperity of the 1990s, Fox River Grove experienced a housing boom. In 1994, 6 out of 7 of the village's trustees voted to allow a luxury housing development to be built on 62 acres (25 ha) within the 102-acre (41 ha) Picnic Grove—a stretch of land straddling the banks of the Fox River. Despite having the support of the Board of Trustees, the decision was deemed controversial by many members of the community. The housing development was built, with requirements for developers including mandatory public space creation, specified amounts of money given to the local library and school districts, and the compulsory replacement of trees chopped down in the wake of new development.

=== Level crossing accident ===
On October 25, 1995, a Metra passenger train, running express towards Chicago, collided with a Cary-Grove High School school bus, killing seven high school students. The accident brought reform and increased safety standards nationwide for signaled rail crossings located near street and highway intersections which are regulated by traffic signals, also known as interconnected crossings.

=== 21st century ===
On August 21, 2019, Fox River Grove celebrated its 100th anniversary. To celebrate the centennial, the village hosted historical tours, a carnival, and a parade during the summer of 2019.

As of December 2019, FRG has become a debt-free village. According to Village President Nunamaker, this was attained through "the accumulation of operational cost savings over the past several years and fiscally responsible decision making by the village board."

== Geography ==
Fox River Grove is located primarily in McHenry County and partially in Lake County, along US 14, 42 miles (68 km) northwest of Chicago. It is situated on the south bank of the Fox River, which flows southwest to the Illinois River. The village of Cary is located on the north side of the river, connected to Fox River Grove by a bridge on Route 14.

According to the 2021 census gazetteer files, Fox River Grove has a total area of 1.71 square miles (4.43 km^{2}), all land.

=== Environmental concerns ===
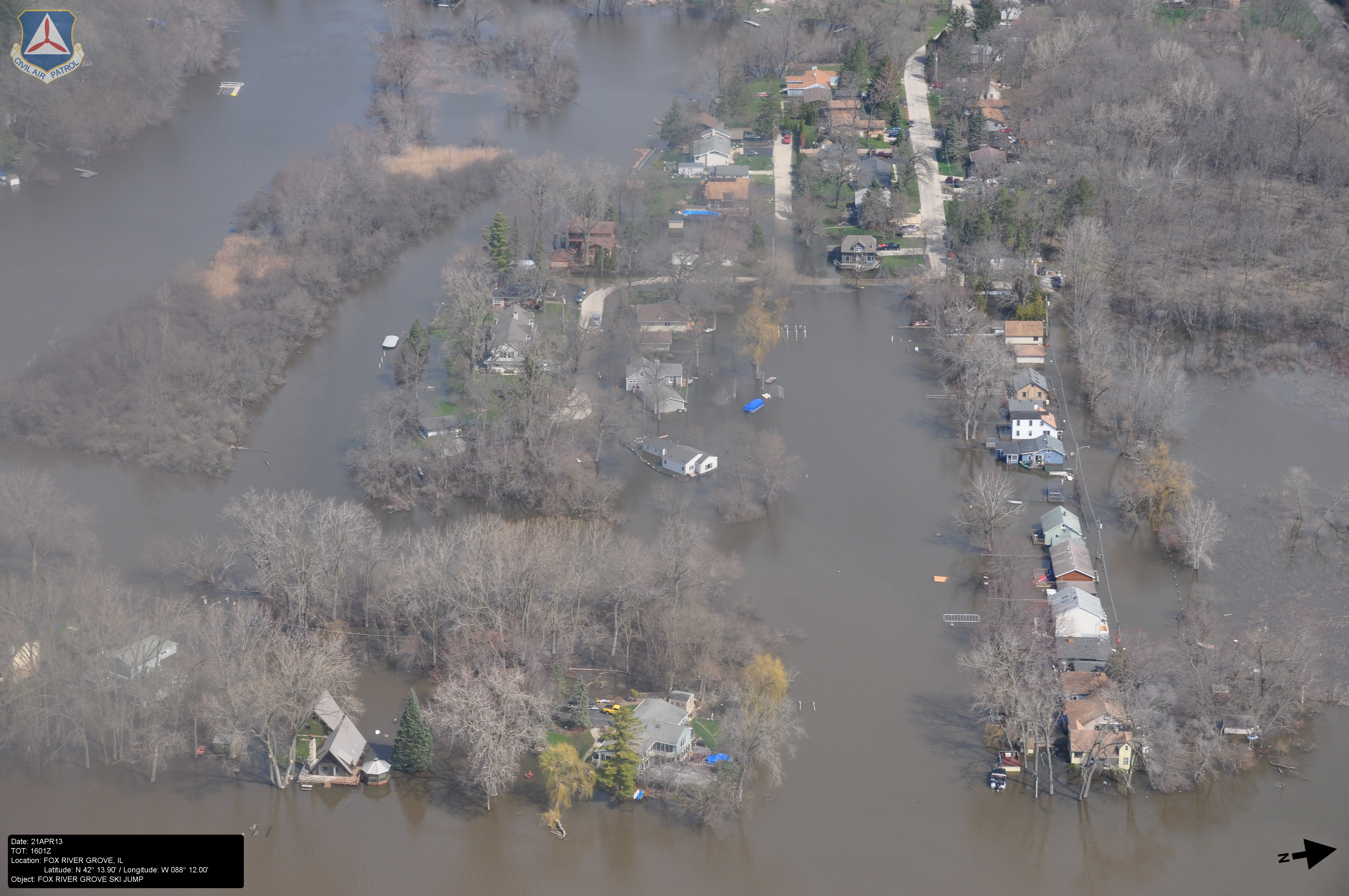
Homes devastated by a 2013 flood

Much of the Grove is located within the Fox River's floodplain. As a result, waterfront properties in the village are at risk of flooding. Seasonal rains in the spring and summer often wash over the backyards and parks that line the river, resulting in property damage, erosion, and the spreading of trash and pollutants from the river onto land. In order to stymie erosion in 2020, the village dumped loads of rocks along a 500-foot stretch of riverbank in Picnic Grove Park. Some residents voiced concern that this would destroy the silty bank used by children as a beach; however, it was determined that covering the beach with stone was a necessary move to make in order to preserve the shoreline.

== Demographics ==
Historical population
Census	Pop.	Note	%±
1920	193		—
1930	641		232.1%
1940	693		8.1%
1950	1,313		89.5%
1960	1,866		42.1%
1970	2,245		20.3%
1980	2,515		12.0%
1990	3,551		41.2%
2000	4,862		36.9%
2010	4,854		−0.2%
2020	4,702		−3.1%
U.S. Decennial Census; 2010 2020

=== Racial and ethnic composition ===
Fox River Grove village, Illinois – Racial and ethnic composition Note: the US Census treats Hispanic/Latino as an ethnic category. This table excludes Latinos from the racial categories and assigns them to a separate category. Hispanics/Latinos may be of any race.
Race / Ethnicity (NH = Non-Hispanic)	Pop 2000	Pop 2010	Pop 2020	% 2000	% 2010	% 2020
White alone (NH)	4,542	4,354	3,866	93.42%	89.70%	82.22%
Black or African American alone (NH)	24	28	36	0.49%	0.58%	0.77%
Native American or Alaska Native alone (NH)	6	5	3	0.12%	0.10%	0.06%
Asian alone (NH)	62	140	188	1.28%	2.88%	4.00%
Native Hawaiian or Pacific Islander alone (NH)	0	0	0	0.00%	0.00%	0.00%
Other race alone (NH)	1	0	18	0.02%	0.00%	0.38%
Mixed race or Multiracial (NH)	41	66	202	0.84%	1.36%	4.30%
Hispanic or Latino (any race)	186	261	389	3.83%	5.38%	8.27%
Total	4,862	4,854	4,702	100.00%	100.00%	100.00%

=== 2020 census ===
As of the 2020 census, Fox River Grove had a population of 4,702. There were 1,316 families residing in the village. The median age was 40.1 years. 23.6% of residents were under the age of 18 and 12.8% of residents were 65 years of age or older. For every 100 females, there were 104.5 males, and for every 100 females age 18 and over, there were 101.3 males.

100.0% of residents lived in urban areas, while 0.0% lived in rural areas.

There were 1,762 households in Fox River Grove, of which 34.8% had children under the age of 18 living in them. Of all households, 59.5% were married-couple households, 16.9% were households with a male householder and no spouse or partner present, and 18.1% were households with a female householder and no spouse or partner present. About 22.7% of all households were made up of individuals, and 7.0% had someone living alone who was 65 years of age or older.

The population density was 2,748.10 inhabitants per square mile (1,061.05/km^{2}). There were 1,836 housing units at an average density of 1,073.06 per square mile (414.31/km^{2}). Of the housing units, 4.0% were vacant. The homeowner vacancy rate was 1.5% and the rental vacancy rate was 7.0%.

=== Income and poverty ===
The median income for a household in the village was $116,442, and the median income for a family was $132,500. Males had a median income of $68,646 versus $39,375 for females. The per capita income for the village was $47,951. About 0.0% of families and 1.5% of the population were below the poverty line, including 0.0% of those under age 18 and 8.6% of those age 65 or over.

== Government and amenities ==
The Village of Fox River Grove is classified as a non-home rule municipality. It is led by a Village President who is elected for a four-year term without term limits. The current Village President is Marc McLaughlin.

In 1936 the FRG Library Board was established. The building's front facade is surrounded by a wall of rock slabs, erected in honor of the victims of the 1995 bus-train collision.

== Education ==
=== Elementary and Middle School ===
The majority of children in the village are serviced by Fox River Grove School District #3. This district is made up of two schools: Algonquin Road Elementary School and Fox River Grove Middle School.

Algonquin Road Elementary School (colloquially known as ARS) provides a Kindergarten through 4th-grade educational curriculum with a 12:1 student-teacher ratio. In 2019, 52% of ARS students were deemed "proficient" in math, and only 47% tested at or above Illinois's set proficiency level in reading.

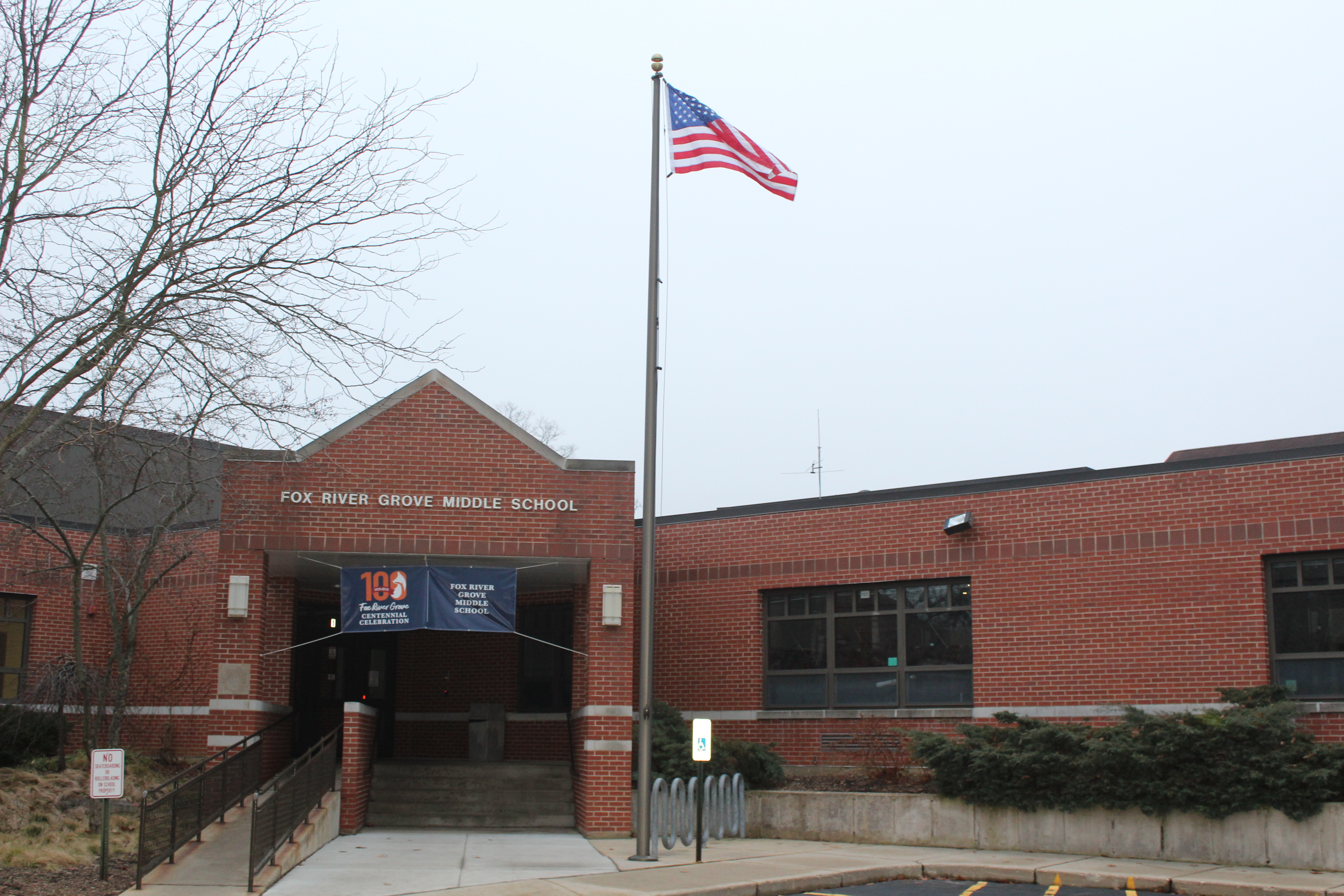
Fox River Grove Middle School

Two hundred and five students in 5th through 8th grade attended Fox River Grove Middle School (FRGMS) in 2019. 53% of FRGMS students were proficient in math in 2019, and 55% were proficient in reading. The middle school's student-to-teacher ratio was 14:1.

=== High schools ===
Most students in the village attend Cary-Grove Community High School located across the Fox River in neighboring Cary.

== Parks and recreation ==
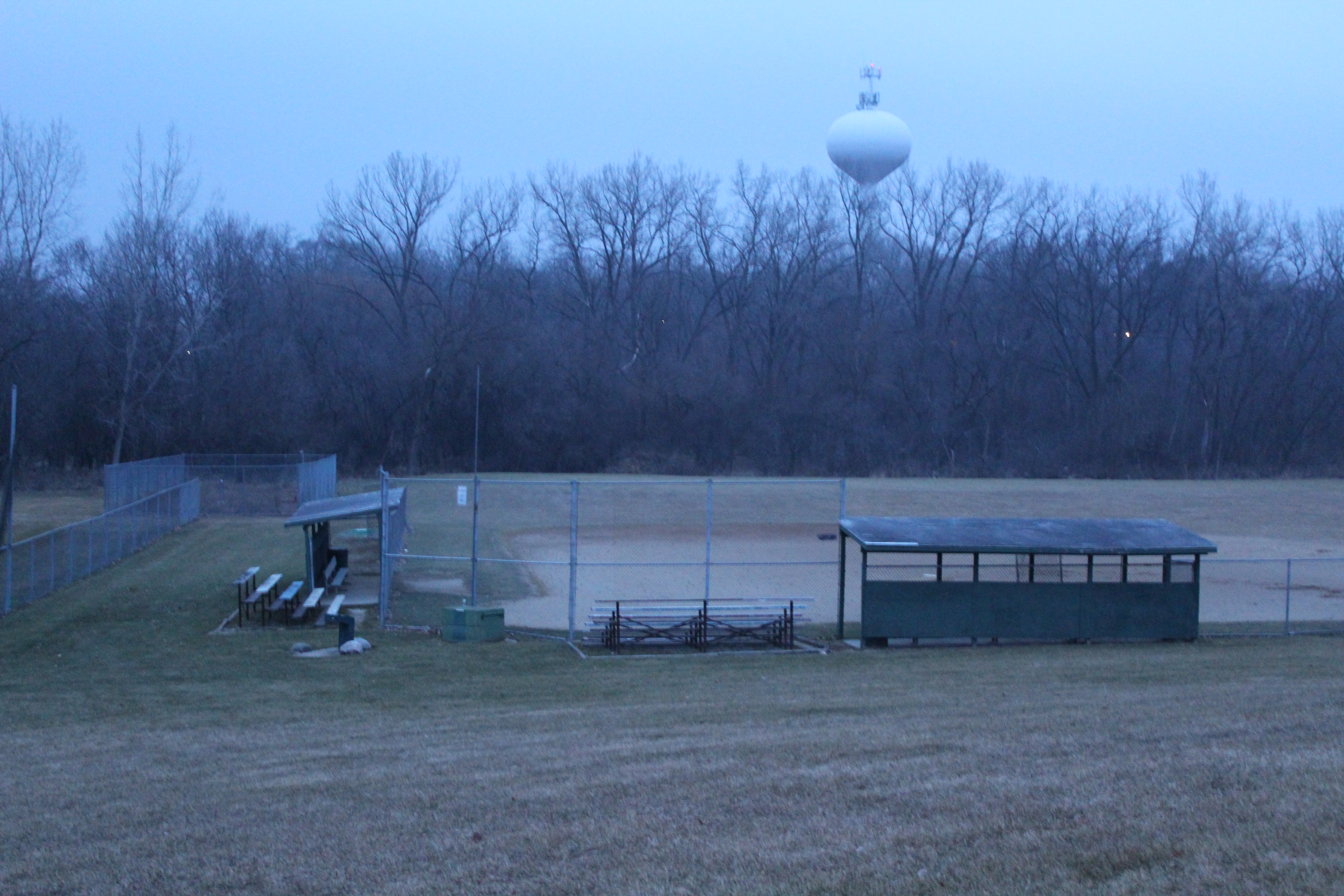
Baseball diamond in Old Hunt Park

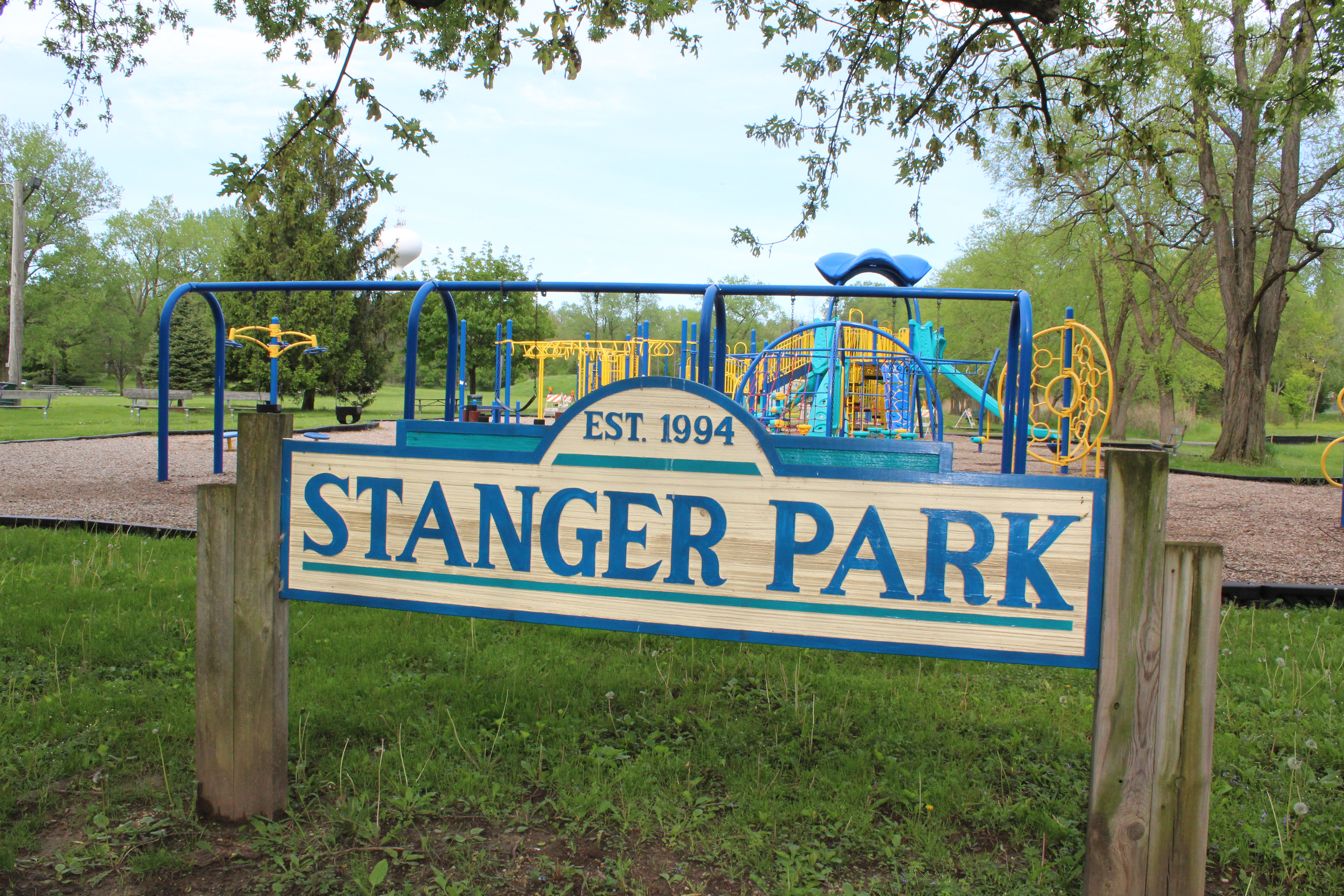
Stanger Park

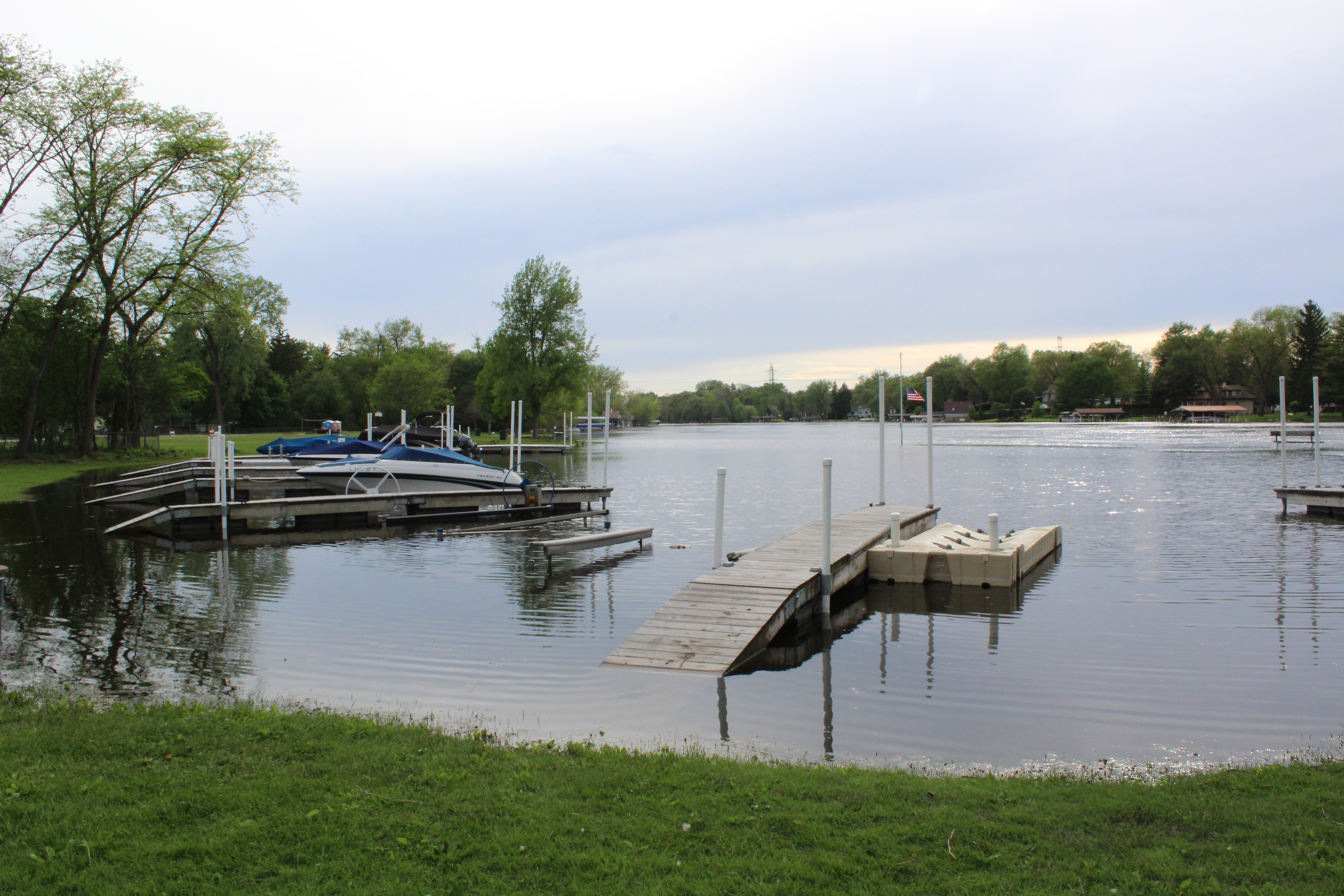
Lions Park marina affected by a seasonal flood

Over 100 acres (40 ha) in Fox River Grove are classified as public parks and open space. Between the village's 11 parks, access to playgrounds, basketball and volleyball courts, Port-A-Johns, sledding hills, baggo (cornhole) sets, soccer and baseball fields, picnic areas, fishing spots, hiking areas, and an ice-skating area are made available to residents and visitors.

The village's small size has inhibited it from being able to support an official park district, so recreational activities are planned and administered by the volunteer-run Fox River Grove Rec Council. Sporting opportunities offered by the Council include a men's basketball league, an adult volleyball league, and a youth soccer program. Youth baseball, softball, and basketball leagues are administered by Cary-Grove organizations.

During the annual Fireworks Celebration (always on the Saturday after the 4th of July), Fox River Grove shoots off fireworks from 30-acre (12 ha) Picnic Grove Park. Also in July, Picnic Grove Park serves as the "battlefield" for the Fox River Grove Fire District's water fights.

The FRG Rec Council hosts its annual Fox Chase 5K in Stanger Park. A youth mile alternative is offered for youngsters.

Lions Park, on the Fox River, provides scenic views of Cary. This waterside park is the site of Lions Fest, a yearly September festival in which Fox River Grove residents gather to converse and eat roasted corn. The lesser-known Arts & Crafts Fair is also hosted at Lions Park each July. In 2019, the village celebrated its centennial. The highlight of this celebration was a temporary carnival installed at Lions Park.

Park name	Acres	Facilities	Neighborhood(s)
Picnic Grove Park	30	Sled hill, playground, volleyball court, Port-A-John	Picnic Grove
Foxmoor Park	30	Fishing holes, hiking trails, gazebo	Foxmoor
Victoria Woods Park	22	Grassy knoll	Victoria Woods
Hunters Farm Park	15	Baseball field, soccer field, playground	Hunters Farm
Old Hunt Park	9	Sled hill, baseball field, soccer field, snack shack, Port-A-John	Foxmoor
Spring Creek & Maple Parks	9	Fishing zone, hiking trail, picnic area	Hillview Estates, Konopasek, Maplewood Meadow Estates, Venetian Gardens
Algonquin Road & Stanger Parks	7	Soccer field, basketball court, ice rink (seasonal), sewage/runoff ditch, hiking trail, playground	Foxmoor
Lions Park	6	Fishing zone, picnic area, shelter, volleyball court, playground, sandy beach, basketball hoops, Port-A-John	Vorisek
Foxmoor Jaycee Park	3.5	Fishing hole, soccer field, basketball hoops, baseball field, shelter, picnic area, hiking trail, playground	Foxmoor
North River Parks	1	Fishing zone, playground, picnic area	3 individual parks hugging the river's bank

== Business ==
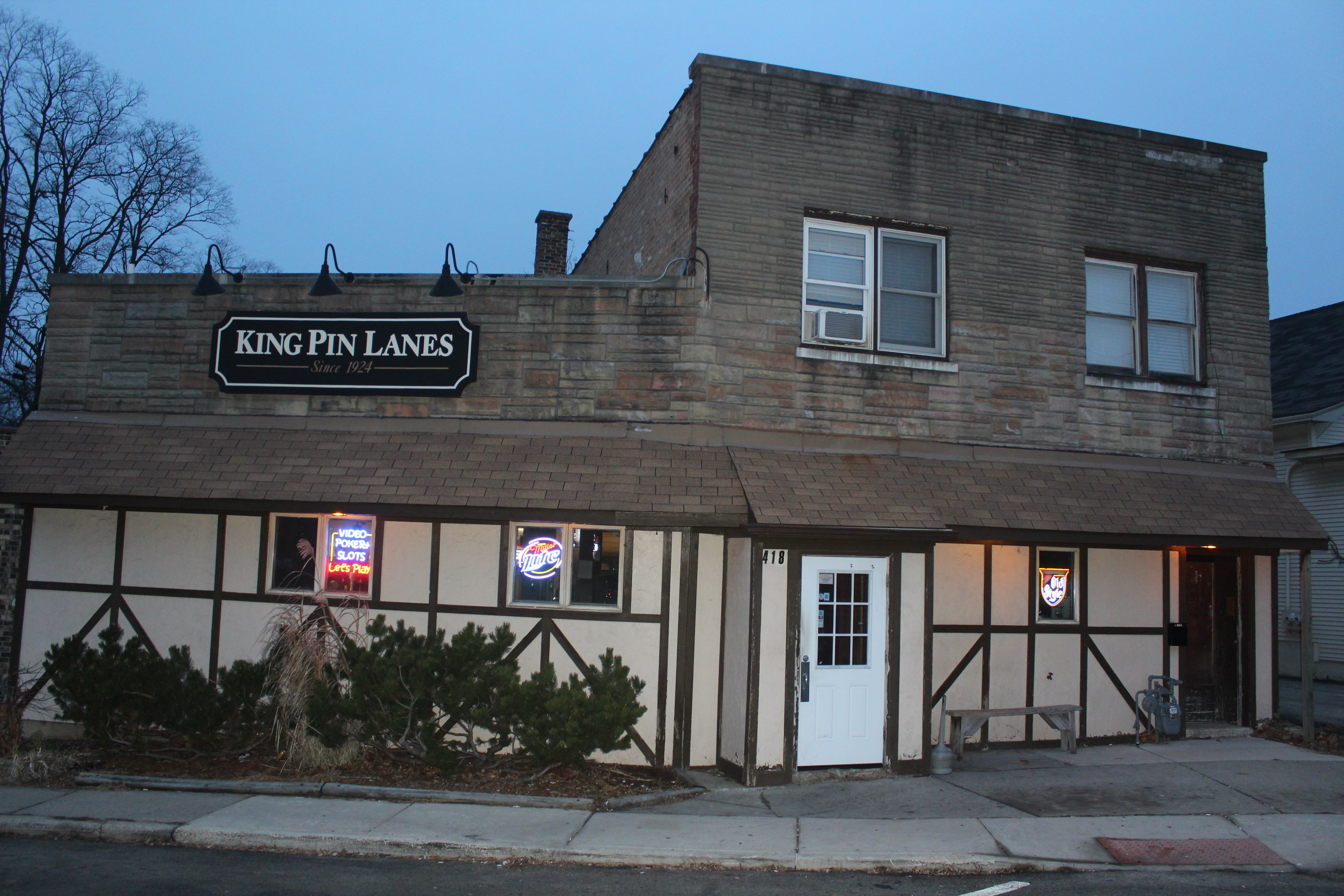
King Pin Lanes

Built in 1924, King Pin Lanes became the first bowling alley to open in McHenry County.

In 2012, the village legalized slot machines. There are two shopping centers: Stone Hill Center and Foxmoor Crossing. The centers contain several stores and chain restaurants typical of American suburbs. In 2020, a Culver's replaced Mr. Beefy's hot dog shack on Northwest Highway.

== Transportation ==
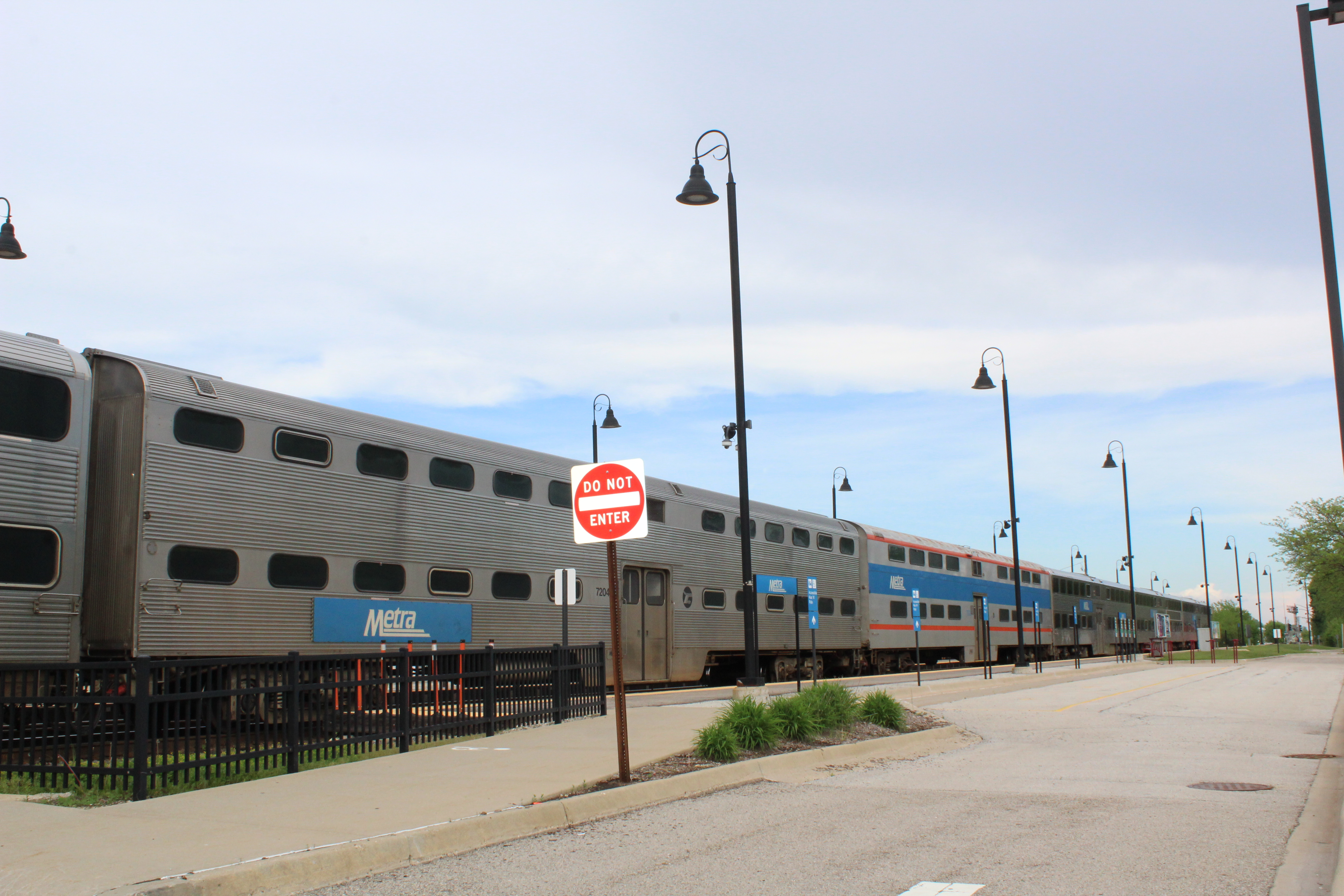
A Metra train at Fox River Grove

The main artery running through Fox River Grove is U.S. Route 14, also known as Northwest Highway. Those traveling north on Route 14 can access the cities of Cary, Crystal Lake, and Woodstock; cities along Route 14 found south of the village include Barrington, Palatine, Arlington Heights, Mount Prospect, Des Plaines, Park Ridge, and Chicago. Illinois Route 22 also passes through FRG, connecting the village to North Barrington, Lake Zurich, Long Grove, Lincolnshire, the Tri-State Tollway, Bannockburn, and Highland Park. Moreover, Algonquin Road allows quick access to the villages south of FRG including Algonquin, Lake in the Hills, and Carpentersville. FRG residents can make use of the MCRide system, a dial-a-ride service that offers rides between several McHenry County municipalities.

FRG has one Metra station along the Union Pacific Northwest line which connects Harvard, Illinois to Chicago's Ogilvie Transportation Center. Non-express trips between the village Metra station and Chicago take about 70 minutes.

== Sport ==
In 2017 Norge Ski Club ski jumpers Kevin Bickner and Casey Larson qualified for the Olympic team based on their performances in the World Cup, while Michael Glasder qualified by winning the Olympic Trial in Park City, Utah on December 31. The three jumpers from Norge Ski Club constituted 3/4 of the Men's Olympic Ski Jumping team in 2018, which made U.S. Olympic history by marking the first time three men from the same ski club represented the United States in ski jumping at the games.
