= Aptakisic, Illinois =

- Unincorporated community
- Location within Illinois Location within the United States
- Coordinates: 42°10′57″N 87°56′50″W
- Country: United States
- State: Illinois
- County: Lake
- Township: Vernon
- Elevation: 686 ft (209 m)
- Time zone: UTC-6 (Central (CST))
  - Summer (DST): UTC-5 (CDT)
- Area codes: 847 & 224
- GNIS feature ID: 403584

Aptakisic is an unincorporated community in Lake County, Illinois, United States. Aptakisic is located along Aptakisic Road and the Canadian National Railway; it borders Buffalo Grove to the west and Lincolnshire to the east.

The name Aptakisic is derived from Chief Aptakisic of the Potawatomie tribe; it is one of two unincorporated communities named in his honor, the other being Half Day.
