= Island Lake, Illinois =

- Village
- Village of Island Lake
- Emblem
- Motto: "A community of friendly people"
- Location of Island Lake in Lake County, Illinois.
- Coordinates: 42°16′42″N 88°11′59″W
- Country: United States
- State: Illinois
- Counties: Lake, McHenry
- Townships: Nunda, Wauconda

Area
  - Total: 3.56 sq mi (9.22 km^{2})
  - Land: 3.35 sq mi (8.68 km^{2})
  - Water: 0.21 sq mi (0.55 km^{2})
- Elevation: 761 ft (232 m)

Population (2020)
  - Total: 8,051
  - Density: 2,403.7/sq mi (928.06/km^{2})
- Time zone: UTC-6 (CST)
  - Summer (DST): UTC-5 (CDT)
- ZIP code: 60042
- Area codes: 847, 224
- FIPS code: 17-37894
- GNIS feature ID: 2398279
- Website: www.villageofislandlake.com

Island Lake is a village in Lake and McHenry counties in the U.S. state of Illinois. Per the 2020 census, the population was 8,051. The village surrounds Island Lake, a lake which contains a small island.

== History ==
The village was incorporated on June 25, 1952.

== Geography ==
Island Lake is a village lying in the northwest Chicago suburbs.

According to the 2021 census gazetteer files, Island Lake has a total area of 3.56 square miles (9.22 km^{2}), of which 3.35 square miles (8.68 km^{2}) (or 94.07%) is land and 0.21 square miles (0.54 km^{2}) (or 5.93%) is water.

== Demographics ==
Historical population
Census	Pop.	Note	%±
1960	1,639		—
1970	1,973		20.4%
1980	2,293		16.2%
1990	4,449		94.0%
2000	8,153		83.3%
2010	8,080		−0.9%
2020	8,051		−0.4%
U.S. Decennial Census; 2010 2020

=== Racial and ethnic composition ===
Island Lake village, Illinois – Racial and ethnic composition Note: the US Census treats Hispanic/Latino as an ethnic category. This table excludes Latinos from the racial categories and assigns them to a separate category. Hispanics/Latinos may be of any race.
Race / Ethnicity (NH = Non-Hispanic)	Pop 2000	Pop 2010	Pop 2020	% 2000	% 2010	% 2020
White alone (NH)	7,233	6,623	6,137	88.72%	81.97%	76.23%
Black or African American alone (NH)	40	78	96	0.49%	0.97%	1.19%
Native American or Alaska Native alone (NH)	7	6	10	0.09%	0.07%	0.12%
Asian alone (NH)	132	151	159	1.62%	1.87%	1.97%
Native Hawaiian or Pacific Islander alone (NH)	1	1	1	0.01%	0.01%	0.01%
Other race alone (NH)	7	10	21	0.09%	0.12%	0.26%
Mixed race or Multiracial (NH)	54	81	299	0.66%	1.00%	3.71%
Hispanic or Latino (any race)	679	1,130	1,328	8.33%	13.99%	16.49%
Total	8,153	8,080	8,051	100.00%	100.00%	100.00%

=== 2020 census ===
As of the 2020 census, Island Lake had a population of 8,051, with 3,116 households and 2,053 families residing in the village. The population density was 2,261.52 inhabitants per square mile (873.18/km^{2}). There were 3,232 housing units at an average density of 907.87 per square mile (350.53/km^{2}).

The median age was 41.3 years. 21.1% of residents were under the age of 18 and 12.2% were 65 years of age or older. The age distribution also included 7.5% from 18 to 24, 25.0% from 25 to 44, and 30.8% from 45 to 64. For every 100 females there were 100.2 males, and for every 100 females age 18 and over there were 98.0 males age 18 and over.

99.7% of residents lived in urban areas, while 0.3% lived in rural areas.

Of the 3,116 households, 31.0% had children under the age of 18 living in them. 52.2% were married-couple households, 17.4% were households with a male householder and no spouse or partner present, and 22.6% were households with a female householder and no spouse or partner present. About 24.2% of all households were made up of individuals, and 7.2% had someone living alone who was 65 years of age or older. The average household size was 3.16 and the average family size was 2.68.

Of the 3,232 housing units, 3.6% were vacant. The homeowner vacancy rate was 1.7% and the rental vacancy rate was 3.7%.

=== Income and poverty ===
The median income for a household in the village was $83,970, and the median income for a family was $95,087. Males had a median income of $54,050 versus $36,000 for females. The per capita income for the village was $35,714. About 5.5% of families and 8.5% of the population were below the poverty line, including 10.7% of those under age 18 and 9.4% of those age 65 or over.

== Education ==
School-age residents of Island Lake attend Wauconda CUSD 118.
