= Vernon Township, Illinois =

Vernon Township
- Township
- Location in Lake County

- Lake County's location in Illinois
- Coordinates: 42°11′49″N 87°56′33″W
- Country: United States
- State: Illinois
- County: Lake
- Established: November 6, 1849

Government
  - Supervisor: Tim Kobler
  - Assessor: Curtis Perlman

Area
  - Total: 36.27 sq mi (93.9 km^{2})
  - Land: 35.83 sq mi (92.8 km^{2})
  - Water: 0.44 sq mi (1.1 km^{2}) 1.21%
- Elevation: 669 ft (204 m)

Population (2020)
  - Total: 71,377
  - Density: 1,992/sq mi (769.2/km^{2})
- Time zone: UTC-6 (CST)
  - Summer (DST): UTC-5 (CDT)
- FIPS code: 17-097-77668
- Website: www.vernontownship.com

Vernon Township is a township in Lake County, Illinois, USA. As of the 2020 census, its population was 71,377. The name "Vernon Township" comes from George Washington's estate, Mount Vernon.

== Geography ==
According to the 2021 census gazetteer files, Vernon Township has a total area of 36.27 square miles (93.94 km^{2}), of which 35.83 square miles (92.80 km^{2}) (or 98.79%) is land and 0.44 square miles (1.14 km^{2}) (or 1.21%) is water. The stream of Indian Creek runs through this township. All communities within the township are North Central suburbs of Chicago.

=== Cities and towns ===
- Arlington Heights (northern edge of municipality)
- Bannockburn (western edge of municipality)
- Buffalo Grove (north three-quarters of Village)
- Indian Creek
- Lake Forest (west edge of Village)
- Lincolnshire (vast majority)
- Long Grove (east half)
- Mettawa (south half)
- Mundelein (southeast edge)
- Riverwoods (west three-quarters)
- Vernon Hills (south half)
- Wheeling (north edge)

=== Unincorporated towns ===
- Aptakisic
- Half Day
- Prairie View

=== Adjacent townships ===
- Libertyville Township (north)
- Shields Township (northeast)
- West Deerfield Township (east)
- Northfield Township, Cook County (southeast)
- Wheeling Township, Cook County (south)
- Palatine Township, Cook County (southwest)
- Ela Township (west)
- Fremont Township (northwest)

=== Cemeteries ===
The township contains eight cemeteries: Diamond Lake, Gridley, Knopf, Long Grove, Lutheran, Vernon, Willow Lawn and Zion City.

=== Major highways ===
- Interstate 94
- U.S. Route 45
- Illinois State Route 21
- Illinois State Route 22
- Illinois State Route 53
- Illinois State Route 60
- Illinois State Route 83

=== Airports and landing strips ===
- Chicagoland Airport (historical)

== Demographics ==
As of the 2020 census there were 71,377 people, 24,736 households, and 19,129 families residing in the township. The population density was 1,967.88 inhabitants per square mile (759.80/km^{2}). There were 27,639 housing units at an average density of 762.01 per square mile (294.21/km^{2}). The racial makeup of the township was 61.41% White, 1.61% African American, 0.35% Native American, 28.05% Asian, 0.03% Pacific Islander, 2.75% from other races, and 5.80% from two or more races. Hispanic or Latino of any race were 7.00% of the population.

There were 24,736 households, out of which 38.00% had children under the age of 18 living with them, 66.92% were married couples living together, 8.06% had a female householder with no spouse present, and 22.67% were non-families. 20.30% of all households were made up of individuals, and 10.90% had someone living alone who was 65 years of age or older. The average household size was 2.70 and the average family size was 3.14.

The township's age distribution consisted of 23.9% under the age of 18, 7.2% from 18 to 24, 23.5% from 25 to 44, 28.5% from 45 to 64, and 17.0% who were 65 years of age or older. The median age was 41.6 years. For every 100 females, there were 93.1 males. For every 100 females age 18 and over, there were 91.3 males.

The median income for a household in the township was $126,982, and the median income for a family was $152,270. Males had a median income of $92,279 versus $50,743 for females. The per capita income for the township was $60,585. About 4.0% of families and 5.3% of the population were below the poverty line, including 7.1% of those under age 18 and 5.4% of those age 65 or over.

Historical population
Census	Pop.	Note	%±
2010	67,095		—
2020	71,377		6.4%
U.S. Decennial Census
