= Port Barrington, Illinois =

Port Barrington, Illinois Fox River Valley Gardens
- Village
- Logo
- Interactive map of Port Barrington and the surrounding area.
- Coordinates: 42°14′49″N 88°12′02″W
- Country: United States
- State: Illinois
- Counties: Lake, McHenry
- Townships: Nunda, Wauconda, Algonquin, Cuba
- Founded: 1927
- Incorporated: 1969
- Re-Incorporated: 2002

Area
  - Total: 1.32 sq mi (3.42 km^{2})
  - Land: 1.16 sq mi (3.00 km^{2})
  - Water: 0.16 sq mi (0.41 km^{2})
- Elevation: 732 ft (223 m)

Population (2020)
  - Total: 1,584
  - Density: 1,365.3/sq mi (527.16/km^{2})
- Time zone: UTC-6 (CST)
  - Summer (DST): UTC-5 (CDT)
- ZIP code: 60010
- Area code(s): 847, 224
- FIPS code: 17-61216
- GNIS feature ID: 2399001
- Website: www.portbarrington.net

Port Barrington (also referred to as Fox River Valley Gardens or FRG) is a village in Lake and McHenry counties in the U.S. state of Illinois. It was formerly known as Fox River Valley Gardens, but the name was changed in 2002 to Port Barrington. Per the 2020 census, the population was 1,584.

== History ==
The village of Port Barrington was incorporated in 1969 under the name Fox River Valley Gardens. At the time, the village had the longest name out of all other incorporated places in Illinois, and was one of the longest town names in the country. Port Barrington still shares a ZIP code (60010) with the village of Barrington, 9 miles (14 km) to the south.

In 2002, the village established its own post office. Homeowners in the new Riverwalk subdivision claimed that their home values fell significantly and immediately when their addresses were changed to "Fox River Valley Gardens". Some people trying to sell their homes at the time found themselves "underwater" (selling at a loss). This prompted residents in the Riverwalk section of the village to express their objection to what appeared to be a "bait and switch" in the change of mailing address. There were several tense village meetings where legal action was being considered by the new residents.

In September 2002, the village board voted 4–3 to re-incorporate and change the community's name to "Port Barrington". However, several addresses in the older section of the village are still listed under the name Fox River Valley Gardens. In addition, many road signs and maps continue to use the community's original name, as do the local police and fire departments.

As of 2019, the post office is no longer in service, and mail delivery is provided by the postal service in Island Lake, Illinois.

== Geography ==
According to the 2021 census gazetteer files, Port Barrington has a total area of 1.32 square miles (3.42 km^{2}), of which 1.16 square miles (3.00 km^{2}) (or 87.88%) is land and 0.16 square miles (0.41 km^{2}) (or 12.12%) is water.

== Demographics ==
Historical population
Census	Pop.	Note	%±
1970	428		—
1980	520		21.5%
1990	665		27.9%
2000	788		18.5%
2010	1,517		92.5%
2020	1,584		4.4%
U.S. Decennial Census; 2010 2020

=== Racial and ethnic composition ===
Port Barrington village, Illinois – Racial and ethnic composition Note: the US Census treats Hispanic/Latino as an ethnic category. This table excludes Latinos from the racial categories and assigns them to a separate category. Hispanics/Latinos may be of any race.
Race / Ethnicity (NH = Non-Hispanic)	Pop 2000	Pop 2010	Pop 2020	% 2000	% 2010	% 2020
White alone (NH)	749	1,283	1,257	95.05%	84.57%	79.36%
Black or African American alone (NH)	4	17	17	0.51%	1.12%	1.07%
Native American or Alaska Native alone (NH)	0	0	2	0.00%	0.00%	0.13%
Asian alone (NH)	8	109	99	1.02%	7.19%	6.25%
Native Hawaiian or Pacific Islander alone (NH)	1	0	1	0.13%	0.00%	0.06%
Other race alone (NH)	0	0	5	0.00%	0.00%	0.32%
Mixed race or Multiracial (NH)	4	21	44	0.51%	1.38%	2.78%
Hispanic or Latino (any race)	22	87	159	2.79%	5.74%	10.04%
Total	788	1,517	1,584	100.00%	100.00%	100.00%

=== 2020 census ===
As of the 2020 census, Port Barrington had a population of 1,584.

The village had 472 families residing in it, and the population density was 1,200.00 inhabitants per square mile (463.32/km^{2}).

The median age was 42.1 years. 23.4% of residents were under the age of 18 and 11.9% of residents were 65 years of age or older. For every 100 females there were 108.4 males, and for every 100 females age 18 and over there were 106.1 males age 18 and over.

97.9% of residents lived in urban areas, while 2.1% lived in rural areas.

There were 558 households in Port Barrington, of which 41.4% had children under the age of 18 living in them. Of all households, 66.7% were married-couple households, 13.1% were households with a male householder and no spouse or partner present, and 13.3% were households with a female householder and no spouse or partner present. About 13.6% of all households were made up of individuals and 2.8% had someone living alone who was 65 years of age or older.

There were 583 housing units at an average density of 441.67 per square mile (170.53/km^{2}), of which 4.3% were vacant. The homeowner vacancy rate was 1.5% and the rental vacancy rate was 0.0%.

=== Income and poverty ===
The median income for a household in the village was $144,531, and the median income for a family was $143,125. Males had a median income of $78,214 versus $53,359 for females. The per capita income for the village was $55,859. About 0.6% of families and 1.6% of the population were below the poverty line, including 1.6% of those under age 18 and 3.1% of those age 65 or over.
