= Lake Barrington, Illinois =

- Village
- Flag Logo

- Location of Lake Barrington in Lake County, Illinois.
- Coordinates: 42°13′23″N 88°09′50″W=
- Country: United States
- State: Illinois
- County: Lake
- Townships: Cuba, Wauconda

Area
  - Total: 6.07 sq mi (15.71 km^{2})
  - Land: 5.74 sq mi (14.86 km^{2})
  - Water: 0.33 sq mi (0.86 km^{2})
- Elevation: 794 ft (242 m)

Population (2020)
  - Total: 5,100
  - Density: 889.1/sq mi (343.29/km^{2})
- Time zone: UTC-6 (CST)
  - Summer (DST): UTC-5 (CDT)
- ZIP code: 60010
- Area codes: 847 & 224
- FIPS code: 17-40884
- GNIS feature ID: 2398376
- Website: www.lakebarrington.org

Lake Barrington is a village in Lake County, Illinois, United States. Per the 2020 census, the population was 5,100.

== Geography ==
Lake Barrington is located on the shores of Lake Barrington, which was previously called Indian Lake.

According to the 2021 census gazetteer files, Lake Barrington has a total area of 6.07 square miles (15.72 km^{2}), of which 5.74 square miles (14.87 km^{2}) (or 94.56%) is land and 0.33 square miles (0.85 km^{2}) (or 5.44%) is water.

== Demographics ==
Historical population
| Census | Pop. | Note | %± |
|---|---|---|---|
| 1960 | 172 | | — |
| 1970 | 347 | | 101.7% |
| 1980 | 2,320 | | 568.6% |
| 1990 | 3,855 | | 66.2% |
| 2000 | 4,757 | | 23.4% |
| 2010 | 4,973 | | 4.5% |
| 2020 | 5,100 | | 2.6% |
U.S. Decennial Census; 2010 2020

=== Racial and ethnic composition ===
Lake Barrington village, Illinois – Racial and ethnic composition Note: the US Census treats Hispanic/Latino as an ethnic category. This table excludes Latinos from the racial categories and assigns them to a separate category. Hispanics/Latinos may be of any race.
| Race / Ethnicity (NH = Non-Hispanic) | Pop 2000 | Pop 2010 | Pop 2020 | % 2000 | % 2010 | % 2020 |
|---|---|---|---|---|---|---|
| White alone (NH) | 4,589 | 4,652 | 4,473 | 96.47% | 93.55% | 87.71% |
| Black or African American alone (NH) | 20 | 36 | 31 | 0.42% | 0.72% | 0.61% |
| Native American or Alaska Native alone (NH) | 9 | 4 | 4 | 0.19% | 0.08% | 0.08% |
| Asian alone (NH) | 51 | 125 | 234 | 1.07% | 2.51% | 4.59% |
| Native Hawaiian or Pacific Islander alone (NH) | 3 | 0 | 0 | 0.06% | 0.00% | 0.00% |
| Other race alone (NH) | 6 | 3 | 14 | 0.13% | 0.06% | 0.27% |
| Mixed race or Multiracial (NH) | 32 | 39 | 161 | 0.67% | 0.78% | 3.16% |
| Hispanic or Latino (any race) | 47 | 114 | 183 | 0.99% | 2.29% | 3.59% |
| Total | 4,757 | 4,973 | 5,100 | 100.00% | 100.00% | 100.00% |

=== 2020 census ===
As of the 2020 census, Lake Barrington had a population of 5,100. The population density was 840.75 inhabitants per square mile (324.62/km^{2}). The median age was 57.6 years. 16.4% of residents were under the age of 18 and 36.2% of residents were 65 years of age or older. For every 100 females there were 83.5 males, and for every 100 females age 18 and over there were 81.8 males age 18 and over.

88.6% of residents lived in urban areas, while 11.4% lived in rural areas.

There were 2,199 households in Lake Barrington, of which 20.5% had children under the age of 18 living in them. Of all households, 54.8% were married-couple households, 11.1% were households with a male householder and no spouse or partner present, and 30.5% were households with a female householder and no spouse or partner present. About 33.0% of all households were made up of individuals and 23.6% had someone living alone who was 65 years of age or older.

There were 2,402 housing units at an average density of 395.98 per square mile (152.89/km^{2}), of which 8.5% were vacant. The homeowner vacancy rate was 2.7% and the rental vacancy rate was 11.4%.

=== Income and poverty ===
The median income for a household in the village was $105,651, and the median income for a family was $144,539. Males had a median income of $89,861 versus $51,440 for females. The per capita income for the village was $64,561. About 4.0% of families and 5.3% of the population were below the poverty line, including 7.0% of those under age 18 and 3.6% of those age 65 or over.
