= Algonquin Township, Illinois =

- Township
- Seal

- Location in McHenry County
- Coordinates: 42°11′48″N 88°16′41″W
- Country: United States
- State: Illinois
- County: McHenry
- Established: November 6, 1849

Government
  - Supervisor: Randy Funk

Area
  - Total: 48.03 sq mi (124.4 km^{2})
  - Land: 46.42 sq mi (120.2 km^{2})
  - Water: 1.61 sq mi (4.2 km^{2}) 3.35%
- Elevation: 902 ft (275 m)

Population (2020)
  - Total: 87,633
  - Density: 1,904.2/sq mi (735.2/km^{2})
- Time zone: UTC-6 (CST)
  - Summer (DST): UTC-5 (CDT)
- Area codes: 815, 779, 847, 224
- FIPS code: 17-111-00698
- Website: www.algonquintownship.com

Algonquin Township is located in McHenry County, Illinois, with the township office in the city of Crystal Lake. As of the 2020 census, its population was 87,633 and it contained 33,960 housing units. It is the largest township by population in McHenry County.

== Geography ==
According to the 2010 census, the township has a total area of 48.03 square miles (124.4 km^{2}), of which 46.42 square miles (120.2 km^{2}) (or 96.65%) is land and 1.61 square miles (4.2 km^{2}) (or 3.35%) is water.

=== Cities, towns, villages ===
- Algonquin (mostly)
- Barrington Hills (small portion)
- Cary
- Crystal Lake (mostly)
- Fox River Grove (mostly)
- Lake in the Hills (half)
- Lakewood (small portion)
- Oakwood Hills (small portion)
- Port Barrington (western third)
- Trout Valley

== Demographics ==
Historical population
Census	Pop.	Note	%±
2010	88,389		—
2020	87,633		−0.9%
U.S. Decennial Census
