= North Barrington, Illinois =

- Village
- Location of North Barrington in Lake County, Illinois.
- Coordinates: 42°11′35″N 88°07′37″W
- Country: United States
- State: Illinois
- County: Lake

Area
  - Total: 4.98 sq mi (12.89 km^{2})
  - Land: 4.73 sq mi (12.24 km^{2})
  - Water: 0.25 sq mi (0.65 km^{2})
- Elevation: 797 ft (243 m)

Population (2020)
  - Total: 3,171
  - Density: 671.1/sq mi (259.12/km^{2})
- Time zone: UTC-6 (CST)
  - Summer (DST): UTC-5 (CDT)
- ZIP code: 60010
- Area code(s): 847, 224
- FIPS code: 17-53455
- GNIS feature ID: 2399510
- Website: www.northbarrington.org

North Barrington is a village in Lake County, Illinois, United States. Per the 2020 census, the population was 3,171.

== Geography ==
According to the 2021 census gazetteer files, North Barrington has a total area of 4.98 square miles (12.90 km^{2}), of which 4.73 square miles (12.25 km^{2}) (or 94.96%) is land and 0.25 square miles (0.65 km^{2}) (or 5.04%) is water.

== Neighborhoods ==
There are a few neighborhoods in North Barrington, three of which are Biltmore, Oaksbury, and Wynstone.

== Education ==
Most of North Barrington is served by North Barrington Elementary School. It is the only public school inside the village. Barrington Middle School Station or Prairie Campus both serve the village as well and some is also served by Roslyn Road Elementary School. All of these schools feed into Barrington High School. Some of the village is also served by Seth Paine Elementary School, Lake Zurich Middle School North and Lake Zurich High School.

== Demographics ==
Historical population
Census	Pop.	Note	%±
1960	282		—
1970	1,411		400.4%
1980	1,475		4.5%
1990	1,787		21.2%
2000	2,918		63.3%
2010	3,047		4.4%
2020	3,171		4.1%
U.S. Decennial Census; 2010 2020

=== Racial and ethnic composition ===
North Barrington village, Illinois – Racial and ethnic composition Note: the US Census treats Hispanic/Latino as an ethnic category. This table excludes Latinos from the racial categories and assigns them to a separate category. Hispanics/Latinos may be of any race.
Race / Ethnicity (NH = Non-Hispanic)	Pop 2000	Pop 2010	Pop 2020	% 2000	% 2010	% 2020
White alone (NH)	2,769	2,793	2,703	94.89%	91.66%	85.24%
Black or African American alone (NH)	14	16	28	0.48%	0.53%	0.88%
Native American or Alaska Native alone (NH)	0	0	5	0.00%	0.00%	0.16%
Asian alone (NH)	46	118	199	1.58%	3.87%	6.28%
Native Hawaiian or Pacific Islander alone (NH)	1	0	0	0.03%	0.00%	0.00%
Other race alone (NH)	4	10	14	0.14%	0.33%	0.44%
Mixed race or Multiracial (NH)	13	38	109	0.45%	1.25%	3.44%
Hispanic or Latino (any race)	71	72	113	2.43%	2.36%	3.56%
Total	2,918	3,047	3,171	100.00%	100.00%	100.00%

=== 2020 census ===
As of the 2020 census, North Barrington had a population of 3,171. The median age was 48.7 years. 22.6% of residents were under the age of 18 and 20.8% were 65 years of age or older. For every 100 females, there were 101.7 males, and for every 100 females age 18 and over there were 99.6 males age 18 and over.

93.9% of residents lived in urban areas, while 6.1% lived in rural areas.

There were 1,140 households, of which 33.7% had children under the age of 18 living in them. Of all households, 73.4% were married-couple households, 9.2% were households with a male householder and no spouse or partner present, and 12.5% were households with a female householder and no spouse or partner present. About 12.6% of all households were made up of individuals and 6.5% had someone living alone who was 65 years of age or older.

There were 1,181 housing units, with an average density of 237.34 per square mile (91.64/km^{2}). The population density was 637.26 inhabitants per square mile (246.05/km^{2}). Of the housing units, 3.5% were vacant. The homeowner vacancy rate was 1.0% and the rental vacancy rate was 0.0%.

=== Income and poverty ===
The median income for a household in the village was $197,188, and the median income for a family was $210,521. Males had a median income of $151,563 versus $81,979 for females. The per capita income for the village was $97,794. About 2.3% of families and 4.9% of the population were below the poverty line, including 2.9% of those under age 18 and 7.0% of those age 65 or over.

== Notable people ==
- Peter DiFronzo (1933–2020), mobster (Chicago Outfit)
- Lane Hutson (b. 2004), professional hockey player and NHL Calder Cup winner.
- Quinn Hutson (b. 2002), professional hockey player.
- Brent Sherman (b. 1974), racing driver.
- Joe Walsh (b. 1961), radio host and former Representative for Illinois' 8th congressional district.
