= Wauconda =

Wauconda may refer to:

- Wauconda, Illinois, a village in Lake County, Illinois, U.S.
  - Wauconda Area Library, a library serving the village and surrounding areas
  - Wauconda Bog Nature Preserve, a tamarack bog and a National Natural Landmark located here
  - Wauconda Community Unit School District 118, a school district serving the village and surrounding areas
  - Wauconda High School, a public four-year high school located here
  - Wauconda Township, Lake County, Illinois, a township which includes the village of Wauconda
- Wauconda, Washington, an unincorporated community in Okanogan County, Washington, U.S.
  - Wauconda Pass, a high mountain pass in the Cascades in the state of Washington

== See also ==
- Wakanda (disambiguation)
