= Wakanda (disambiguation) =

Wakanda is a fictional country in the Marvel Universe.

Wakanda may also refer to:

- Wakandas, a fictional African people in Edgar Rice Burroughs' 1915 novel The Man-Eater
- Wakanda, a cognate term of Wakan Tanka, translated as the "Great Spirit" and occasionally as "Great Mystery" in Lakota spirituality among indigenous North American peoples
- Wakanda, a minor character in the book Harry Potter and the Deathly Hallows (2007)
- Wakanda, a park in Menomonie, Wisconsin

== See also ==
- Great Spirit (disambiguation)
- Wauconda (disambiguation)
- Wyaconda (disambiguation)
- Wakonda (disambiguation)
