= Bangs Lake =

Natural lake located in Illinois

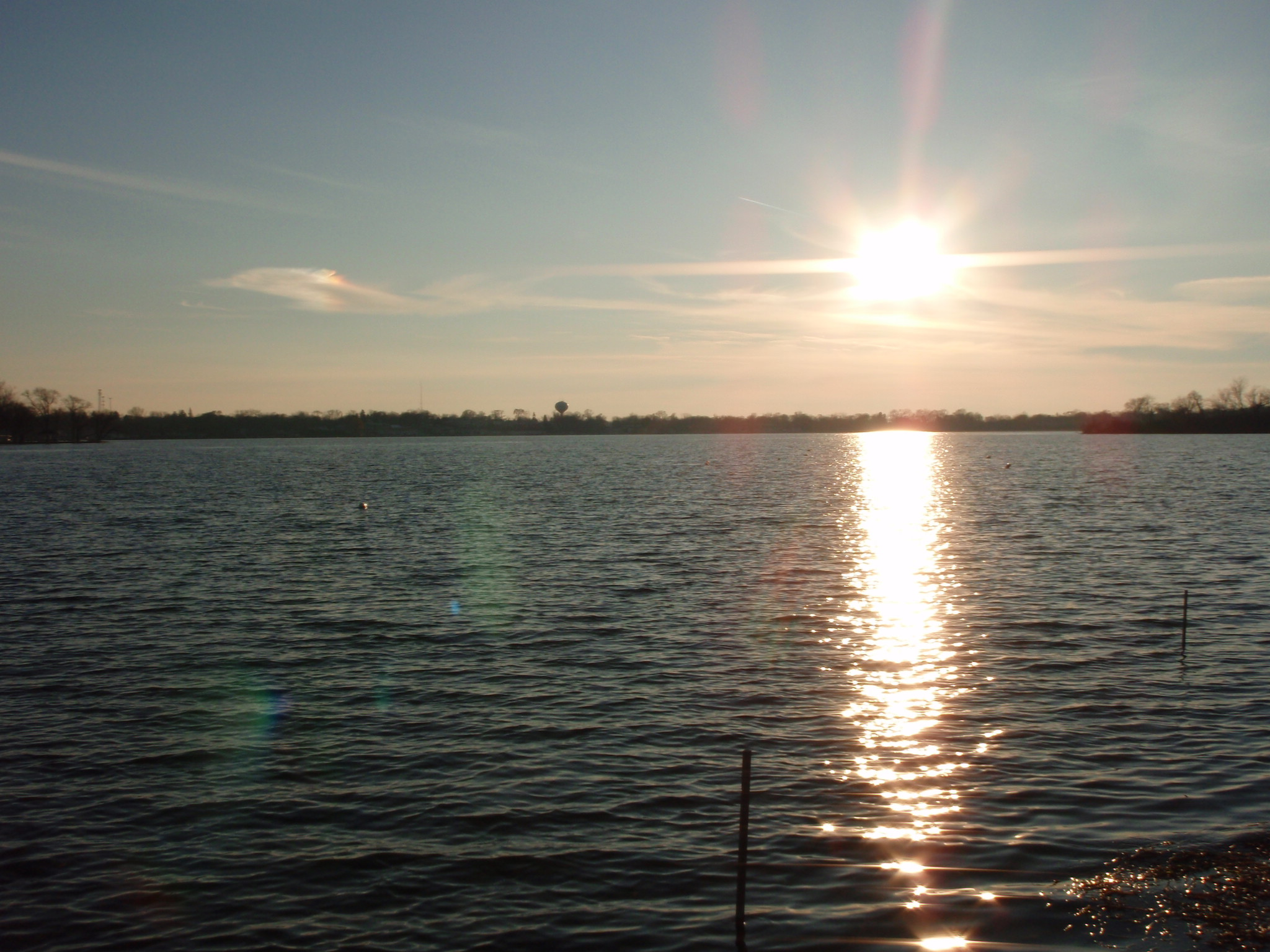
- from the Northeast shore

- Location within Illinois Location within the United States
- Location: Wauconda, Illinois
- Coordinates: 42°15′56″N 88°07′59″W
- Type: glacial
- Basin countries: United States
- Max. depth: 32 ft (9.8 m)
- Shore length^{1}: 6.3 mi (10.1 km)
- Surface elevation: 774 ft (236 m)
- ^{1} Shore length is not a well-defined measure.

Bangs Lake is a natural glacial lake that is located in Wauconda, Illinois. It is named after Justus Bangs, the first permanent settler in Wauconda, who arrived in the summer of 1836. Justus Bangs reportedly named Wauconda as well, supposedly after a Native American Indian character in a story Bangs had read. However, some believe that Wauconda was named after an Indian chief who is buried on the southern shore of Bangs Lake.

In the early 1900s, the Palatine, Lake Zurich and Wauconda Railroad brought vacationers to Wauconda from Chicago, and the beaches of Bangs Lake continued to be a popular vacation destination through the 1960s. In the 1980 film The Blues Brothers, beach scenes were filmed along the shores of Bangs Lake.

== Activities ==
Bangs Lake hosts many activities including swimming, boating, skiing and fishing during the summer months. The lake is home to such species as bluegill, channel catfish, largemouth bass, northern pike and yellow perch. The Bangs Lake Multisport Festival is scheduled for August 2010 and has three different distances including an Olympic Triathlon, Duathlon, and Aquabike.

The winter months bring ice skating and ice fishing to the lake. The Walk on Water Charity Ice Fishing Derby will take place for its seventh year in February 2011. This is an ice fishing event that helps raise funds for the Andrea Lynn Cancer Fund.
