= Plz =

Plz or PLZ may refer to:

- Plz, "please" in texting shorthand
- Postleitzahl or PLZ, postal-code abbreviation in German-speaking countries
- PLZ, the old (1950–1994) ISO 4217 code for the Polish złoty
- PLZ, IATA airport code for Port Elizabeth Airport in Eastern Cape, South Africa
- plz, the ISO 639-3 code for the Paluan language
- PLZ, a London rap group that helped launch Reggie Rockstone's career
- PLZ, ICAO code for Planet Airways, an American airline 1995–2005

== See also ==
- PLZ&W, an American short-line railroad
