= List of surviving Messerschmitt Bf 109s =

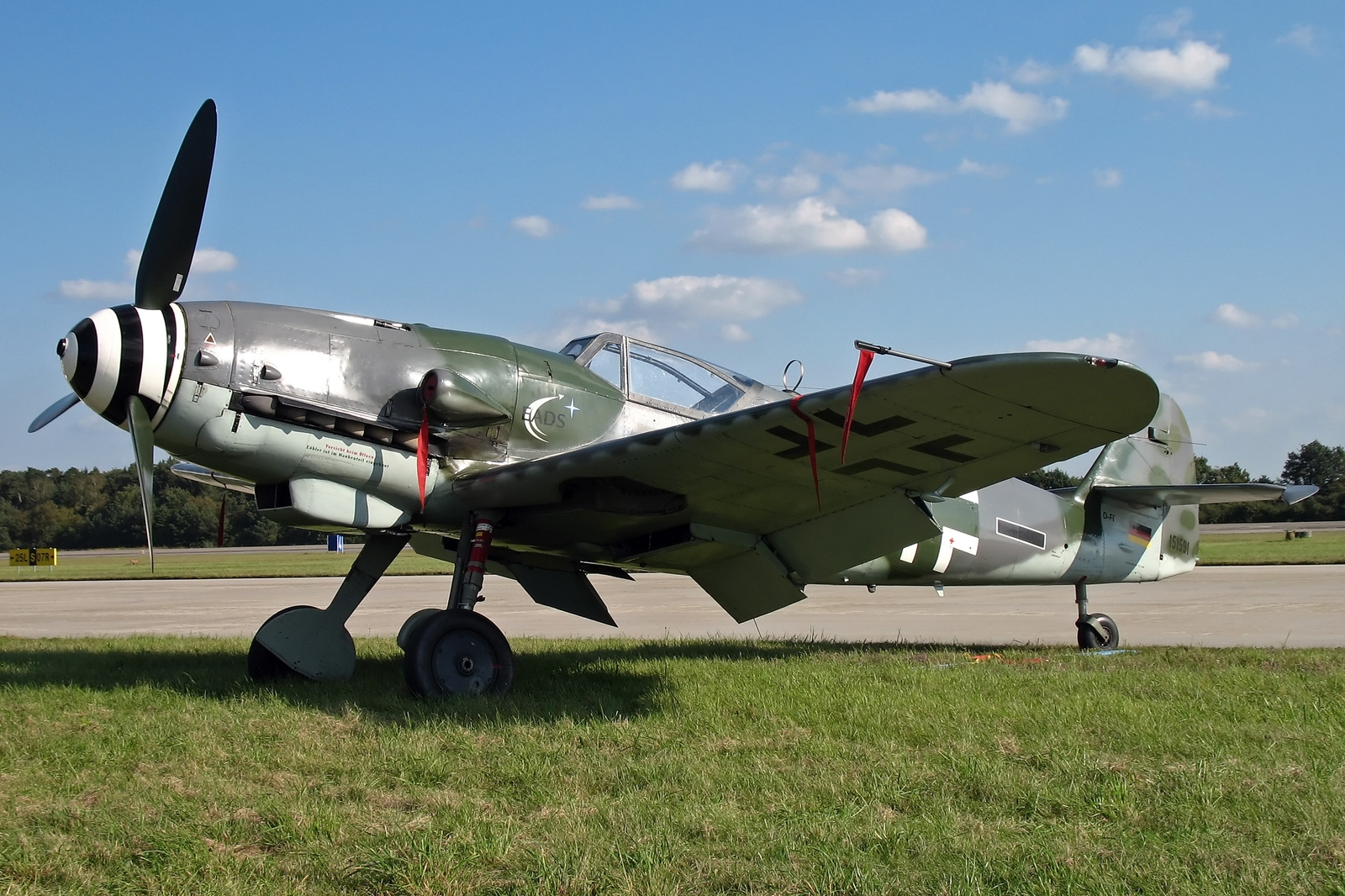
Bf 109G-10 Black 2 + - of the Messerschmitt Museum

The Messerschmitt Bf 109 is a German World War II fighter aircraft. It was one of the first true modern fighters of the era, including such features as an all-metal monocoque construction, a closed canopy, and retractable landing gear. The Bf 109 was the most produced fighter aircraft during World War II, with 30,573 examples built during the war, and the most produced fighter aircraft in history, with a total of 33,984 units produced up to April 1945.

Spain had signed licensing agreements with Messerschmitt in 1942 to produce the Bf 109G-2 and had received tooling and jigs in preparation for starting production, as well as 25 uncompleted fuselage and wing assemblies. Due to priority to the Luftwaffe, Messerschmitt was unable to oversee the start-up of the production line. In addition, Hispano Aviación was also unable to acquire the Daimler-Benz DB 605 engines due to wartime shortages. It was not until 1947 that the factory started to produce complete airframes. As a replacement engine comparable to the DB 605A the Hispano-Suiza 12Z-17 was fitted to these aircraft. Aircraft with this engine were designated HA-1109-K1L (65 being produced). In 1954 Hispano Aviación re-engineered the airframe to accept the Rolls-Royce Merlin 500-45 and produced the HA-1112-M1L. Production of the Hispano Aviación HA-1109 and HA-1112 Buchon ended in 1958; however, Spain continued to use the HA-1112 operationally until late 1967.

In 1946 Czechoslovakia restarted the closed Messerschmitt production line at the Avia Company (a division of the Škoda Works) in Prague using the original jigs and tooling along with a substantial number of uncompleted airframes. From 1946 to 1949 about 550 airframes were completed as Avia S-99s, resembling a Bf 109G-14, and Avia S-199s (Jumo engine, otherwise unchanged). Due to a fire in a warehouse a substantial number of DB 605 engines were lost and as a substitute the Junkers Jumo 211 was found in substantial quantity. Unlike either the original DB 605 or the Rolls-Royce Merlin, the torque of this substitute engine was extremely high resulting in a high fatality rate from these aircraft. Production ended in 1948, and the Czechoslovak National Security Guard retired the last of the S-199s in 1957.

Post war, in addition to the Spanish and Czechoslovak Air Forces, both Finland and Switzerland continued to use the Bf 109 operationally until the late 1950s. The then-new nation of Israel purchased 25 Avia S-199s (23 delivered) when, due to being embargoed, it was unable to acquire aircraft from other sources. The Israel Air Force retired its aircraft in early 1949.

Between 1945 and 1948, most Bf 109s were scrapped or destroyed. Some examples were kept for use as war trophies or technical examples for further studies. For the next 23 years, these were the first generation of Bf 109 survivors.

In 1967, the producers of the movie The Battle of Britain wanted a large and accurate group of aircraft for use onscreen. Fortunately, the Spanish Air Force was starting to retire its HA-1112s and an agreement was reached to use these aircraft. The Commemorative Air Force had also just purchased numerous examples of the HA-1112. These aircraft were also leased for the production of this movie. For the next 35 years, these Spanish Bf 109s were the mainstay for numerous World War II aviation movies and television work, including Hanover Street, Memphis Belle, The Tuskegee Airmen and Piece of Cake to name but a few.

Starting in late 1988, Bf 109s were among numerous crashed examples of World War II aircraft still extant in Russia that were being recovered for restoration. Other examples of the early models of the Bf 109 have been found in crash sites in France and Italy (as well as several aircraft recovered where they had been buried in Germany). These aircraft with known combat histories are the foundation of the current wave of recovered/restored Bf 109s with further discoveries anticipated. As of December 2016 there are 67 known existing Bf 109 airframes.

About twenty of the surviving Bf 109s existent in the 21st century served at one time with the Luftwaffe fighter wing Jagdgeschwader 5, more than with any other Axis military aviation unit of World War II.

== Surviving aircraft ==
=== Australia ===
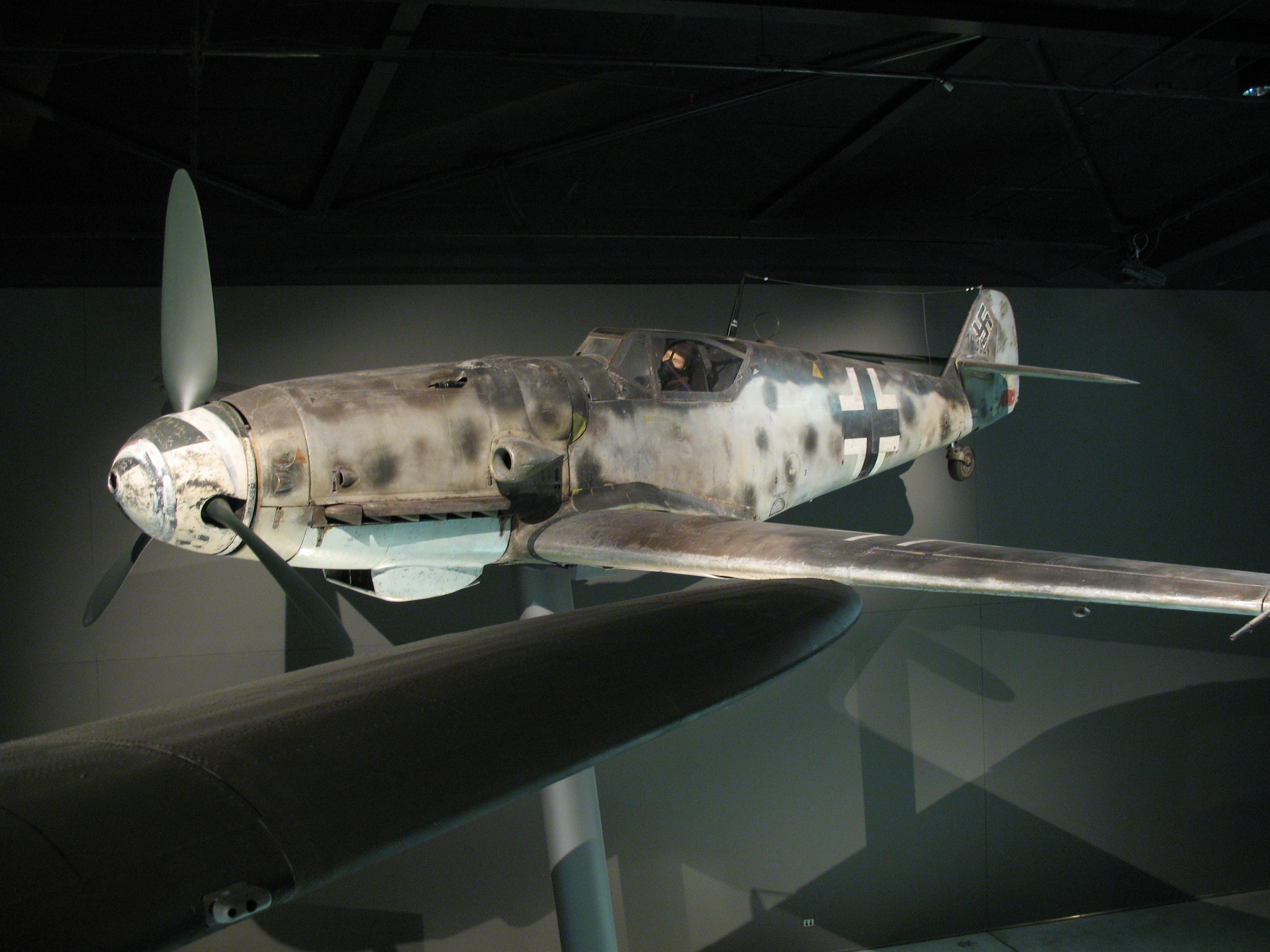
Bf 109 G-6/U4 in the Australian War Memorial, Canberra

On display

- Bf 109 G-6/U4 163824 NF + FY; Luftwaffe unit unknown. Held by the Australian War Memorial (AWM), Canberra. The last Bf 109 in the world still displaying its original camouflage and markings: a 1944 day-fighter scheme, with variations resulting from service repairs (possibly including its Erla Haube canopy) and replacements (e.g. one wing was replaced). Ex-post-war UK registration of G-SMIT, 163824 has twice been owned by the AWM: according to historian Michael Nelmes, the AWM disposed of it for £100 in 1963, to a member of the Illawarra Flying Club at Bankstown Airport in Sydney. It was later acquired by collector Sid Marshall, who had the aircraft suspended from the ceiling of his personal hangar. In 1979, an Australian owner of 163824 attempted to export it, for a reputed price of $10,000, to British collector Doug Arnold. However, any such export would have been illegal under Australian law and the aircraft was confiscated by Australian Customs and subsequently re-acquired by the AWM. It has been claimed that the seller temporarily covered the Bf 109 in a silver plastic protective film, supposedly in attempt to pass it off as a P-51 Mustang.

Under restoration/stored

- Bf 109 G-2 14798 GJ+QP, ex 8./JG 5 "Black 10"; Wayne Dawson New South Wales.

=== Austria ===
On display

- Bf 109 G-14 784993 ex-IV./JG 53 "White 13", White 13, Aviaticum Wiener Neustadt.

=== Belgium ===
Airworthy

- HA-1112-M1L c/n 201 C.4K-131 (OO-MAF), movie: Battle of Britain, ex-Victory Air Museum", White 1 Sabine, Eric Vormezeele Collection, Brasschaat.

=== Brazil ===
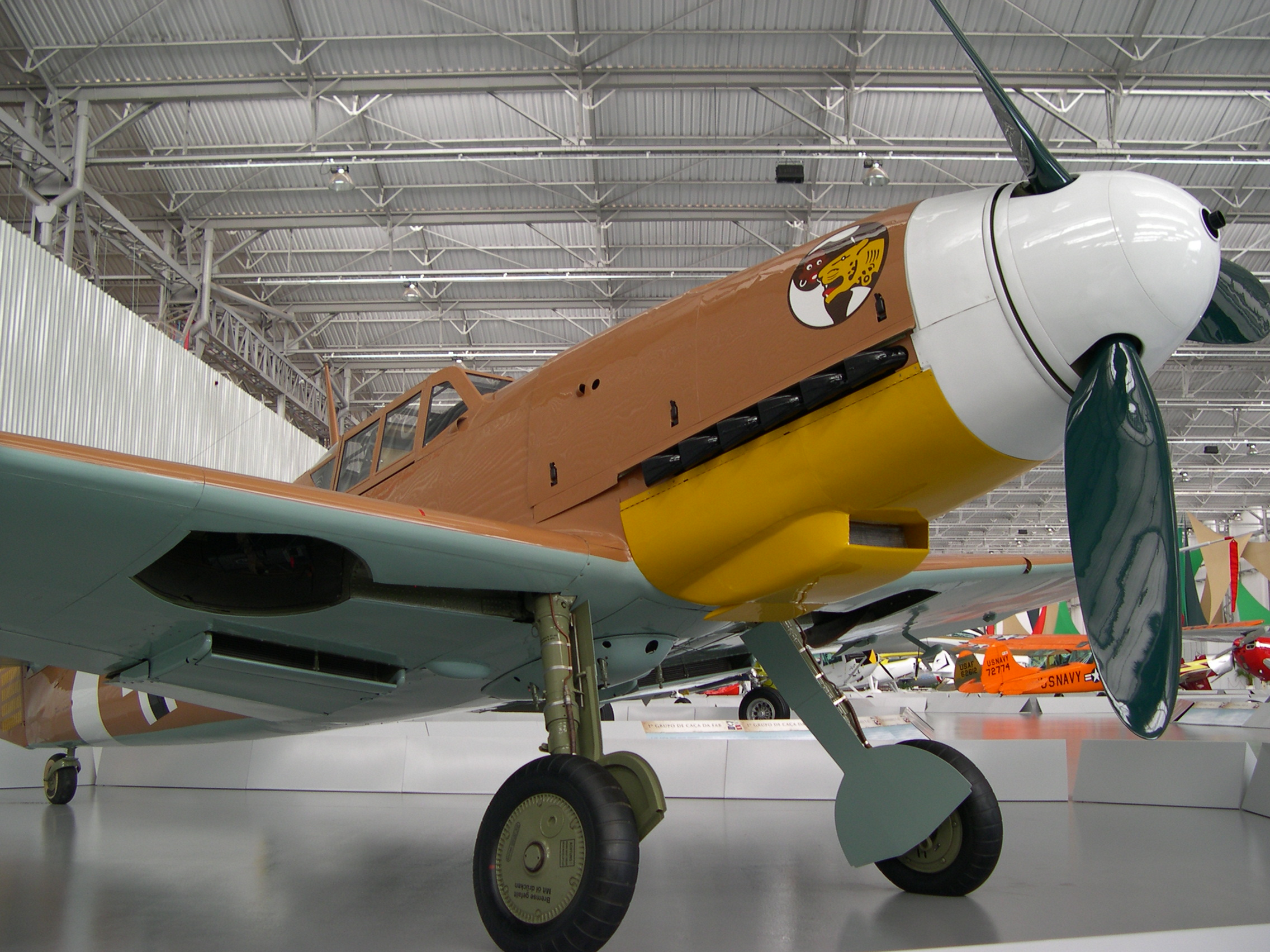
Bf 109 G-2 Yellow 14 in the TAM Museum, Brazil

On display

- Bf 109 G-2, 14256, Yellow 14, Museu Aeroespacial Paulista, Campo de Marte Airport, São Paulo.

=== Canada ===
On display

- Bf 109 F-4 10132, <<, Canada Aviation and Space Museum, Rockcliffe, Ontario.

=== Czech Republic ===
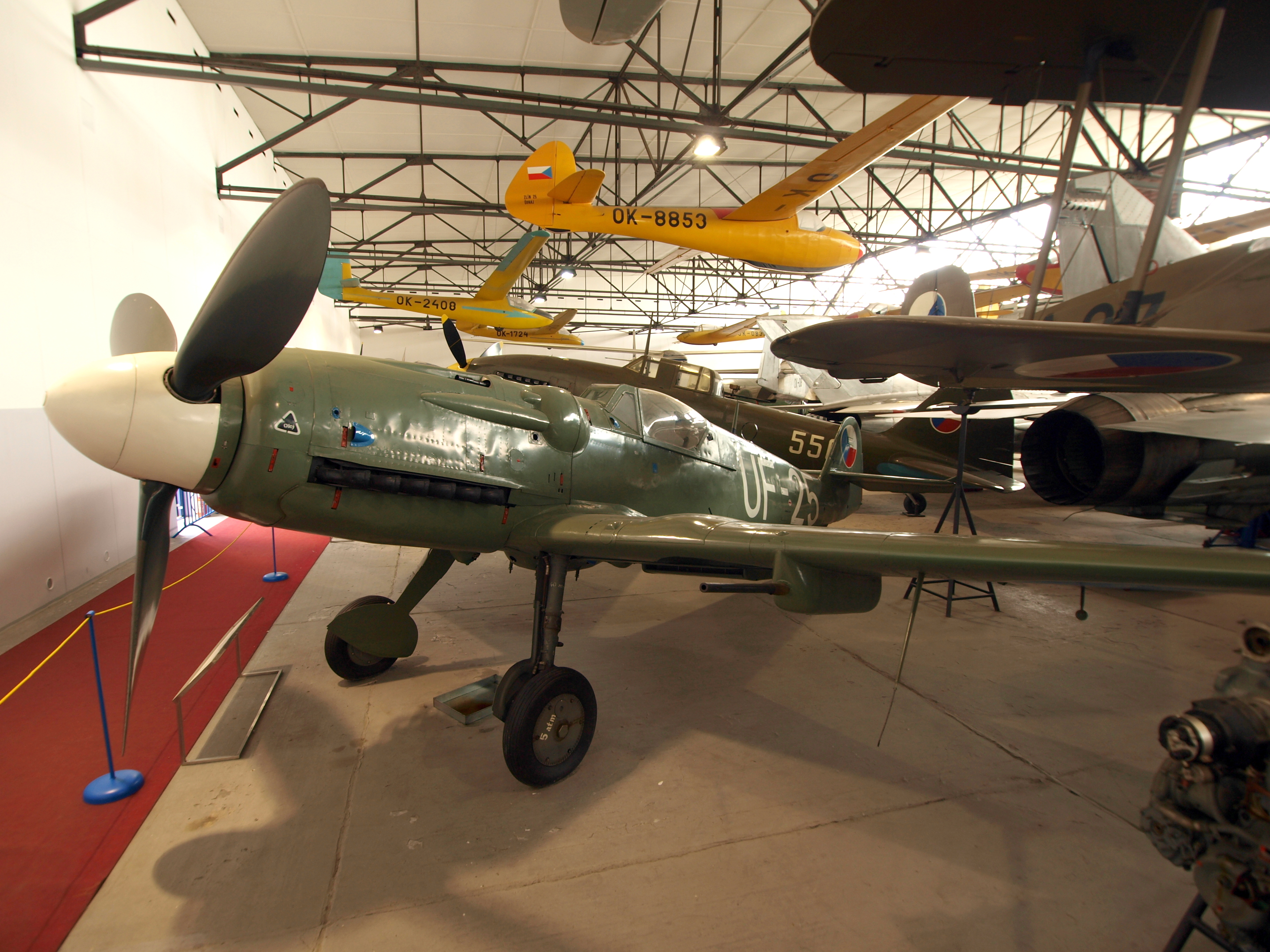
Avia S-199 with Czechoslovak markings

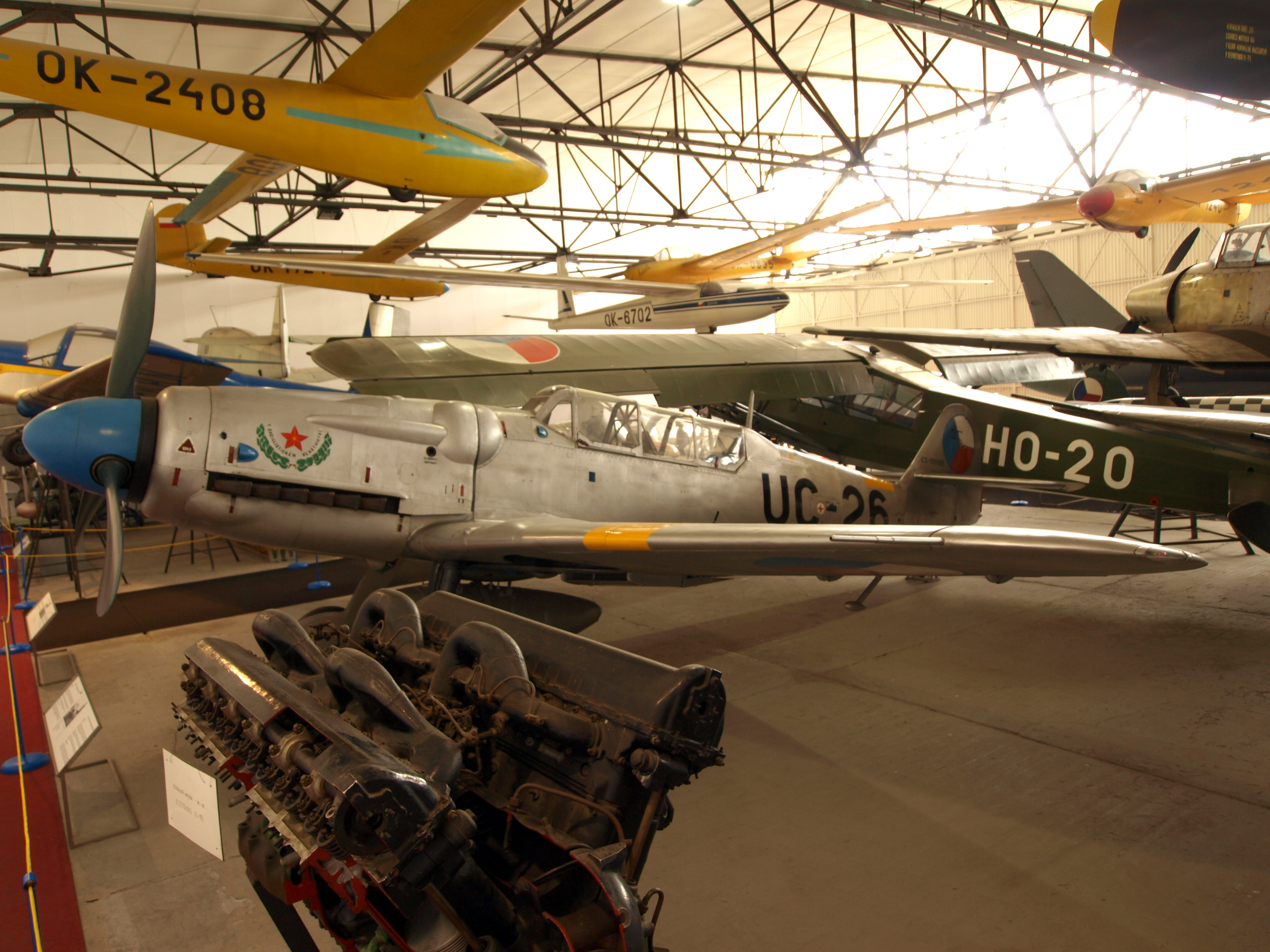
Avia CS-199; Letecké muzeum Kbely

On display

- S-199 199178, UC-25, Aviation Museum - Kbely, Prague.
- CS-199 199565, UC-26, Aviation Museum - Kbely, Prague.

=== Finland ===
On display

- Bf 109 F-4 7108, ex-NE + ML, ex-9./JG 5, Finnish Air Force Museum, Tikkakoski.
- Bf 109 G-2 14743, ex-RJ + SM, ex-Finnish AF MT-208, Finnish Aviation Museum, Helsinki-Vantaa Airport.
- Bf 109 G-6/U2 165227, ex-BV + UE, ex-Finnish AF MT-452 "Yellow 4", Yellow 4, Suomen Ilmailumuseo, Utti.
- Bf 109 G-6/Y 167271, ex-VO + GI, ex-Finnish AF MT-507 "Yellow 0", Yellow 0 , Central Finland Aviation Museum (FAM), Tikkakoski.

Stored or under restoration

- Bf 109 E-3 3285, ex-Bf 109E-7, ex-4./JG 5 "Black 12", "White 4", "Yellow 2", Finnish AF Museum, Tikkakoski.

=== France ===
Stored or under restoration

- Bf 109 G-6 26129 ex-RV + IS, ex-II./JG 54 "Black 3", Aéronautique Provençale.

=== Germany ===
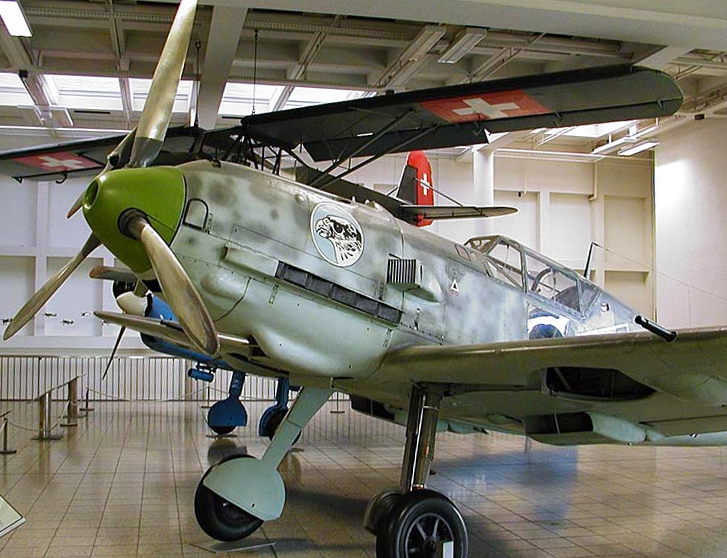
Bf 109 E-3 790

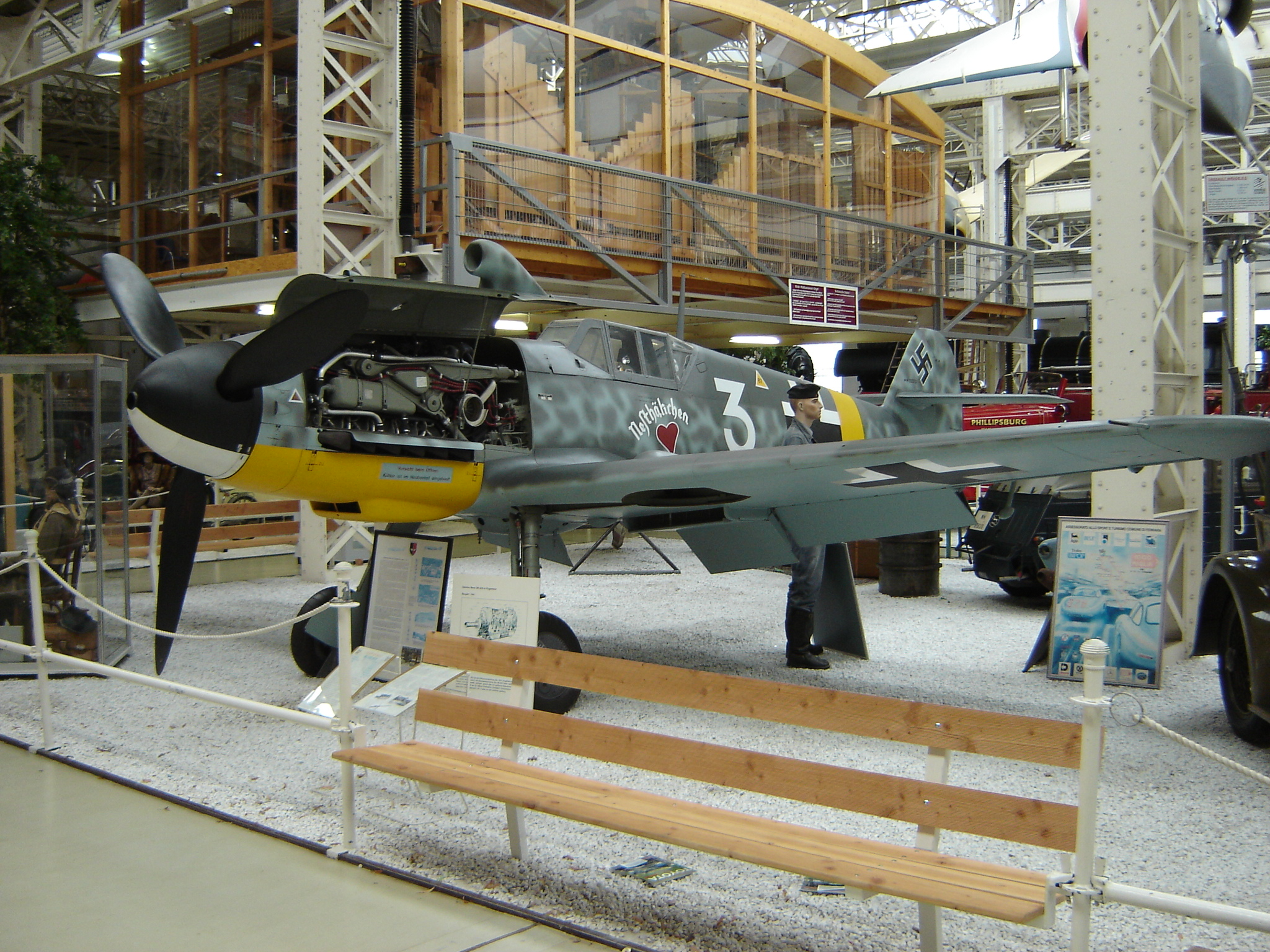
Bf 109 G-4 19310 White 3 at the Technikmuseum Speyer

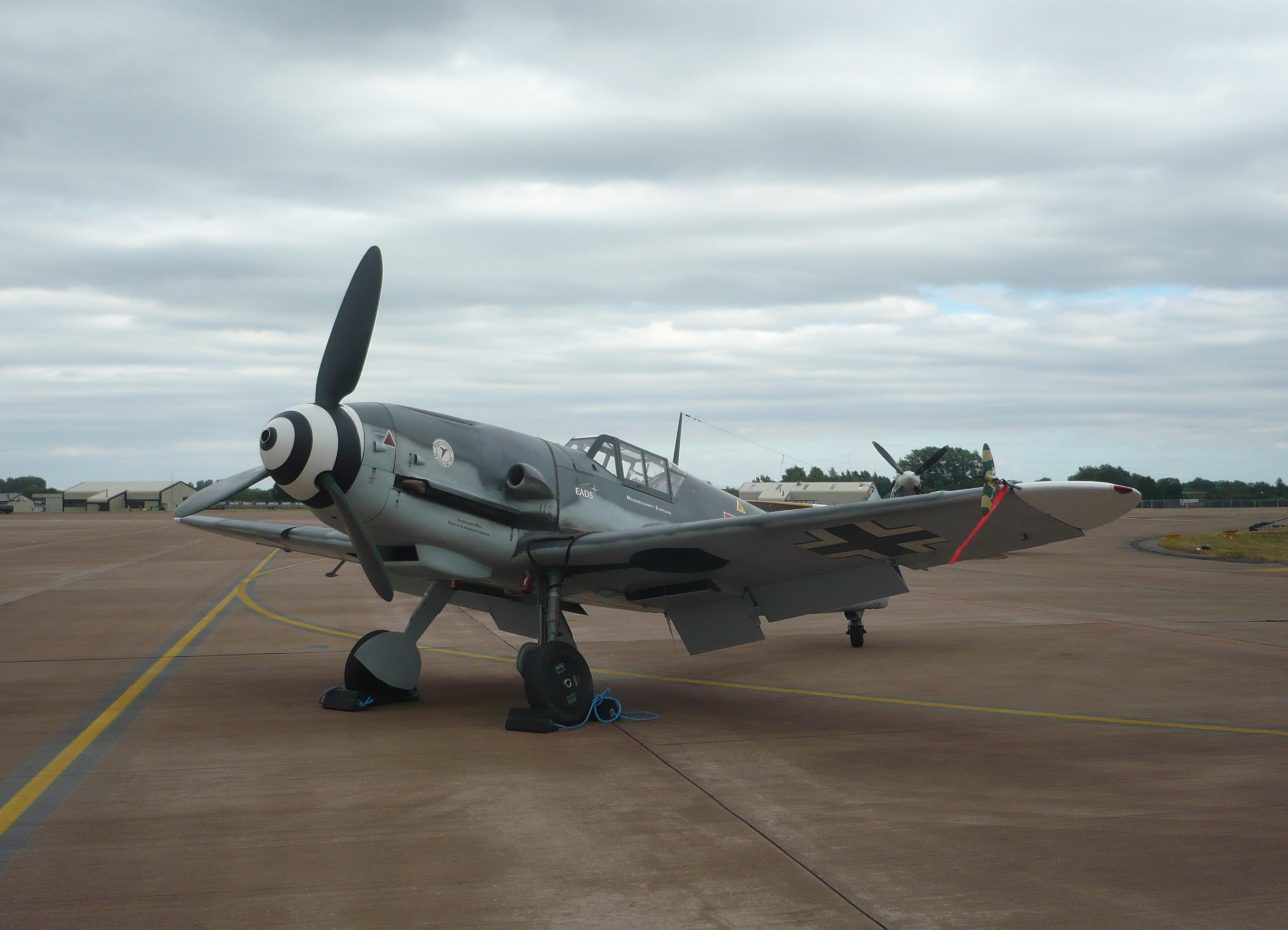
D-FWME (red 7) Force landed in a corn field on August 18th 2013 during an airshow display at Roskilde Airport, Denmark. The pilot was unharmed, and the aircraft sustained minor damage, including a completely broken propeller. Red 7 is now back to flying condition, a Bf 109 G-4, at RIAT 2010.

Airworthy

- Bf 109 E-4/N 1983 (D-FEML), ex-Bf 109 E-7, ex-5./JG 5 "Red 12", Wolfgang Landschulze near Bonn, Bonn/Hangelar Airfield.
- HA-1112-M1L c/n 139 C4K-75 (D-FWME), movie: Battle of Britain "Yellow 11", Red 7 + - , Messerschmitt Air Company. Belly landed in a corn field on August 18, 2013, during an airshow display at Roskilde Airport, Denmark. The pilot was unharmed, and the aircraft sustained only minor damage, including a completely broken propeller. Re-engined with DB605.
- HA-1112-M1L c/n 156 C.4K-87 (D-FMBB), FM+BB, EADS / Messerschmitt Foundation, rebuilt with a DB605 engine.
- HA-1112-M1L c/n 234 C.4K-169 (D-FMGZ), Yellow 27, Hangar 10 Air Fighter Collection GmbH. Restored to Bf 109 G-12 (two-seat trainer) status with DB605.
- HA-1112-M1L c/n 235 C.4K-172 (D-FMVS), movie: Battle of Britain, ex-Victory Air Museum, <- + - , Cavanaugh Flight Museum, Addison, Texas. Hangar 10 Air Fighter Collection GmbH.

On display

- Bf 109 E-1 790 - earliest surviving 109 to have seen combat - ex-J/88/2 (Condor Legion) "6-106", ex-Bf 109 E-3, ex-Spanish AF "C4E-106", <- + - ,/ Deutsches Museum, Munich.
- Bf 109 E-3 1407, ex-2./JG 77 "Black 2", ex-Bf 109E-4, ex-14/JG 77 "Red 5", Red 5 , Deutsches Technikmuseum, Berlin.
- Bf 109 G-2 trop 14753, ex-1./JG 27 "White 3", White 3, Aviation Museum Hannover-Laatzen.
- Bf 109 G-4 19310, ex-BH + XN, ex-4./JG 52 "White 3" "Nesthäkchen" - crashed 20 March 1943, White 3, Technikmuseum Speyer.
- HA-1109-K1L C.4J-??, <<< Yellow 4 Luftwaffen Museum, Gatow, rebuilt as Bf 109G-2 with DB605
- HA-1109-K1L c/n 54 C.4J-??, Messerschmitt Museum, Manching.
- HA-1112-M1L c/n 194 C.4K-134, movie: Battle of Britain, ex-Victory Air Museum, On limited display at Wittmundhafen AB, marked as Black 12, has been rebuilt with DB 605 engine.
- HA-1112-M1L c/n 228 C.4K-170 (N170BG), movie: Battle of Britain "Yellow <", movie: Patton (as P-51B) "743652", Yellow 4 + -, Auto und Technik Museum, Sinsheim, has been rebuilt with DB605 engine.
- HA-1112-M1L c/n 213 C.4K-1?? (D-FEHD), Black 15, Messerschmitt Foundation.

Stored or under restoration

- Bf 109B/V10a 1010 (D-IAKO), Oberschleißheim, Munich — only surviving Bf 109 prototype airframe known to exist.
- Bf 109 F-2 8993, ex GC + KQ, ex-2./JG 3, ex-Bf 109F-4, ex-JG 54 "White 2", ex-9/III JG 5 "Yellow 3" (pilot Obgfr. Eugen Britz) - crashed 3 April 1943, Yellow 3.
- Bf 109 G-2 13605 (G-JIMP), Yellow 12 registered to Mark R. Oliver, Altrincham, UK.
- Bf 109 G-10 w/n unknown (D-FDME), Black 2 + - , EADS / Messerschmitt Foundation. This aircraft is widely regarded to be an HA-1112-M1L rebuilt as a Bf 109 G-10. It has since been repainted as Yellow 3 + -.

=== Israel ===
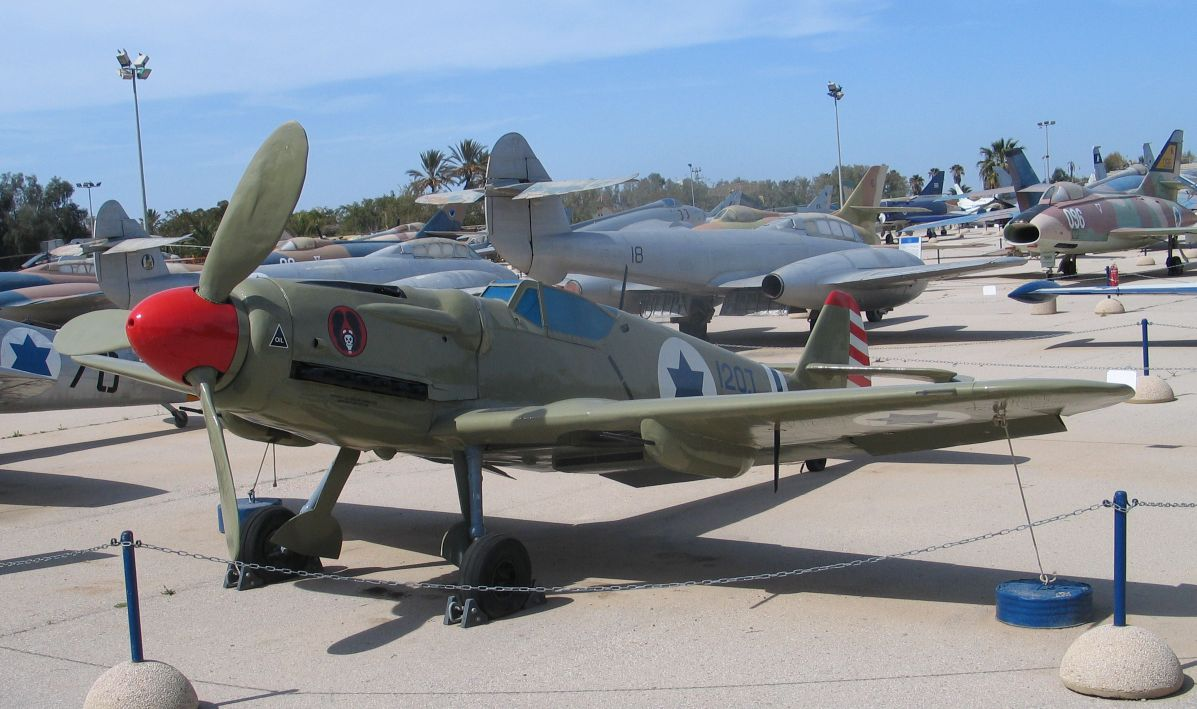
S-199 782358 IAFM

On display

- S-199 782358, ex-Israel AF, D 112 Israeli Air Force Museum, Hatzerim Air Force Base.

=== Netherlands ===
On display

- Bf 109 G-5 15343, ex-5./JG 53 "Black 11", Black 11 , Vliegend Museum Seppe, Breda Airport.
- Bf 109 G-6 15678 ex-9./JG 54 "Brown 7"- crashed Jul 1943, fuselage only at the Atlantic Wall Museum.

=== New Zealand ===
Under restoration/stored

- Bf 109 G, sub type and w/n as yet unknown. Believed to have previously been in Australia, it was understood to be imported for a private owner who intends to restore it to airworthy.

=== Norway ===
Stored or under restoration

- Bf 109 G-2/R1 13470, ex-CI + KS, ex-8./JG 5 "White 4", Norwegian Aviation Museum, Bodø.
- Bf 109 G-1 14055, NI + BY, ex-1./JG 5 "White 3", Flyhistorisk Museum, Sola.
- Bf 109 G-2 14649, Stab IV/JG 5, "Yellow 3", Norwegian Aviation Museum, Bodø.

=== Poland ===
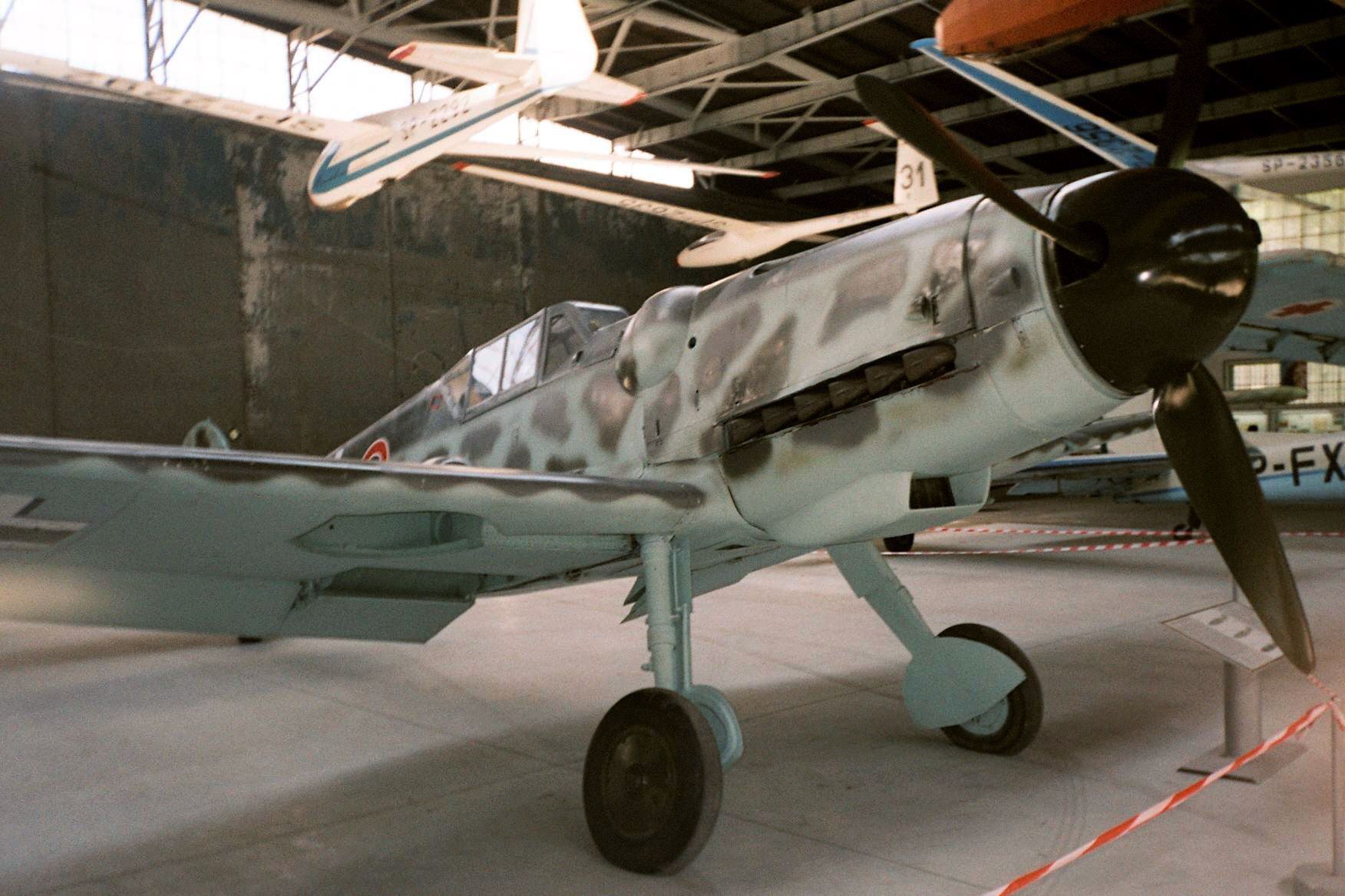
Bf 109 G-6 163306 Red 3 at Fundacja Polskie Orły

On Display

- Bf 109 G-6 163306, ex-RQ + DR, ex-JGr. West "Red 3" - crashed 28 May 1944, Red 3, Fundacja Polskie Orły, Warszawa.
- Bf 109 E-3 1185, ex-Bf 109 E-6, Muzeum Lotnictwa Polskiego, Kraków.

=== Russia ===
On display

- Bf 109 G-2 14658, ex-KG-WF, ex-6./JG 5 "Yellow 2", Museum of the Air Forces of the Northern Fleet, Severomorsk.
- Bf 109 G-6 411768 ex-FN + RX, ex-RW + ZI, ex-II./JG 5 "Black 1", Black 1 , Vadim Zadorozny Technical Museum, Moscow.

Stored or under restoration

- Bf 109 F-4/Z 7504, ex-7./JG 3 "White 10 + |" (pilot Fw. Rudolf Berg) - crashed 28 March 1943.
- Bf 109 G-2 13427, ex-9./JG 5 "Yellow 2", Russia (S).

=== Serbia ===
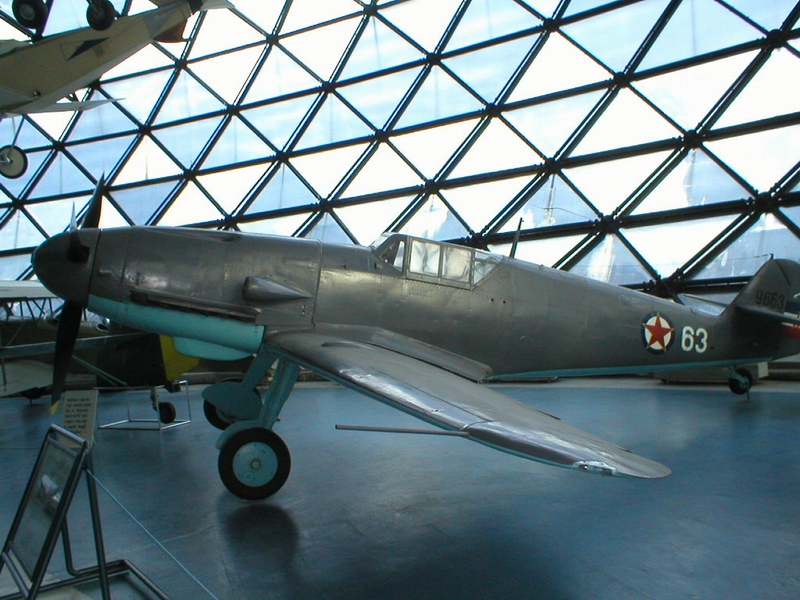
Bf 109 G-2 14792 at the Yugoslavian Aviation Museum

On display

- Bf 109 G-2 14792, ex-GJ + QJ, ex-Yugoslavian AF 9663 "63", 63 , Yugoslavian Aviation Museum, Belgrade.

=== Slovakia ===
- Bf 109 G-14/AS 784993, Aviation Museum Kosice, Slovakia.

=== South Africa ===
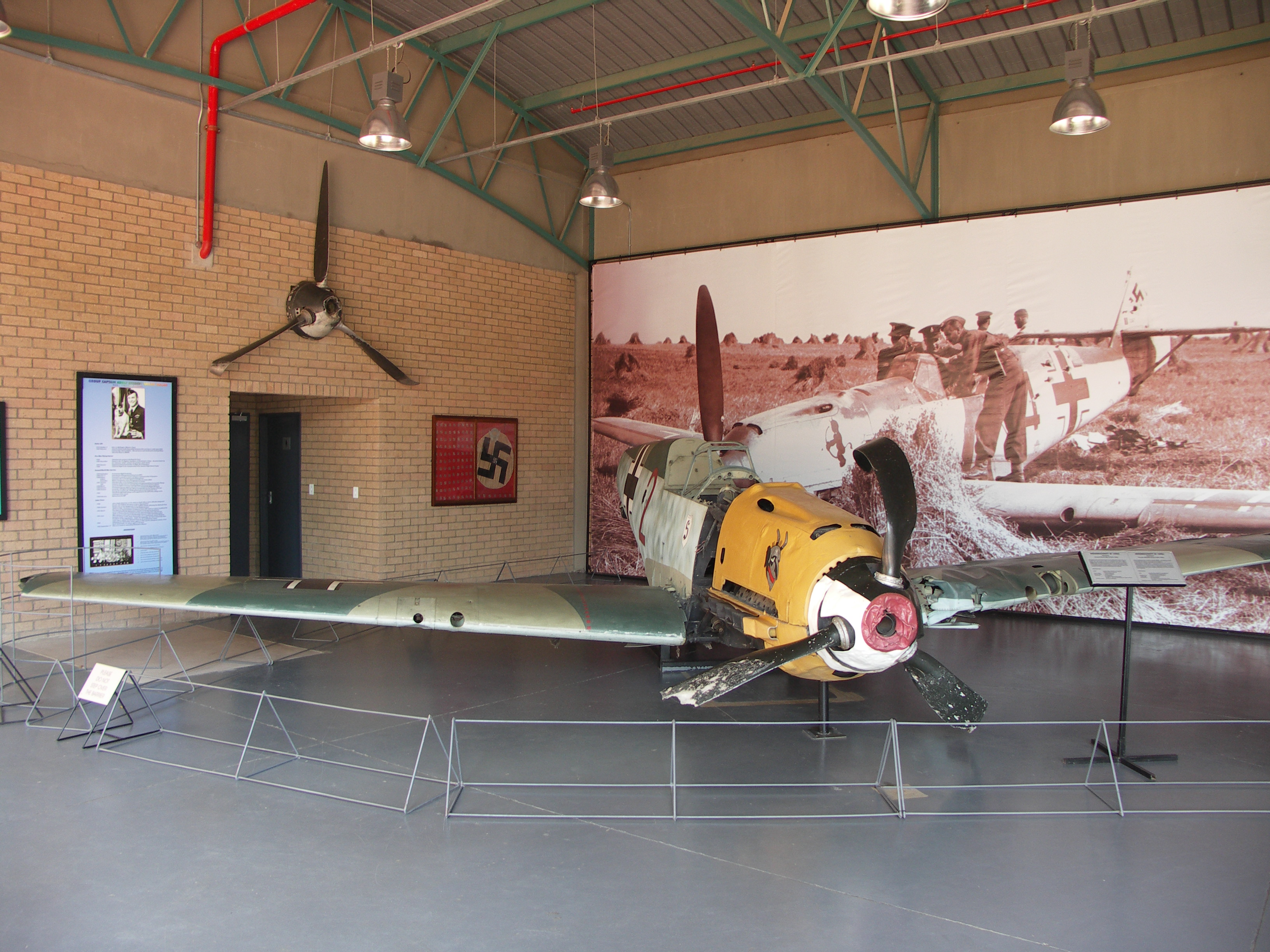
Bf 109 E-3, 1289

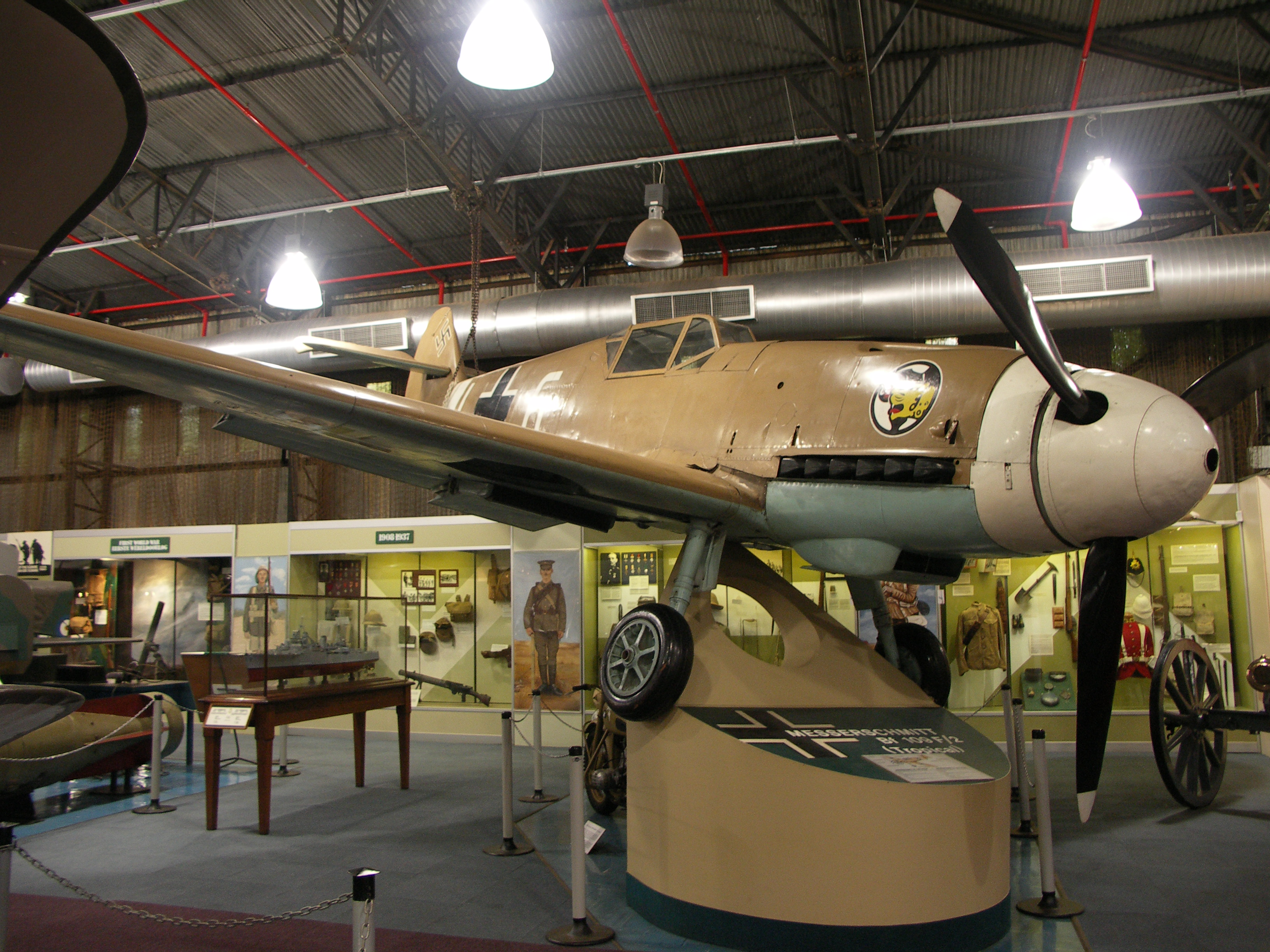
Bf 109 F-2 trop White 6 at the South African Museum

On display

- Bf 109 E-3 1289, ex-SH + FA, ex-2./JG 26 (Schlageter) "Red 2", Red 2 , South African National Museum of Military History, Johannesburg.
- Bf 109 F-4 trop, unknown Werknr, ex-7./JG 53, White 6, South African National Museum of Military History, Johannesburg.

=== Spain ===
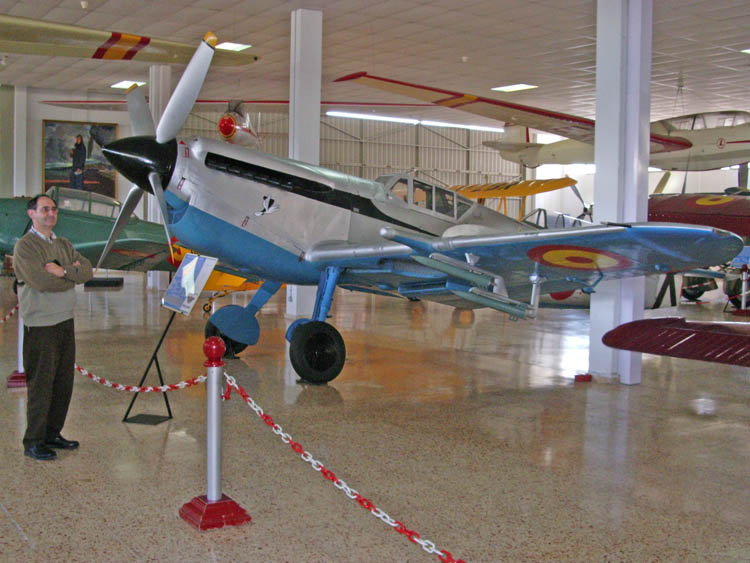
Hispano Aviación HA-1112-M1L Buchon with the original paint of the Spanish Air Force, preserved in the Museo del Aire, near Cuatro Vientos Airport, Madrid

On display

- HA-1109-K1L c/n 56 C.4J-10, ex-94 Sq "94-28", 94-28, Museo del Aire, Madrid.
- HA-1112-M1L c/n 211 C.4K-148, ex-471 Sq "471-23", 471-23, Museo del Aire, Madrid.

Stored or under restoration

- Bf 109 F-4 w/rn unknown, ex-JG 5 "White 4".

=== Switzerland ===
On display

- Bf 109 E-3 2242, ex-Swiss AF "J-355, J-355 , Swiss Air Force Museum, Dubendorf.

=== Turkey ===
On display

- Bf 109 G-6 w/n 441059, ex-Luftwaffe. HISART Museum, Istanbul.

=== United Kingdom ===
Airworthy

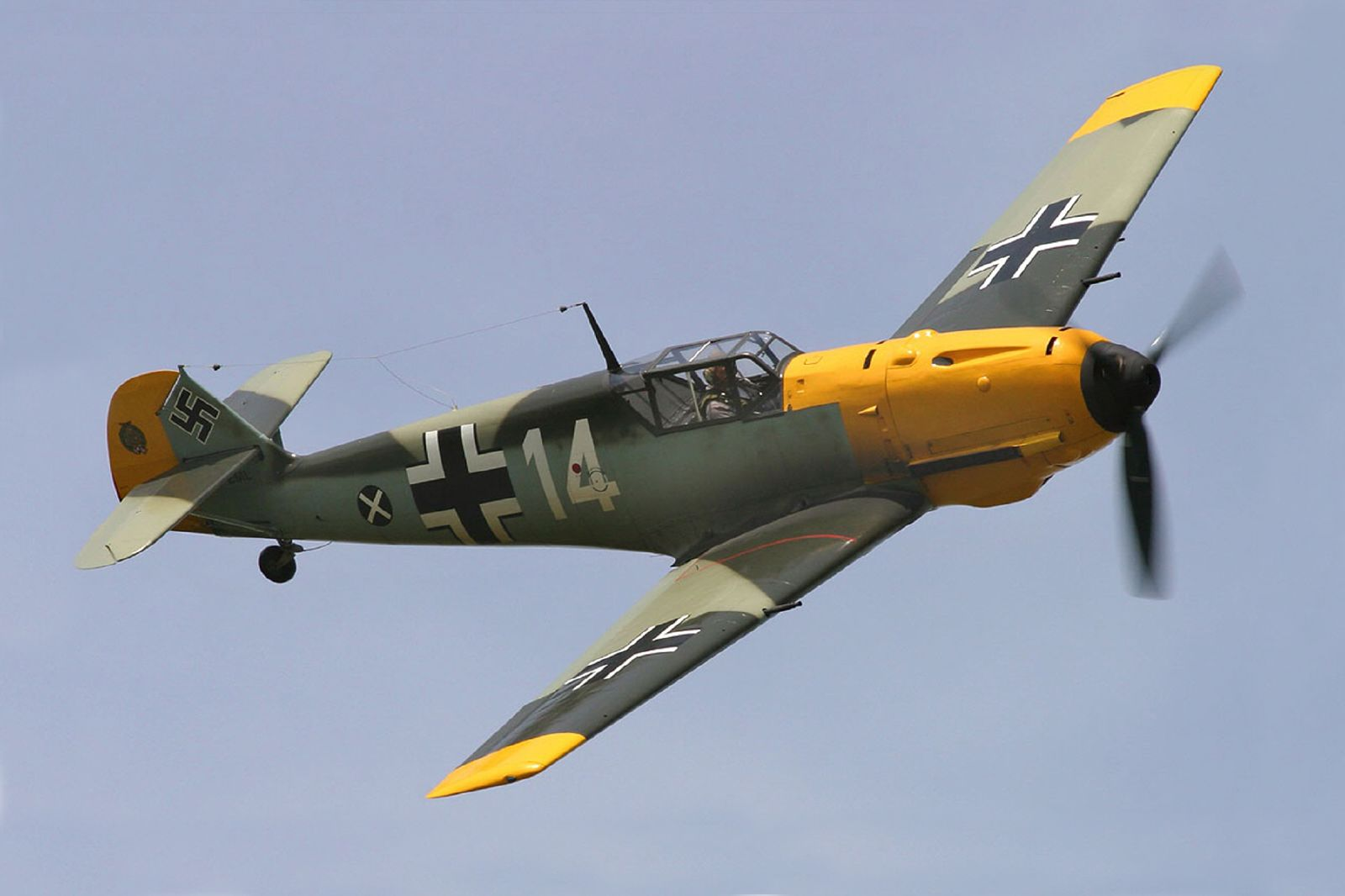
Bf 109 E-3 3579 at Thunder Over Michigan when owned by the Russell Group in Canada

- Bf 109 E-7 3579 (G-CIPB), ex-JG 2 "White 14", ex-Bf 109E-7 4/JG 5 "White 7" - crashed 2 August 1942, White 14, Biggin Hill Heritage Hangar, Biggin Hill. First flown after reassembly 13 June 2017.
- HA-1112-M1L (G-AWHH), movie: Battle of Britain, "White 9", Anglia Aircraft Restorations, Sywell/Duxford.
- HA-1112-M1L c/n 67 C.4K-31 (G-AWHE), movie: Battle of Britain "Red 8", Yellow 14, Air Leasing, Sywell.
- HA-1112-M1L c/n 172 C.4K-102 (G-AWHK), movie: Battle of Britain "Red 7", Yellow 10, Aircraft Restoration Company, Duxford, Cambridgeshire.
- HA-1112-M4L s/n 40/2 (G-AWHC), movie: Battle of Britain "Red 11", Air Leasing, Sywell. Restored to Bf 109 G-12 (two-seat trainer) status.

On display

- Bf 109 E-3 1190, ex-Bf 109E-4/N, ex-4./JG 26 "White 4", White 4. Imperial War Museum Duxford.
- Bf 109 E-3 4101, ex-GH + DX, ex-6./JG 52 "Yellow 8", ex-2/JG51 "Black 12", ex-RAF DG200, ex-No. 1426 Flight RAF (the "Rafwaffe"), used in Battle of Britain film, Black 12, RAF Museum Hendon.
- Bf 109 G-2 trop 10639 (G-USTV), ex-PG + QJ, ex-III./JG 77 "Black 6", ex-3 Sdn RAAF "CV-V", ex-RAF RN228 No.1426 Flight (Enemy Aircraft), Black 6 , Royal Air Force Museum Cosford. The aircraft was then the world's only airworthy example until 12 October 1997 when the plane flipped during landing after encountering an engine problem. Pilot Sir John Allison was uninjured in the incident. The plane was salvaged and restored to static display condition.
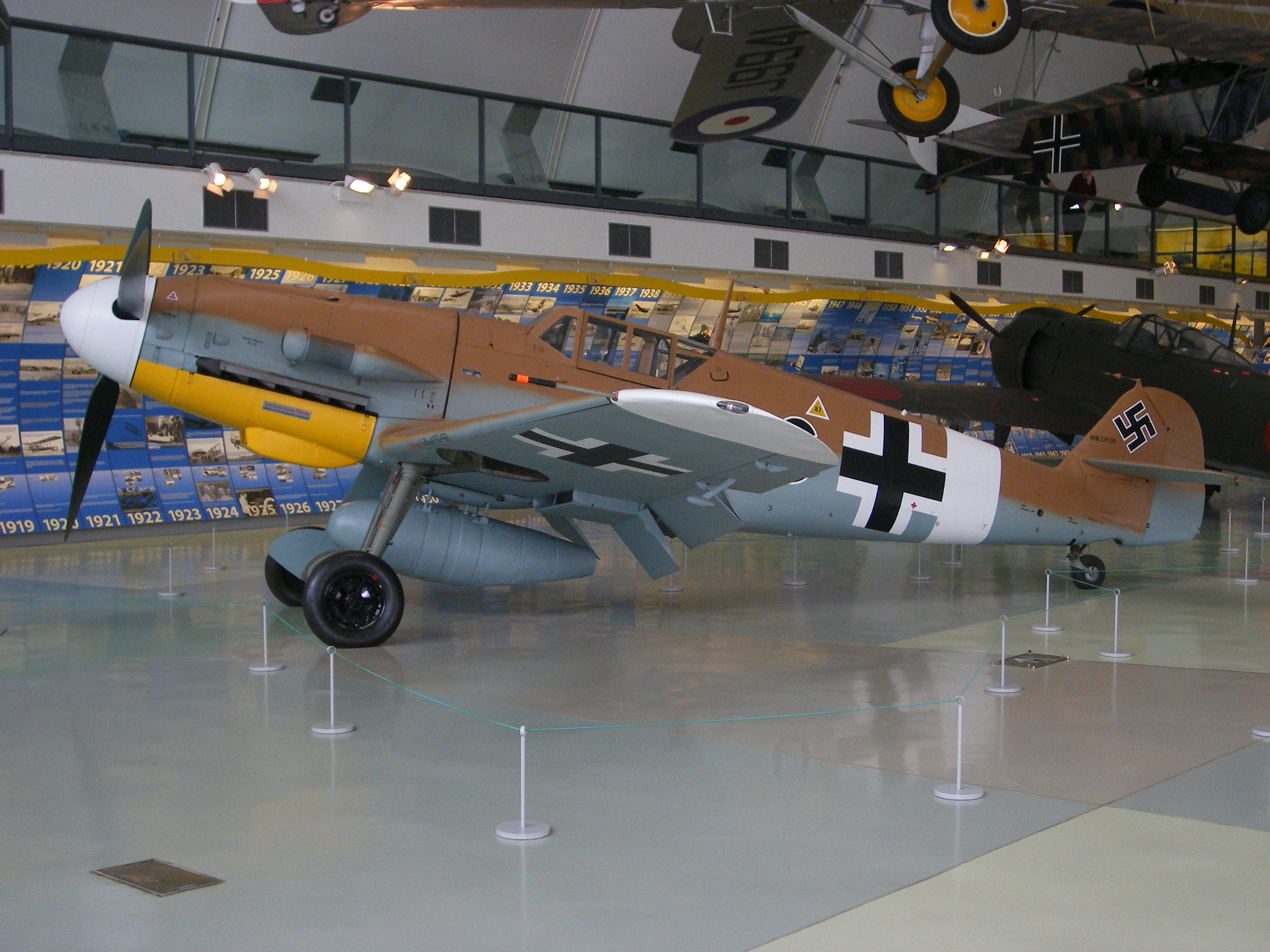
  Bf 109 G-2 trop 10639 Black 6 at the RAF Museum - Hendon
- Bf 109 E-4 4853, ex-2./JG 51, wreck on display at the Kent Battle of Britain Museum, Hawkinge.

Stored or under restoration

- Bf 109 E-1 696, ex-J/88/1 (Condor Legion) "6-88" (pilot: Hptm Siebelt Reents), ex-Spanish AF C5-88, ex-Spanish AF C4E-88, Robs Lamplough, Hungerford.
- Bf 109 E-1 854, Charleston Aviation Services.
- Bf 109 E-3 4034 (G-CDTI), ex-1/JG 77, ex-8/JG 53 "Black 5", "Black 6" - crashed 11 February 1940, Rare Aero Ltd, Jersey This plane, gifted to the Nizam of Hyderabad by the RAF, disappeared under mysterious circumstances from India in 2002. In response to these reports Rare Aero issued a statement it had obtained the aircraft legally.
- Bf 109 F-4 7485, ex-9./JG 5 "Black 1" Charleston Aviation Services.
- Bf 109 F-4 8347, ex-6./JG 54 "Yellow 10", Charleston Aviation Services.
- Bf 109 G-6 15458, ex-8./JG 1 "Black 10", ex-III/JG 1, CW Tomkins Ltd.

=== United States ===
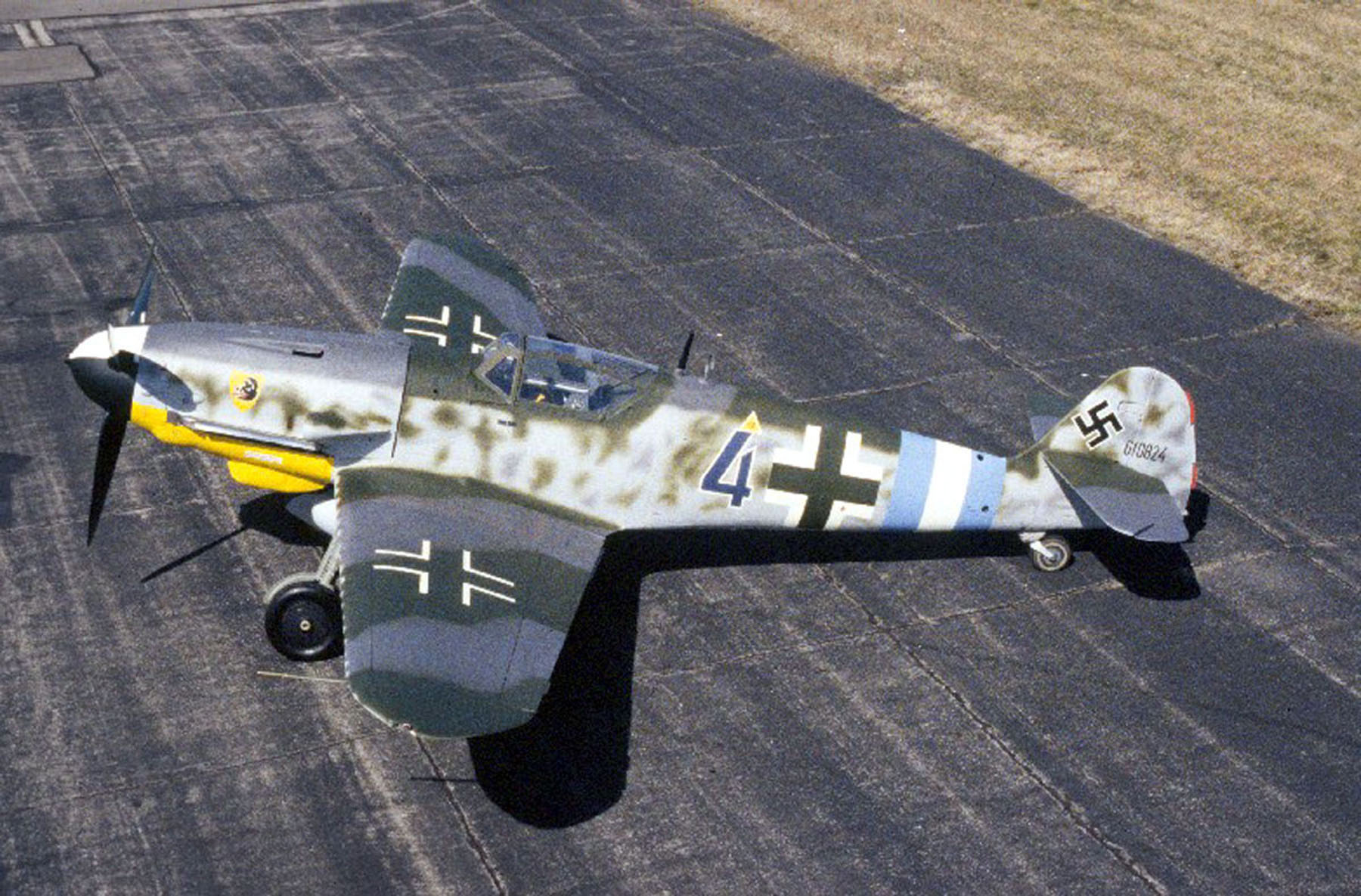
Bf 109 G-10 610824 Blue 4 at the USAF Museum

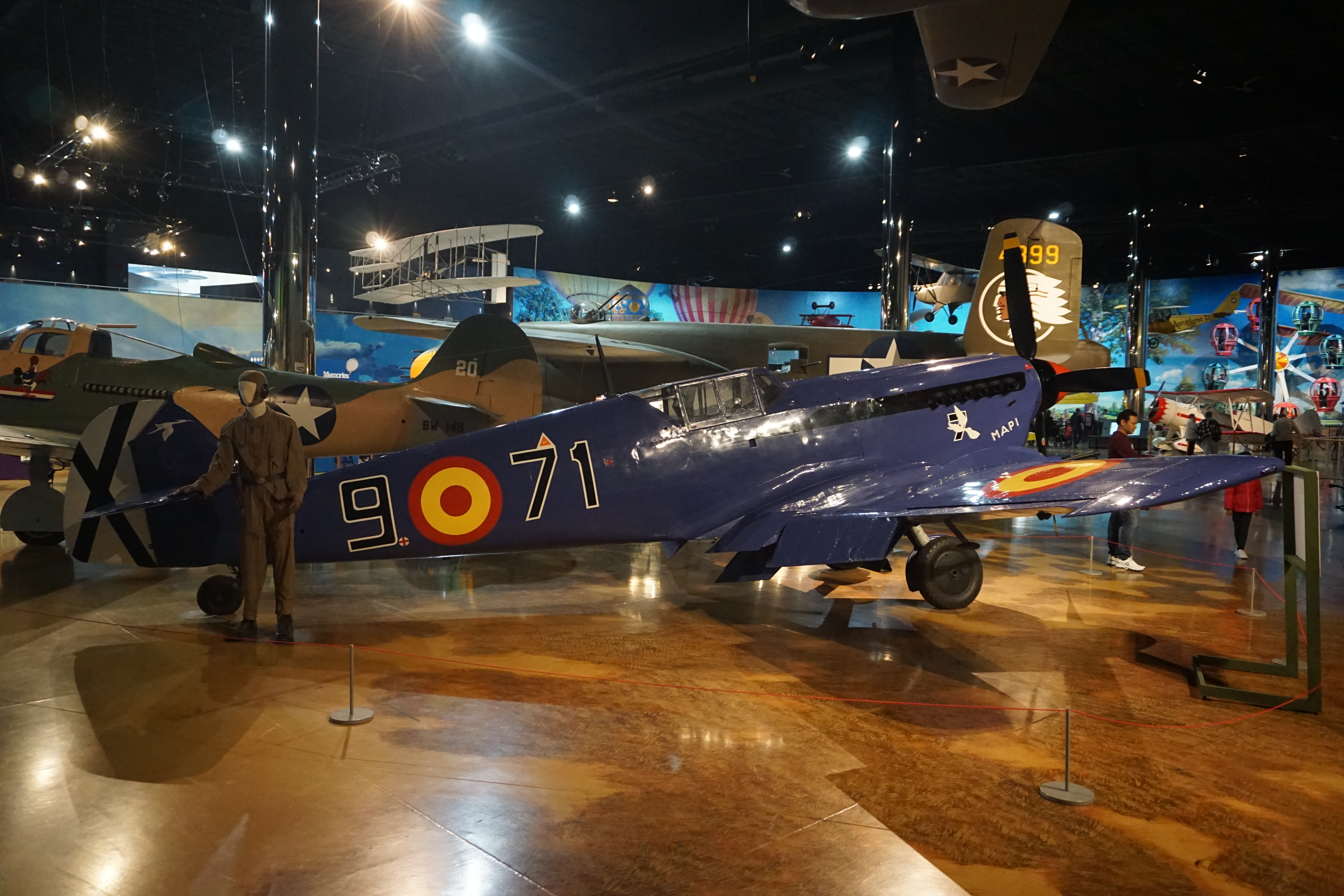
HA-1112 at the Air Zoo

Airworthy

- Bf 109 E-3 1342 (N342FH), ex-6./JG 51 "Yellow 8" (Pilot: Eduard Hemmerling) - crashed: 29 July 1940, Yellow 8, Flying Heritage Collection, Everett, Washington.
- Bf 109 G-4 19257 (N109GY), Black <1 , Training Services Inc, Virginia Beach, Virginia
- Bf 109 G-6 410077 (NX42109), ex-RK + FY, ex-IV./JG 54 "<+". Restored to airworthy by Midwest Aero Restorations for Dr Bruce Winter, DB 605 engine restored by Vintage Aero Engines.
- HA-1112-M1L c/n 193 C.4K-130 (N90602), movie: Battle of Britain "<", Erickson Aircraft Collection, Madras, Oregon. Restored to fly with a lowered Allison V-1710 and fitted with genuine Bf 109 G-10 cowling and reconfigured tail unit.
- HA-1112-M1L c/n 220 C.4K-152 (N109TS), movie: Battle of Britain "White 5", Condor, LLC., St Augustine Florida.

On display

- Bf 109 E-7 3523, ex-CS + AJ, ex-Bf 109E-1, ex-5/JG 5 "Red 6", Planes of Fame Air Museum. Chino, California.
- Bf 109 E-7 5975, ex-6./JG 5 "Yellow 4" - shot down 10 May 1942, Mighty Eighth Air Force Museum, Savannah, Georgia.
- Bf 109 G-6 trop 160756, ex-KT + LL, ex-3./JG 4 "Yellow 4", ex-USAAF FE-496, White 2 , National Air and Space Museum, Washington, D.C.
- Bf 109 G-10 610824 (N109MS), ex-II./JG 52 "Black 2", ex-USAAF FE-124, T2-124, Blue 4,National Museum of the United States Air Force, Wright-Patterson AFB, Ohio. with Erla Haube reduced-framing canopy and taller wooden vertical fin/rudder unit.
- Bf 109 G-14 610937 (N109EV), ex-Bf 109 G-10/U-4, ex-Bulgarian AF, Ex-Yugoslavian AF 9644, 172 Group / 83rd SQ "44", Green << , Previously at Evergreen Aviation Museum, McMinnville, Oregon; now at the American Heritage Museum, Stow, Massachusetts.
- Bf 109 G-10/U4 611943, ex-II./JG 52 "Yellow 13", ex-USAAF FE-122, T2-122 Yellow 13 , Planes of Fame, Valle, Arizona.
- HA-1112-M1L c/n 133 C.4K-64 (N109FF), ex-USAFM, <<+- , Military Aviation Museum, Virginia Beach, Virginia. Engined with DB605 and restored to Bf 109 G-2 condition.
- HA-1112-M1L c/n 171 C.4K-100 (N76GE), ex-71 Sq. "71-9", movie: Battle of Britain "Red 13", C.4K-19 71-9 Kalamazoo Aviation History Museum, Portage, Michigan.
- HA-1112-M1L c/n 186 C.4K-122 (N109J), movie: Battle of Britain "Yellow 7", << + |, Museum of Flight, Seattle, Washington, rebuilt as a Bf 109E with DB601 engine.
- HA-1112-M1L c/n 199 C.4K-127 (N109BF), movie: Battle of Britain - Hurricane "MI-S", ex-Edwards Collection, Yellow 1 + <- , EAA Aviation Museum, Oshkosh Wisconsin.
- Bf 109 G-10, assembled from original and reproduction parts and parts from crashed aircraft, displayed in JG 300 Wilde Sau livery of pilot Lt. Willi Trabert, National World War II Museum, New Orleans, Louisiana.

Stored or under restoration

- Bf 109 E-3 2023, ex-Bf 109E-7, ex-8./JG 5 "Black 9" (pilot Ofw. Walter Sommer) - crashed 27 May 1943, Military Aviation Museum Virginia Beach, Virginia.
- Bf 109 F-4 8461, ex-5./JG 27, Malcolm Laing.
- Bf 109 F-4 10144, ex-6./JG 5 "Yellow 7" (pilot Fw. Albert Brunner) - crashed 5 September 1942, Air Assets International, Lafayette, Colorado.
- Bf 109 G-2 10394, ex-6./JG 5 "Yellow 2" (pilot Fw. Erwin Fahldieck) - crashed 29 April 1943, Malcolm Laing, Texas.
- Bf 109 G-2 13500, ex-II./JG ? "Red 4".
- Bf 109 F-4 10212, ex-JG 5, Air Assets International, Lafayette, Colorado.
- Bf 109 F-4 10256, ex-11./JG 5 "<", (pilot Fw. Horst Carganico) - crashed 22 July 1942, Mickael R., Framingham, Massachusetts.
- Bf 109 F-4 10270, ex-JG 5 "<", Mickael R., Framingham, Massachusetts.
- Bf 109 F-4 10276, ex-JG 5, Air Assets International, Lafayette, Colorado.
- Bf 109 G-2 13927, ex-6./JG 5 "Yellow 6".
- HA-1112-M1L c/n unknown C.4K-30, ex-471 Sq "471-26", movie: Battle of Britain, Edwards Collection, Wilson Edwards, Big Spring, Texas.
- HA-1112-M1L c/n 120 C.4K-77 (N700E), Yellow 3 , Planes of Fame, Chino, California. Under restoration to fly with Merlin 228 and reconfigured 109G-style cowling.
- HA-1112-M1L c/n 129 C.4K-61 (G-AWHE), movie: Battle of Britain, Edwards Collection, Wilson Edwards, Big Spring, Texas.
- HA-1112-M1L c/n 137 C.4K-116 (N6109), Quantico, Virginia.
- HA-1112-M1L c/n 145 C.4K-105 (N6036), movie: Battle of Britain "Red 4", ex-Edwards Collection, Richard Hansen, Batavia Illinois.
- HA-1112-M1L c/n unknown C.4K-111, ex-471 Sq "471-15", movie: Battle of Britain, Edwards Collection, Wilson Edwards, Big Spring, Texas.
- HA-1112-M1L c/n 166 C.4K-106 (N90607), movie: Battle of Britain "Yellow 8", Edwards Collection, Wilson Edwards, Big Spring, Texas.
- HA-1112-M1L c/n 187 C.4K-99 (N90604), ex-7 Sq "7-77", movie: Battle of Britain "Yellow 5", Yellow 5 , Edwards Collection, Wilson Edwards, Big Spring, Texas.
- HA-1112-M1L c/n 190 C.4K-126 (N90603), movie: Battle of Britain "Red 9", Edwards Collection, Wilson Edwards, Big Spring, Texas.
- HA-1112-M1L c/n 195 C.4K-135, movie: Battle of Britain, ex-Victory Air Museum, St Louis, Missouri.
- HA-1112-M1L c/n 223 C.4K-154, movie: Battle of Britain, Edwards Collection, Wilson Edwards, Big Spring, Texas.
- HA-1112-M1L c/n 178 C.4K-178, movie: Battle of Britain, ex-Victory Air Museum, The 1941 Historical Aircraft Group, Geneseo, New York, rebuilt with DB601N engine.
- HA-1112-M4L c/n unknown C.4K-112, Accepted: Spanish AF, Assigned: 7 Sqd (codes:7 - 92), Assigned: 40 Sqd (codes: 40 - 2), Movie: 1969 Battle of Britain (markings: Red 11), Sold: 1970 Wilson Edwards (N1109G) currently in storage with the Edwards Collection, Wilson Edwards, Big Spring, Texas marked as Red 11.

== See also ==
- Hispano Aviación HA-1112
- Avia S-99/S-199
