= Great Spirit (disambiguation) =

Great Spirit may refer to:

== Religion and mythology ==
- Great Spirit, an English translation of various synonyms in the languages of North American Native tribes for the common concept of a universal spiritual force. These include:
  - Unetlanvhi in Cherokee mythology
  - Wakan Tanka in Lakota tradition
  - Gitche Manitou in Algonquian tradition
  - Great Spirit in mythologies of the Indigenous peoples of the Americas
  - Manitou in Algonquian tradition
- God, the Supreme Being and the principal object of faith in a variety of traditions

== Geographical ==
- Waconda Spring, a place in Kansas translated as "Great Spirit" spring
- Moniteau County, Missouri, a county named after Algonquian Manitou
- Big Manitou Falls, English translation of Gitchee Manitou, a waterfall in Wisconsin

== Other ==
- Appeal to the Great Spirit, a 1908 equestrian statue by Cyrus Dallin, located in front of the Boston Museum of Fine Arts on the Huntington Avenue side
- Holy Book of the Great Invisible Spirit, a formerly lost Coptic gospel
- "Great Spirit", a 2016 song by Armin van Buuren vs Vini Vici featuring Hilight Tribe.

== See also ==
- Spirit of God (disambiguation)
- Wakanda (disambiguation)
