= Spirit of God =

Spirit of God may refer to:

== Abrahamic religions ==
- Holy Spirit, a concept within the Abrahamic religions
- Holy Spirit in Christianity, the third divine person of the Trinity
  - Paraclete, a Christian biblical term occurring five times in the Johannine texts of the New Testament
  - Seven Spirits of God, a term appearing four times in the Book of Revelation
- Holy Spirit in Islam, a Quranic expression that describes a source or means of prophetic revelations
- Holy Spirit in Judaism, the divine force, quality, and influence of God over the universe or over God's creatures
  - Shekhinah, the English transliteration of a Hebrew word meaning "dwelling" or "settling" and denotes the presence of God in a place
- Maid of Heaven, a vision that Baháʼu'lláh had of a messenger of God who gave him his mission

== Chinese folk religion ==
- Qi, traditionally believed to be a vital force part of all living entities in the Sinosphere
- Tian, one of the oldest Chinese terms for heaven and a key concept in Chinese mythology, philosophy, and religion

== Hinduism ==
- Brahman, the highest universal principle, the Ultimate Reality of the universe
- Paramatman, the absolute Atman, or supreme Self

== Native American religions ==
- Gitche Manitou, meaning "Great Spirit" in several Algonquian languages
- Great Spirit, an omnipresent supreme life force, generally conceptualized as a supreme being or god, in the traditional religious beliefs of many indigenous cultures in Canada and the United States

== Zoroastrianism ==
- Ahura Mazda, the creator deity and god of the sky in the ancient Iranian religion Zoroastrianism
- Spenta Mainyu, one of the Amesha Spenta, the "Holy Spirit"

== Other religions ==
- Nāma, Sanskrit for "name"

== See also ==
- Great Spirit (disambiguation)
- Holy Spirit (disambiguation)
