= Air Estates Airport =

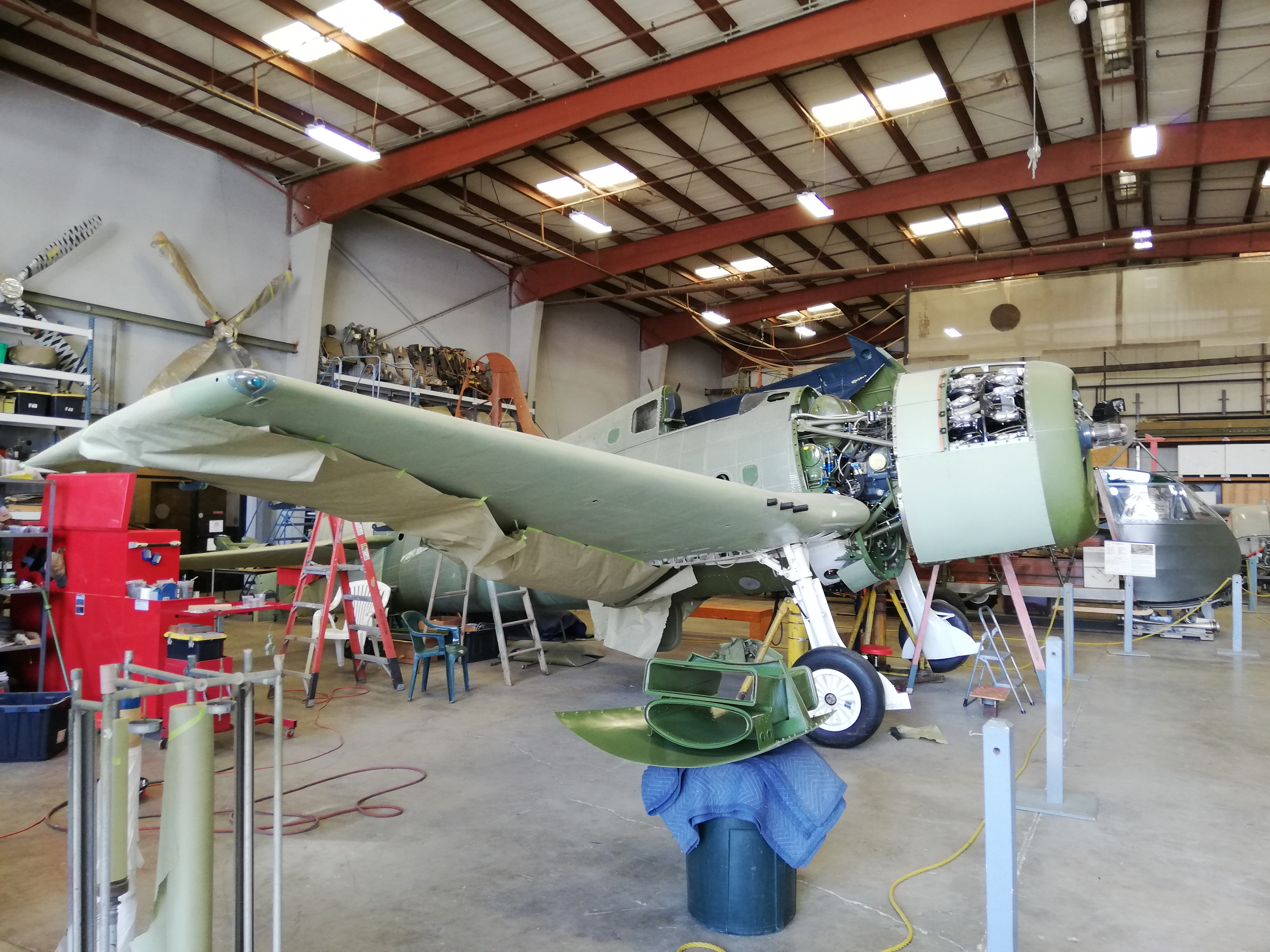
- A Grumman F6F-3 Hellcat, previously exhibited at the Victory Air Museum, being restored at the Yanks Air Museum in Chino, California
- IATA: none; ICAO: none; FAA LID: LL09

Summary
- Airport type: private
- Owner: Air Estates Inc
- Location: Fremont Township; Lake County, Illinois
- Opened: 1961
- Elevation AMSL: 800 ft (240 m)
- Coordinates: 42°16′50″N 88°05′40″W
- Interactive map of Air Estates Airport

Runways
Direction	Length		Surface
Direction	ft	m	Surface
	2,000	610	turf

Air Estates Inc Airport (FAA LID: LL09) is a defunct private airport in Fremont Township, Lake County, Illinois. It is located between Wauconda and Mundelein.

The airport has one unpaved runway that is 2000 ft long and 150 ft wide. This airstrip is in a state of disrepair.

== History ==
=== 1961–1979 ===
The airport opened in 1961. Early on, it was known as Polidori RLA, after pilot and owner Amalio "Paul" Polidori.

In 1966, Polidori and an airplane parts trader, Earl Reinert, opened the Victory Air Museum adjacent to the airstrip. The museum specialized in aircraft used in World War II. Behind the museum structure and partially along the airstrip was an outdoor display of airplanes.

Polidori reported attracting between 2000 and 3000 visitors to the museum in each of the years 1976 and 1977.

=== 1980–1999 ===
From 1982 or earlier, an annual Father's Day fly-in event was held. About two weeks after what in 1985 would become the last annual fly-in at the Victory Aircraft Museum Airstrip, Paul Polidori died at the age of 72, along with an amateur areal photographer, when the 45-year-old plane Polidori flew crashed while approaching for a landing at the airport.

After the death of Polidori, the museum closed and the airport was sold. The new airport owner, Air Estates Inc., constructed a dedicated airport building on the north end of the airstrip. The airport's new name was Air Estates Airport.

=== 21st century ===
Aerial photography shows that in the 21st century or earlier Air Estates Airport was abandoned. Its runway, especially where it passes in between two ponds, has deteriorated. The museum structure still had the text "Victory Air Museum" written on its roof in 2022.
