= Wakonda =

Wakonda or Waconda may refer to:

== Fiction ==
- Wakonda, Oregon, a fictional city in the U.S. state of Oregon from the novel Sometimes a Great Notion
- Wakonda's Dream, a modern opera about contemporary Native Americans, often referred to as Wakonda

== Places ==
- Waconda, Oregon, an unincorporated community in Marion County, Oregon
- Waconda Spring, a natural artesian spring in the U.S. state of Kansas
  - Waconda Lake, a reservoir in Kansas, named for the inundated spring
- Wakonda Beach State Airport in Waldport, Oregon
- Wakonda, South Dakota, a town in the U.S. state of South Dakota
  - Wakonda Variety, historic place in the South Dakota town
- Wakonda State Park in the U.S. state of Missouri

== Ships ==
- USS Wakonda (YTB-528), a proposed United States Navy tugboat that was never built, the contract for her construction being cancelled in 1945

== People ==
- Josephine Waconda (1935–2013), American nurse and administrator

== See also ==
- Wakanda (disambiguation)
