= Wauconda Area Library =

Public library in Wauconda, Illinois, US

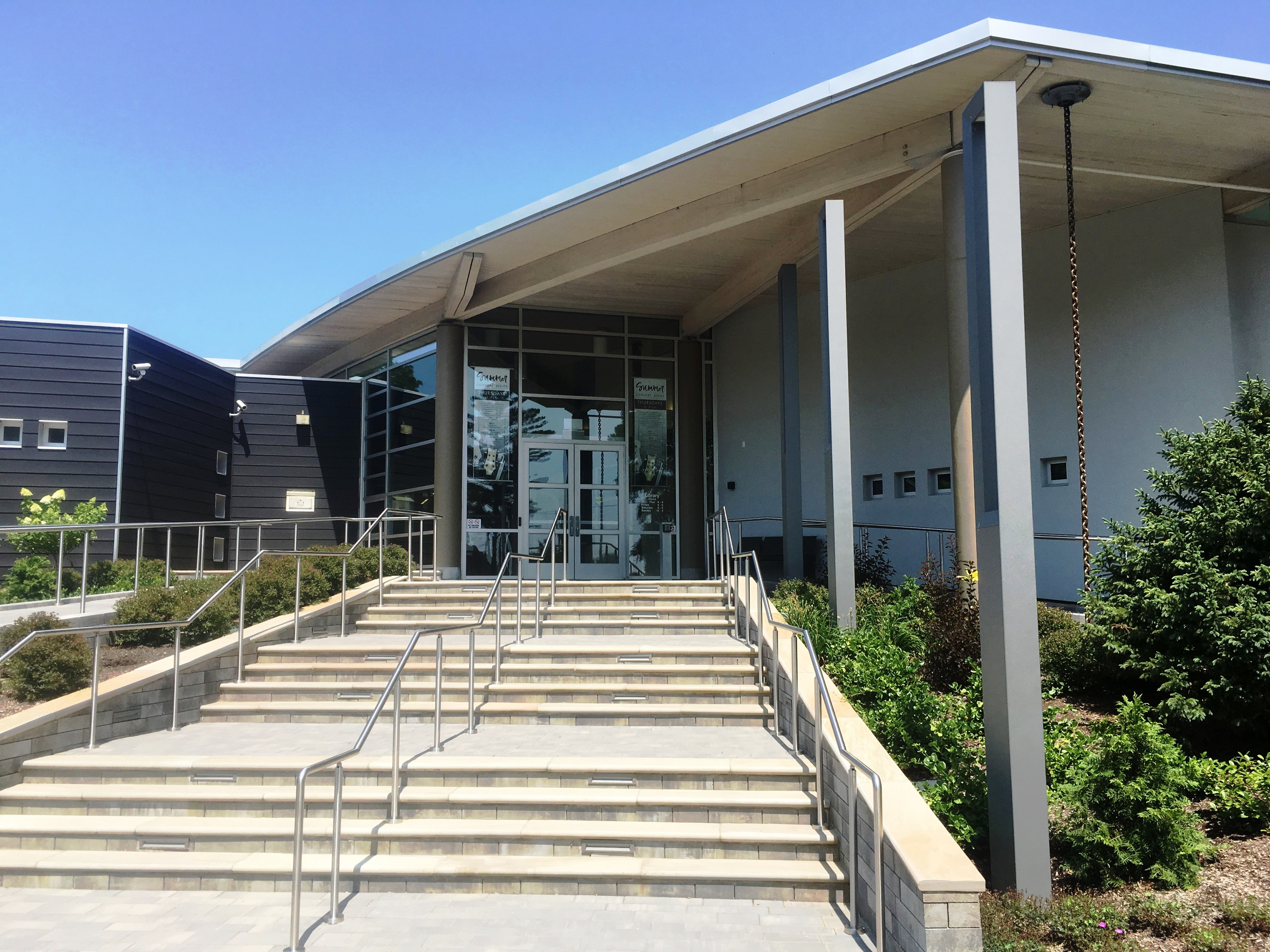
- 42.2706°N 88.1450°W
- Location: 801 N Main St, Wauconda, Illinois, USA
- Type: Public library
- Established: 1939

Collection
- Size: 104,625

Access and use
- Circulation: 254,189
- Population served: 27,246

Other information
- Website: wauclib.org

The Wauconda Area Library is a public library located in Wauconda, Illinois. The library district covers portions of Lake and McHenry Counties in Illinois and is a member of the Reaching Across Illinois Library System (RAILS).

== History ==
The library was founded in 1939 by the Wauconda Women's Club as one shelf of books at Wauconda High School. In 1948 as book count increased the library was moved to the larger space at the local sports shop and officially became known as Wauconda Public Library. In 1950 the library was moved to a room in the Village Hall due to the rent costs of the previous space. In 1962 a referendum was passed which led to transferring of the library title to the library board and becoming a township library. In 1963 the library was moved again to 212 Osage Street renting the front part of the building which was later bought in whole in 1971. In 1982 land was purchased to accommodate growing needs and a new building opened by 1987. In 1988 the library became a public library district. In 1997 a remodel occurred to expand the capacity of the library. The library earned the Distinguished Building Award in 1998 from the American Institute of Architects.

In 2015, the library underwent a renovation of the interior of the building. It added a kids play area downstairs, along with various other features.

In 2018 a renovation occurred to the exterior of the library after feedback from the community.

In 2020, the library started offering patrons remote reservations and contactless checkouts through MyLIBRO application.
