= Wauconda Bog Nature Preserve =

- Location within Illinois
- Location: Wauconda, Illinois
- Coordinates: 42.2539°N 88.1302°W
- Area: 67 acres (27 ha)
- Established: 1972
- Governing body: Illinois Department of Natural Resources
- Website: www.dnr.illinois.gov/INPC/Pages/Area2LakeWaucondaBog.aspx

U.S. National Natural Landmark
- Designated: 1972

Wauconda Bog Nature Preserve is a tamarack bog nature preserve located in Wauconda (a suburb of Chicago) Lake County, Illinois. It is a National Natural Landmark.

== Biological history ==
The Wauconda Bog is a wetland created by the Wisconsin glaciation, the most recent of the so-called ice ages to affect the Illinois landscape. Core samples have been extracted from the peat layers contained within the bog, and they have told a vivid story of climate change in central North America during the postglacial period. Different levels of temperature and precipitation encouraged the growth of very different kinds of plant life during this period; these diverse species released large quantities of characteristic pollen, which was trapped within the layers of peat preserved here.

Geomorphologists sometimes compare the Wauconda Bog with the nearby Volo Bog, also a National Natural Landmark located about 7 miles (11 km) north of the Wauconda Bog. The two bogs displays different stages of a bog's life cycle. The Wauconda Bog, unlike Volo Bog, no longer has any patches of open water; instead, layers of wet and damp peat support characteristic wetland plant forms such as tamarack, cattails, wetland orchids, yellow birch, and poison sumac.

== Today ==
A 67-acre (27 ha) parcel that comprises the Wauconda Bog site is owned by the Lake County Forest Preserve District. It is minimally accessible to the public. U.S. Highway 12 adjoins the bog.

The bog was named as an Illinois Nature Preserve in 1970, and was designated a National Natural Landmark in 1972.
