= Wyaconda =

Wyaconda may refer to:

- Wyaconda, Missouri
- Wyaconda River
- USCGC Wyaconda, a Gasconade-class buoy tender used by the United States Coast Guard
