= Palatine, Lake Zurich and Wauconda Railroad =

Coordinates: 42°8′29″N 88°3′41″W

The Palatine, Lake Zurich and Wauconda Railroad (PLZ&W) was an 11-mile (18-kilometer) short-line railroad built to connect the towns of Palatine, Lake Zurich, and Wauconda in the northern part of the U.S. state of Illinois.

== History ==
Justin Orvis and Robert Wynn founded this railroad. They originally envisioned a 75-mile (120-kilometer) electric route throughout Lake and McHenry counties, but this was the only stretch developed. The route delivered freight and commuters to these communities, as well as vacationers to Dr. Wilson's Deer Grove Park picnic grounds (now Deer Grove Forest Preserve). The railroad had many problems due to secondhand equipment and the steep trestle built to cross the Elgin, Joliet and Eastern in Lake Zurich. The most famous engine on this route was nicknamed "Old Maud" and was purchased from the Chicago and North Western Railway.

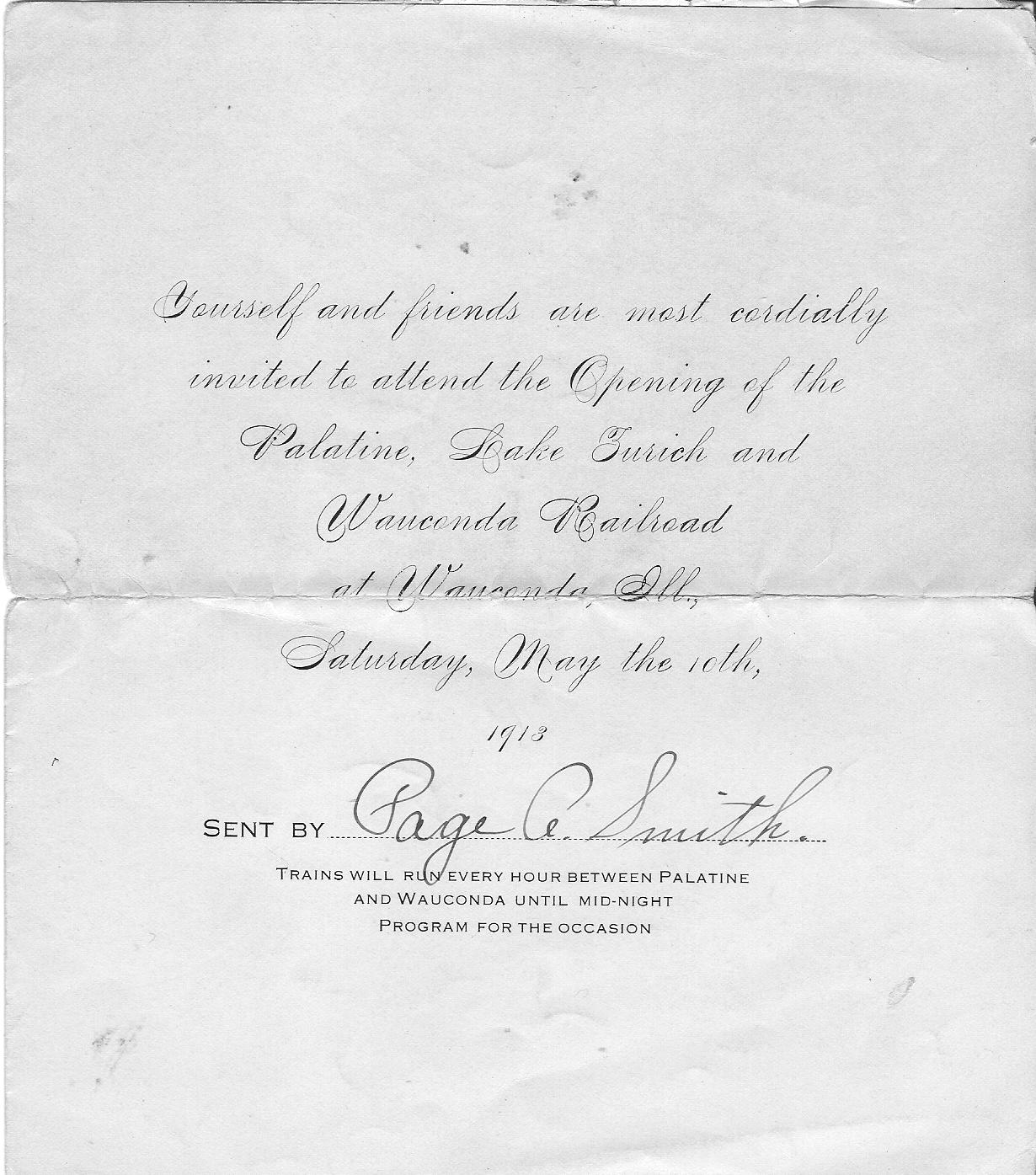
Invitation to opening

The railroad opened on August 25, 1912 and closed in 1924. Financial mismanagement, the improvement of local roads and the rise of the automobile helped bring down this route. 1920 or 1921 the railroad was reorganized as Chicago, Palatine and Wauconda Railroad Company.

== Passenger service ==
According to the August 1913 timetable, as published in the Official Guide, the line saw three passenger trains in each direction Mondays through Saturdays, and five trains each way on Sundays. The trips were numbered 1 to 20, with odd numbers towards Palatine, and even numbers towards Wauconda. The Sunday services had the train numbers 11 through 20. In the January 1916 timetable, only three daily trains each way were offered, reduced to two daily trains each way in the September 1919 schedule. In 1919, odd-numbered trains went to Wauconda, whereas even-numbered trains went to Palatine. An additional pair of trains on Saturdays was offered in the March 1921 schedules, but this additional train was soon discontinued. The March 1923 schedule offered only two daily pairs of trains again.

== Post closure ==
Richard Whitney researched the railroad for 30 years and wrote the book Old Maud: The Story of the Palatine, Lake Zurich & Wauconda Railroad, published by Transportation Trails in 1992. In the spring of 2014 in the railroad magazine First and Fastest, William R. Coulson wrote an article entitled "No Good Deeds Go Unpunished: The Sad Story of the Waukegan, Rockford & Elgin Traction Company", which reports on the discovery in a Waukegan basement of the 100-year-old original land deeds for the railroad's right-of-way. The article also posits that the nickname "Old Maud" of both the engine and the railroad itself originated from the name of railroad founder and attorney Claire Edwards' sister - whose name was Maud. The deeds attached detailed plats showing the exact location of the entire right-of-way. The deeds are being donated to the Lake County Discovery Museum.

Portions of the PLZ&W right-of-way are still visible, especially along the Palatine Bike Path south of Dundee Road and just north of Dundee Road in the Deer Grove Forest Preserve, where you can still find the pilings for the bridge that crossed the creek.

Wooden ties and spikes were found in these areas in 2006. Another relatively undisturbed section is in the wooded area just north of Cuba Road and east of Rand Road. A beautiful section of canopy trees over the old rail bed was found there in 2007. Farther north in Lake Zurich along the east side of Old Rand Road and just south of Kitts the raised bed is clearly seen from Old Rand Road during the winter. Other sections west of Quentin Road are visible but difficult to get to because of the thick brush.
