= Wauconda, Illinois =

- Village
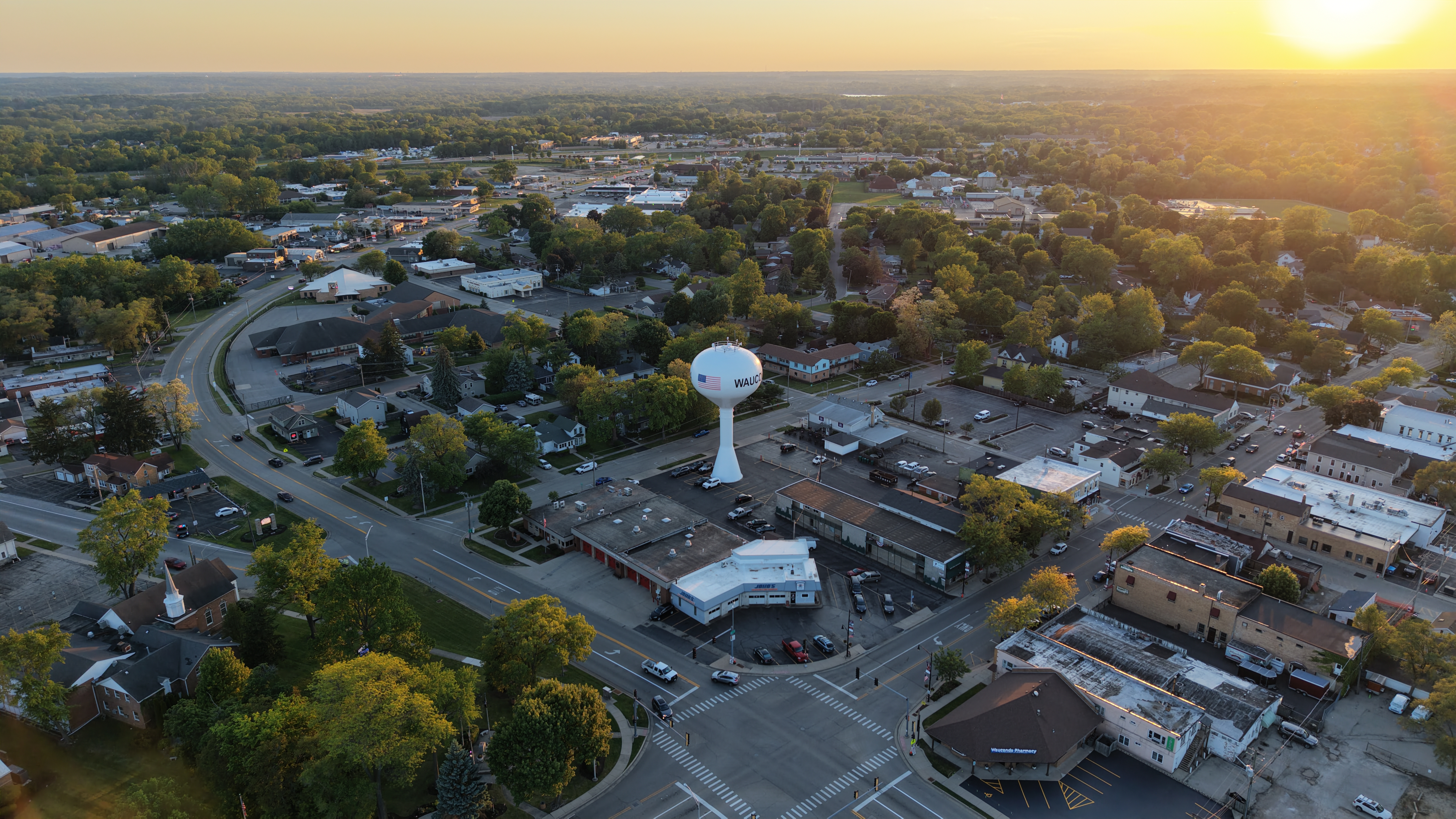
- Aerial view of downtown Wauconda, Illinois

- Flag
- Motto: "Water, Spirit, Wonder."
- Location of Wauconda in Lake County, Illinois.
- Coordinates: 42°15′50″N 88°08′40″W
- Country: United States
- State: Illinois
- County: Lake
- Township: Wauconda
- Incorporated: 1872

Government
  - Mayor: Jeff A. Sode

Area
  - Total: 5.76 sq mi (14.93 km^{2})
  - Land: 5.07 sq mi (13.14 km^{2})
  - Water: 0.69 sq mi (1.79 km^{2})
- Elevation: 771 ft (235 m)

Population (2020)
  - Total: 14,084
  - Density: 2,776.6/sq mi (1,072.05/km^{2})
- Time zone: UTC-6 (CST)
  - Summer (DST): UTC-5 (CDT)
- ZIP Code(s): 60084
- Area codes: 847 and 224
- FIPS code: 17-79267
- GNIS feature ID: 2400108
- Website: wauconda-il.gov

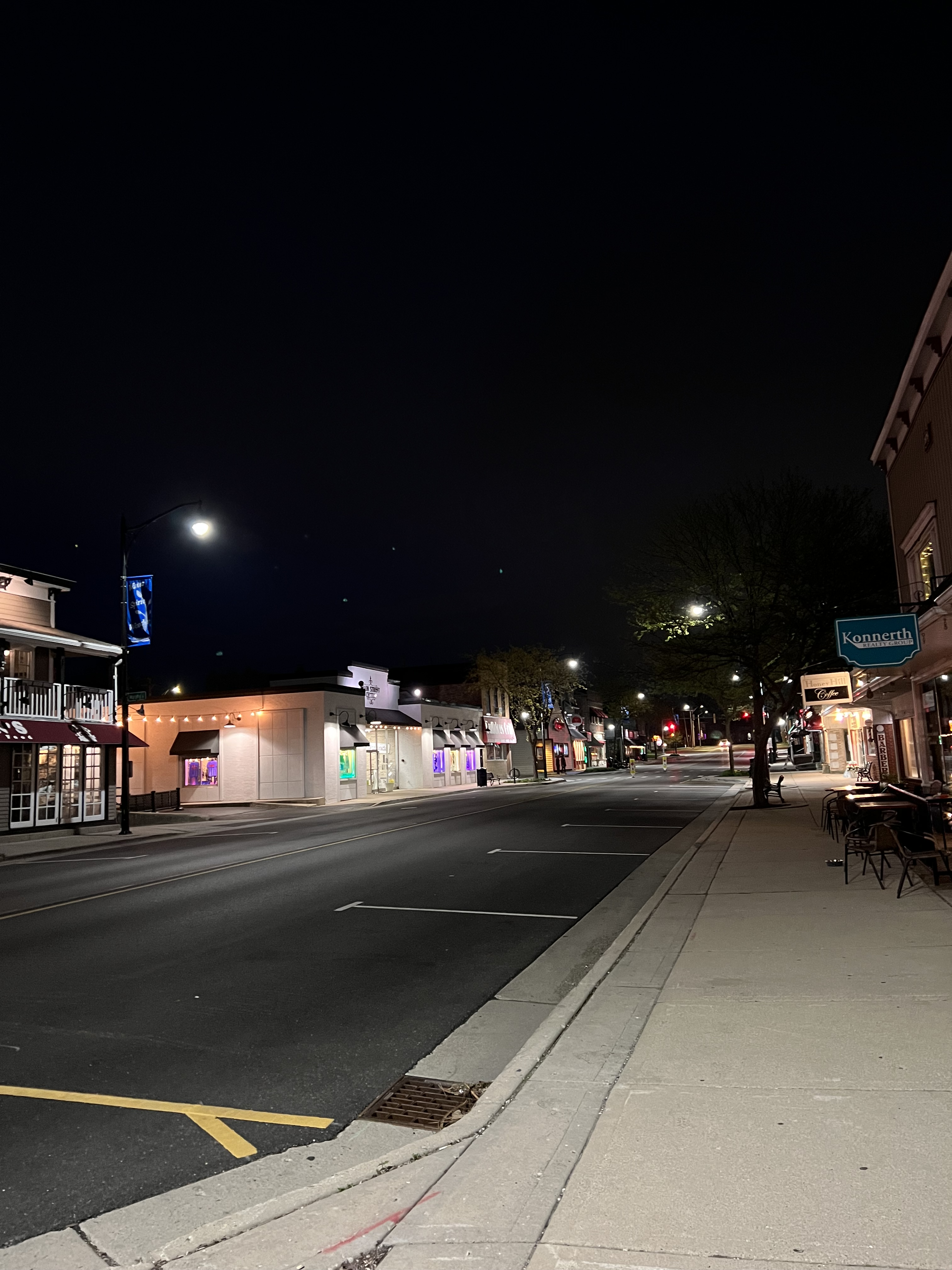
A portion of Wauconda's Main Street at night

Wauconda (/ˌwɔːˈkɒndə/ or /wəˈkɒndə/) is a village in Lake County, Illinois, United States, a northwest suburb of Chicago. Per the 2020 census, the population was 14,084. It is the site of the Wauconda Bog Nature Preserve, a National Natural Landmark. Wauconda Community Unit School District 118 serves students from Pre-K through 12th grade who live in Wauconda and surrounding communities (Island Lake, Lakemoor, Volo, and unincorporated sections of McHenry County). Fremont School District 79 also serves students from communities from northern part of Wauconda.

== History ==
=== 1800s ===
According to local legend, Wauconda was named after an indigenous chief whose name translated as 'spirit water'.

Many early settlers of Wauconda came from New England and New York by covered wagon or through the Erie Canal and the Great Lakes.

Elihu Hubbard built the first log cabin on the bank of Bangs Lake in 1836. Justus Bangs, the first settler in Wauconda, built a house next to the lake in 1848 and the lake was later named after him. In 1840, members of the Ho-Chunk tribe who did not leave the shores of the Fox River often went to the area to trade. In 1849, Wauconda was organized into a town by a vote of the people of Lake County to divide Lake County into towns. There were 1,695 votes cast and all except three were in favor of the division. The first town meeting was held on the first Tuesday in April 1850 where the first officers were elected and appointed.

Wauconda's first school was built in 1839 and the area's post office was moved to Wauconda on June 27, 1849, with Hazard Green becoming its first postmaster.

Elder Joel Wheeler of McHenry built the first Baptist church in Wauconda in the autumn of 1838. A Methodist church was organized on September 3, 1852, by Reverend C. French, and built in 1856 on the Commons. Both Methodists and Baptists attended prayer at the church until February 1870, when the Baptists reorganized and built a new church on October 30, 1870. A Catholic church was built in 1877 and its first trustees were James S. Murray, Charles Davlin, Felix Givens, John Givens, Hugh Davlin, and Owen McMahon. Its first priest was Father O'Neil.

In 1850, Wauconda had a population of around 200 residents, and the town had three goods stores, two public houses and various mechanics.

The Village of Wauconda was incorporated on August 18, 1877.

=== 1900s ===
By the early 1900s, Wauconda was a popular resort village for Chicago residents and Bangs Lake was made suitable for beaches. The Palatine, Lake Zurich and Wauconda Railroad was completed and hauled agricultural products, delivered mail, transported local passengers, and brought vacationers and day-trippers out from Chicago. Although the railroad did not help develop Wauconda, which remained a small town, it flourished as a resort, and residents depended on it for supplies and for mail.

The railroad closed in 1920 due to lack of business. Later in the decade, Phil's Beach was opened by Phil Froehlke and the right of way was purchased for Route 176 (Liberty Street) through the center of town.

By the end of the 1930s, Wauconda's population exceeded 500 residents. At the end of the 1960s, Wauconda had three elementary schools, a junior high, and a high school. By the end of the 1970s there were about 5,600 residents living in Wauconda.

In the early 1950s, a bypass for US-12 was built to go around Wauconda.

Throughout the 1980s, most of the beaches on Bangs Lake gradually closed down. They were replaced by houses, townhomes, and other development. Development continued into the 1990s and 2000s as individuals from the outlying Chicago suburbs sought cheaper land. Large new subdivisions were developed north of the town center and small suburbs were established in the surrounding areas.

=== 2000s ===
In 2000, Wauconda's population was 9,386. By 2020, it had grown to 14,084 residents.

The village completed a switch to Lake Michigan water in October 2019. This was the largest infrastructure project in village history, costing $48 million.

On April 4, 2023, a referendum was held in the village to determine home rule status. The result of the referendum was to reject home rule status.

== Geography ==
According to the 2021 census gazetteer files, Wauconda has a total area of 5.76 square miles (14.92 km^{2}), of which 5.07 square miles (13.13 km^{2}) (or 87.99%) is land and 0.69 square miles (1.79 km^{2}) (or 12.01%) is water.

== Demographics ==
Historical population
| Census | Pop. | Note | %± |
|---|---|---|---|
| 1880 | 298 | | — |
| 1890 | 368 | | 23.5% |
| 1900 | 397 | | 7.9% |
| 1910 | 368 | | −7.3% |
| 1920 | 399 | | 8.4% |
| 1930 | 554 | | 38.8% |
| 1940 | 639 | | 15.3% |
| 1950 | 1,173 | | 83.6% |
| 1960 | 3,227 | | 175.1% |
| 1970 | 5,460 | | 69.2% |
| 1980 | 5,688 | | 4.2% |
| 1990 | 6,294 | | 10.7% |
| 2000 | 9,448 | | 50.1% |
| 2010 | 13,603 | | 44.0% |
| 2020 | 14,084 | | 3.5% |
U.S. Decennial Census; 2010 2020

=== Racial and ethnic composition ===
Wauconda village, Illinois – Racial and ethnic composition Note: the US Census treats Hispanic/Latino as an ethnic category. This table excludes Latinos from the racial categories and assigns them to a separate category. Hispanics/Latinos may be of any race.
| Race / Ethnicity (NH = Non-Hispanic) | Pop 2000 | Pop 2010 | Pop 2020 | % 2000 | % 2010 | % 2020 |
|---|---|---|---|---|---|---|
| White alone (NH) | 8,047 | 10,317 | 9,981 | 85.17% | 78.84% | 70.87% |
| Black or African American alone (NH) | 38 | 107 | 155 | 0.40% | 0.79% | 1.10% |
| Native American or Alaska Native alone (NH) | 8 | 9 | 6 | 0.08% | 0.07% | 0.04% |
| Asian alone (NH) | 169 | 564 | 480 | 1.79% | 4.15% | 3.41% |
| Native Hawaiian or Pacific Islander alone (NH) | 0 | 2 | 0 | 0.00% | 0.01% | 0.00% |
| Other race alone (NH) | 11 | 20 | 36 | 0.12% | 0.15% | 0.26% |
| Mixed race or Multiracial (NH) | 50 | 160 | 459 | 0.53% | 1.18% | 3.26% |
| Hispanic or Latino (any race) | 1,125 | 2,424 | 2,967 | 11.91% | 17.82% | 21.07% |
| Total | 9,448 | 13,603 | 14,084 | 100.00% | 100.00% | 100.00% |

=== 2020 census ===
As of the 2020 census, Wauconda had a population of 14,084. The median age was 40.2 years. 24.4% of residents were under the age of 18 and 13.5% of residents were 65 years of age or older. For every 100 females there were 100.2 males, and for every 100 females age 18 and over there were 98.5 males age 18 and over.

99.0% of residents lived in urban areas, while 1.0% lived in rural areas.

There were 5,266 households in Wauconda, of which 35.2% had children under the age of 18 living in them. Of all households, 53.4% were married-couple households, 16.9% were households with a male householder and no spouse or partner present, and 23.0% were households with a female householder and no spouse or partner present. About 25.7% of all households were made up of individuals and 10.4% had someone living alone who was 65 years of age or older. The village had 3,656 families, the average household size was 3.18, and the average family size was 2.65.

There were 5,518 housing units at an average density of 957.32 per square mile (369.62/km^{2}), of which 4.6% were vacant. The homeowner vacancy rate was 1.5% and the rental vacancy rate was 3.7%. The population density was 2,443.44 inhabitants per square mile (943.42/km^{2}).

=== Income and poverty ===
The median income for a household in the village was $90,019, and the median income for a family was $108,968. Males had a median income of $64,628 versus $39,051 for females. The per capita income for the village was $42,504. About 2.1% of families and 4.4% of the population were below the poverty line, including 2.2% of those under age 18 and 11.1% of those age 65 or over.

== Government ==
Wauconda's local government consists of a Mayor, Clerk, and six member Board of Trustees who are elected to four-year overlapping terms of office. Village Board meetings are held on the first and third Tuesday of the month. Committee of the Whole meetings are held the first and third Tuesdays of the month.

The Village Administrator oversees all village departments and serves as a liaison between the village residents and the Board. The Administrator supervises the daily operations of the village with the assistance of staff, including the Chief of Police and the directors of Public Works, Finance, Human Resources/Risk Management, Information Technology, Environmental Quality, Building and Zoning, and Economic Development.

Fire/Rescue is provided by the Wauconda Fire Protection District, an independent taxing body covering all of the Village of Wauconda, all or parts of 10 other communities, 6 townships, and unincorporated parts of Lake and McHenry Counties.

There is a library on Main Street, called Wauconda Area Library, which serves the village.

== Transportation ==
Route 12 (north to south), IL 176 (west to east), and IL 59 serve as important roads for the village connecting its surrounding area.

The closest international airport is O'Hare International Airport and is located approximately 30 miles or around 40 minutes away. Midway International Airport is located approximately 49 miles away or around 70 minutes away.

== Events ==
On January 28, 2005, over 2,900 people participated in a snowball fight for ten minutes, setting a new world record for the most participants in such an event.

A weekly farmer's market is held on Main Street on Thursdays from July to September.

A three day long carnival takes place yearly in June named Wauconda Fest, which takes place by the skate park, near the Park District building and Wauconda High School.

Many other events are held throughout the year, such as an annual expo in February, inside of the Wauconda High School, Fourth of July fireworks held yearly on July 3, a Memorial Day parade, and outdoor movies.

== In popular culture ==
- The Blues Brothers was partially filmed in the village. A segment of the chase scene during the final third of the film featured the US-12 highway overpass over IL-176 (Liberty St.), as was a scene with the Blues Brothers driving onto Phil's Beach on North Main Street.
- In 2018, the village began to receive prank phone calls with the release of the superhero film Black Panther. This was because, in the film, the homophonous fictional country Wakanda serves as the primary setting.

== Sources ==
- Illinois cities
- Village of Wauconda website
