= List of Wurlitzer band organs =

Known band organ models once produced by the Rudolph Wurlitzer Company of North Tonawanda, New York, US, and information regarding currently active models and their locations include:

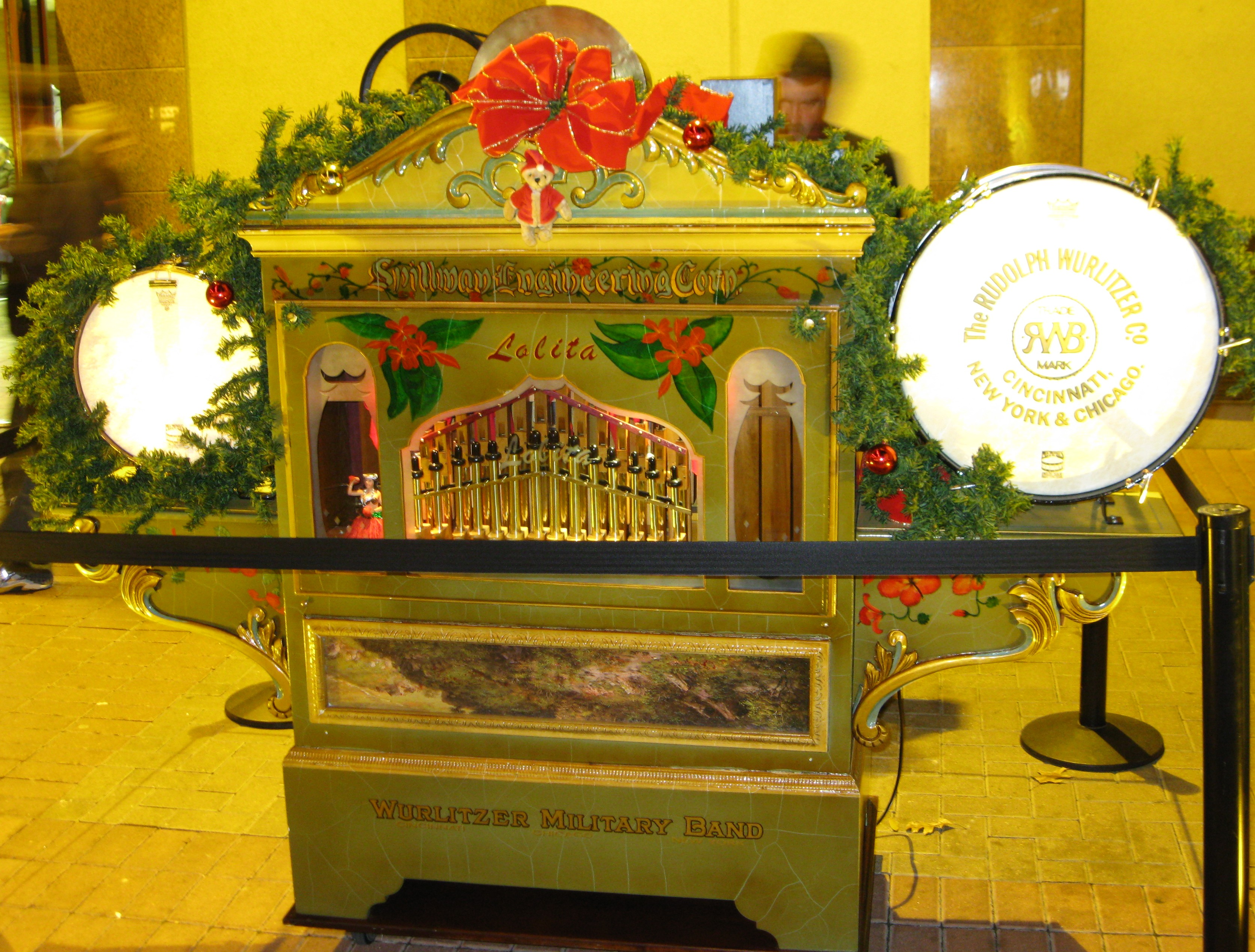
Wurlitzer 105 Band Organ (late model, Christmas decorated), Memphis Zoo.

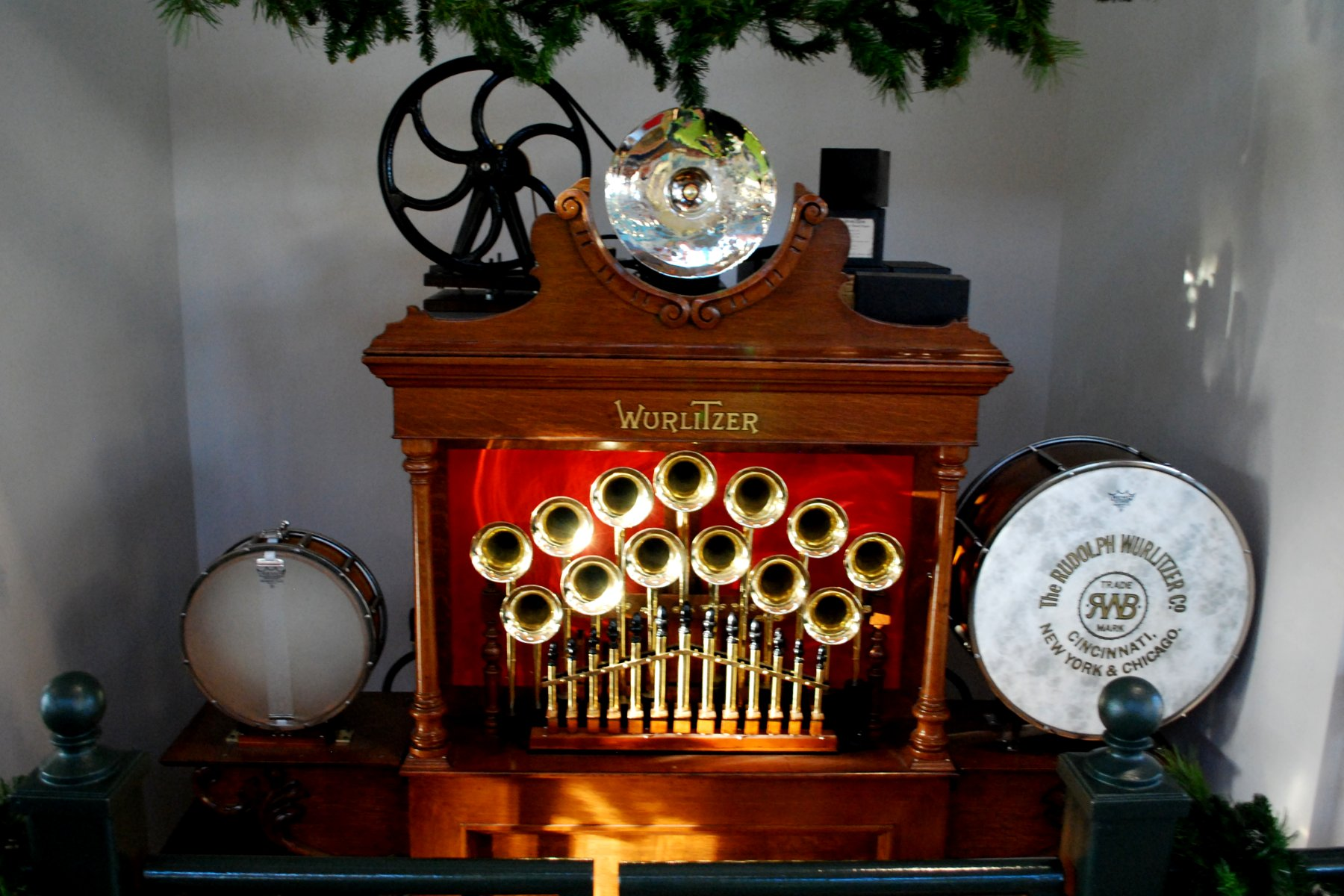
Wurlitzer 125 Band Organ (1924), Pullen Park Carousel. The early model 105 would appear identical to this, but without the drums.

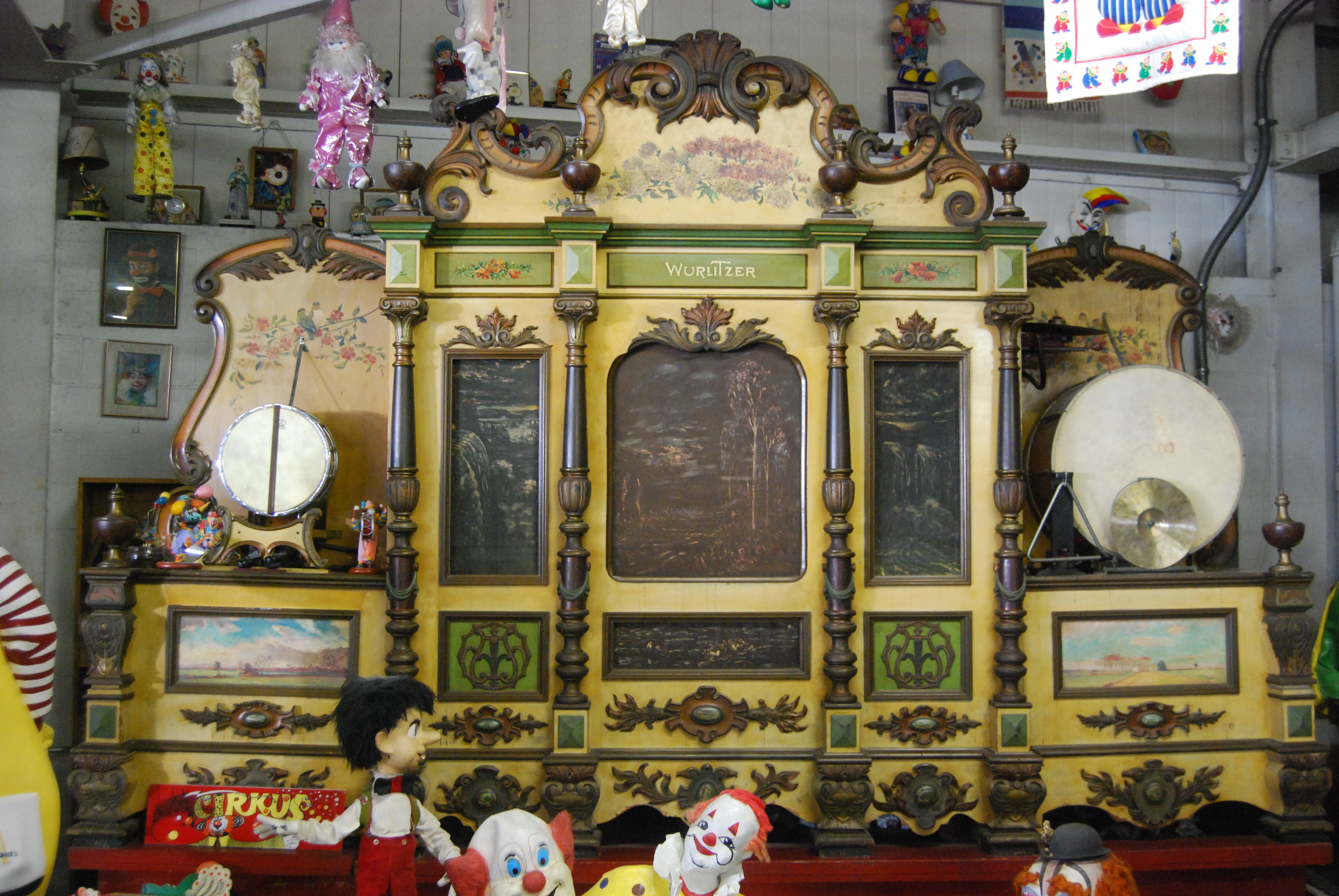
Wurlitzer 165 Band Organ with model 157 facade, American Treasure Tour.

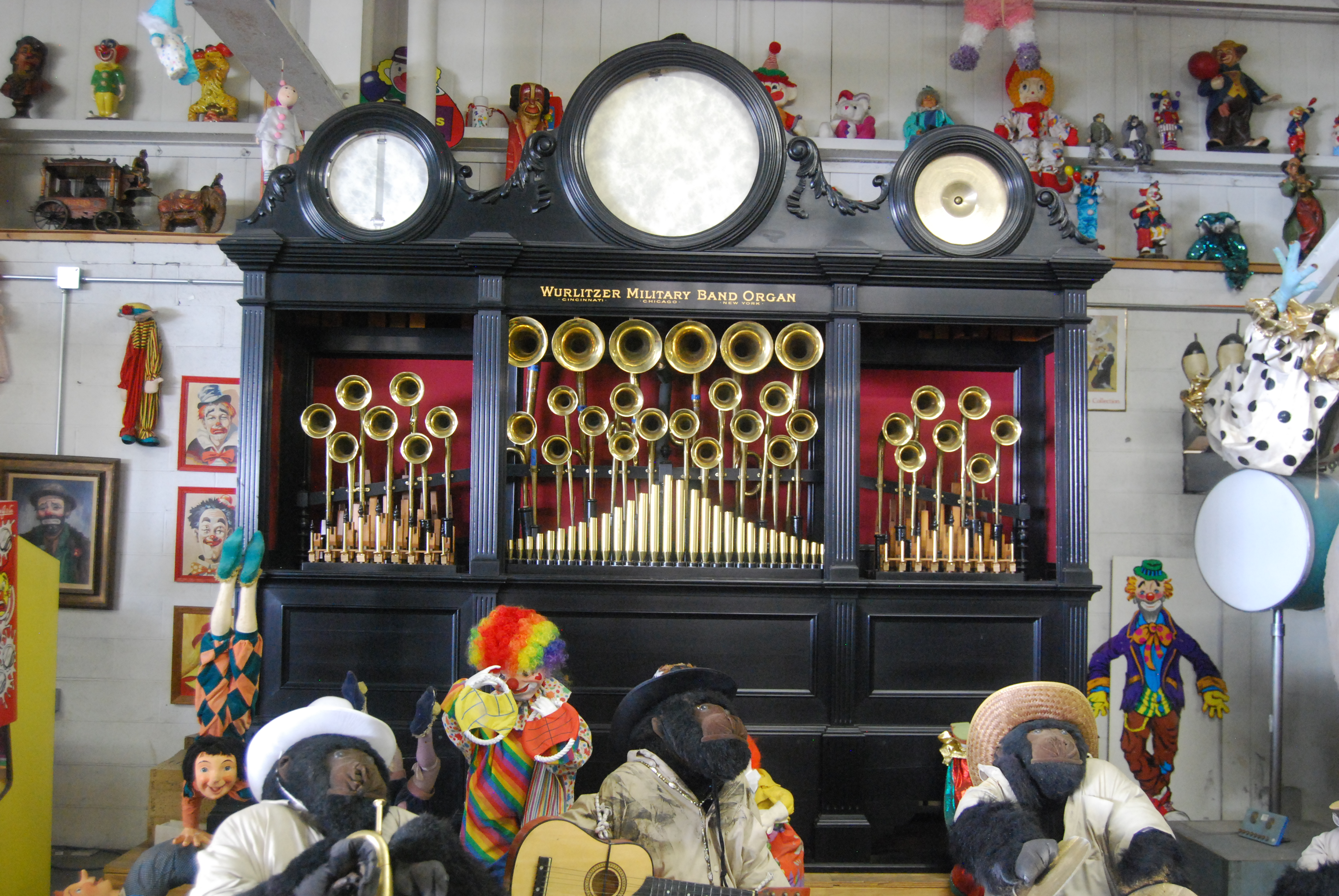
"The Mammoth" Wurlitzer Military Band Organ, 160, American Treasure Tour.

| Style: | Active organ information and locations: | |
|---|---|---|
| #18 | N/A | |
| #50 | American Treasure Tour (several), Oaks, Pennsylvania | |
| #65 | DeBence Antique Music World, 1261 Liberty Street, Franklin, Pennsylvania, US. It is a one of a kind model in which no other was known to be produced, was last publicly used on the Carousel at Cabana Beach Park in Washington, Pennsylvania | |
| Caliola | 1931 PTC Carousel, Idlewild Park, Ligonier, Pennsylvania, alongside a Wurlitzer 103 (see below), alternatively playing a roll on one organ, then playing the other organ while the first one rewinds Harold Warp's Pioneer Village, brass whistles, Minden, Nebraska; Jasper Sanfilippo Collection, ex Harold Shaner Collection, brass whistles with keyboard and drums, Victorian Palace, Barrington Hills, Illinois; Virginia Musical Museum, Williamsburg, Virginia; Chris Carlisle Collection, Missouri, from Lenny Marvin movie prop house collection, Los Angeles; Knoebels Amusement Resort, Elysburg, Pennsylvania Only plays on COAA Band Organ Rallies Herschell Carrousel Factory Museum 1916 #1 Special Carrousel, North Tonawanda, New York, plays alongside a Wurlitzer 146-A (see below), alternatively playing a roll on one organ, then playing the other organ while the first one rewinds, has keyboard Unknown Year, American Treasure Tour Collection, Oaks, Pennsylvania | |
| #103 | 1931 PTC Carousel, Idlewild Park, Ligonier, Pennsylvania (facade made by Artizan, nicknamed "The Wurlitzan"), alongside a Wurlitzer Caliola (see above), alternatively playing a roll on one organ, then playing the other organ while the first one rewinds Flying Horses Carousel, Oak Bluffs, Massachusetts, US; Cedar Point Sandusky, Ohio, 1925 Dentzel carousel, in storage Nevada City Music Hall | |
| #104 | Merry - Go - Round museum, non-operational Bronson Collection, Michigan; Private Collection, DesPlaines, Il Chris Carlisle Collection, Missouri, "Hot Lips Hoolihan" from Paul Eakins Collection | |
| #105 | (Note: Two completely different instruments were given the model designation 105 by Wurlitzer. Early 105s were essentially the model 125 but without percussion. An example is located in the Sanfillipo collection in Illinois. Later, the more familiar style 105, with wooden trumpets, was developed.) Jasper Sanfilippo Collection, Victorian Palace, Barrington Hills, Illinois (early model); Knoebels Amusement Resort, Elysburg, Pennsylvania Only plays on COAA Band Organ Rallies; Museum Carousel, Museum of Carousel Art and History, Sandusky, Ohio, US, turns on and off with carousel DeBence Antique Music World, 1261 Liberty Street, Franklin, Pennsylvania, US. Storybook Land, Egg Harbor Township, New Jersey, US, under restoration | |
| #106 | American Treasure Tour, Oaks, Pennsylvania, Restored | |
| #125 | 1901 Parker Carousel, Heritage Center of Dickinson County, Abilene, Kansas, US Private Collection, Illinois, from Arnold Marcus Chernoff Western History Collection, DeKleist made 125 updated by Wurlitzer, used by Buffalo Bill's Wild West Show 1900 Dentzel Carousel, Pullen Park, Raleigh, North Carolina, Pullen Park Carousel Gilson Collection, Wisconsin Roseneath Carousel, Roseneath, Ontario, Canada Knoebels Amusement Resort, Elysburg, Pennsylvania Carousel of Happiness, Nederland, Colorado, US Herschell Carrousel Factory Museum, North Tonawanda, New York, currently under restoration Pottstown Carousel, Pottstown, Pennsylvania, US, and it does not play, but is able to play. | |
| #126 | Private collection, under restoration | |
| #127 | No known | |
| #145-A | Olcott Beach Carousel Park, Olcott Beach, New York, plays constantly | Private Collection Corning, New York |
| #145-B | Lakeside Carousel, International Market World, Auburndale, Florida, US Private Collection, Fond du Lac, Wisconsin Private Collection, Nenana, Alaska | |
| #146-A | Dr. Floyd L. Moreland Carousel (added bells and duplex roll frame), Seaside Heights, New Jersey, US (serial #3673) restored, plays constantly 1922 Wurlitzer 146-A (serial #3415), Rosemount, Minnesota, US, restored 1920 Wurlitzer 146-A in Pueblo, Colorado at The City Park Rides 1911 C.W. Parker Carousel 1920 Allan Herschell Carousel, Ross Park, Binghamton, New York, US 1920 Allan Herschell Carousel, John Chavis Memorial Park, Raleigh, North Carolina, US 1912 Parker Carousel, Burnaby Village Museum (added bells), Burnaby, British Columbia, Canada, plays constantly Herschell Carrousel Factory Museum 1916 #1 Special Carrousel, North Tonawanda, New York, plays alongside a Wurlitzer Caliola (see above), alternatively playing a roll on one organ, then playing the other organ while the first one rewinds | |
| #146-B | 1925 Allan Herschell Carousel, Recreation Park, Binghamton, New York, US 1915 Wurlitzer 146-B Military Band Organ, at Musée_Mécanique, in Fisherman's Wharf, San Francisco, CA, US. Coin operated in a public museum/arcade. 1923 Wurlitzer 146-B with 153 facade Formerly nicknamed "The Snow Princess" S+K Curiosities Richfield, Minnesota, US, Restored. 1926 Wurlitzer 146-B Band Organ (modified with a Wurlitzer 153 Band Organ facade) at 1928 Paragon Park Carousel, Nantasket Beach, Hull, Massachusetts, US 1921 Wurlitzer Band Organ of J&A Carousel Music, Southwestern, Pennsylvania. All original and first appeared with Smokey's Greater Shows with the carousel. 1924 Spillman Engineering Carousel, DelGrosso's Amusement Park Tipton, Pennsylvania. plays constantly. 1925 PTC Carousel #72 Sonny's Place, Somers, Connecticut formerly owned by Jim Kenney, Clifton, New Jersey currently idle 1917 Broad Ripple Park Carousel, The Children's Museum of Indianapolis, Indianapolis, Indiana, US, currently idle Unknown Year, Private Collection in Gloversville New York, Restored. Unknown Year, American Treasure Tour Collection, Oaks, Pennsylvania, Restored. | |
| #147 | Private collection, under restoration | |
| #148 | DeBence Antique Music World, 1261 Liberty Street, Franklin, Pennsylvania, US Private collection, Ohio Liberty Antique Mall, Powell, OH American Treasure Tour Collection, Oaks, Pennsylvania Formerly from the Chris Carlisle Collection, Missouri, "Sara Jane" from Paul Eakins Collection. Whereabouts unknown. | |
| #150 | 1906 Bartholomew Murphy Carousel, City Park, New Orleans, Louisiana, US Jasper Sanfilippo Collection, Victorian Palace, Barrington Hills, Illinois, US Nevada City Music Hall (removed drums) Private collection, Hillside, New Jersey, US | |
| #153 | 1926 Dentzel Carousel, Kennywood Park, Pittsburgh, Pennsylvania, nicknamed "The Soul of Kennywood" plays constantly, oldest (possibly first) of its kind built in 1916 Matthew Jaro Collection, Gaithersburg, Maryland Dick Hack Collection, Annapolis, Maryland Music House Museum, Traverse City, Michigan Private collection, Dunbar, Pennsylvania, nicknamed "Hurdy", plays in local events RandyLand Retro Arcade, North Wildwood, nicknamed "Merry Ann", it does not play in public, but is able to play. 1898 Antique Carousel, Canobie Lake Park, Salem, New Hampshire, US 1913 Herschell Spillman Carousel, Greenfield Village, Dearborn, Michigan, US (Artizan 'C' with replica 153 façade converted to play Wurlitzer rolls) 1914 Bushnell Park Carousel, Bushnell Park, Hartford, Connecticut, US plays constantly 1925 Spillman Engineering Carousel, Tuscora Park, New Philadelphia, Ohio, US, plays constantly, modified with MIDI Jasper Sanfilippo Collection, Victorian Palace, Barrington Hills, Illinois, US Cedar Point, Sandusky, Ohio, US, Restored for the 150th anniversary of Cedar Point 2020 Dorney Park & Wildwater Kingdom, Allentown, Pennsylvania, US, plays constantly Hershey Park Hershey, Pennsylvania, plays constantly Jim Conklin Brantford, Ontario, operational, but currently idle Chris Carlisle Collection, Missouri, "Katy Lou" from Paul Eakins Collection American Treasure Tour Collection, Oaks, Pennsylvania (3, 2 under restoration) including one formerly owned by William E. Black, Chambersburg, Pennsylvania Dr. Ted's Musical Marvels: 11896 South US 231 Dale, Indiana, 47523, found by Ozzie Klavestad brand new in the shipping crate 1914 Mangels-Illions Grand Carousel, 'Special' facade Columbus Zoo and Aquarium, Columbus, Ohio, US, plays upon request Buffalo Heritage Carousel, Canalside, Buffalo, New York. Currently on display at the Herschell Carrousel Factory Museum in North Tonawanda, New York until restoration work on the carousel is complete DeBence Antique Music World, 1261 Liberty Street, Franklin, Pennsylvania, US. Originally used on the Carousel at Idora Park, Youngstown, Ohio, features metal bells on the front of the machine that accompanies the music | |
| #155 | 1909 Wurlitzer 155 Band Organ (model nicknamed "Monster"), Elitch Gardens Carousel, Kit Carson County Fairgrounds, Burlington, Colorado, US 1907 Gilson Collection, Middleton, Wisconsin 1905 Elise Roenigk Collection, Eureka Springs, Arkansas, rumoured first one built(built before commercial introduction in 1906) | |
| #157 | 1928 Spillman Carousel, Public Museum of Grand Rapids, factory converted to Caliola rolls and back to 165 rolls in restoration, Grand Rapids, Michigan, US 1926 PTC Carousel #79, nicknamed "The Queen of Kings Island", play from time to time, restored 2021-2022 according to video posted June 12, 2022 Kings Island, Cincinnati, Ohio, US Knott's Berry Farm Dentzel Carousel, Buena Park, CA, From Hersheypark, unrestored Arnold Chase Collection former King Arthur Carrousel 157 from Disneyland, factory converted to Caliola rolls and back to 165 rolls in restoration, Connecticut Bronson Collection, Dundee, Michigan Sanfilippo Collection, Victorian Palace, early one without clarinets and piccolos, Barrington Hills, Il Lakeside Amusement Park, sold in 1924 by the Berni Organ Company, Denver, Colorado, resides in the park owner's house Ex Torin, Ames, Milhous (sold for $185,000), and Andrews Collections, Sold May 2, 2015 at auction, whereabouts unknown ConeyIslandMusic.com, sold in 1924 by the Berni Organ Company a Wurlitzer agent to Luna Park, Coney Island for use on PTC #66, later under the ownership of the McCullough Brothers it was used on three other Coney Island carousels including Ward's Kiddieland and Feltman's, fully restored with a Rosa Patton decorated facade, McHenry, Il. Now owned by Tim Trager. Currently on loan at the Volo Auto Museum. | |
| #160 | Band Organ (model nicknamed "Mammoth") American Treasure Tour, Oaks, Pennsylvania. There was another 160 from Joyland Amusement Park, but its whereabouts and conditions are unknown after the park closed permanently in 2006. | |
| #163 | N/A | |
| #164 | Only known surviving 164 left, Private Collection, "The General", from American Treasure Tour, Oaks, Pennsylvania. There were two other 164s built: One which was destroyed by fire and another whose whereabouts and condition are unknown. | |
| #165 | 1914 Undisclosed location, in storage 1915 Jasper Sanfilippo, Victorian Palace, Barrington Hills, Illinois (serial #2943) 1916 American Treasure Tour Collection, Oaks, Pennsylvania. (serial #2992) formerly owned by William E. Black, Chambersburg, Pennsylvania. 1917 Circus World Museum - Baraboo, Wisconsin (serial #3030) only coin operated Wurlitzer 165 in the country. 1918 American Treasure Tour Collection, Oaks, Pennsylvania. (serial #3106) (former West View Park carousel organ) 1918 Santa Cruz Beach Boardwalk, Santa Cruz, California., on its 1911 Looff carousel; modified with MIDI (serial #3124) 1921 Robert Gilson, Middleton, Wisconsin. (serial #3378) 1921 Arnold Chase, Hartford, Connecticut. (serial #3358) 1922 Winstead family, Warwick, Rhode Island. (serial #3437) 1924 Glenn Thomas, Belle Mead, New Jersey (serial #3629) from John Davis carousel Lincoln Park, Los Angeles, California. 1925 Glen Echo Park, Glen Echo, Maryland., on its 1921 Dentzel carousel (serial #3779) factory conversion to caliola rolls and back to 165 rolls in restoration 1939 American Treasure Tour Collection, Oaks, Pennsylvania. (serial #4338) Constructed in 1927 incorporating a #157 front w/o lights, sold in 1939 to the Davis Carousel in Griffiths Park, Los Angeles. 1910s Wurlitzer 165 band organ on the 1997 Alderdi Eder carousel, replica of its 1900 predecessor, San Sebastián, Basque Country. Modified with MIDI and still functions. It's located at the Alderdi Eder gardens and both the carousel and the organ move to the Playa de la Concha (San Sebastián) on summer for the fireworks display during the Semana Grande de San Sebastián. | |
| #166 | Two built: One destroyed by fire, another whose whereabouts and condition are unknown | |
| #175 | One known 175, located at the American Treasure Tour Collection in Oaks, Pennsylvania, sold to Broadway Roller Rink, Denver, Co in 1918 | |
| #180 | Jasper Sanfilippo Collection, Victorian Palace, Barrington Hills, Illinois (serial #3439; 1922), first 180 built Nevada City Music Hall, Virginia City, Montana; factory conversion to Caliola/A.P.P rolls, converted to 165 rolls by Art Reblitz, keyboard equipped; no façade. (serial #4182; 1929), originally sold to St. Mary's Catholic Church, Amsterdam, New York Alan Bies & Steve Boehck, Houston, Texas.; plays Caliola/APP rolls. (serial #4275; 1930), last 180 built | |

== See also ==
- Rudolph Wurlitzer Company
- North Tonawanda Barrel Organ Factory
