= Elgin District (United Methodist) =

Coordinates: 42.0385°N 88.2815°W

The Elgin District is a geographic area within the Northern Illinois Annual Conference of the United Methodist Church and is led by a District Superintendent. With its administrative offices located in Elgin, Illinois, the district encompasses both urban and rural congregations, large and small. The current superintendent is Rev. Darneather Murph-Heath.

The district's jurisdiction covers sixty-five local churches, led by seventy-two elders, deacons and licensed local Pastors. The sixty-five churches include two federated congregations, three Hispanic congregations and seven Korean congregations ranging in size from 15 to 1,400 members.

The geographic area is fairly large and is broken down into the following by county:

- All of McHenry County
- Lake County west of Interstate 94, north of and including Lake Bluff
- Kane County north of Illinois Route 64 and east of Illinois Route 47
- DuPage County north of Illinois Route 64
- Cook County west of Interstate 294
