= Barrington United Methodist Church =

Coordinates: 42.11226°N 88.17603°W

- Barrington United Methodist Church
- Location: Barrington, Illinois
- Country: United States
- Denomination: United Methodist

History
- Founded: 1840

Specifications
- Capacity: 500

Administration
- District: Elgin

Clergy
- Pastor: Rev. Matthew Johnson

Barrington United Methodist Church, Barrington, Illinois, is an historic United Methodist Church congregation in the Northern Illinois Conference.

It is one of the oldest churches in the conference, tracing its roots back to the frontier circuit riders and one of the first Methodist classes in the Fox River valley area. The church is currently one of the largest churches in the Northern Illinois conference and the second largest in the Elgin District.

The church's current building along with its large steeple is a familiar landmark rising above the horse farms and mansions in the surrounding hills and prairies known colloquially as the Barrington Area.

== Frontier Church ==
=== Dundee Circuit ===
The church's history can be traced back to the year 1833 at the close of the Blackhawk War, when the treaty with the Native Americans removed most of the Native Americans to the reservations west of the Mississippi and opened the northern prairies of Illinois for settlement.

From the barren New England states came the “Yankee Pioneers” and their families, seeking land and new opportunities. They came first to Chicago, then out to the prairies, buying their land for $1.25 an acre. The first families that came to the Barrington Area arrived between the years 1834-1840.

The Methodist Preachers rode across the Alleghenies with the pioneers, and many historians agree that these Methodist men of God, the remarkable breed of men known as the circuit riders, were greatly responsible for bringing order to the new frontier.

Early frontier Methodism was organized into classes of around 12 persons, who usually met at private homes once a week to review their sins, pay their tithes and receive spiritual encouragement from their lay leader. Their circuit rider preacher would come to town, usually once a month.

The first Methodist class or group of this kind in the Barrington vicinity was organized in 1840 at Barrington Center, in the Dundee Circuit. It had 8 members, including the Class Leader, John Allen. This group worshiped first in homes, then for 13 years in a stone school-house, which was located at the corner of Bateman and Algonquin Roads.

=== Barrington Center Church ===
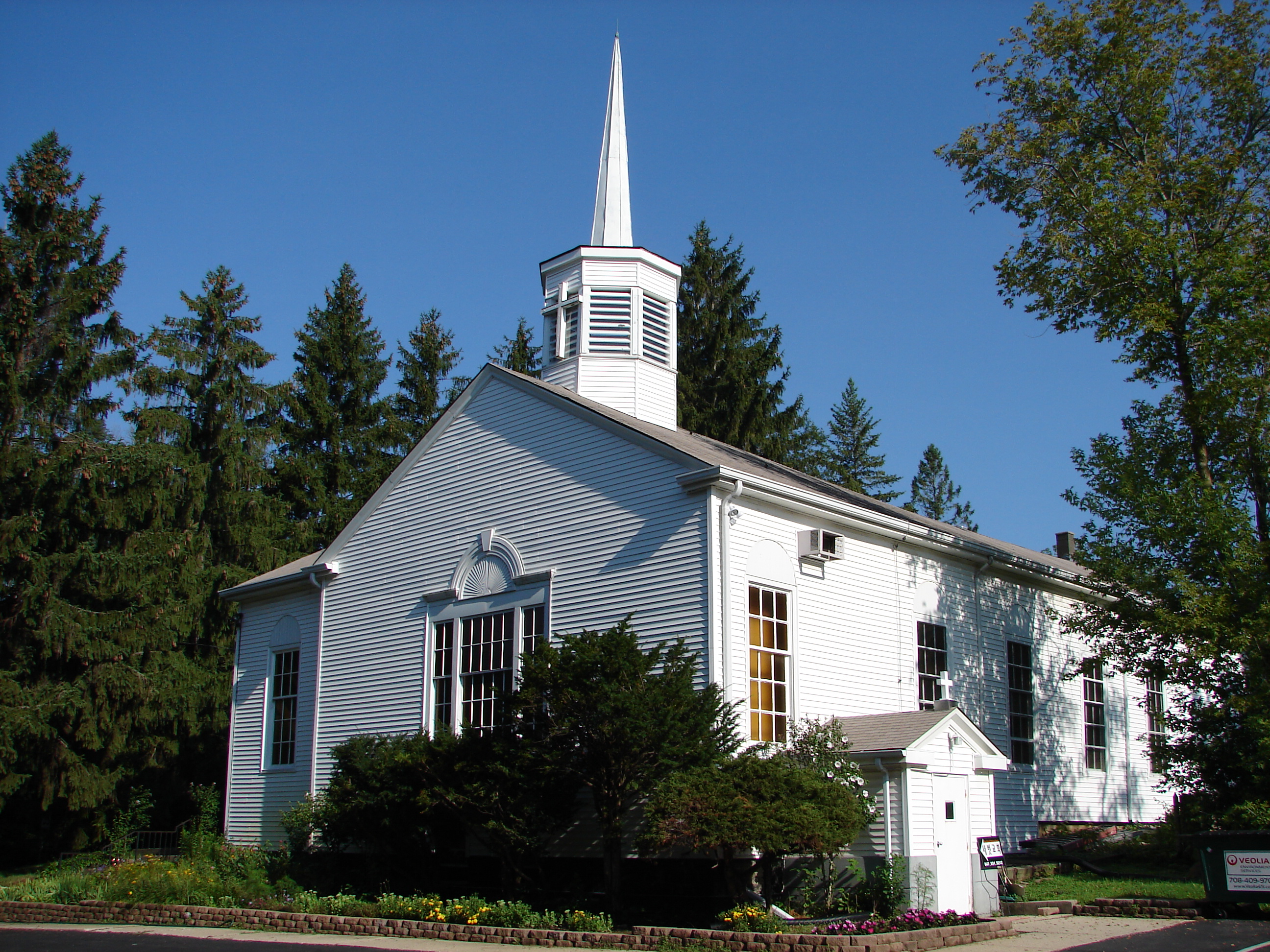
Barrington Center Church Google Street View

In 1853 a church, known as the Barrington Center Church, was built on the corner of Old Sutton Road and Dundee Road, in Miller’s Grove, (now Barrington Hills.) It was, a plain, neat frame edifice 34 feet by 52 feet, with a short steeple and a bell. Known as the Barrington Methodist Episcopal Society, the congregation flourished, and in 1858 was considered to be the strongest church in the Dundee Circuit with a membership of 85.

This church building still stands today on Illinois Route 68, repaired and enlarged with a picturesque cemetery beside it. Many of the early Methodist pioneers are buried there. Today it houses the New Friends Wesleyan Church, a Korean congregation. During the Civil War, this church was the gathering place for the entire rural area, and was used as a recruiting station. A large boulder stands in the church yard with a bronze tablet containing all of the names of the men in this area who fought in the Civil War and were recruited from this church in 1860.

== Village Church ==
=== Barrington Station Church ===
The Northwestern Railroad came to the Barrington area in 1854, and more families begin moving to the small village, or “Barrington Station” as it was called then. Construction was begun in 1858 on a new church, more centrally located, at the corner of Ela and Franklin streets, site of the present St. Anne Catholic Church.

The church, a simple white frame colonial building complete with bell tower and spire, was finished in 1859. The bell was brought from the old Center church and installed with great ceremony. The new Barrington Station Church would seat about 125 persons and cost around $2,000. For several years the same pastor would preach in both churches, in the Center mornings and at the Station in the afternoon.

This new church served the community for over 12 years. By 1871, the year of the Great Chicago Fire, the town of Barrington Station had prospered and a larger church was needed. At this time, the church had 84 members and 6 probationary members. The Station Church was sold to the Catholics for $550 and became the first St. Anne Church. The ladies of the church were able to accumulate enough money to purchase a lot on Cook Street on which to erect a new church.

=== Cook Street Church ===
The new church on Cook Street in downtown Barrington was dedicated on December 22, 1872 with great fanfare. The building was immensely beautiful by the standards of the day, a two-story white frame building with two spires, and stained glass Gothic windows. The church and its furnishings, including a fine $500 organ, cost about $4,000. Services were lit by 87 oil lamps and the congregation was kept warm with two large drum stoves.

For fifty-seven years, the Cook Street Church was the focal point of many church and community activities. Records show that the downstairs meeting hall was in great demand for temperance meetings, literary societies, Epworth League, the Grand Army of the Republic meetings, lectures, concerts and a youth Social Center. As the years rolled by, changes had to be made. The steeple was lowered because it had been struck by lightning twice and twice rebuilt. Electric lights and a furnace were installed. In 1915, extensive improvements were made in the auditorium.

== The Church in the Heart of the Community ==
=== Hough Street Church ===
Once again, the congregation outgrew its facilities, and in 1925 plans were begun for a new church building. The Rev. H. L. Buthman, affectionately known as "Boots", was assigned to the church. A young man with fresh ideas, he quickly undertook a campaign to raise the necessary funds with a goal of raising $60,000. All was going according to plan until the Great Depression hit in 1929. The bank where the church's funds were held closed and Rev. Buthman fell gravely ill. When visited by parishioners, the young minister said that he was "ready to go" if it was his time, but that his only regret was that the building plans would be dropped and the new church would never be built or delayed for years.

A group of men from the church moved quickly to purchase a vacant building formerly used by the Zion Branch of the Evangelical Church. The building had at one time been used to store automobiles. The building was purchased for $700, to be remodeled into a new Methodist church. Robert Work, a well known Chicago architect, examined the building, built in 1880, and found it sound, with heavy oak timbers and peg construction. The lines were good and he designed it in the colonial style.

The old church originally faced Lincoln Street. A new foundation was built, and the whole church was lifted and moved to face Hough Street. The old bell was taken down from the Cook Street church and hung in the new belfry. The church was dedicated on January 25, 1931. As the membership grew, and more space was needed, two educational wings and a chapel were added, and class space was taken to build a balcony for additional seating.

Hough Street Church was known as “The Church in the Heart of the Community, with the Community at Heart” and out of its sense of service came many of the civil organizations and agencies that serve the area today.

=== Algonquin Road Church ===
On the afternoon of October 28, 1998 a mass of black smoke expanded over the Barrington village center darkening an otherwise bright, blue Autumn sky. Word quickly spread that the historic white church on Hough Street was on fire. The cause was traced to the use of a heat gun that ignited old, dry wood during remodeling work.

For the next few years, the congregation became nomadic, meeting in school gymnasiums and the basements of neighboring churches. The site for the new building was chosen at the corner of Illinois Route 59 and Algonquin Road in Barrington Hills, and the ground breaking was celebrated on July 1, 2001.

Construction started in early 2002, with the first service in the new sanctuary being held on March 2, 2003. A new 42-rank pipe organ by the Wicks Organ Company was installed in September, 2003, and the Service of Consecration was celebrated on Sunday, October 5, 2003. The current church building stands less than three miles from the original school house at Algonquin and Bateman Roads where eight pioneers organized a Methodist meeting group in 1840, and about a mile from the 1853 church at Barrington Centre.

In line with its history of being a center-piece of the Barrington communities, the current church building hosts many community events and concerts, a preschool and kindergarten program, Boy Scout troops and Cub Scout packs, seminars and on-site training for students of Garrett-Evangelical Theological Seminary.

The congregation of Barrington United Methodist Church celebrated its 175th anniversary in 2015 with a series of events culminating in a special service on October 25 featuring a commissioned choral piece by composer Craig Phillips.

=== Leadership ===
Conference

- Northern Illinois Conference (United Methodist)
  - Bishop Dan Schwerin

District

- Prairie Central District
  - Wendy Hardin Hermann

Local Church (appointed clergy)

- Rev. David Lagos-Fonseca, Pastor

=== Organists ===
- Sibyl Sharp, FAGO, 1969-1997
- Sharon Lowery (interim), 2000-2003
- Jeffrey R. Neufeld, D.S.M., 2003-2018
- Michael Rees, 2019-2021
- Ricardo Ramirez, 2021-2023
- Alexander Zintchenko
