= Place de la Musique =

Coordinates: 42°10′47″N 88°12′41″W

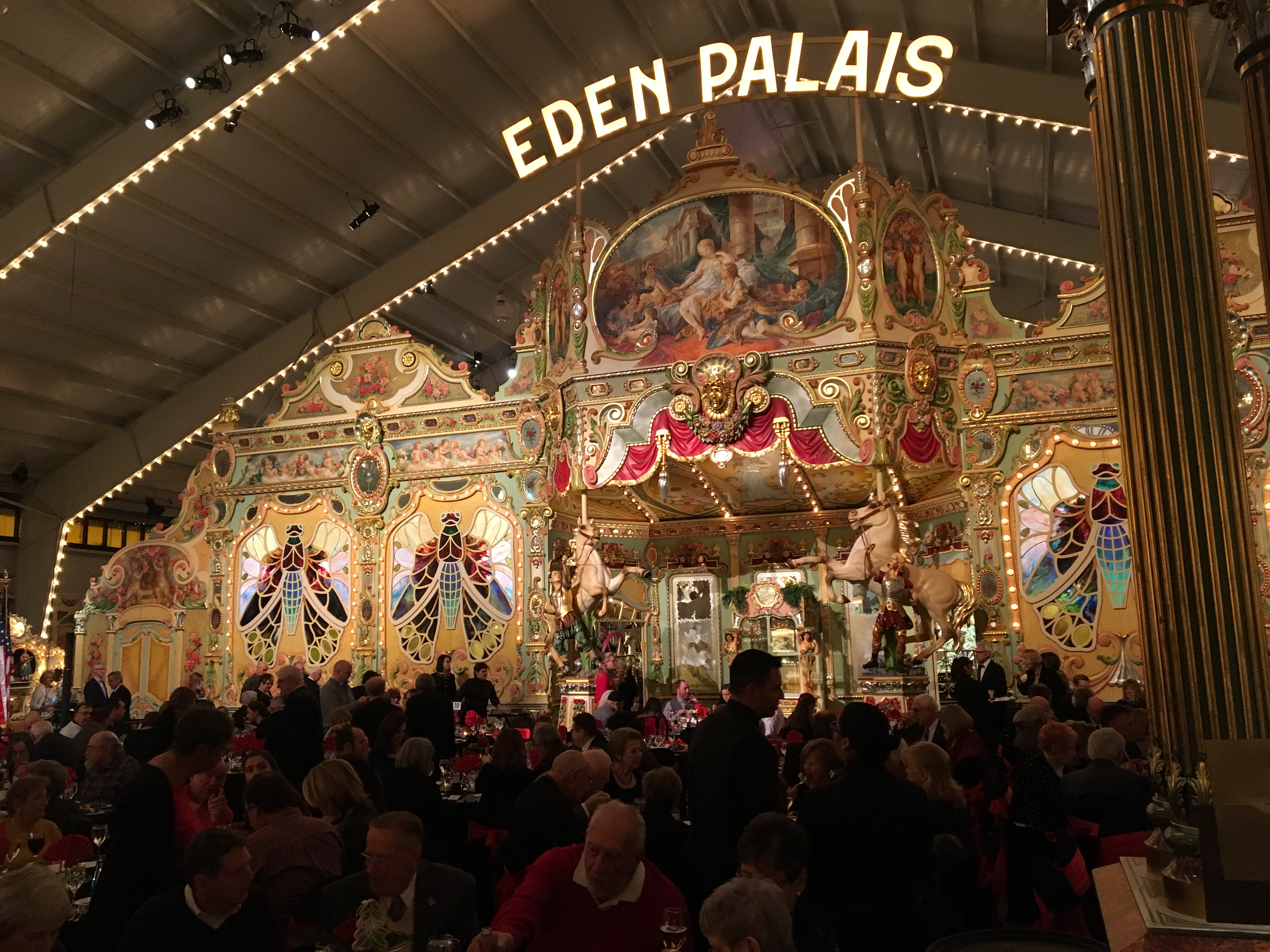
The Eden Palais salon carousel is one of several exhibits at the Place de la Musique.

The Sanfilippo Place de la Musique is a private museum in Barrington Hills, Illinois, United States, known for its collection of antique music machines, including phonographs, player pianos, fairground and band organs, calliopes, and a large theater pipe organ. It is located on the estate of Jasper and Marian Sanfilippo. It is sometimes referred to as the Sanfilippo Collection.

== Displays ==
=== Theater organ ===
The Wurlitzer company built the theater organ in 1927 as their Opus 1571. It is one of the largest theater pipe organs in the world, currently having about 80 ranks and approximately 5000 pipes. It was originally built for the Riviera Theatre in Omaha, Nebraska. It has been restored and expanded under David Junchen, after the museum installed it in a purpose-built music room.

=== Eden Palais salon carousel ===
The Eden Palais is a rare salon carousel built in 1890. It was purchased by the museum in 1987 and the building currently housing it was completed in 1997.

=== Steam locomotive ===
The foundation owns Victoria Jct. RR #18, a steam locomotive built in 1881 by Grant Locomotive Works (one of only two existing engines built by Grant). Built as a narrow-gauge engine, it served on various railroads, eventually serving in Henry Ford's Ford River Rouge Complex in Dearborn, Michigan (where it was converted to standard gauge), and then later displayed at the Henry Ford Museum.

=== Others ===
The museum owned a 1912 Hupfeld Phonoliszt-Violina Model A from 1983 to 2012.

== Location ==
The Place de la Musique is located in the Sanfilippo estate, which includes several buildings in which artefacts are stored, curated or displayed. The estate is known internationally for its collection of theater related objects. The Sanfilippo Foundation helps charities use the Sanfilippo Estate and its collections for fundraising efforts.

== See also ==
- List of music museums
