= American Treasure Tour =

Tourist attraction in Oaks, Pennsylvania

American Treasure Tour Museum
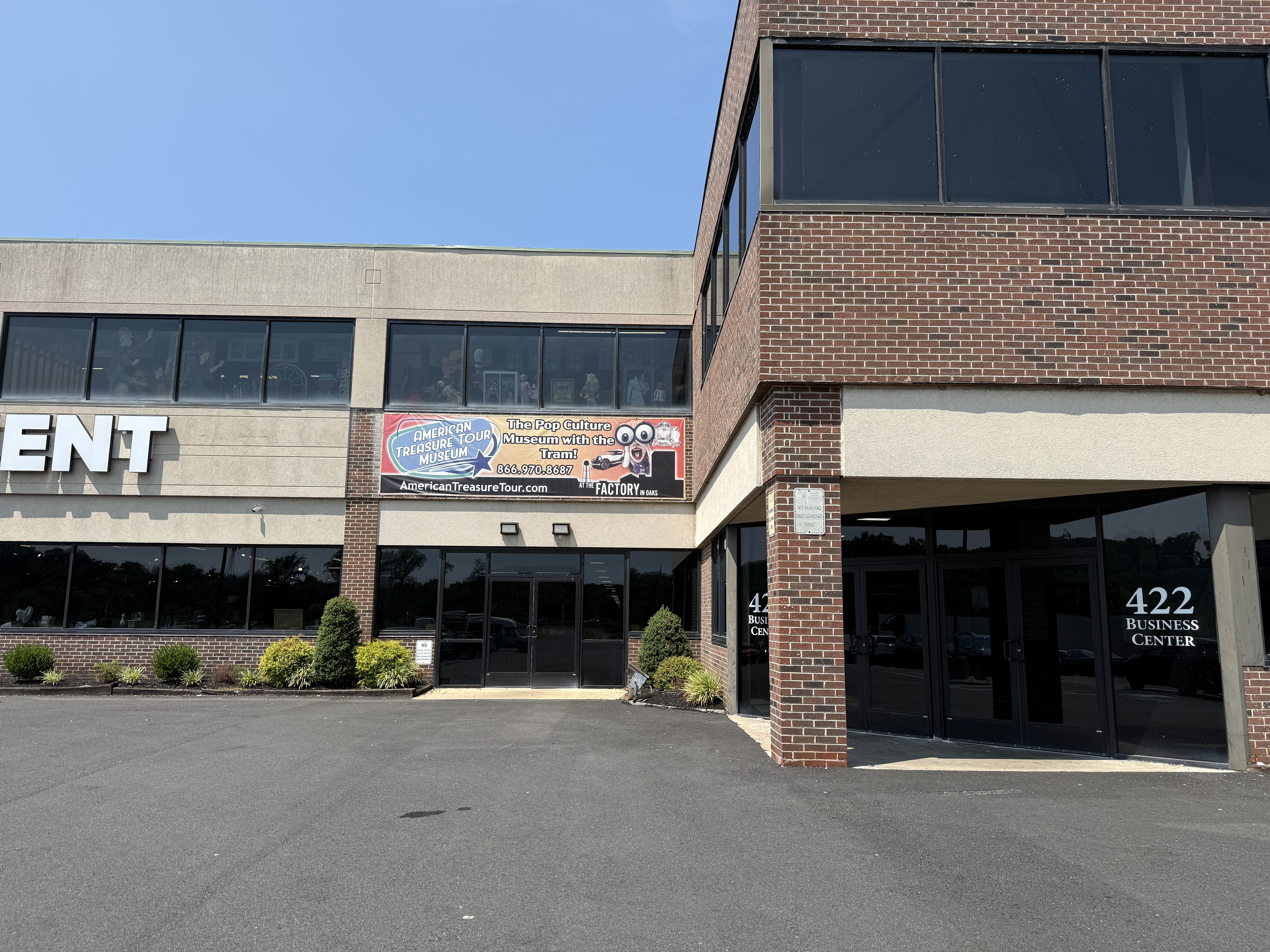
- Entrance to the American Treasure Tour Museum
- Location: Oaks, Pennsylvania
- Coordinates: 40°07′26″N 75°27′20″W
- Website: http://americantreasuretour.com/

The American Treasure Tour Museum is a tourist attraction established in 2010 and opened to the public for guided tours. Visitors travel through a large private collection that encompasses an eclectic variety of smaller collections. Included is one of the world's largest private collections of automatic music machines: nickelodeons, band organs, calliopes, photoplayers, and music boxes. There are also classic cars, circus art, dolls and dollhouses, and a large assortment of popular culture miscellanea. It is located in the 422 Business Center in the community of Oaks, Pennsylvania, west of Valley Forge National Historical Park just off of U.S. Route 422.

== Background ==
The collection is located in Oaks, Pennsylvania, in a former B.F. Goodrich tire factory building. The factory was opened in 1937 and active in tire production until its closure in 1986, shortly before Goodrich sold their production line, and the name of their brand, to the Michelin Company. The former plant has since been completely re-purposed. The first floor of the building is currently used for commercial space, including such businesses as the Arnold's Family Fun Center. Most of the second floor, however, is the repository for the collection that comprises the American Treasure Tour Museum. The building complex is 1.2 million square feet while the ATT comprises 100,000 square feet, about the size of a big-box store.

== The Collection ==
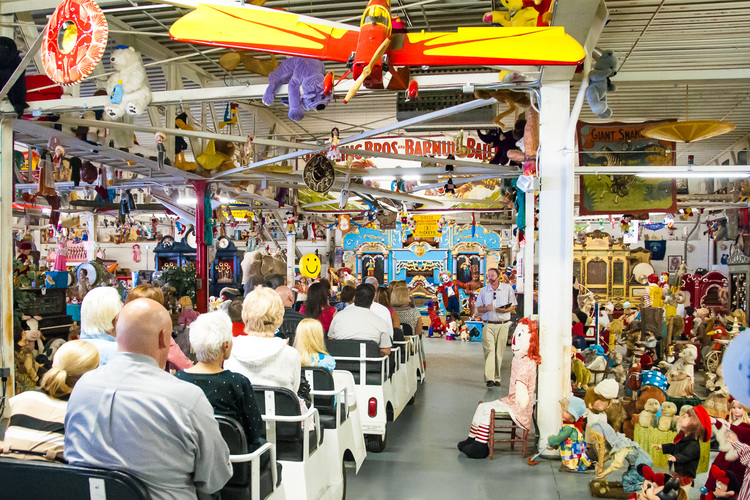
Visitors take a tram ride through the American Treasure Tour Museum

The ATTM has on display the private collection of one person, who remains anonymous at his request. The collection includes (but is not restricted to): carousel band organs, calliopes, nickelodeons (also known as orchestrions), movie posters and celebrity photographs, vinyl record albums (33-1/3, 48 and 78 speed), Edison cylinder players, antique and modern animated store displays, circus and clown art, pedal cars, model airplanes, and classic cars. A second element is the music box collection, on loan to the ATTM by the Music Box Society International (MBSI), an organization of aficionados of automatic music. The ATTM is the repository for over one hundred pieces from MBSI's extended collection. Many of these are on display and played for visitors. The MBSI has also utilized the ATTM as a site for group meetings.

== Layout ==
The tour consists of two parts: The self-guided Music Room, which houses the majority of the self-playing music machines in the museum and The Toy Box, which incorporates a tram ride.

=== The Music Room ===
The Music Room has record albums, movie posters and celebrity photographs covering the walls. Located in the room are a majority of the collection's nickelodeons, dolls, dollhouses, and photoplayers, as well as the Music Box Society International music boxes. Selected nickelodeons and instructional videos are played for visitors. Tours include the playing of numerous machines and brief historical stories told by the guide about the era during which the machines were popular. There are over 150 automatic music machines on display in the Music Room. Highlights among them include:

- Two Wurlitzer Harps - one in Style A, the other in Style B.
- Two Wurlitzer IX Electric Pianos (one of which is from the Paul Eakins collection, formerly the Gay 90's Village in St. Louis, and distinctive for its red keys).
- The Wurlitzer LX adorned with a novel 'wonder light' affixed at its top.
- The Mills Violano-Virtuoso DeLuxe, constructed with two violins and an internal piano.
- Wurlitzer Mandolin PianOrchestra Style 12, dominated by a 'wonder light' shaped like a peacock and composed of 37 violin and violoncello pipes, a piano, and a percussion section.
- Sextrola Style B, one of the last machines produced by the North Tonawanda Musical Instrument Works prior to its takeover by the Rand Company.
- Seeburg Style C, which dates to the early 1910s and the Style H, which is dominated by wooden statues named "Beauty" and "Strength".
- Seeburg Style R Pipe-Organ Orchestra Photo Player once complemented the silent films in a large theater, prior to the advent of sound on film.
- D.C. Ramey Piano Company Banjo Orchestra - a newer machine designed to emulate older machines.

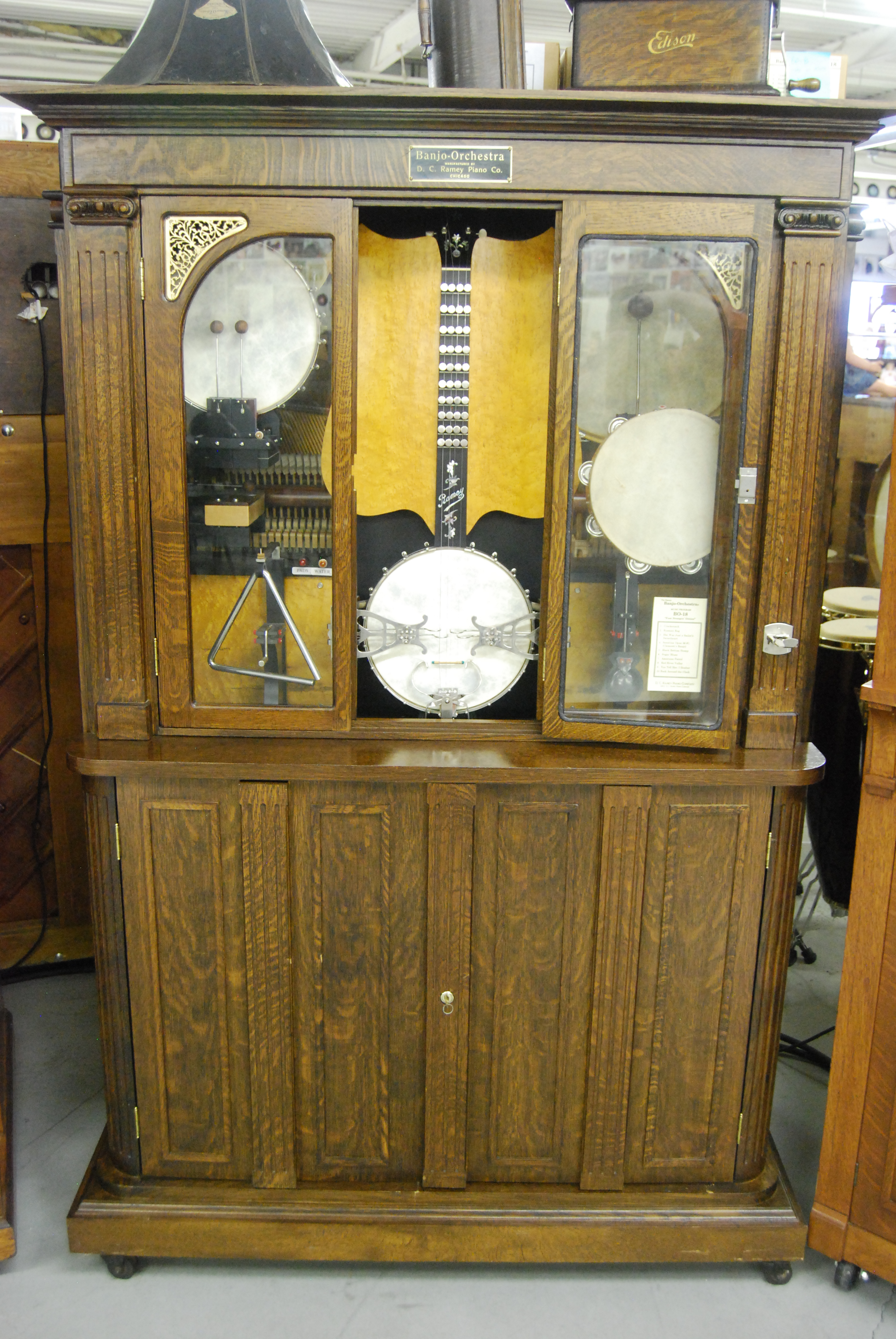
DC Ramey Banjo Orchestra

- The music box collection includes examples from the Baker Company, Mira, Stella, Regina, Criterion, Capitol Cuff, and numerous others, all of which were produced in the United States and Europe around the turn of the 20th century.
- Other nickelodeon's on display include: Seeburg Style A, Style C, Style E, Style F, Style G, Style L, Celesta. Berry Wood AOHR, Style 15, Style F. Wurlitzer 88 Note, Style A, Style AX, Mandolin-Sextette, Style SA.
- Also on display is a Link Trainer, created by the Edwin Link Jr, which incorporated nickelodeon technology for an early flight simulator.

=== The Toy Box ===
The Toy Box takes up the majority of the space in the American Treasure Tour Museum. Visitors are driven in an electric tram down lanes displayed with an eclectic collection of Americana on both sides and hanging from the ceiling. Tram tours are conducted with an audio track describing the items, including: automatons, model airplanes, classic cars, more automatic musical instruments, original artwork, movie memorabilia and Disneyana, stuffed animals, animated store displays, motorcycles, holiday displays and neon signage. Highlights include:

- Three of only 11 (possibly 12 or more) surviving Wurlitzer #165 band organs
- The only known surviving Wurlitzer #175 band organ

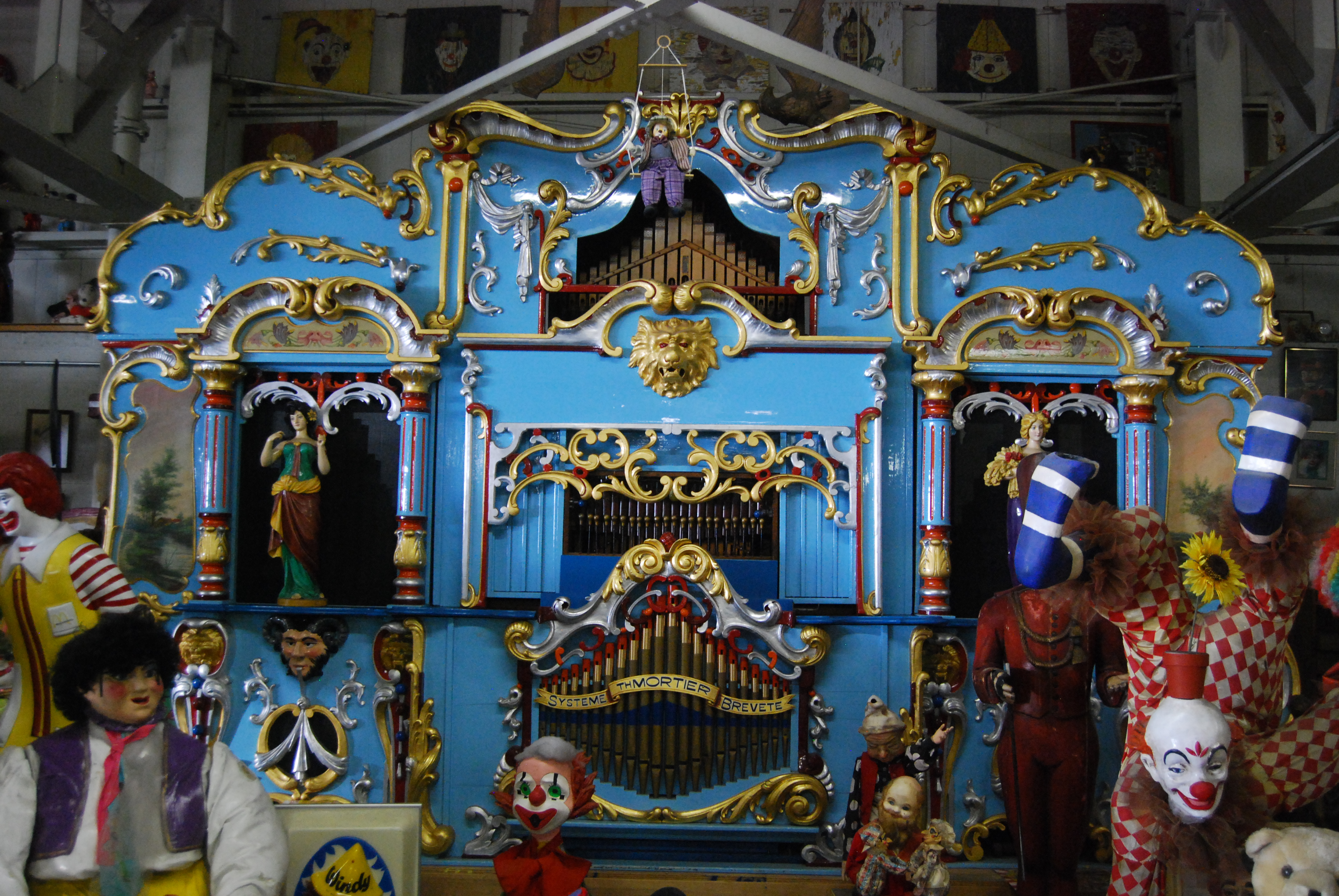
Th. Mortier Dance Hall Organ, The Emperor - Located in the American Treasure Tour

- "The Mammoth" Wurlitzer Military Band Organ, also known as a Wurlitzer Style #160
- "The Emperor" Th. Mortier Dance Hall Organ
- "Sadie Mae" Gavioli & Cie. band organ, formerly of the Paul Eakins collection
- A giant shoe used for a promotion in Manhattan's Madison Square Park to promote the short-lived cable network Wedding Central
- One of Eric Staller's Conference Bikes
- The 2009 Guinness Book of World Records-winning Popsicle Stick Structure - a castle created by one man
- Many classic cars, such as a 1905 Franklin, two Sears Motor buggies, two Vespa 400 automobiles, two 1956 Ford Thunderbirds, a 1954 Pennant Blue Corvette as well as more modern Corvettes, a 1922 Stanley Steamer, a 1924 Cadillac 7-seat sedan, a 1907 ABC, a 1914 Maxwell, a 1914 Liberty-Brush, a 1914 Woods Mobilette, a 1951 Crosley VC Hotshot, and over sixty others.
- The Lit Bros. Enchanted Colonial Christmas Village

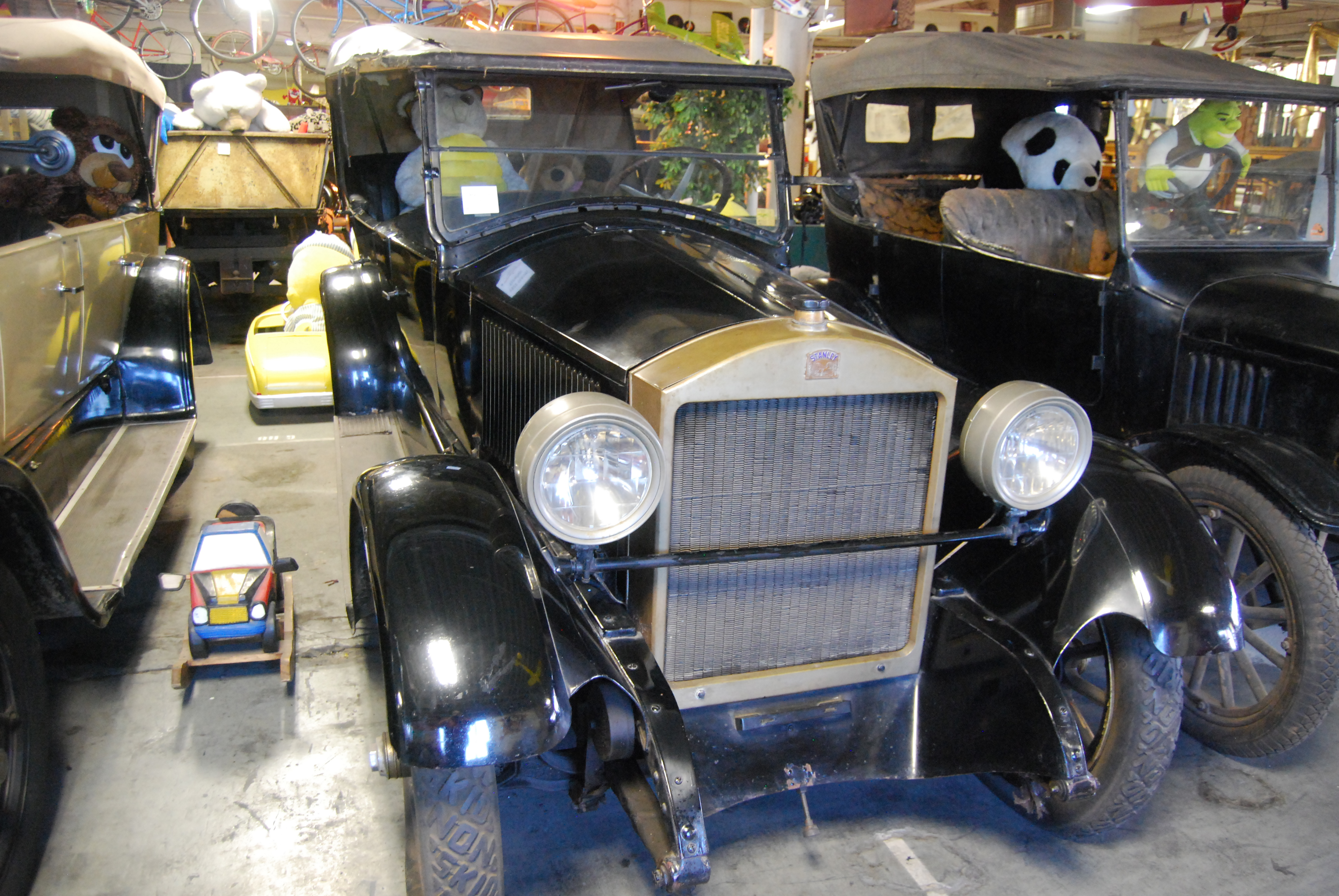
1922 Stanley Steamer

The anonymous owner of the collection that comprises the majority of the American Treasure Tour Museum (sans the MBSI collection) continues to regularly bring in new pieces, which are incorporated into the tours whenever space allows.

== See also ==
- List of music museums
