= Jasper Sanfilippo =

American businessman (1931–2020)

Jasper Baratta Sanfilippo, Senior
- Born: Gaspare Baratta Sanfilippo; March 26, 1931; Chicago, Illinois, U.S.
- Died: January 28, 2020 (aged 88) Barrington Hills, Illinois, U.S.
- Occupation: Businessman
- Known for: former president and CEO of John B. Sanfilippo & Son, Inc.
- Spouse: Marian Fabsits
- Children: 5

Jasper B. Sanfilippo, Sr. (born Gaspare Baratta Sanfilippo March 26, 1931 – January 28, 2020) was an Illinois-based businessman, industrialist and philanthropist.

== Early life and education ==
Jasper Sanfilippo was born in Chicago, Illinois in March 1931 to John Battista and Rosalie Baratta, the former of Sicilian ancestry. He attended Lake View High School and graduated in 1953 with a degree in mechanical engineering from the University of Illinois. After graduation, he served in the United States Army around the time of the end of the Korean War.

== Business life ==
Sanfilippo started working at his father's nut business, John B. Sanfilippo & Son, Inc. when he was nine years old. In 1963 upon his father's death, when the company's annual sales were just $383,000, he assumed day to day control. Over the subsequent decades Sanfilippo built the business into first a regional, and then national, major nut supplier, selling both branded and private label nuts and related products to primarily supermarkets, mass merchandisers, convenience stores and foodservice providers.

A main focus of Sanfilippo's efforts was on the mechanical shelling and processing of a variety of nuts. He led the engineering of, and the design and installation of, the company's shelling facilities throughout the United States (pecans in Texas, almonds and walnuts in California, peanuts in the Southwestern U.S.), as well as the final processing facility in Elgin, Illinois, a one million square foot facility acquired from Panasonic for $48 million and opened in 2007.

In 1991 Sanfilippo took the company public in becoming listed on the Nasdaq as JBSS with then annual revenues of $151 million.

Sanfilippo utilized strategic acquisitions over the decades to grow and expand the business. In 1995 Sanfilippo acquired the Fisher nut brand from Procter & Gamble, which later became the best-selling recipe nut brand in the United States.

In 2006, after serving as President and Chief Executive Officer of the company for 24 years, Sanfilippo retired from active management of the business and was succeeded by his son Jeffrey Sanfilippo.

== Collection and charitable activities ==
Sanfilippo was also well known for his museum collection, Sanfilippo Place de la Musique, at his home and estate in Barrington Hills, Illinois, consisting of collections of music boxes, automatic pianos and orchestrions, as well as antique locomotives, circus carousels, slot machines, penny arcades and steam engines. The museum is frequently used by local and regional charities to raise millions of dollars.

As a major collector Sanfilippo was a member of the Musical Box Society International (MBSI), Automated Musical Instrument Collectors Association (AMICA), the Carousel Organ Association of America (COAA) and the Coin Operated Collectors Association (COCA).

== Personal life ==
Sanfilippo married Marian Fabsits in Chicago on July 14, 1956. The Sanfilippo's have five children, two of whom are actively involved in running JBSS.
