= Berry-Wood A.O.W. Orchestrion =

Musical instrument

The Berry-Wood A.O.W. Orchestrion is a musical instrument that comprises a piano, 34 wood flute pipes, 34 wood violin pipes, a tambourine, a triangle, a cymbal, a wood block, castanets, a bass drum, a snare drum, a marimba, metal bells and a mandolin rail. It is classified as a player piano that operates via a paper roll and was built by the Berry-Wood piano company of Kansas. It features three stained glass panels and two decorative lamps.

The last functioning one of its kind in existence is housed in the DeBence Antique Music World Collection. It was once stated to be "particularly adapted for use in moving picture houses."
