= Musical Box Society International =

Non-profit organization

The Music Box Society International (MBSI) is a non-profit organization dedicated to the enjoyment, study and preservation of all automatic musical instruments.

== History ==
According to a 1987 article in The New York Times, the Music Box Society International first formed in the early 1900s to preserve and conserve existing examples of music boxes.

According to the MBSI's own website, the organization was founded in 1949. It numbers several thousand members with representation in 50 US states and nineteen other countries. It focuses on music boxes of all sizes, from small, hand-held wind-up boxes, to fairground organs or room sized orchestrions, including musical clocks and snuff boxes, singing bird boxes, player pianos (reproducing pianos, nickelodeons), and automatic musical instruments of any kind.
