= Virginia Musical Museum =

Coordinates: 37.33764°N 76.75106°W

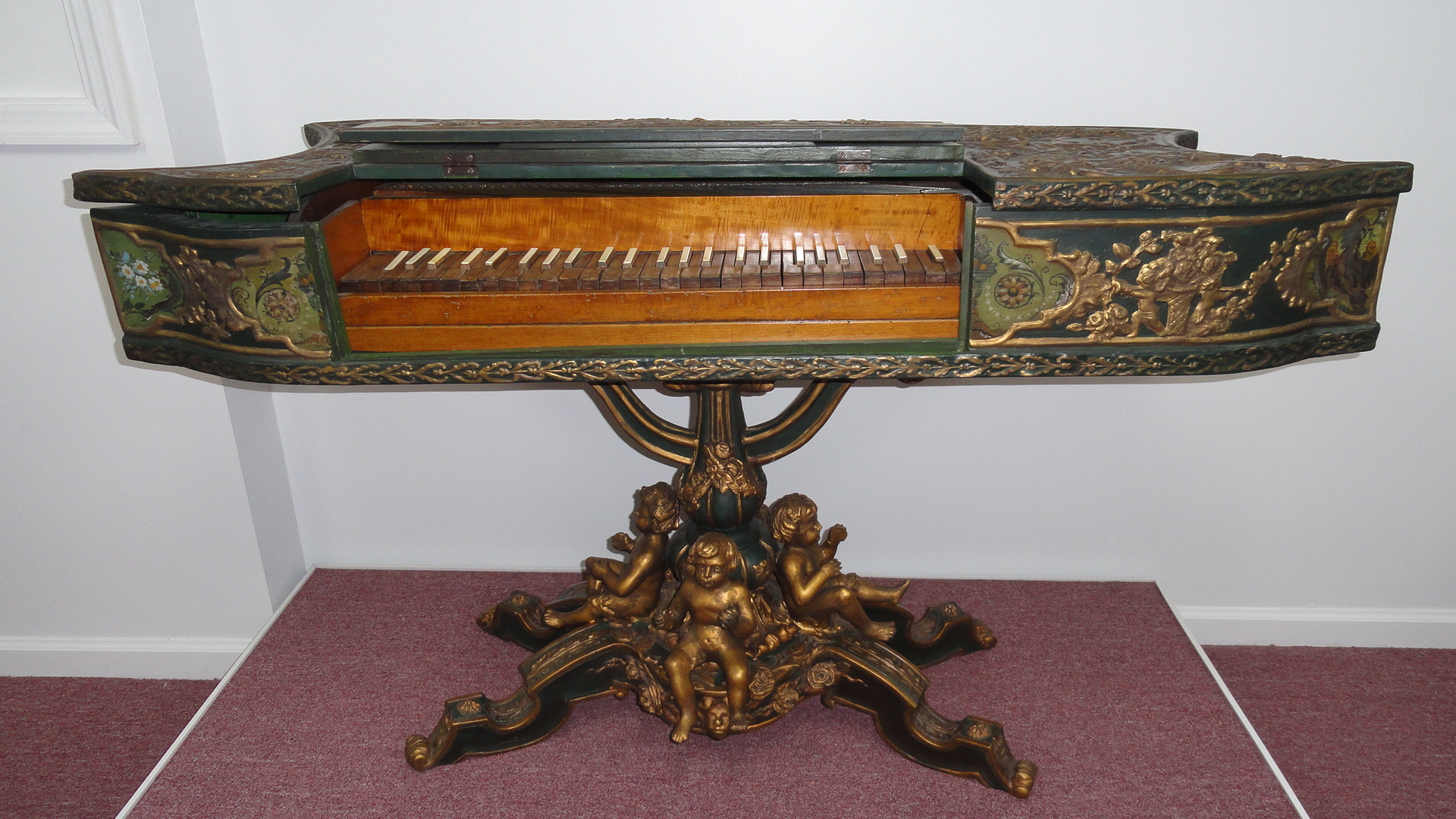
1780, Pianoforte, Origin: Unknown, purchased in Baltimore, Maryland

The Virginia Musical Museum is a museum located in Williamsburg, Virginia, United States. A collection of over forty years is combined with donations from famous Virginia music artists. Making up the museum are rare, antique musical instruments, mechanical music machines, phonographs and many personal items from Virginia artists. The museum opened its doors to the public on June 22, 2013.

== History ==
In 1963, Jesse (Buddy) and Peggy Parker purchased their first music box, starting the collection. The couple started collecting instruments from around the world, but mostly from Virginia. The history of music in Virginia can be seen through the artists, objects and instruments on display.

== Collections ==
Virginia Music Artists is the largest collection, with personal items from Patsy Cline, Ella Fitzgerald, Wayne Newton, Bruce Hornsby, Ralph Stanley, The Statler Brothers, Pearl Bailey, Roy Clark, Ricky Van Shelton, Gene Vincent, Phil Vassar, Jimmy Fortune and other famous Virginia artist

The Piano Gallery exhibit contains instruments showing the evolution of the piano, starting from the cimbalom and onward to the modern grand piano. One of the rarest keyboards in the gallery is a 1770 Joshua Shudi harpsichord, of which there are only two known in existence.

The phonographs exhibit contains phonographs made by Thomas Edison and RCA Victor with a sample of Edison's tin foil phonograph, and portrays the history of recorded music.

The nickelodeon museum displays nickelodeons dating back from 1905. The Mills 'Violano-Virtuoso' plays a violin with a piano accompaniment.

The music box collection consists of table-top and floor-model instruments. There are some music boxes in the museum that are able to play bells and drums and one that can play a reed organ.

In the organ exhibit, there is a self playing pipe organ, a monkey organ, a glass organ, a Hammond organ, Reed organ, and a 300-year-old hurdy-gurdy, as well as others, and visitors can see and hear some of the instruments play on iPads and monitors.

Many early amusement parks displayed a Laffing Sal, like the one on display in the amusement parks section. There is also a Wurlitzer Caliola band organ. When the Caliola played, it read music via punched-paper rolls or with a built-in keyboard to be played like a calliope. This exhibit also contains other amusement park attractions.

Musical toys, string instruments and a visual timeline of recorded music can also be found in the museum.

== See also ==
- Music of Virginia
- List of music museums
