= DeBence Antique Music World =

Music museum in Pennsylvania, USA

Coordinates: 41.39774°N 79.83040°W

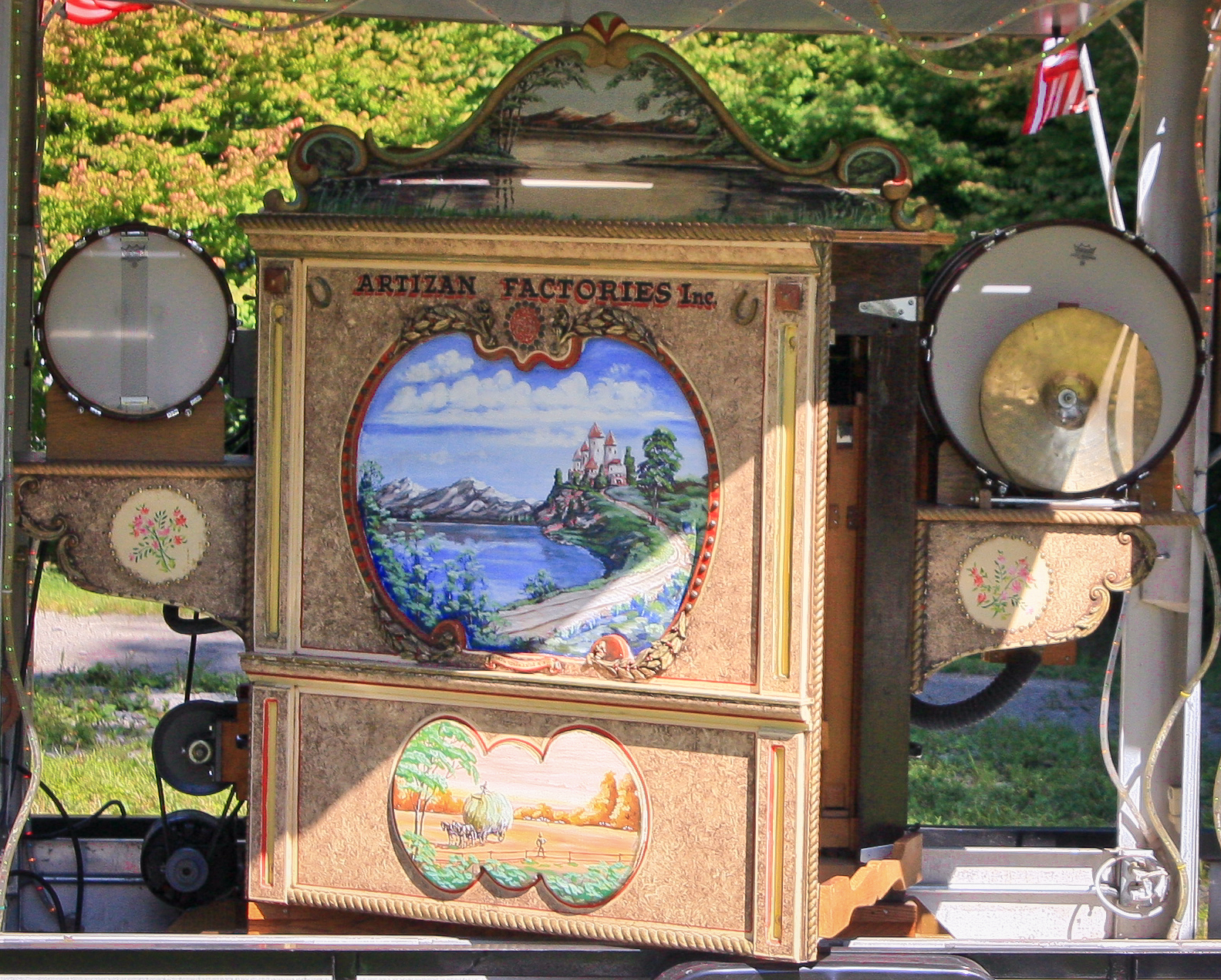
DeBence Antique Music World Band Organ by Artizan Factories Inc., at the Drake Day Circus at Drake Well Park, August 24, 2013

DeBence Antique Music World is a museum in Franklin, Pennsylvania whose collection contains more than 100 antique mechanical musical instruments, including music boxes, band organs, player pianos, a nickelodeon piano, as well as a number of other antiques. Many of the collection's mechanical instruments are rare; a number are among only a few manufactured, and a few are among the last in existence. Although the collection's value cannot be measured, an offer for a sum of multiple millions of dollars was once rejected.

== History ==
Dairy farmers Jake and Elizabeth DeBence began their collection in the 1940s in Grove City, Pennsylvania. The DeBences became avid auction attendees after purchasing two Tiffany style lamps for a low cost. The collection continued to grow and to this day donations are still accepted.

When the DeBences retired to Franklin, Pennsylvania in 1965, they housed the collection in their barn a few miles outside of town and opened it to public viewing as the DeBence Music Museum. After Jake's death in March 1992, Elizabeth put the collection up for sale, and a Japanese interest offered her $13 million. Feeling that her husband would have wanted the collection to remain intact and in the area, she turned them down.

She contacted the Chamber of Commerce and Local residents formed a non-profit organization (Oil Region Music Preservation Museum) that raised $1 million in a little more than seven months to buy the collection. The effort included selling wooden music notes for placement in storefronts and local yards as a show of support for keeping the collection in Franklin. The museum is housed in the location of the former G.C. Murphy five and dime store on Liberty Street. DeBence Antique Music World opened for tours in 1994. In addition to the musical instruments, the collection includes a large number of antiques the DeBences collected, and they are displayed along with other items that have musical or local significance. The DeBences' collection of more than 40 Tiffany-style hanging lamps provide the museum's lighting.

== Collection ==
- The Berry-Wood A.O.W. Orchestrion a nickelodeon that features 10 instruments played by a paper roll, is the last functioning one of its kind in existence. Built by the Berry-Wood piano company of Kansas, very few of this model were made. First introduced in 1912 the A.O.W. was the largest model made by Berry-Wood. Jake DeBence was once offered a large sum of money for it.
- The 1850 Mandoline Basse music box from Switzerland, the collection's oldest piece, has enameled metal bumble-bees that strike bells, accompanying the music of a spinning metal cylinder.
- The hand-wound 1901 Gem Organette, which cost $3.25 in the Sears catalog, was an inexpensive alternative to a music box and/or phonograph. The Gem Organette was one of the first music machines that was mass-produced. The music "cobs" cost 18 cents each, and the cobs and possibly a machine were available for free with the purchase of five pounds of flour.
- The Regina Grand music box plays a melody from over one hundred years ago. As the music is played by the huge 27" disc, the music is beautifully resonated by a solid mahogany case. It also features a coin slot and built in storage compartment.
- The Mills Novelty Company's Violano Virtuoso was so popular in 1911 that President of the United States William Howard Taft named it one of the eight greatest inventions of the decade. The machine features a violin played by rolls with piano accompaniment. The Machine is supposed to be held in tune by lead weights, but over time the weights have slipped.

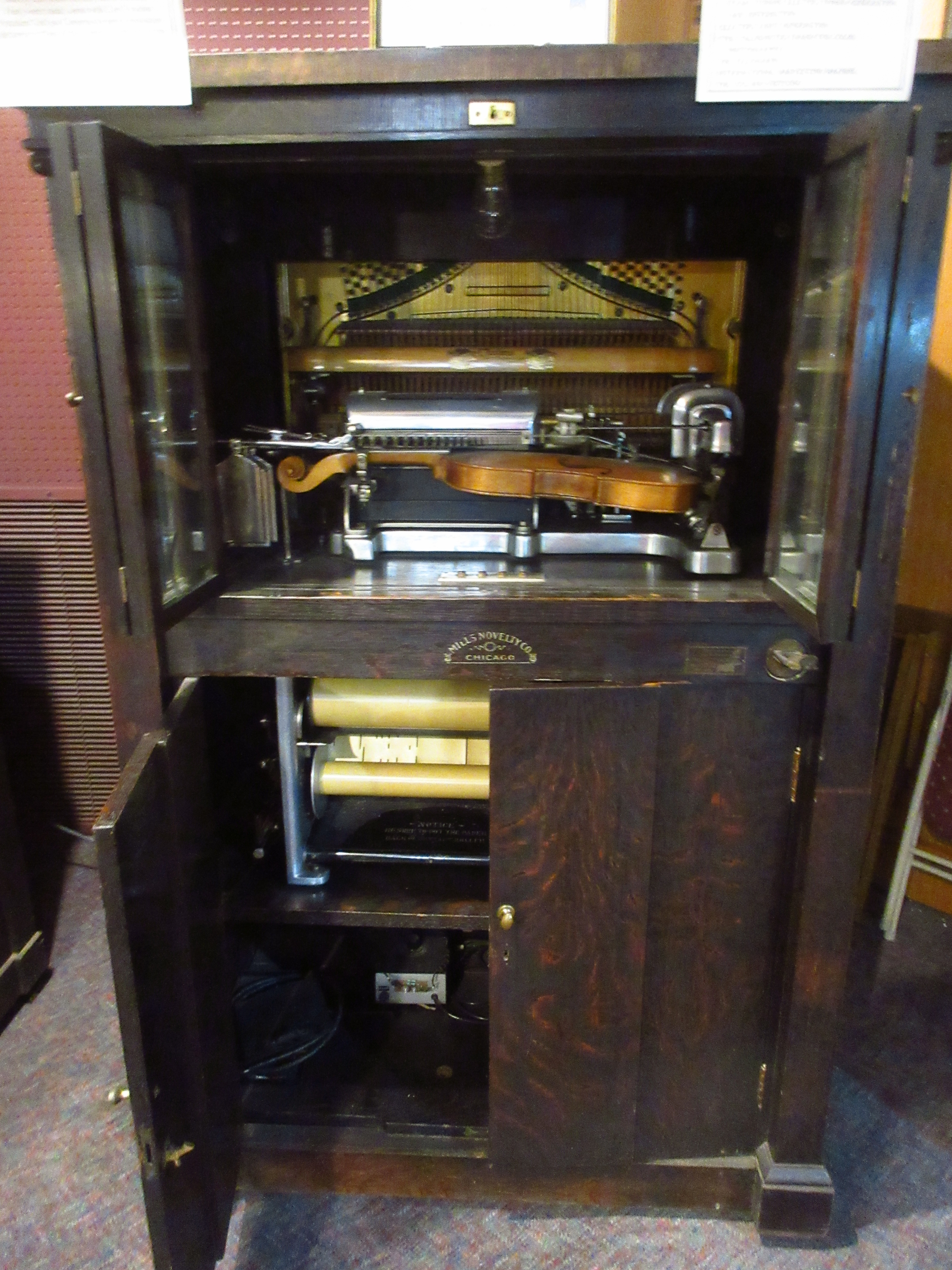
The Mills Virtuoso is one of a series of historic instruments that are played during the museum tour.

- Among the collection's Antique record Players, two models feature table top attachments that use power from the record to make dolls dance to the music. The figures are often worth more than the machines because they were considered toys and would often be destroyed.
- The Artizan Air-Calio Calliope from 1927 is one of only three such machines ever manufactured; although there is no record of a third machine even being made, there are 3 in existence. It operates from a special style roll or Wurlitzer APP Roll but only reversed.
- The Wurlitzer Style 65 Band Organ is a one of a kind model in which no other was known to be produced. It is fully chromatic which means that it can play in every key. The organ was last publicly used on the Carousel at Cabana Beach Park in Washington, Pennsylvania.
- The Wurlitzer 153 Band Organ was originally used on the Carousel at Idora Park, Youngstown in Ohio. The machine features metal bells on the front of the machine that accompany the music. This was one of the most popular models produced by the Wurlitzer company.
- The Wurlitzer Pianino is one of the fewer than two dozen that remain. It has flute and violin pipes that accompany to 44 note half piano. These were one of the Wurlitzer company's first experiments into mechanical pianos.
- The Cremona "J" Tall Case is one of only a few manufactured. The machine is one of many Cremona machines in the collection. It features many instruments and operates from a dime.

== See also ==
- List of music museums
