= Barrington Hills, Illinois =

- Village
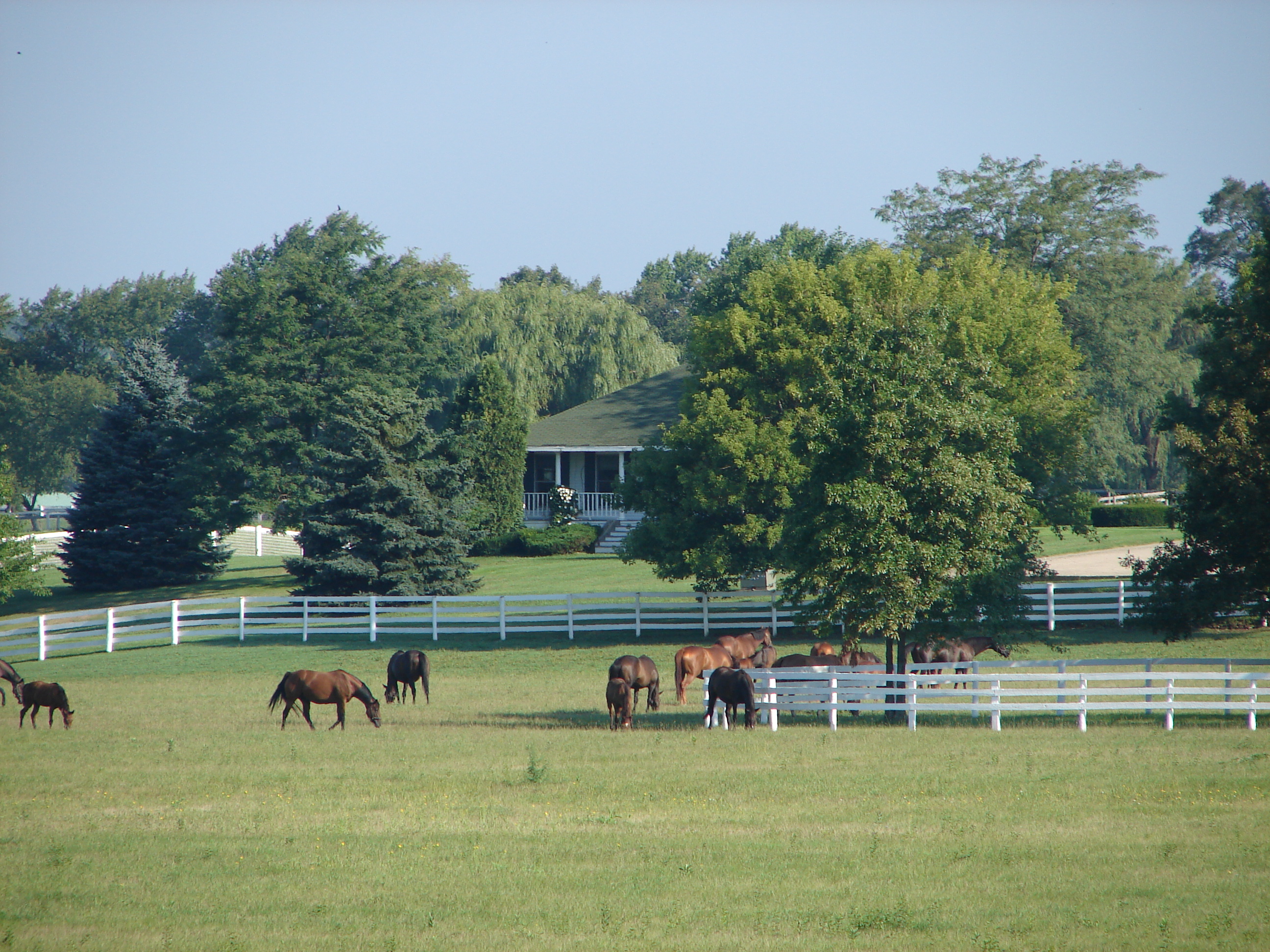
- Horse farm in Barrington Hills

- Flag Logo
- Interactive map of Barrington Hills, Illinois
- Location within Chicago metropolitan area Location within Illinois Location within the United States
- Coordinates: 42°08′24″N 88°12′12″W
- Country: United States
- State: Illinois
- Counties: Cook, Kane, McHenry
- Townships: Barrington, Dundee, Cuba, Algonquin
- Incorporated: July 5, 1957

Government
  - Type: Mayor–council

Area
  - Total: 27.62 sq mi (71.54 km^{2})
  - Land: 27.00 sq mi (69.94 km^{2})
  - Water: 0.62 sq mi (1.60 km^{2})
- Elevation: 774 ft (236 m)

Population (2020)
  - Total: 4,114
  - Density: 152.3/sq mi (58.82/km^{2})
- Time zone: UTC-6 (CST)
  - Summer (DST): UTC-5 (CDT)
- ZIP codes: 60010, 60021, 60102
- Area codes: 847, 224
- FIPS code: 17-03883
- GNIS feature ID: 2398038
- Website: barringtonhills-il.gov

Barrington Hills is a village located about 40 miles (64 km) northwest of Chicago in the U.S. state of Illinois. Per the 2020 census, the population was 4,114. It straddles approximately 29 square miles (75 km^{2}) over four counties, Cook, Kane, McHenry, and Lake. The Village of Barrington Hills was incorporated in 1957.

The suburban village is included in the greater Barrington area. Many very affluent residents live on large estates and commute to downtown Chicago. A minimum 5-acre (2.0 ha) zoning restriction has been in effect on new construction since 1963, but the existence of equestrian farms antedates the village by decades. Farming and horse raising are allowed. Barrington Hills includes farms and estates such as Hill 'N Dale Farms, which was owned by Richard L. Duchossois, former owner of the Arlington Park racetrack. It was acquired by Citizens for Conservation in 2022 CFC plans to restore the original countours of Spring Creek as well as wetlands and prairies. Another example of an estate is Bank Note Farm. The identification of the area with horses carries over to the names Broncos and Colts for school teams.

== History ==
=== Barrington Center Church ===
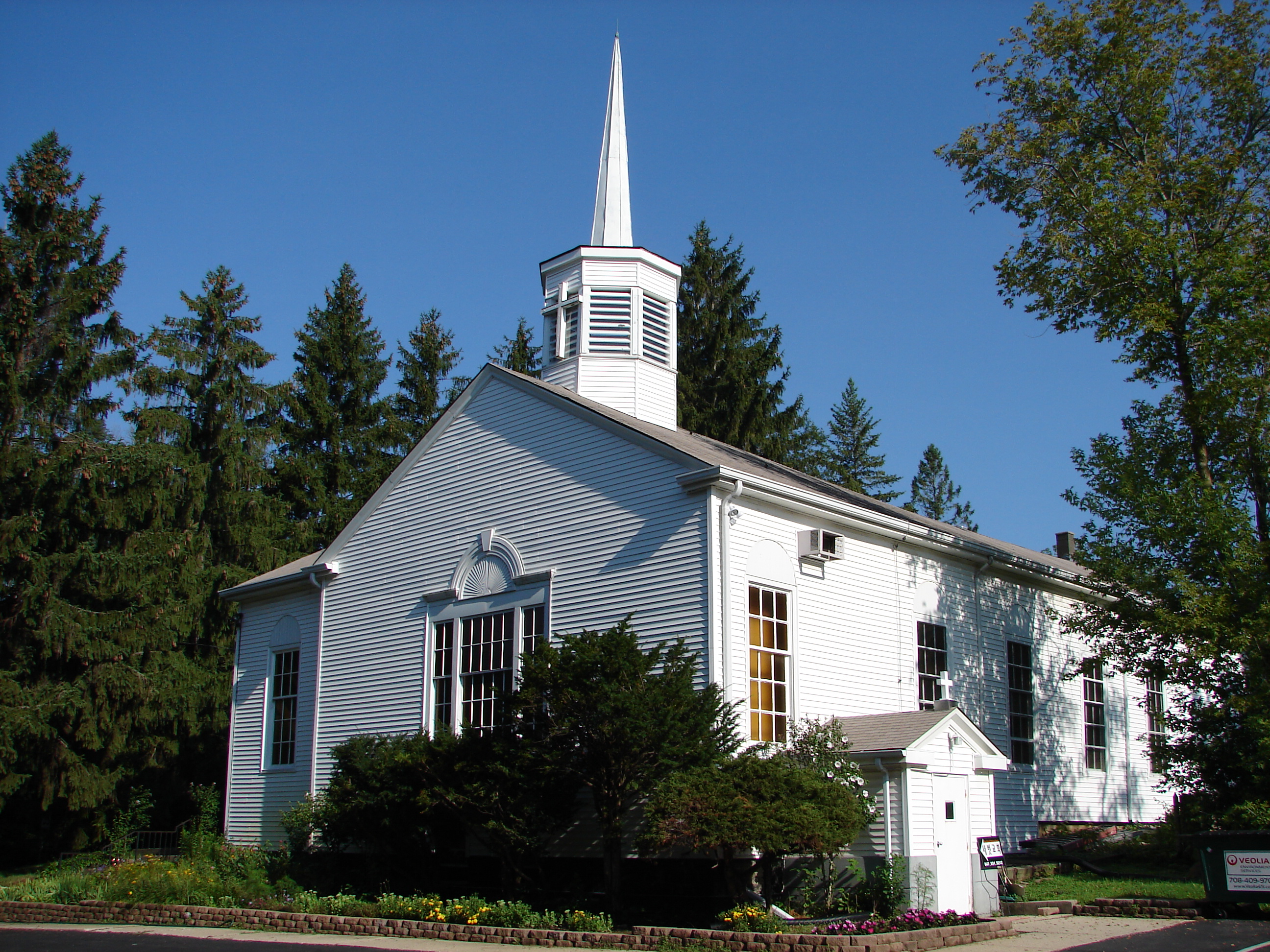
Barrington Center Church

Barrington Center Church was built in 1853 by the Barrington Methodist Episcopal Society. A memorial plaque outside the church lists 91 area residents - one woman and 90 men - who served in the Civil War. Since the 1980s, the church building has been used by a Korean-American congregation, the New Friends Wesleyan Church.

In 1860, about 18 immigrant families of Czech ancestry settled along the east side of the Fox River, near the future site of Fox River Grove. In 1867, land was purchased at the southwest corner of Church and River - Algonquin roads, and construction was started on St. John Nepomucene Chapel, named after the patron saint of Bohemia. Completed in 1873, the chapel was never served by its own priest, and currently services are scheduled only once a year. The chapel and its cemetery are owned by the St. John Nepomucene Catholic Cemetery Association, making it the only privately owned Catholic chapel and cemetery in the Rockford Diocese.

=== Railroad and gentleman farms ===
Starting about 1900, business executives from Chicago, many of whom were tied to the railroad industry, purchased the rolling farms and subdivided them into large summer estates. One such individual was Spencer C. Otis Sr., who by 1910 is credited with purchasing 1,000 acres (405 ha) of farmland along what was then Goose Lake Road but is now known as Otis Road and creating Hawthorne Farm. Otis was a "gentleman farmer" of the era. He worked in Chicago commerce, but his hobby was dairy farming on his large country estate which was led by his son Spencer Otis Jr. who attended agricultural school at the University of Illinois in Urbana. At this time the university was experimenting building round barns, of which became an Otis signature, as there were three built on the Hawthorne Farm. Several of Otis Senior's business associates, including George E. Van Hagen, also built large estates in the area and ran their summer homes as year-round dairy farms.

=== Barrington Hills Country Club ===
In 1921, the Barrington Hills Country Club, with its eighteen-hole golf course, was established on 200 acres (81 ha) of unfarmable land between County Line Road, Oak Knoll Road, and Northwest Highway. The land was donated by three of the club's early founders: H. Stillson Hart, who owned the farmstead known as Hart Hills just to the east of the club; George E. Van Hagen of Wakefield Farm, who owned the land just to the west of the club; and J.R. Cardwell, whose Oak Knoll Farm swelled along the winding Oak Knoll Road on the club's northern end. Van Hagen became the club's first president. Noted Chicago architect Robert Work, who was associated with David Adler, designed the first clubhouse, which was opened in 1926 and burned to the ground in 1930. Work designed the second clubhouse as well, which opened in 1931 and still stands.

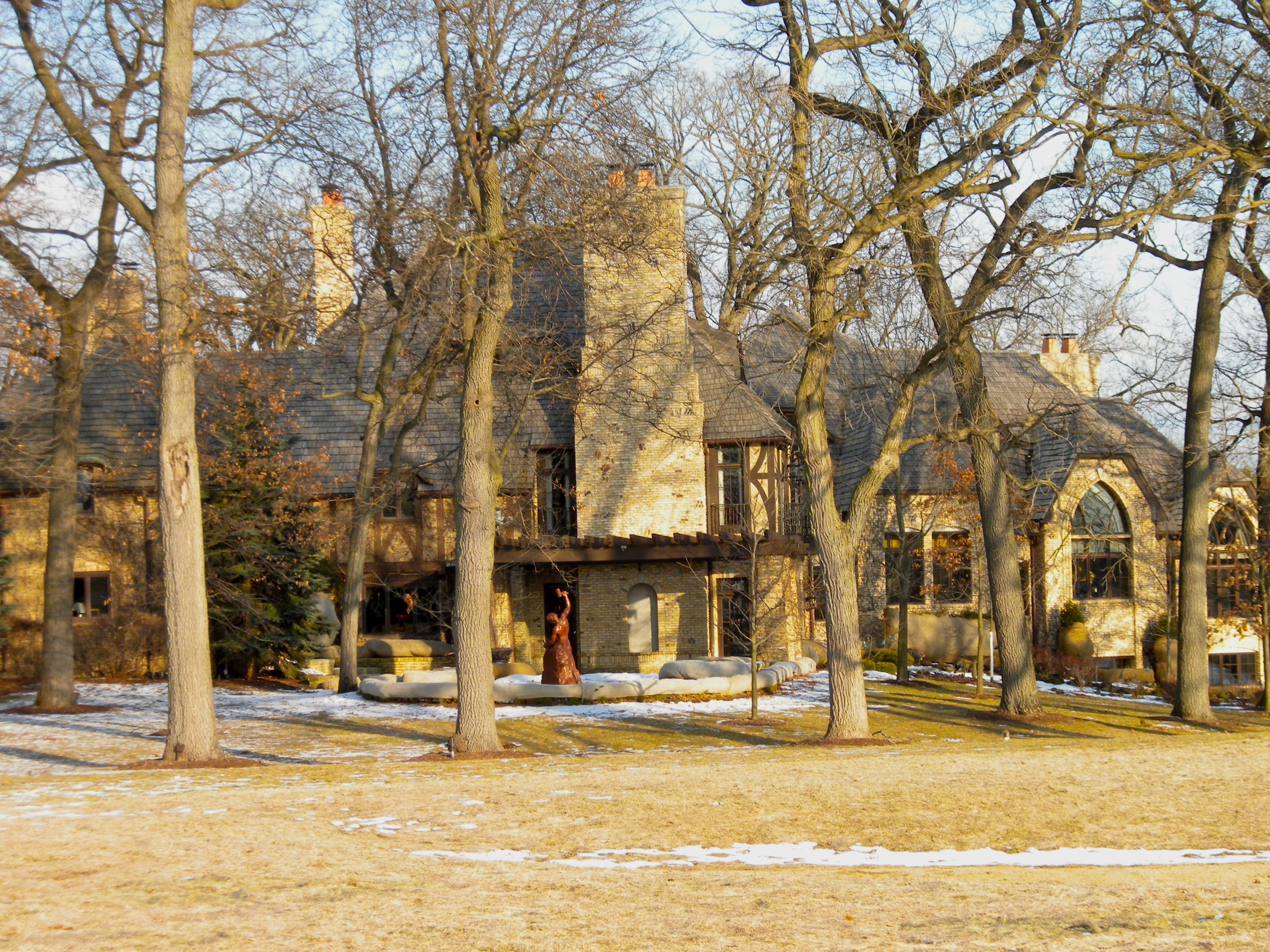
The Grigsby Estate is on the National Register of Historic Places in Lake County.

== Geography ==
According to the 2021 census gazetteer files, Barrington Hills has a total area of 27.62 square miles (71.54 km^{2}), of which 27.01 square miles (69.96 km^{2}) (or 97.77%) is land and 0.62 square miles (1.61 km^{2}) (or 2.23%) is water. The village is located within the Fox River watershed of the greater Illinois River waterway. There is about 1,700 feet (520 m) of shoreline along the east bank of the Fox River. Locally there are two perennial stream courses known to the west as Spring Creek and to the east as Flint Creek. Over the years, Flint Creek has been impounded such that along its course in the Cook County portion of the village are substantial lakes with such names as Hawley, Hawthorne, and Keene.

Into the 1990s, farmers still worked about 3,000 acres (1,200 ha) of land. Residential properties of over 1-acre (0.40 ha) covered 30 percent. There is no downtown center, but the village has a small shopping strip along Route 14. With a population of 4,209 in 2010, Barrington Hills has kept its rural flavor as industrial and commercial development has sprung up around its borders.

The village is bordered on the west by East Dundee, Carpentersville, and Algonquin; on the north by Fox River Grove, and Lake Barrington; on the east by Barrington and Inverness; and to the south and southeast by South Barrington, and Hoffman Estates. Barrington Hills is one of only three municipalities in Illinois (along with Aurora and Centralia) with land located among four counties.

=== Surrounding areas ===
Lake Barrington
Trout Valley / Cary North Barrington
Algonquin Barrington
East Dundee Inverness
Hoffman Estates / South Barrington

== Demographics ==
Historical population
Census	Pop.	Note	%±
1960	1,726		—
1970	2,805		62.5%
1980	3,631		29.4%
1990	4,202		15.7%
2000	3,915		−6.8%
2010	4,209		7.5%
2020	4,114		−2.3%
U.S. Decennial Census; 2010 2020

=== Racial and ethnic composition ===
St. John Nepomucene Chapel (before 1915)

Barrington Hills village, Illinois – Racial and ethnic composition Note: the US Census treats Hispanic/Latino as an ethnic category. This table excludes Latinos from the racial categories and assigns them to a separate category. Hispanics/Latinos may be of any race.
Race / Ethnicity (NH = Non-Hispanic)	Pop 2000	Pop 2010	Pop 2020	% 2000	% 2010	% 2020
White alone (NH)	3,647	3,752	3,369	93.15%	89.14%	81.89%
Black or African American alone (NH)	18	32	39	0.46%	0.76%	0.95%
Native American or Alaska Native alone (NH)	0	1	4	0.00%	0.02%	0.10%
Asian alone (NH)	153	272	348	3.91%	6.46%	8.46%
Native Hawaiian or Pacific Islander alone (NH)	0	0	0	0.00%	0.00%	0.00%
Other race alone (NH)	0	0	18	0.00%	0.00%	0.44%
Mixed race or Multiracial (NH)	22	38	124	0.56%	0.90%	3.01%
Hispanic or Latino (any race)	75	114	212	1.92%	2.71%	5.15%
Total	3,915	4,209	4,114	100.00%	100.00%	100.00%

=== 2020 census ===
As of the 2020 census, there were 4,114 people in Barrington Hills. The population density was 148.94 inhabitants per square mile (57.51/km^{2}), and there were 1,651 housing units at an average density of 59.77 per square mile (23.08/km^{2}).

The median age was 50.1 years. 21.9% of residents were under the age of 18 and 22.9% were 65 years of age or older. For every 100 females, there were 97.9 males, and for every 100 females age 18 and over, there were 96.5 males age 18 and over. 11.1% of residents lived in urban areas, while 88.9% lived in rural areas.

There were 1,466 households, of which 32.3% had children under the age of 18 living in them. Of all households, 73.5% were married-couple households, 10.0% were households with a male householder and no spouse or partner present, and 12.6% were households with a female householder and no spouse or partner present. About 14.4% of all households were made up of individuals, and 8.4% had someone living alone who was 65 years of age or older.

There were 1,651 housing units, of which 11.2% were vacant. The homeowner vacancy rate was 2.4% and the rental vacancy rate was 5.3%.

=== Demographic estimates ===
In 2016-2020 American Community Survey 5-year estimates, there were 1,277 families in the village, with an average household size of 3.08 and an average family size of 2.88.

=== Income and poverty ===
The median income for a household in the village was $157,414, and the median income for a family was $181,181. Males had a median income of $118,716 versus $40,148 for females. The per capita income for the village was $88,747. About 5.5% of families and 8.3% of the population were below the poverty line, including 12.5% of those under age 18 and 1.4% of those age 65 or over.

=== 2000 census ===
As of the census of 2000, there were 3,915 people, 1,381 households, and 1,168 families residing in the village. The population density was 140.4 people per square mile (54.2 people/km^{2}). There were 1,456 housing units at an average density of 52.2 per square mile (20.2/km^{2}). The racial makeup of the village was 94.30% White, 0.46% African American, 3.91% Asian, 0.74% from other races, and 0.59% from two or more races. Hispanic or Latino of any race were 1.92% of the population.

There were 1,381 households, out of which 33.6% had children under the age of 18 living with them, 78.9% were married couples living together, 3.5% had a female householder with no husband present, and 15.4% were non-families. 12.5% of all households were made up of individuals, and 5.3% had someone living alone who was 65 years of age or older. The average household size was 2.83 and the average family size was 3.10.

In the village, the population was spread out, with 25.3% under the age of 18, 4.6% from 18 to 24, 20.0% from 25 to 44, 37.7% from 45 to 64, and 12.4% who were 65 years of age or older. The median age was 45 years. For every 100 females, there were 98.1 males. For every 100 females age 18 and over, there were 98.6 males.

The median income for a household in the village was $145,330, and the median income for a family was $156,002. Males had a median income of over $100,000 versus $56,167 for females. The per capita income for the village was $73,629. About 0.9% of families and 3.1% of the population were below the poverty line, including 3.9% of those under age 18 and none of those age 65 or over.

The village ranks 87th on the list of highest-income places in the United States with a population over 1,000, with nearby North Barrington, South Barrington, and Inverness also making the list.

== Government ==
Barrington Hills was incorporated in 1957. It was then composed of land only in the northwest corner of Cook County, and expanded over the next five years to its approximate configuration of today. In 1959, areas in McHenry and Lake counties joined the village, and in 1962 the village of Middlebury in Kane County was annexed. With the incorporation of Middlebury, the village government acquired its first building, a single-room school house converted into a police station.

The current Village Hall was constructed in 1974 with a substantial addition in 1993. The building hosts the Barrington Hills Police station, administrative offices and public meeting rooms. Barrington Area Council of Governments BACOG offices are also located on this site. A fire station was constructed in 1994 on the grounds.

The Village of Barrington Hills is a home rule municipality which functions under the council-manager form of government with a Village President and a six-member board of trustees, all of whom are elected at large to staggered four-year terms. Officers of the village include a village treasurer, a village clerk, a building code enforcement officer and a village manager.

The current village President is Brian D Cecola and current members of the Board of Trustees are Colleen Konicek Hannigan, Bryan Croll, Brian D. Cecola, Robert Zuback and Paula Jacobsen. The village manager is Anna Paul.

== Education ==
The only public school located in the village is Countryside Elementary School, with about 500 students, in grades K-5, in the Barrington Community Unit School District 220. Countryside Elementary School draws students from both Barrington Hills and the eastern half of Fox River Grove which falls into District 220 also. Students from Countryside either attend Barrington Prairie Middle School or Barrington Station Middle School Station. Older students attend the nearby Barrington High School. Portions of the village are also within CUSD 300 of Dundee-Crown High School and of the Cary-Grove High School district.

== Notable people ==
- Tony Accardo (1906–1992), organized crime figure
- Greg Brown, CEO of Motorola
- Bill Moseley (born 1951), film actor and musician
- Terry Moran (born 1959), ABC News Senior National Correspondent (grew up in Barrington Hills)
- Henry Paulson (born 1946), Goldman Sachs CEO (1998–2006), U.S. Treasury Secretary (2006–2009)
- Jasper Sanfilippo (1931–2020), President and CEO of John B. Sanfilippo & Son, Inc.
- Richard J. Stephenson, Chairman of Cancer Treatment Centers of America
- Harry Mohr Weese (1915–1998), architect and planner
