= Northern Illinois Conference (United Methodist) =

The Northern Illinois Conference is an Annual Conference (regional episcopal area, similar to a diocese) of the United Methodist Church. This conference serves the northern portion of the state of Illinois, with its administrative offices at 303 E. Wacker Dr. in Chicago and the office of the bishop being in the Chicago Temple Building in Chicago, Illinois. It is part of the North Central Jurisdictional Conference. The current bishop is Dan Schwerin.

== Mission ==
The purpose of the annual conference is to make disciples of Jesus Christ for the transformation of the world by equipping its local churches for ministry and by providing a connection for ministry beyond the local church; all to the glory of God.

== Districts ==
The Northern Illinois Annual Conference is further subdivided into 5 smaller regions, called "districts", which provide further administrative functions for the operation of local churches in cooperation with each other. This structure is vital to Methodism, and is referred to as connectionalism. The Districts that comprise the Northern Illinois Conference are:

- Prairie North
- Prairie Central
- Prairie South
- Lake North
- Lake South

== Conference Boundaries ==
A map can be viewed here.

== Institutions of Higher Learning ==
The Northern Illinois Conference supports and is host to three institutions of higher learning:

- Kendall College, Evanston, Illinois
- Garrett-Evangelical Theological Seminary, Evanston, Illinois
- North Central College, Naperville, Illinois.

== See also ==
- Annual Conferences of the United Methodist Church
